= Marpe (Salwey) =

River in Germany

Location
- Country: Germany
- State: North Rhine-Westphalia

Physical characteristics
- Mouth
  - location: Salwey
  - coordinates: 51.2583°N 8.1489°E
- Length: 9.1 km (5.7 mi)

Basin features
- Progression: Salwey→ Wenne→ Ruhr→ Rhine→ North Sea

Marpe is a river of North Rhine-Westphalia, Germany. It flows into the Salwey near Eslohe.

== See also ==
- List of rivers of North Rhine-Westphalia
