= Esselbach (Salwey) =

River in Germany

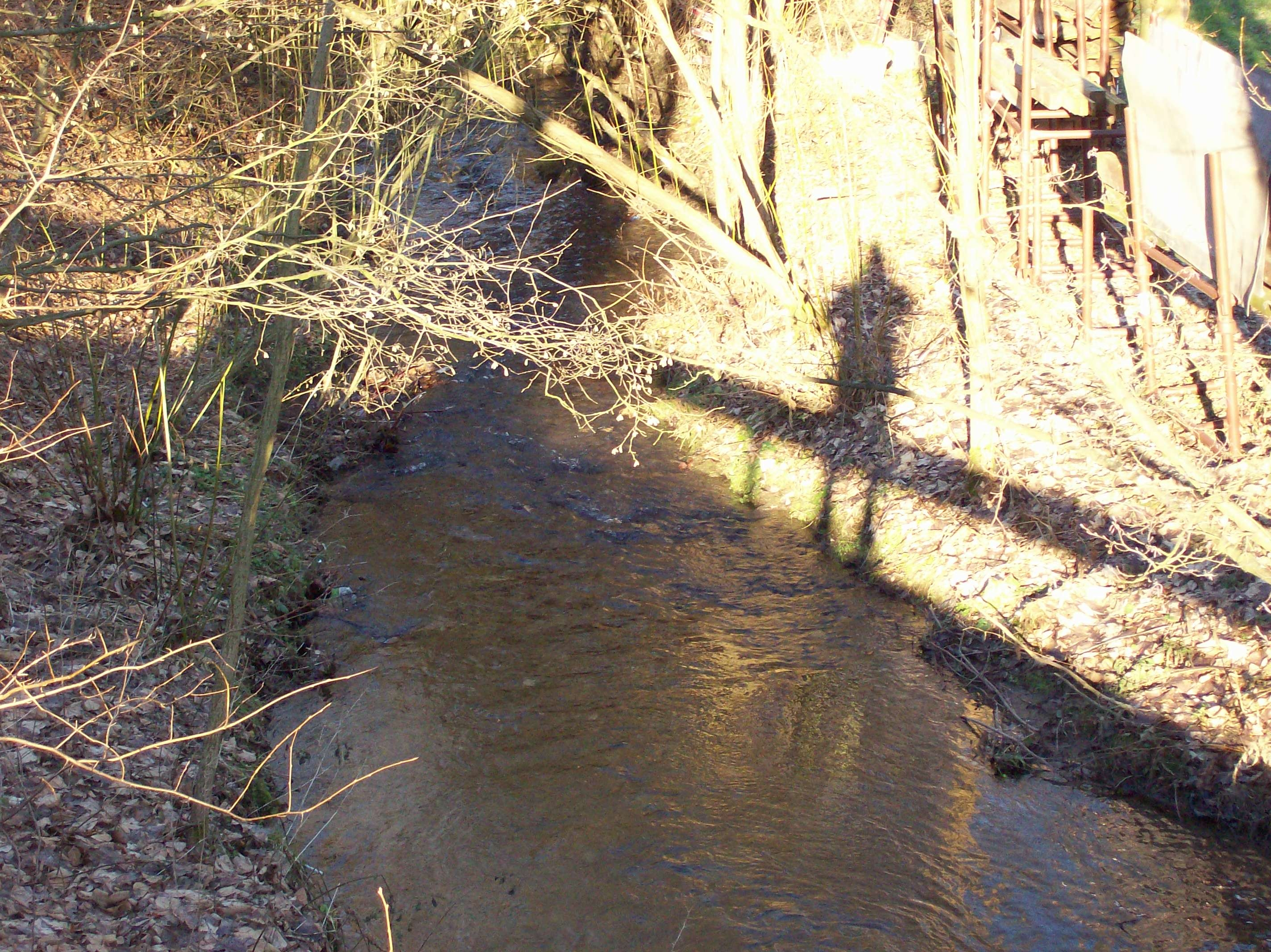

Location
- Country: Germany
- State: North Rhine-Westphalia

Physical characteristics
- Mouth
  - location: Salwey
  - coordinates: 51.2597°N 8.1747°E
- Length: 10.4 km (6.5 mi)

Basin features
- Progression: Salwey→ Wenne→ Ruhr→ Rhine→ North Sea

Esselbach is a river of North Rhine-Westphalia, Germany. It is a right tributary of the Salwey.

== See also ==
- List of rivers of North Rhine-Westphalia
