= Arpe =

Arpe may refer to:

== Places ==
- Arpe (Wenne, Berge), a river of North Rhine-Westphalia, Germany, left tributary of the Wenne joining it at Berge (a district of Meschede)
- Arpe (Wenne, Niederberndorf), a river of North Rhine-Westphalia, Germany, left tributary of the Wenne joining it at Niederberndorf (a district of Schmallenberg)
- Arpe (Schmallenberg), locality in the municipality Schmallenberg in North Rhine-Westphalia, Germany

== People ==
- Johannes Arpe (1897–1962), German actor
- Oreste Arpè (1889–1977), Italian sport wrestler
- Peter Friedrich Arpe (Petrus Fridericus Arpius, 1682–1740), German lawyer, historian and legal writer

== See also ==
- Arpitania
- Harper (disambiguation)
