= Mailar =

- Stadtteil of Schmallenberg
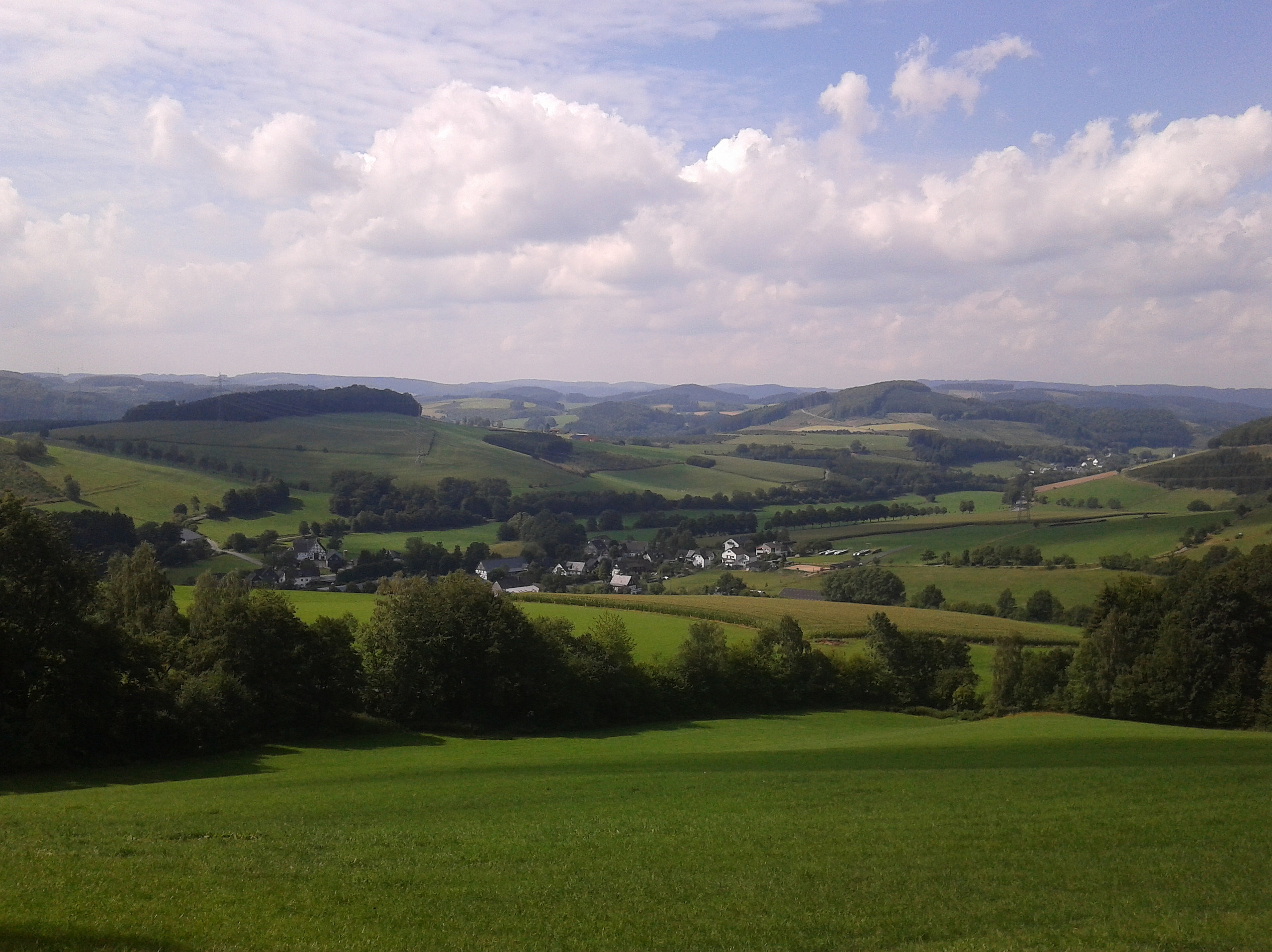
- Interactive map of Mailar
- Location within Germany Location within North Rhine-Westphalia
- Coordinates: 51°12′30″N 8°14′57″E
- Country: Germany
- State: North Rhine-Westphalia
- Admin. region: Arnsberg
- District: Hochsauerlandkreis
- Town: Schmallenberg

Population (2021-12-31)
  - Total: 111
- Time zone: UTC+01:00 (CET)
  - Summer (DST): UTC+02:00 (CEST)

Mailar is a locality in the municipality Schmallenberg in the district Hochsauerlandkreis in North Rhine-Westphalia, Germany.

The village has 111 inhabitants and lies in the north of the municipality of Schmallenberg at a height of around 360 m on the Bundesstraße 511. The river Leiße flows through the village. Mailar borders on the villages of Dorlar, Sellinghausen, Heiminghausen, Menkhausen and Niederberndorf.

The first written document mentioning "Megghelerdates" dates from 1365. The village used to belong to the municipality of Berghausen in Amt Schmallenberg until the end of 1974.

== Gallery ==
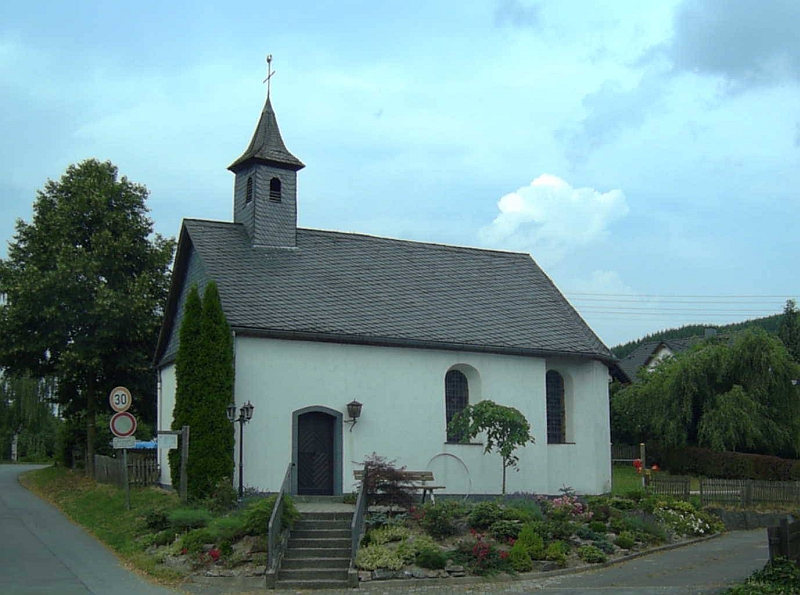
Chappel St. Nikolaus

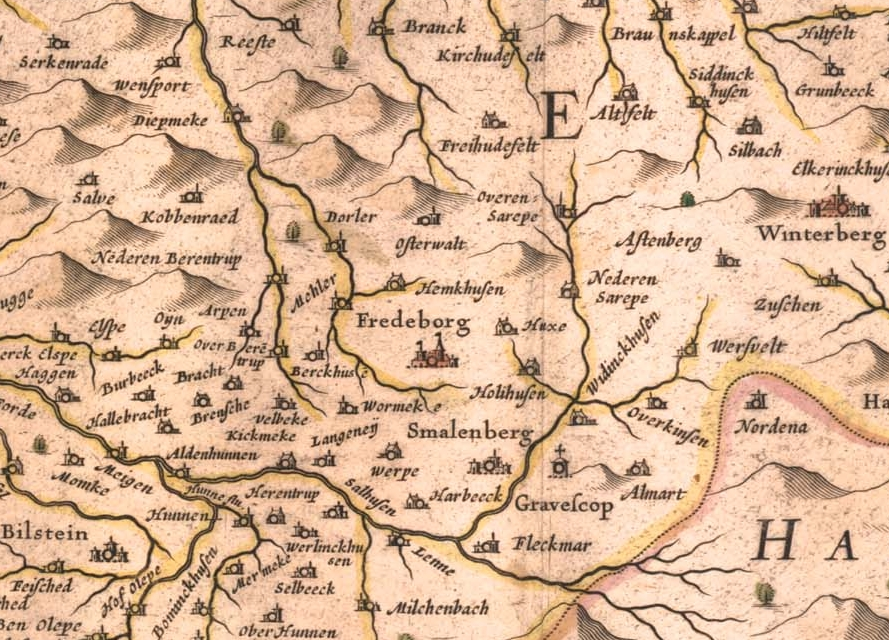
„Mehler“ 1645 - Westphalia Ducatus (Duchy of Westphalia)
