= Altenilpe =

- Stadtteil of Schmallenberg
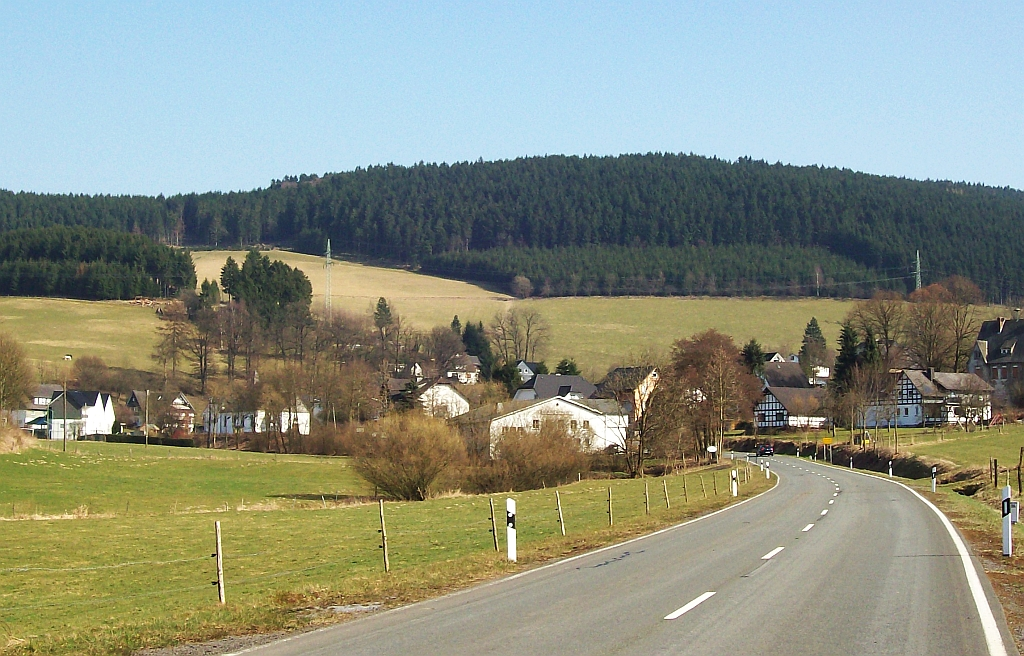
- Interactive map of Altenilpe
- Location within Germany Location within North Rhine-Westphalia
- Coordinates: 51°12′58″N 8°16′32″E
- Country: Germany
- State: North Rhine-Westphalia
- Admin. region: Arnsberg
- District: Hochsauerlandkreis
- Town: Schmallenberg

Population (2021-12-31)
  - Total: 154
- Time zone: UTC+01:00 (CET)
  - Summer (DST): UTC+02:00 (CEST)

Altenilpe is a locality in the municipality Schmallenberg in the district Hochsauerlandkreis in North Rhine-Westphalia, Germany.

The village has 154 inhabitants and lies in the north of the municipality of Schmallenberg at a height of around 438 m on Kreisstraße 20. The river Ilpe flows through the village. Altenilpe borders on the villages of Bad Fredeburg, Hengsiepen, Nierentrop, Oberhenneborn, and Sellinghausen.

The first written document mentioning Ahlenifelpe and Yfflepe dates from 1313. The village used to belong to the municipality of Dorlar in Amt Schmallenberg until the end of 1974.

== Gallery ==
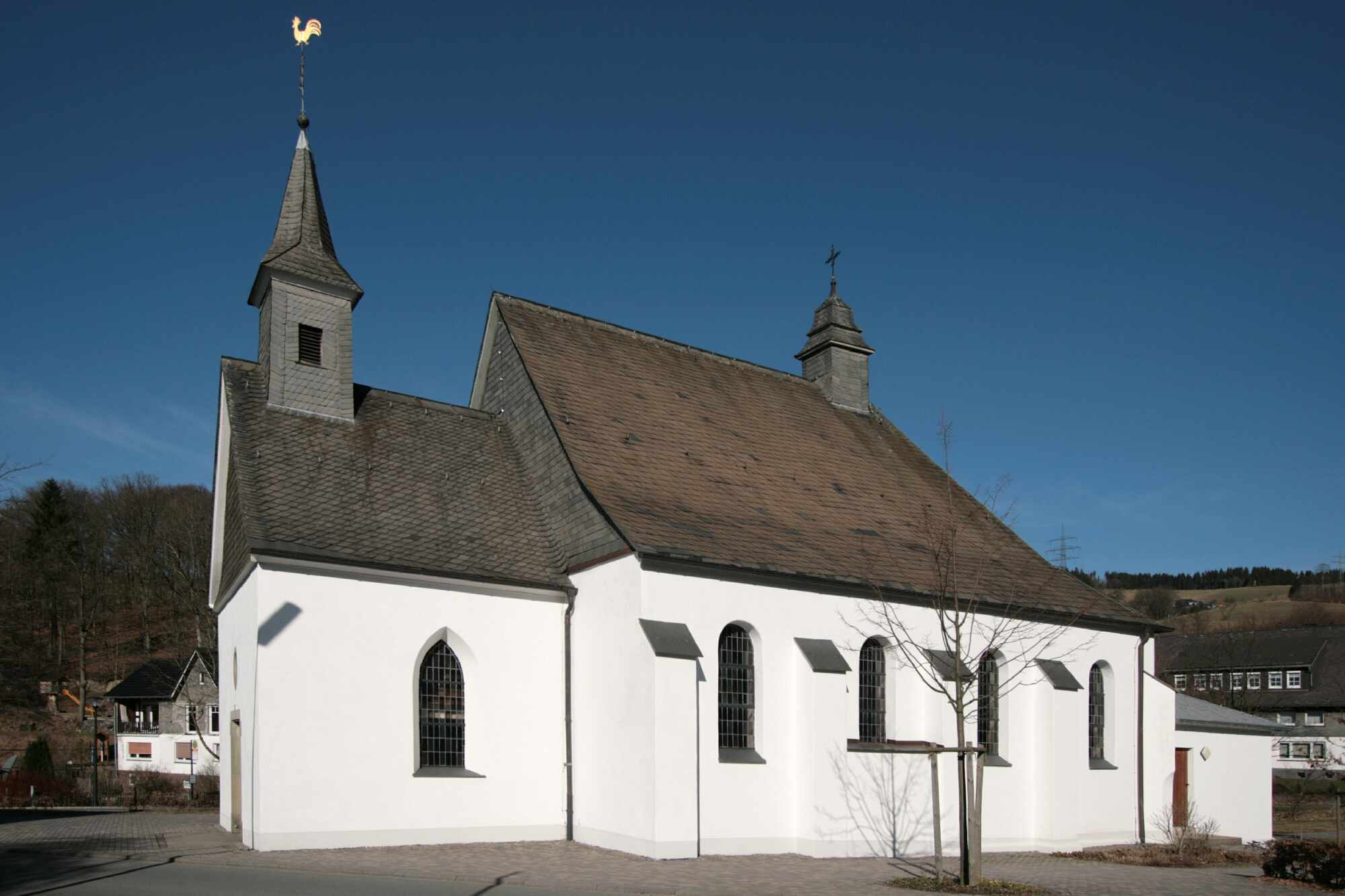
Church Altenilpe St. Lucia

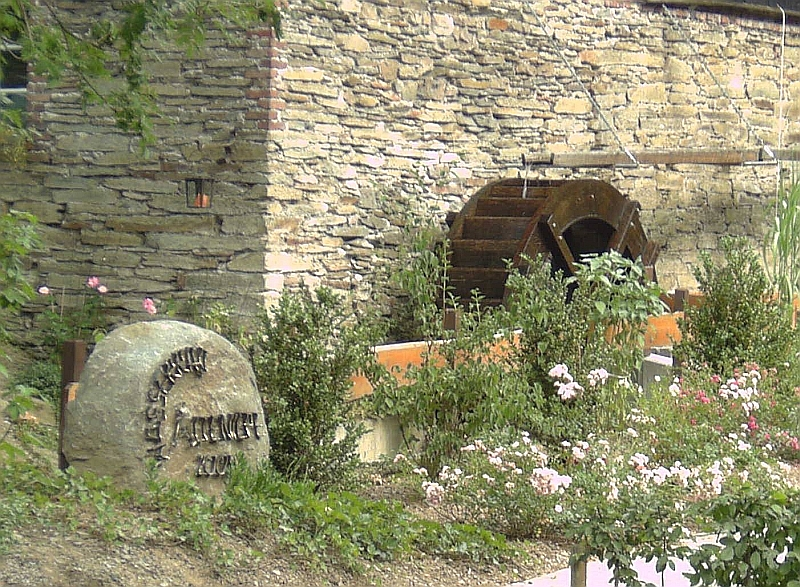
Water wheel in Altenilpe
