= Leiße =

River in Germany

Location
- Country: Germany
- State: North Rhine-Westphalia

Physical characteristics
- Mouth
  - location: Wenne
  - coordinates: 51.2382°N 8.2068°E
- Length: 13.9 km (8.6 mi)

Basin features
- Progression: Wenne→ Ruhr→ Rhine→ North Sea

The Leiße is a river of North Rhine-Westphalia, Germany. It flows into the Wenne in Frielinghausen.

== See also ==
- List of rivers of North Rhine-Westphalia
