= Sellinghausen =

- Stadtteil of Schmallenberg
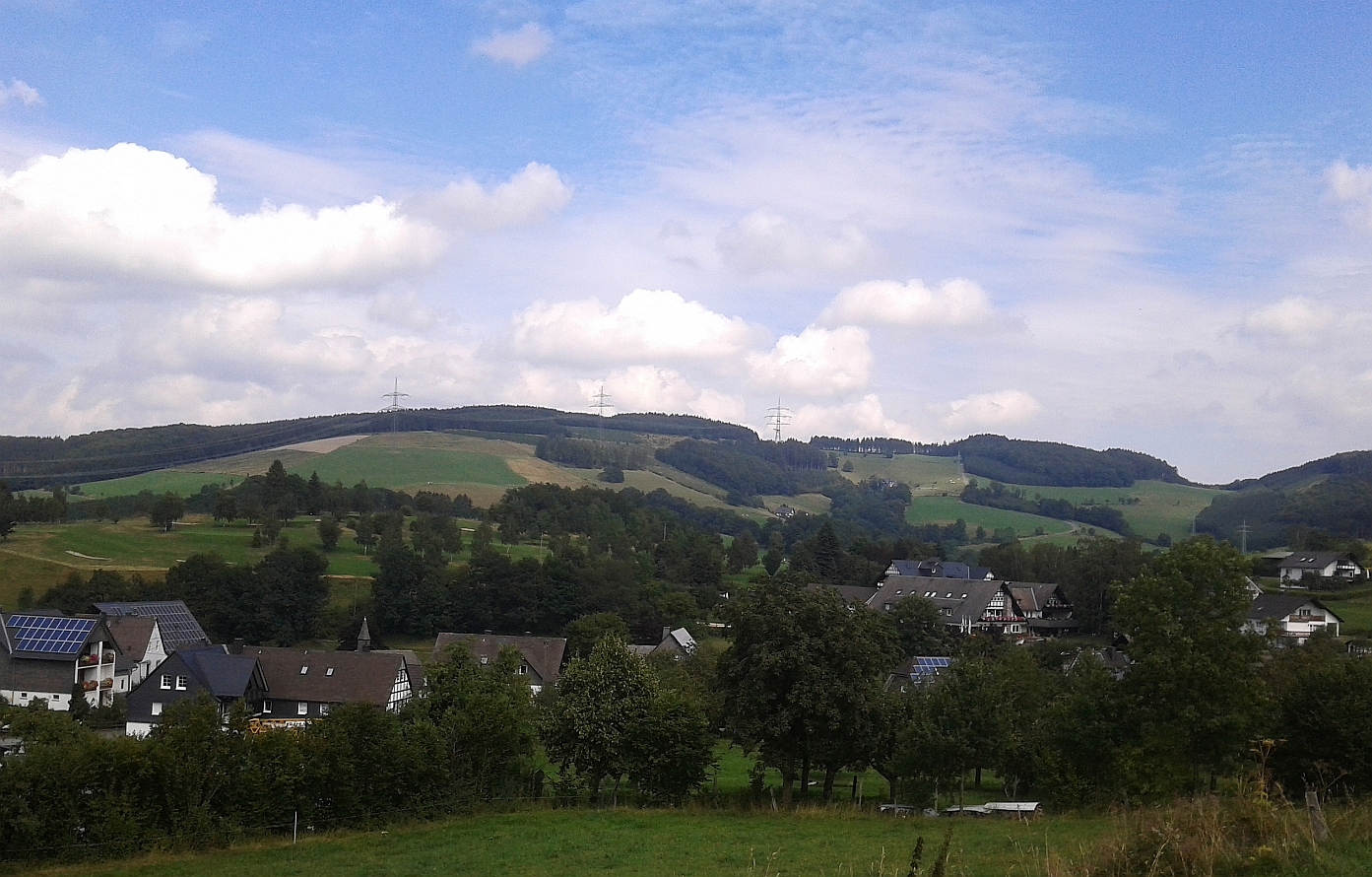
- Interactive map of Sellinghausen
- Location within Germany Location within North Rhine-Westphalia
- Coordinates: 51°12′48″N 8°15′53″E
- Country: Germany
- State: North Rhine-Westphalia
- Admin. region: Arnsberg
- District: Hochsauerlandkreis
- Town: Schmallenberg

Population (2021-12-31)
  - Total: 186
- Time zone: UTC+01:00 (CET)
  - Summer (DST): UTC+02:00 (CEST)

Sellinghausen is a locality in the municipality Schmallenberg in the district Hochsauerlandkreis in North Rhine-Westphalia, Germany.

The village has 186 inhabitants and lies in the north of the municipality of Schmallenberg at a height of around 432 m on the Kreisstraße 20. In the village flows the stream Hallebach in the river Ilpe. Sellinghausen borders on the villages of Altenilpe, Mailar and Dorlar.

"Selinchusen" was first mentioned in documents around 1300. The village used to belong to the municipality of Dorlar in Amt Schmallenberg until the end of 1974.

== Gallery ==
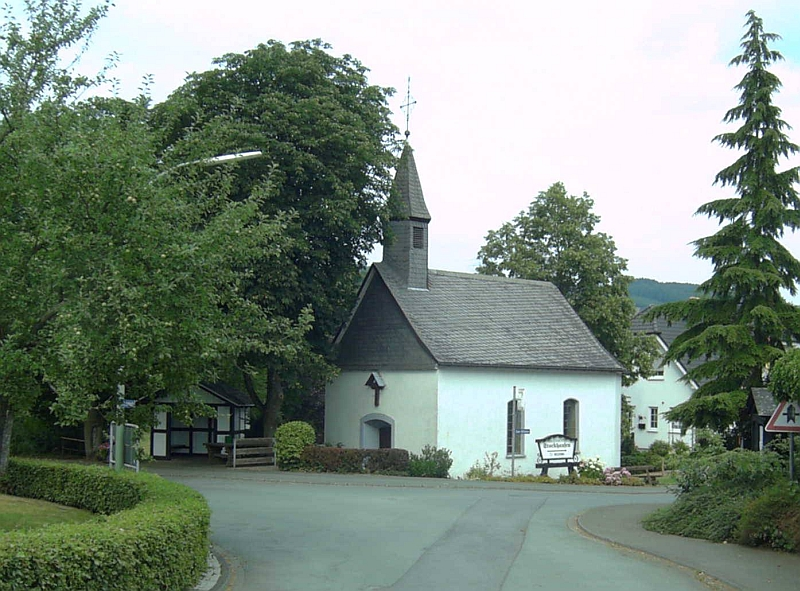
Chappel St. Blasius
