= Ilpe =

River in Germany

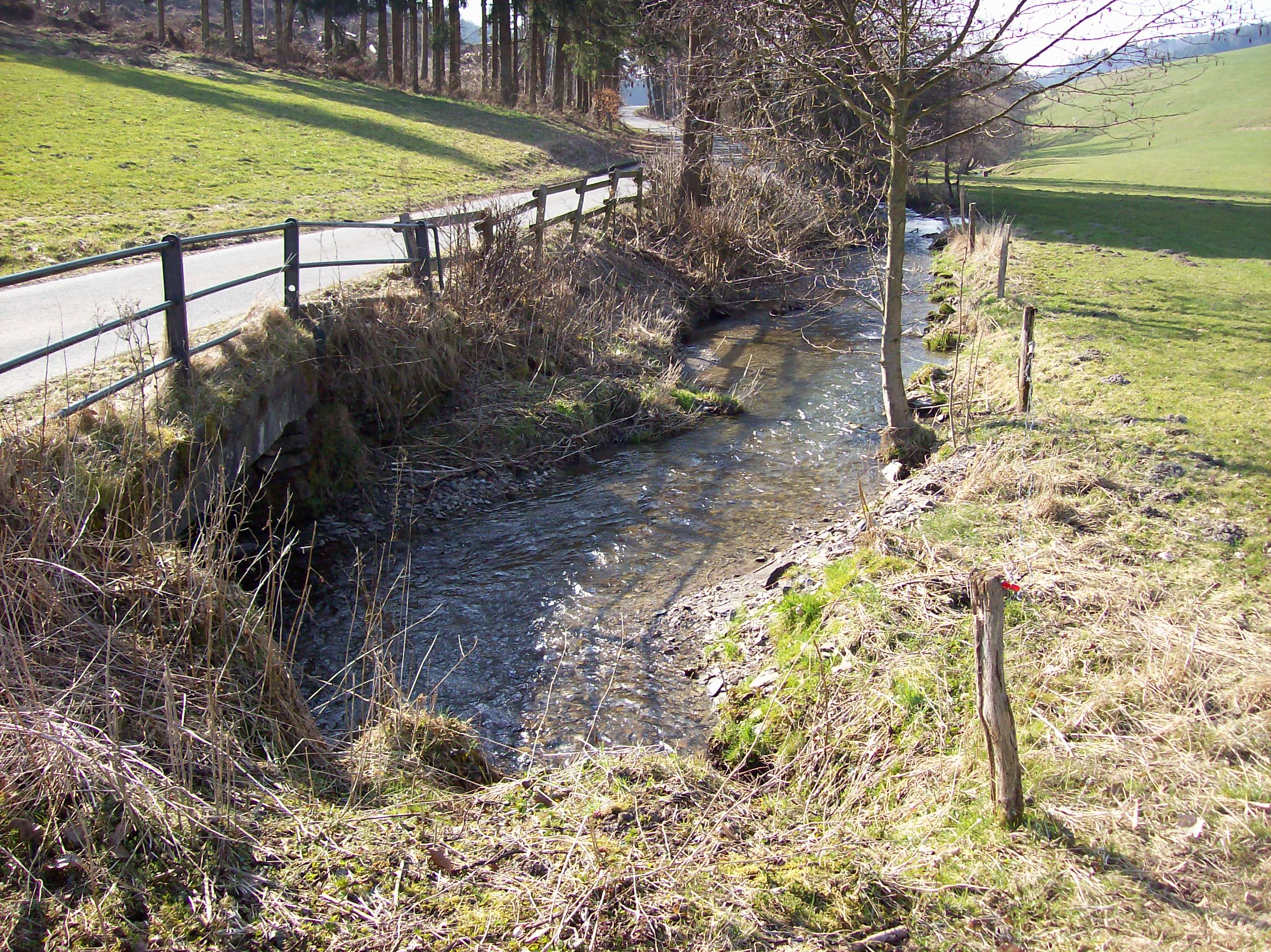

Location
- Country: Germany
- States: North Rhine-Westphalia

Physical characteristics
- Mouth
  - location: Wenne
  - coordinates: 51.2447°N 8.2097°E

Basin features
- Progression: Wenne→ Ruhr→ Rhine→ North Sea

Ilpe is a river of North Rhine-Westphalia, Germany. The source of the Ilpe is near the town of Altenilpe in the mountainous Sauerland region, at an elevation of approximately 511 m. The river flows primarily in a northwestern direction on its 8.3 km course into the Wenne in Bremke.

== See also ==
- List of rivers of North Rhine-Westphalia
