= Menkhausen =

- Stadtteil of Schmallenberg
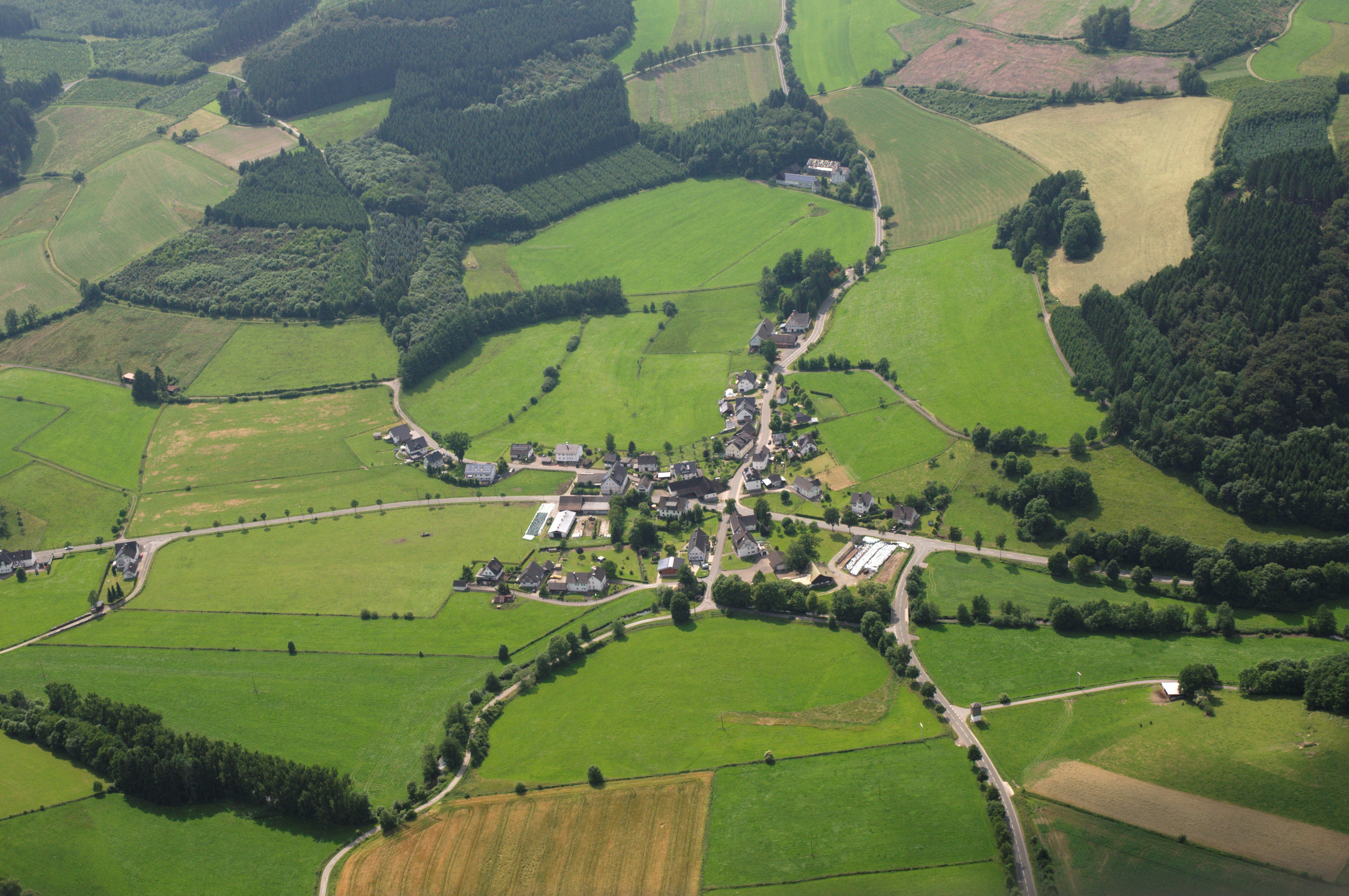
- Interactive map of Menkhausen
- Location within Germany Location within North Rhine-Westphalia
- Coordinates: 51°12′43″N 8°12′52″E
- Country: Germany
- State: North Rhine-Westphalia
- Admin. region: Arnsberg
- District: Hochsauerlandkreis
- Town: Schmallenberg

Population (2021-12-31)
  - Total: 86
- Time zone: UTC+01:00 (CET)
  - Summer (DST): UTC+02:00 (CEST)

Menkhausen is a locality in the municipality Schmallenberg in the district Hochsauerlandkreis in North Rhine-Westphalia, Germany.

The village has 86 inhabitants and lies in the north of the municipality of Schmallenberg at a height of around 330 m. In the village centre the Kreisstraße 32 meets the Kreisstraße 20. The river Wenne flows through the village.

Berghausen borders on the villages of Niederberndorf, Landenbeckerbruch, Niederlandenbeck, Dorlar, Mailar and Grimminghausen. The St. Agatha Chapel the village was built 1667.

The village belonged to the municipality of Berghausen in Amt Schmallenberg until the end of 1974.

== Gallery ==
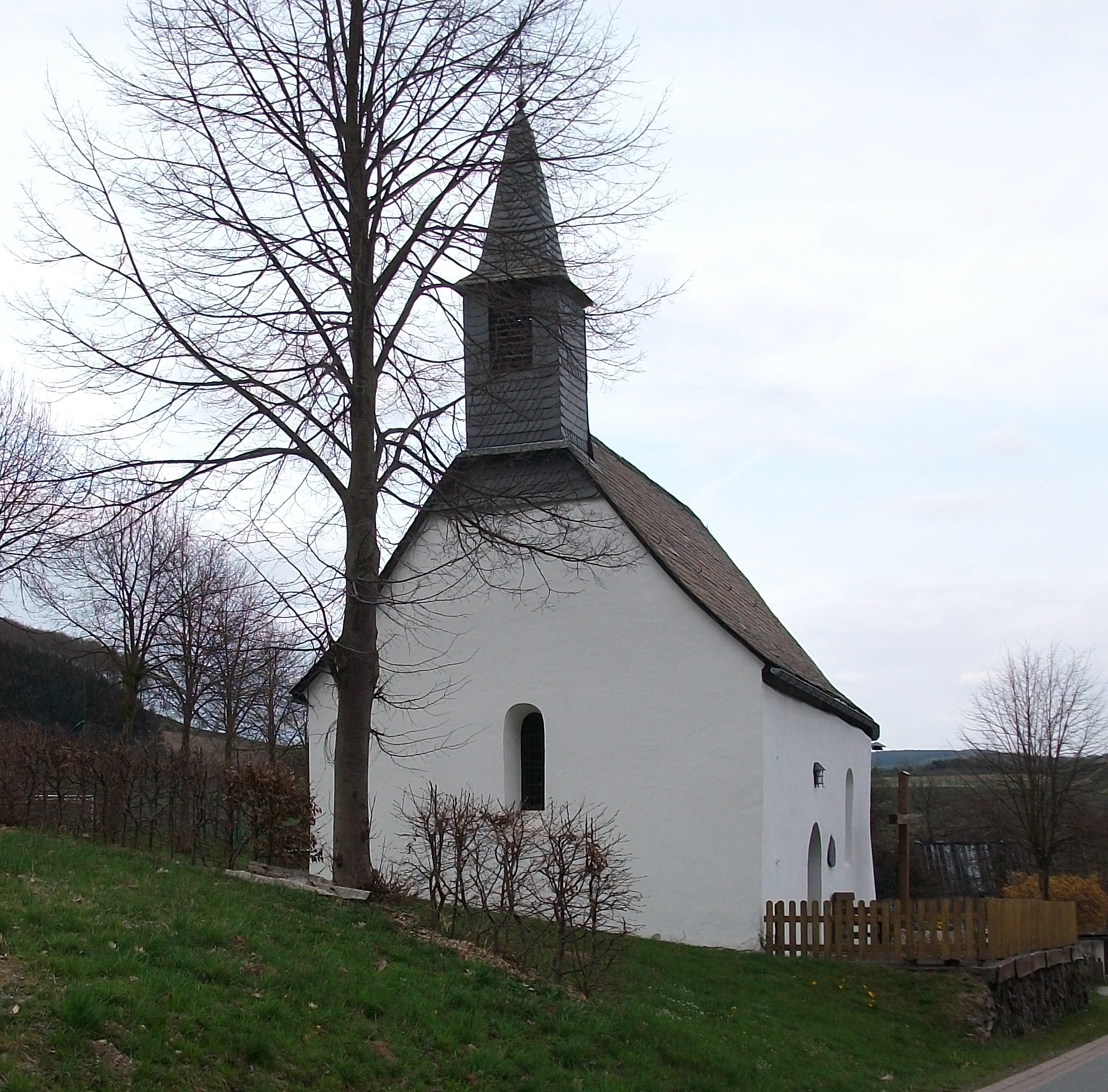
St. Agatha Chapel Anno 1667
