= Arpe (Wenne, Berge) =

River in Germany

Location
- Country: Germany
- State: North Rhine-Westphalia

Physical characteristics
- Mouth
  - location: Wenne
  - coordinates: 51.3356°N 8.1642°E
- Length: 8.709 km (5.412 mi)

Basin features
- Progression: Wenne→ Ruhr→ Rhine→ North Sea

Arpe is a river of North Rhine-Westphalia, Germany, in the west of the Hochsauerlandkreis. It is a left tributary of the Wenne which it joins at Berge, a district of Meschede. It should not be confused with the Arpe, also a left tributary of the Wenne in the Hochsauerlandkreis, but joining at Niederberndorf, a district of Schmallenberg.

== See also ==
- List of rivers of North Rhine-Westphalia
