= Obringhausen =

- Stadtteil of Schmallenberg
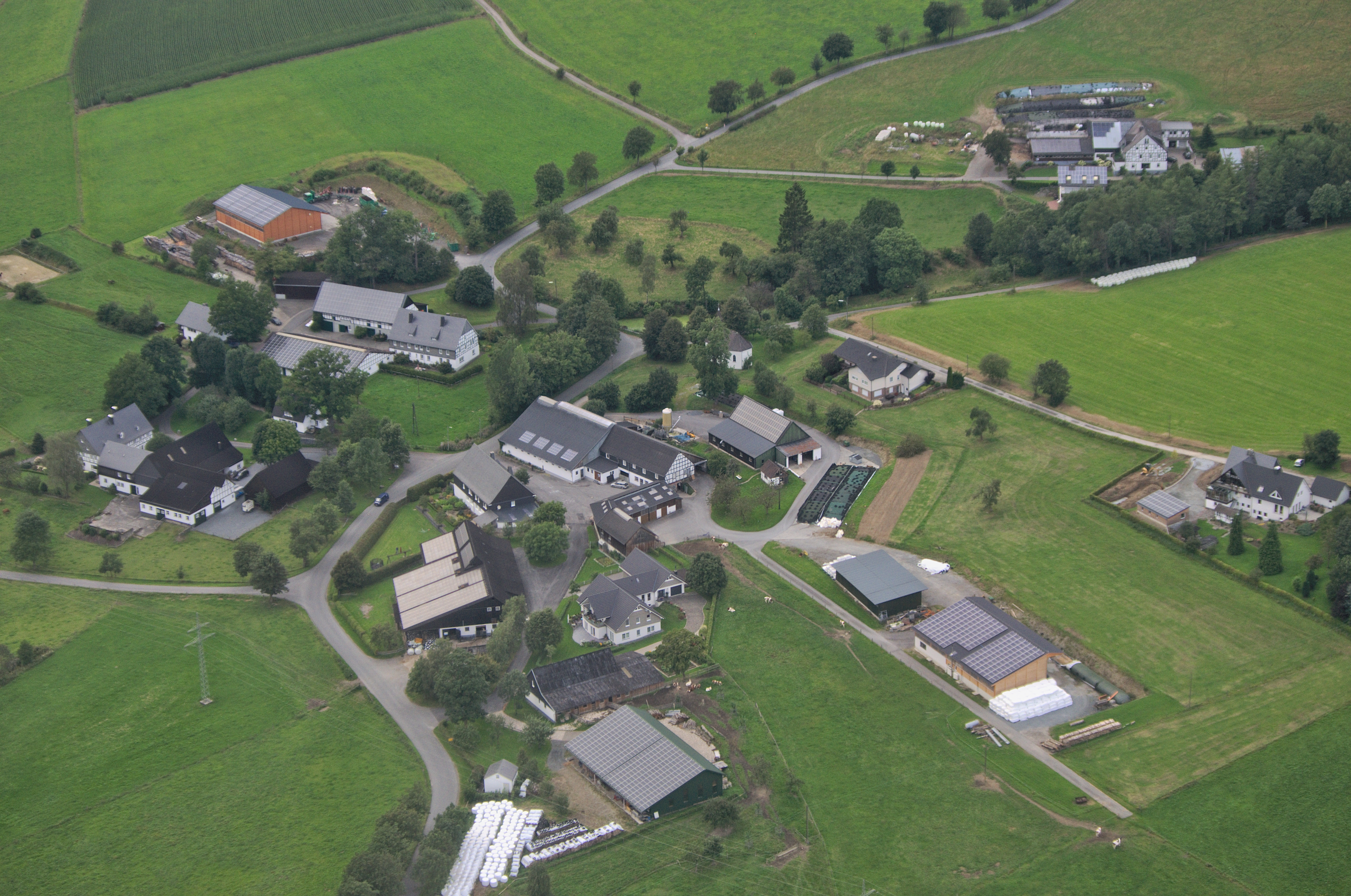
- Interactive map of Obringhausen
- Location within Germany Location within North Rhine-Westphalia
- Coordinates: 51°10′5″N 8°16′52″E
- Country: Germany
- State: North Rhine-Westphalia
- Admin. region: Arnsberg
- District: Hochsauerlandkreis
- Town: Schmallenberg

Population (2021-12-31)
  - Total: 39
- Time zone: UTC+01:00 (CET)
  - Summer (DST): UTC+02:00 (CEST)

Obringhausen is a locality in the municipality Schmallenberg in the district Hochsauerlandkreis in North Rhine-Westphalia, Germany.

The village has 39 inhabitants and lies in the north of the municipality of Schmallenberg at a height of around 420 m. Obringhasuen borders on the villages of Ebbinghof, Gleidorf, Schmallenberg and Wormbach. The Wenne springs in a forest area near Obringhausen.

The first written document mentioning Oytbrechtinchusen dates from 1361. The village used to belong to the municipality of Wormbach in Amt Schmallenberg until the end of 1974.

== Gallery ==
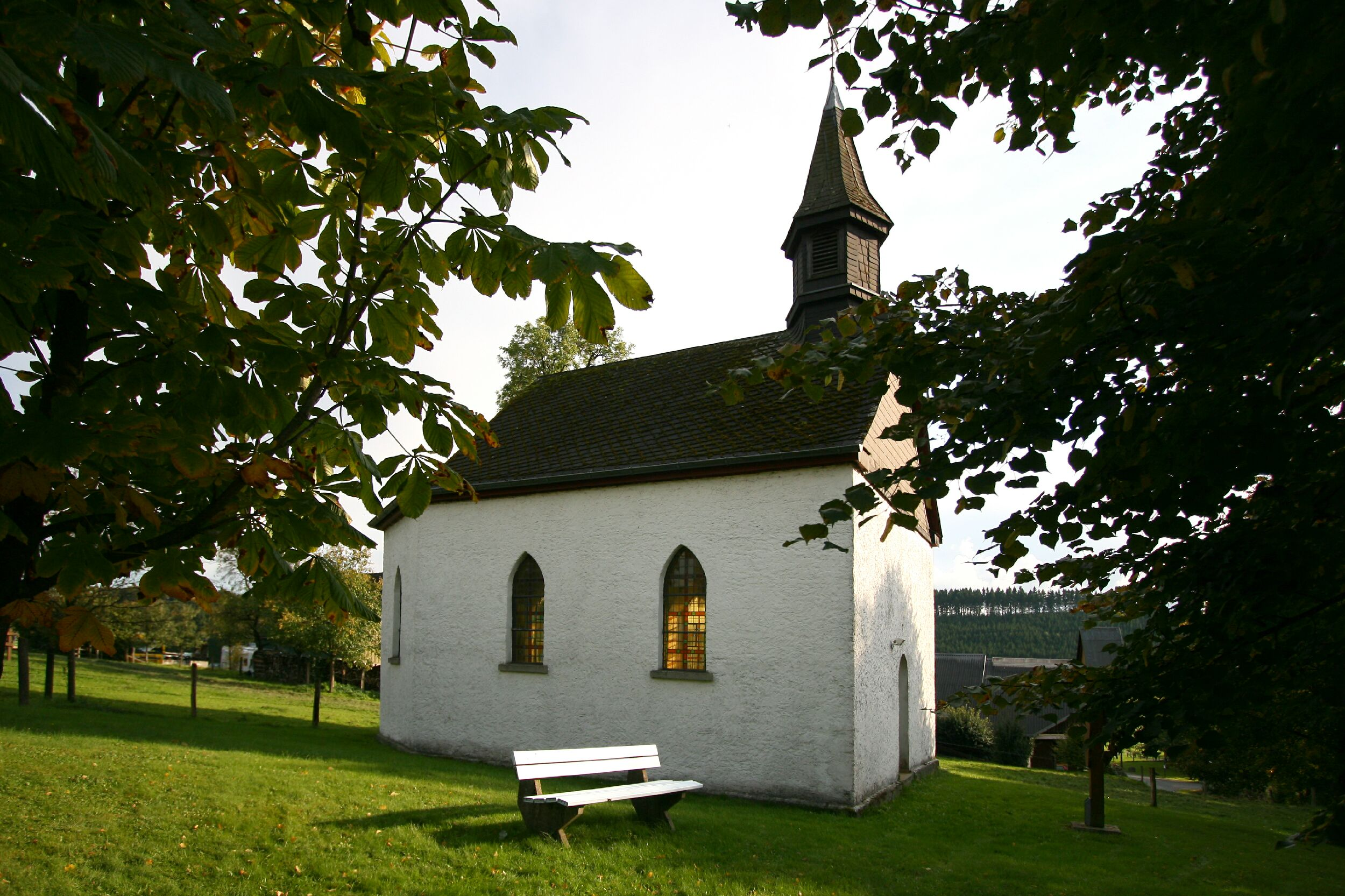
St. Antonius Chapel in Obringhausen, Anno 1877

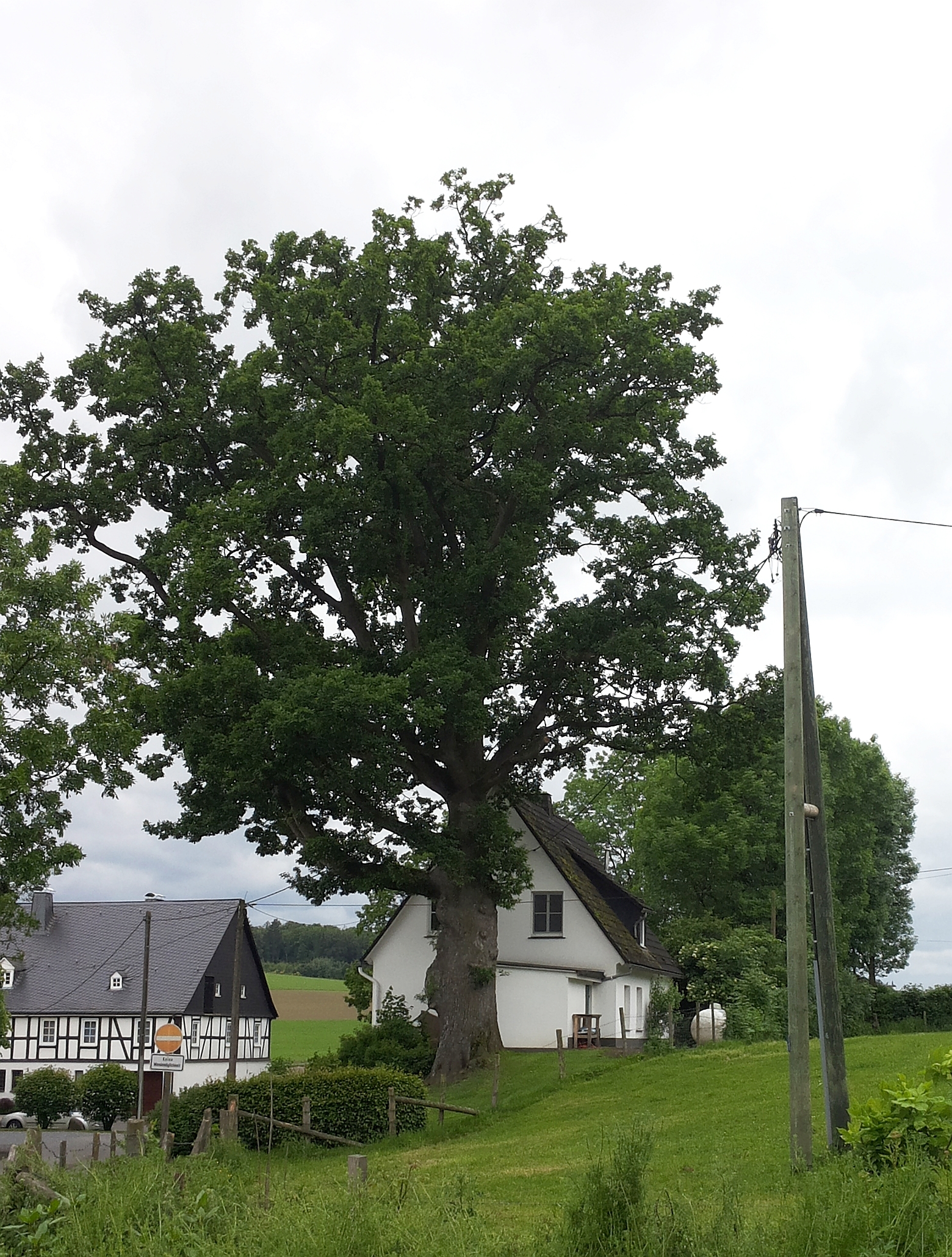
Oak by Obringhausen
