= Salwey =

River in Germany

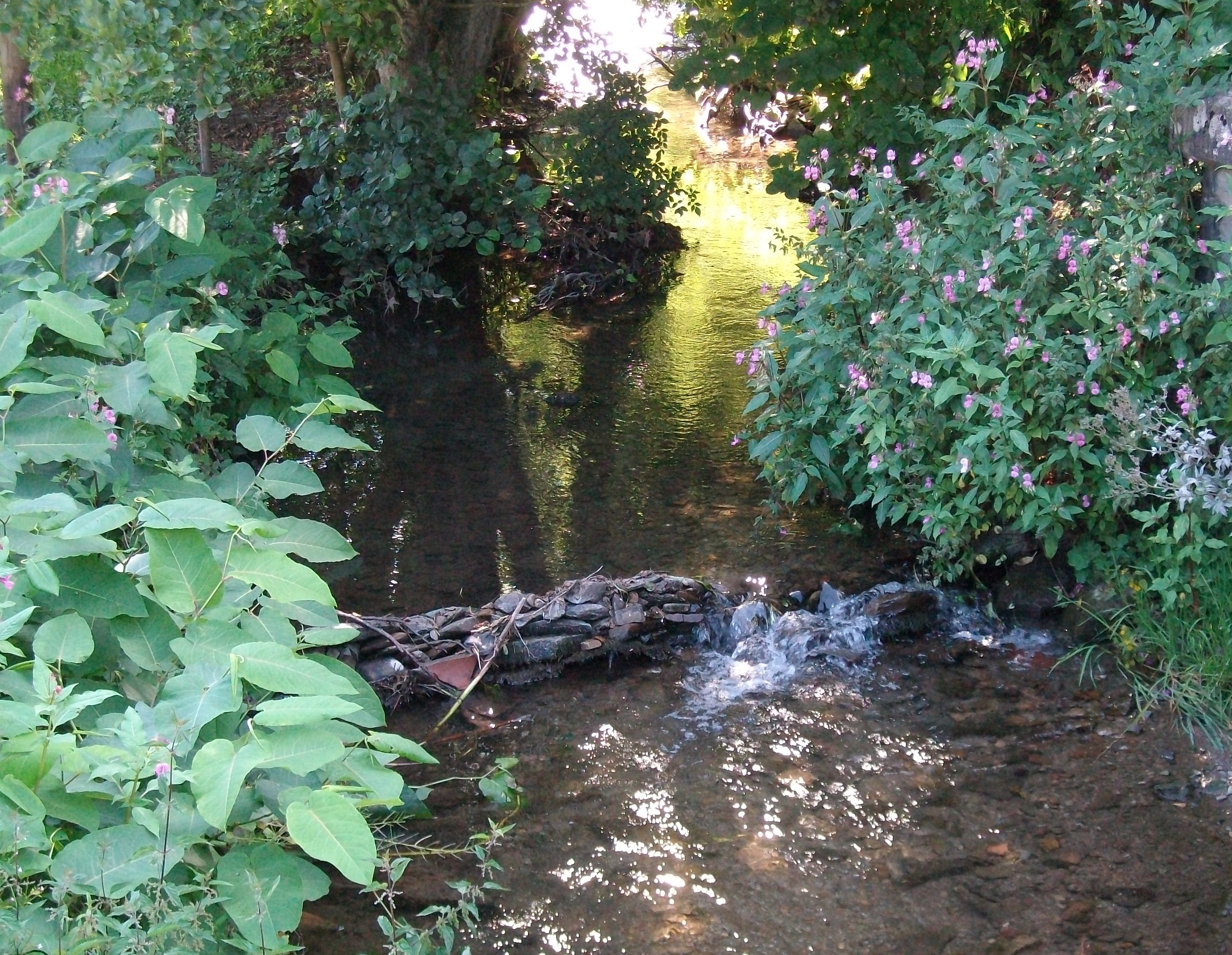

Location
- Country: Germany
- State: North Rhine-Westphalia

Physical characteristics
- Mouth
  - location: Wenne
  - coordinates: 51.2692°N 8.1869°E
- Length: 14.8 km (9.2 mi)

Basin features
- Progression: Wenne→ Ruhr→ Rhine→ North Sea

Salwey (also: Salweybach) is a river of North Rhine-Westphalia, Germany. It flows into the Wenne near Eslohe.

== See also ==
- List of rivers of North Rhine-Westphalia
