= Niederberndorf =

- Stadtteil of Schmallenberg
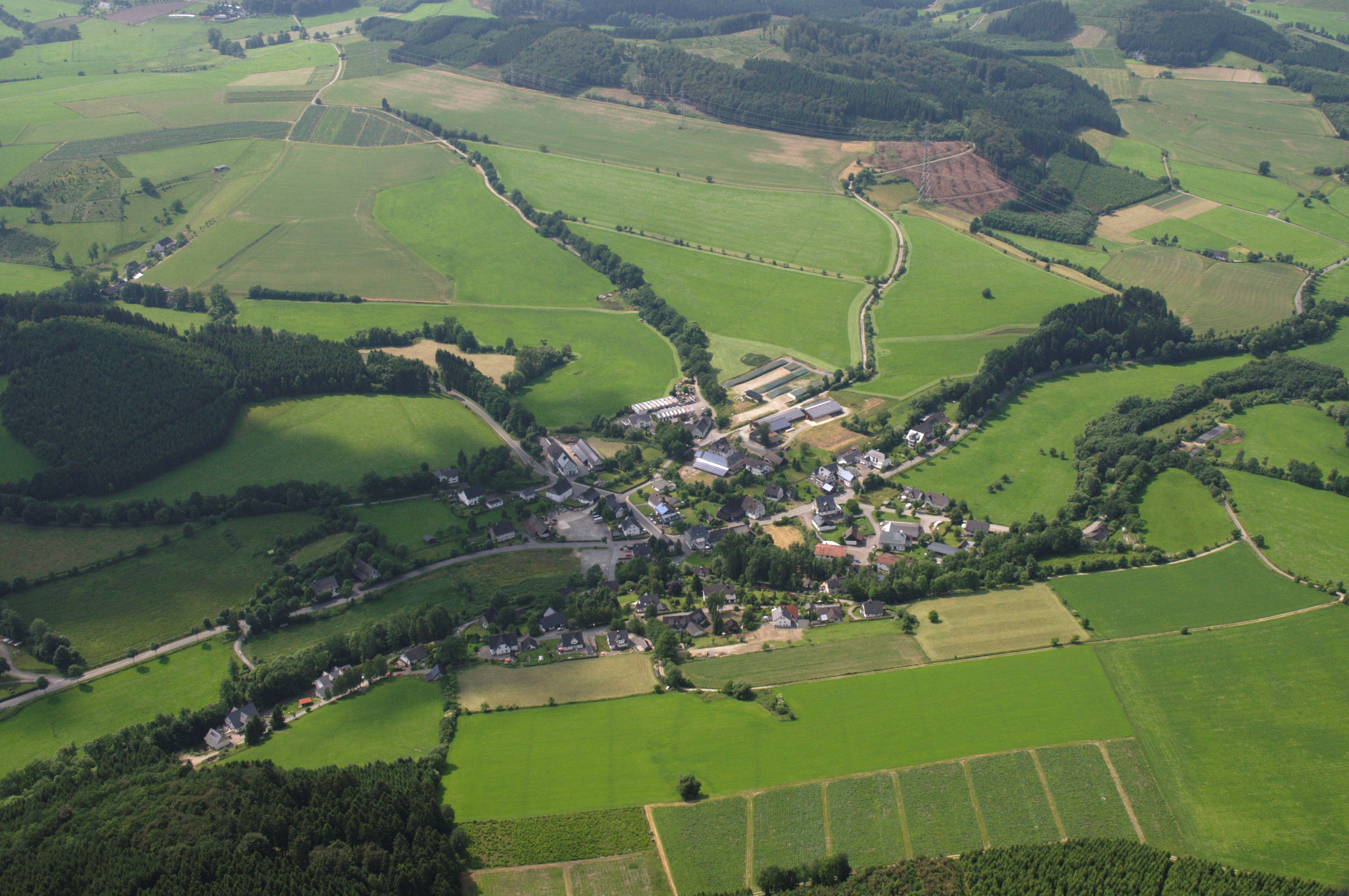
- Interactive map of Niederberndorf
- Location within Germany Location within North Rhine-Westphalia
- Coordinates: 51°11′43″N 8°13′17″E
- Country: Germany
- State: North Rhine-Westphalia
- Admin. region: Arnsberg
- District: Hochsauerlandkreis
- Town: Schmallenberg
- Elevation: 341 m (1,119 ft)

Population (2021-12-31)
  - Total: 205
- Time zone: UTC+01:00 (CET)
  - Summer (DST): UTC+02:00 (CEST)

Niederberndorf is a locality in the municipality of Schmallenberg in the High Sauerland District in North Rhine-Westphalia, Germany.

The village has 205 inhabitants and lies in the northern part of Schmallenberg at an elevation of approximately 341 meters. In the village center, the river Arpe flows into the Wenne, and the Kreisstraße 35 meets the Kreisstraße 32.

Niederberndorf borders the villages of Arpe, Landenbeckerbruch, Menkhausen, Mailar, Heiminghausen, Berghausen, and Oberberndorf. The St. Blaise Chapel in the village center was first mentioned in 1402.

== Gallery ==
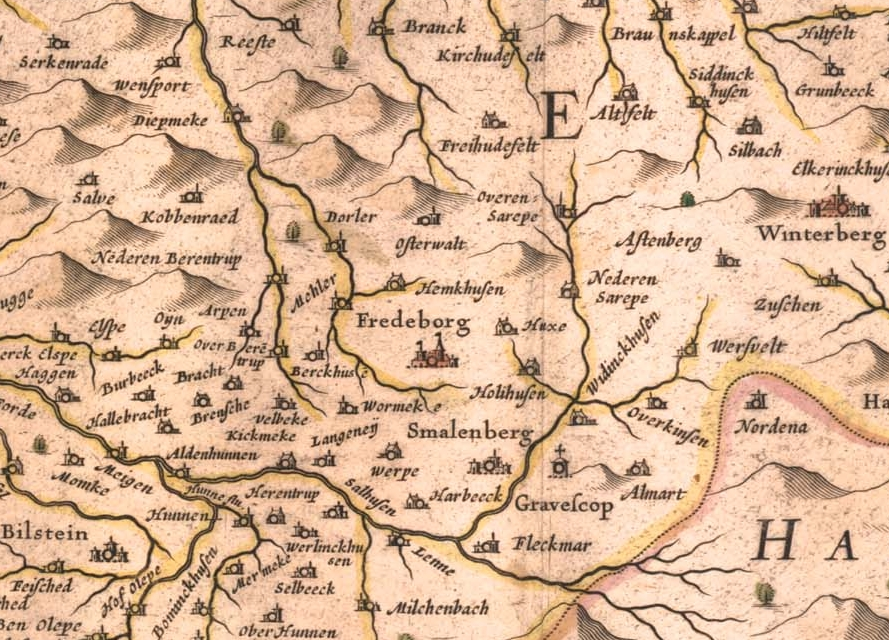
„Nederen Berentrup“ 1645 - Westphalia Ducatus (Duchy of Westphalia)

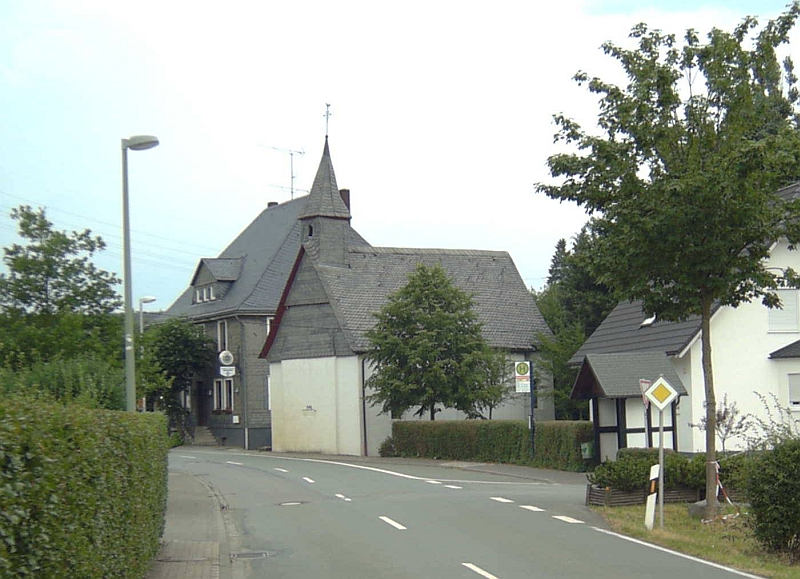
Saint Blaise Chapel in Niederberndorf
