= Carola Matthiesen =

German university teacher (1944 –2015)

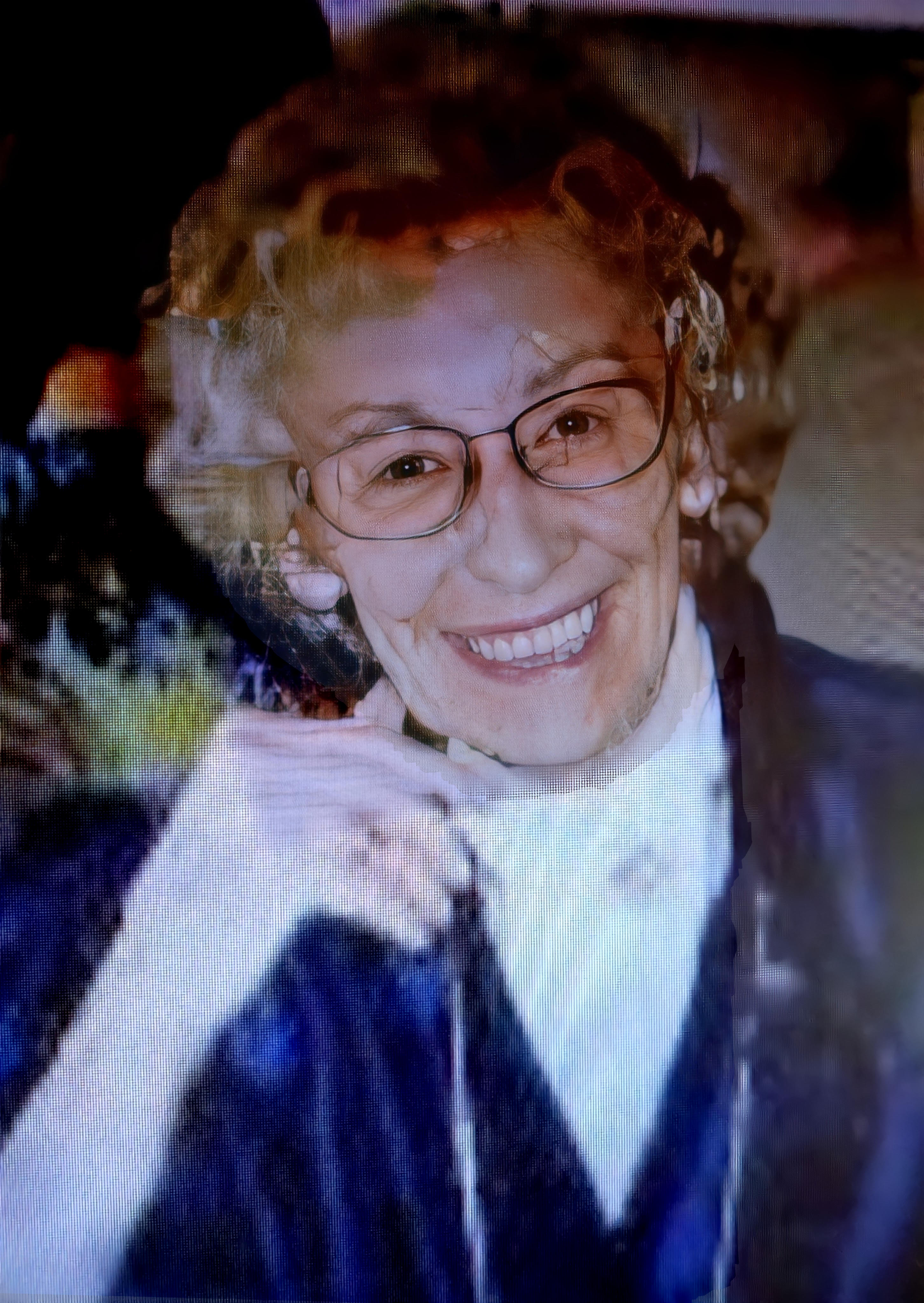
- Born: 9 November 1925; Eslohe, Germany
- Died: 29 April 2015 (aged 89); Meschede
- Occupations: educator, librarian, writer and poet

Carola Matthiesen (9 November 1925 in Eslohe – 29 April 2015) was a German educator, librarian, writer and poet.

== Life ==
After attending school and training as a teacher, Carola Matthiesen briefly pursued her career as a kindergarten teacher. Further training focused on literature followed. She married in 1954 and three years later their son was born. From 1971 –1987, Mathiesen was first the deputy director and then the president of the Meschede City Library. She died on 29 April 2015, and was laid to rest in the South Cemetery on Steinstrasse in Meschede.

Carola Matthiesen was a member of the German Haiku Society, the Westphalian Literary Office, the Christian Lavant Society and the Friends of Poetry in Innsbruck, as well as a founding member of the Koch Christian Society.

== Awards ==
She has received several national and international awards and prizes.

- Haiku Prize for Eulenwinkel and awarding of the title “Senryumeister” from the German Haiku Society e.V. in 2001
- 1st prize in the Haiku competition of the German Haiku Society e.V. in 1999
- 1st Prize Sonnet (as an art form within poetry) from the Society of Poetry Friends in 1995
- 1st prize for ballad poetry from the Society of Poetry Friends in 1994
- Reader's Prize from the Society of Poetry Friends 1993
- Nomination of the volume of poetry “Light of the Star Fields” for the Book Prize of the Evangelical Church of Germany in 1989

== Works ==
- Heiter bis wolkig im Sauerland und anderswo, Brilon, Podszun, 2005, ISBN 3-86133-411-9
- Mit leisem Atem, Göttingen, Graphikum Mock, 2001, ISBN 3-88996-452-4
- Spinnwebentage, Meschede, Wullenweber, 1992, ISBN 3-926852-05-4
- Dämmergrün vor meinem Fenster, Meschede, Wullenweber, 1989, ISBN 3-926852-03-8
- Licht von Sternenfeldern, Meschede, Wullenweber, 1987, ISBN 3-926852-01-1
