= Grimminghausen (Schmallenberg) =

- Stadtteil of Schmallenberg
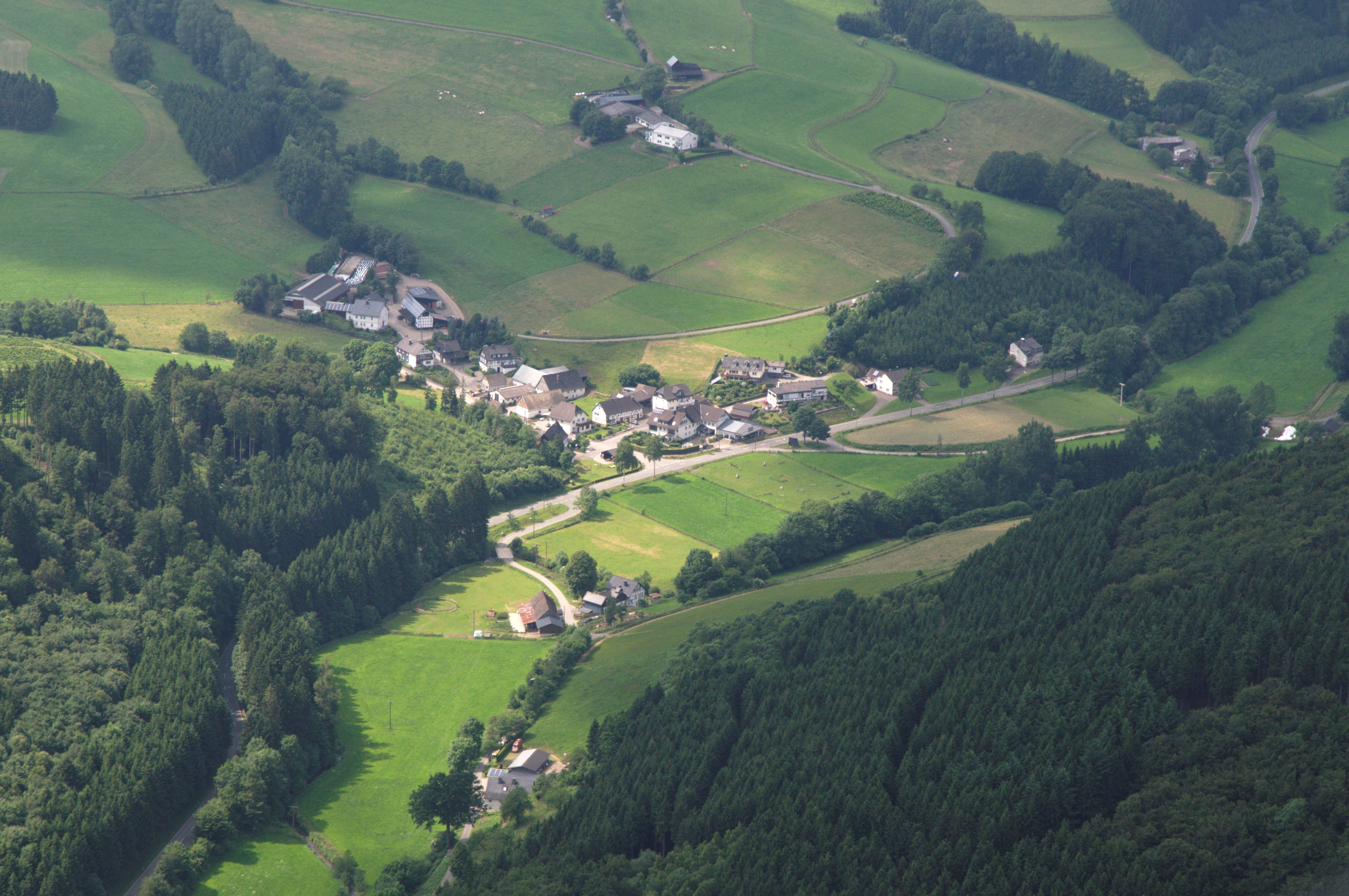
- Interactive map of Grimminghausen
- Location within Germany Location within North Rhine-Westphalia
- Coordinates: 51°13′11″N 8°12′38″E
- Country: Germany
- State: North Rhine-Westphalia
- Admin. region: Arnsberg
- District: Hochsauerlandkreis
- Town: Schmallenberg

Population (2021-12-31)
  - Total: 52
- Time zone: UTC+01:00 (CET)
  - Summer (DST): UTC+02:00 (CEST)

Grimminghausen is a locality in the municipality Schmallenberg in the district Hochsauerlandkreis in North Rhine-Westphalia, Germany.

== Geography ==
The village has 52 inhabitants and lies in the west of the municipality of Schmallenberg at a height of around 329 m on the Kreisstraße 38. The river Wenne flows through the village. Grimminghausen borders on the villages of Menkhausen, Lochtrop, Dorlar and Hengsbeck.

== History ==
The first written document mentioning "Grimmardichusen" dates from 1282. The first chapel in the village was built around 1600. In 1900 was the new St. Peter and Paul Chapel built. The village used to belong to the municipality of Dorlar until the end of 1974.

== Gallery ==
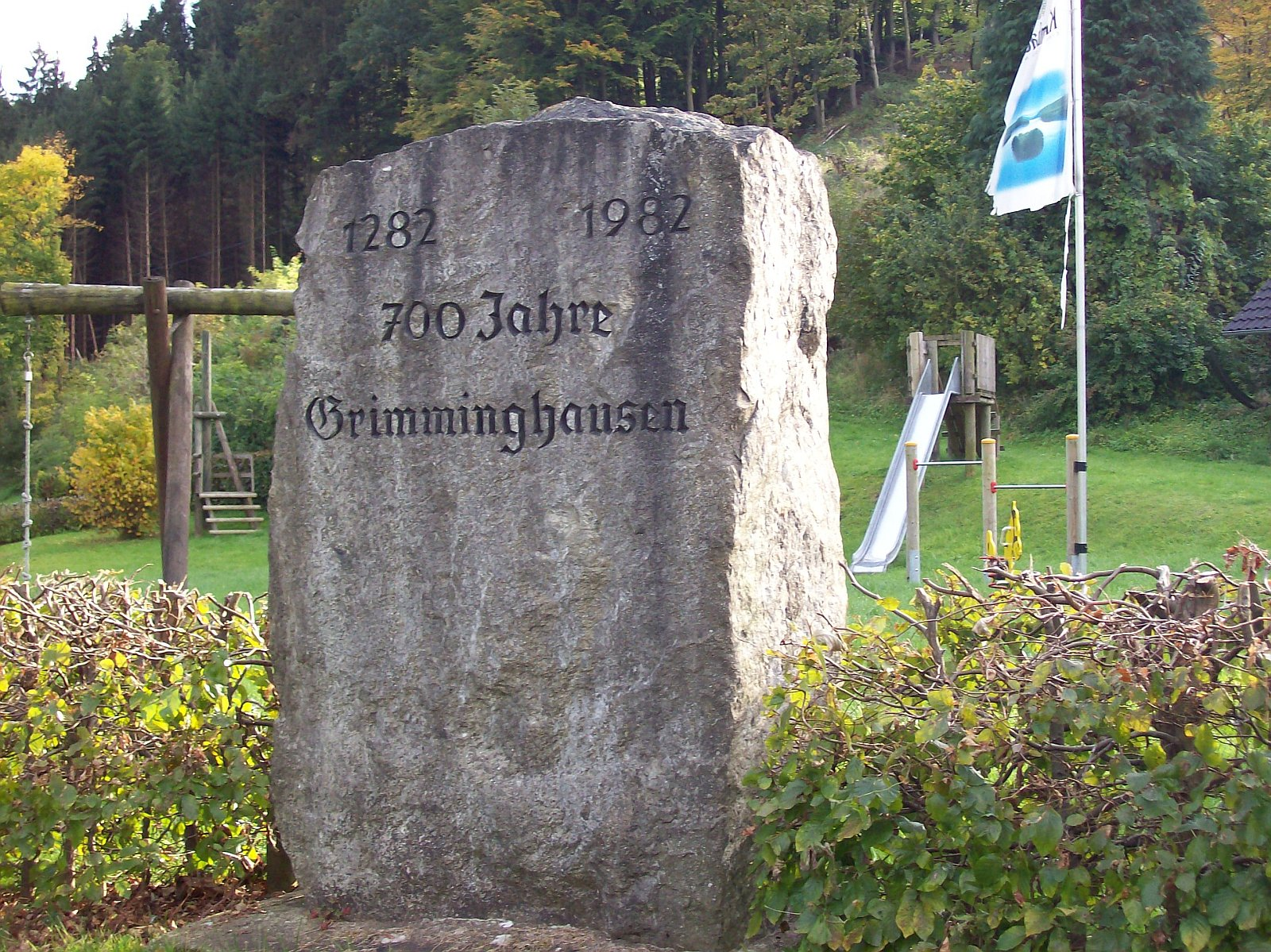
Stone 700 years Grimminghausen

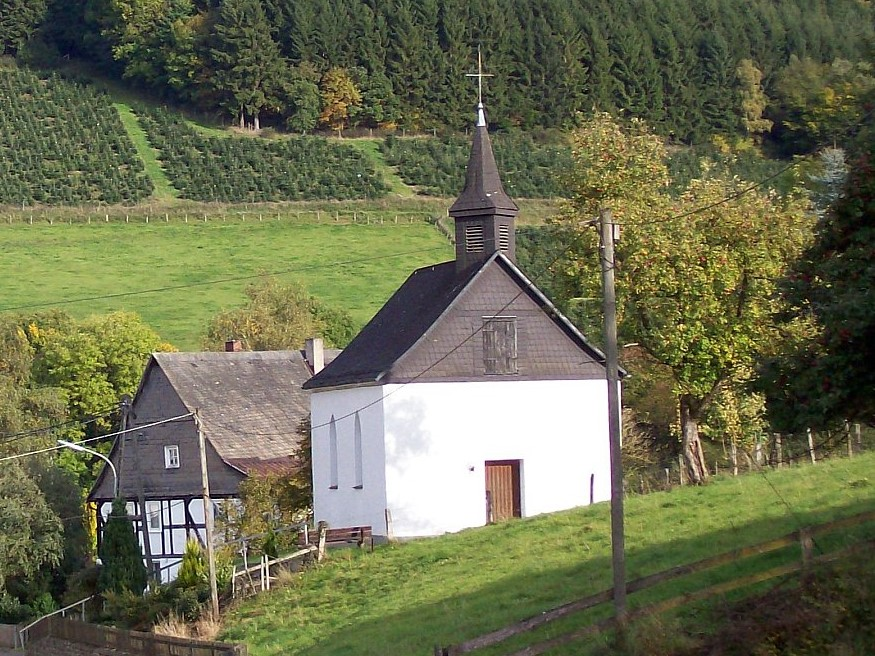
Chapel St. Peter and Paul, Anno 1900

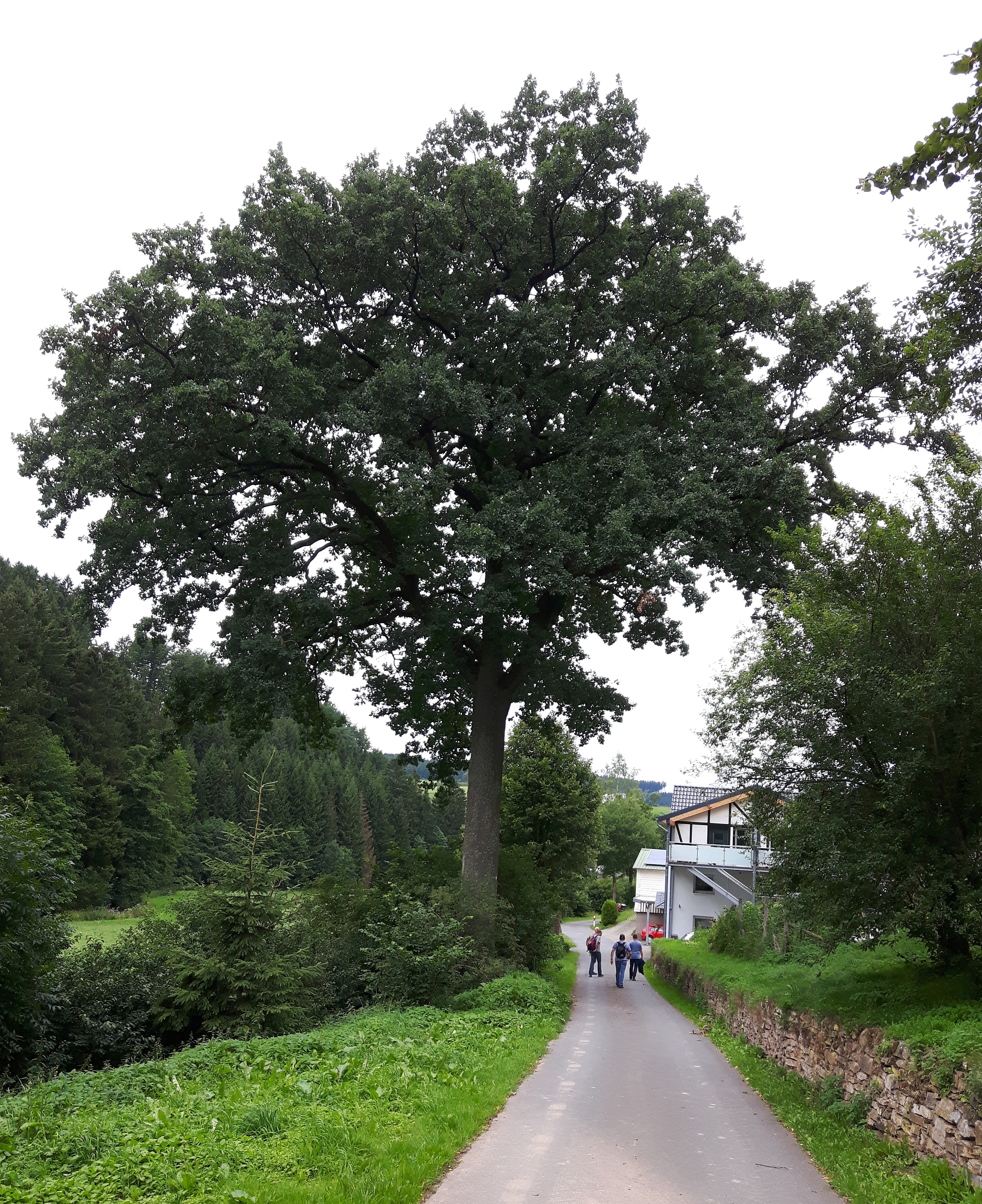
Natural monument, English oak that characterizes the landscape

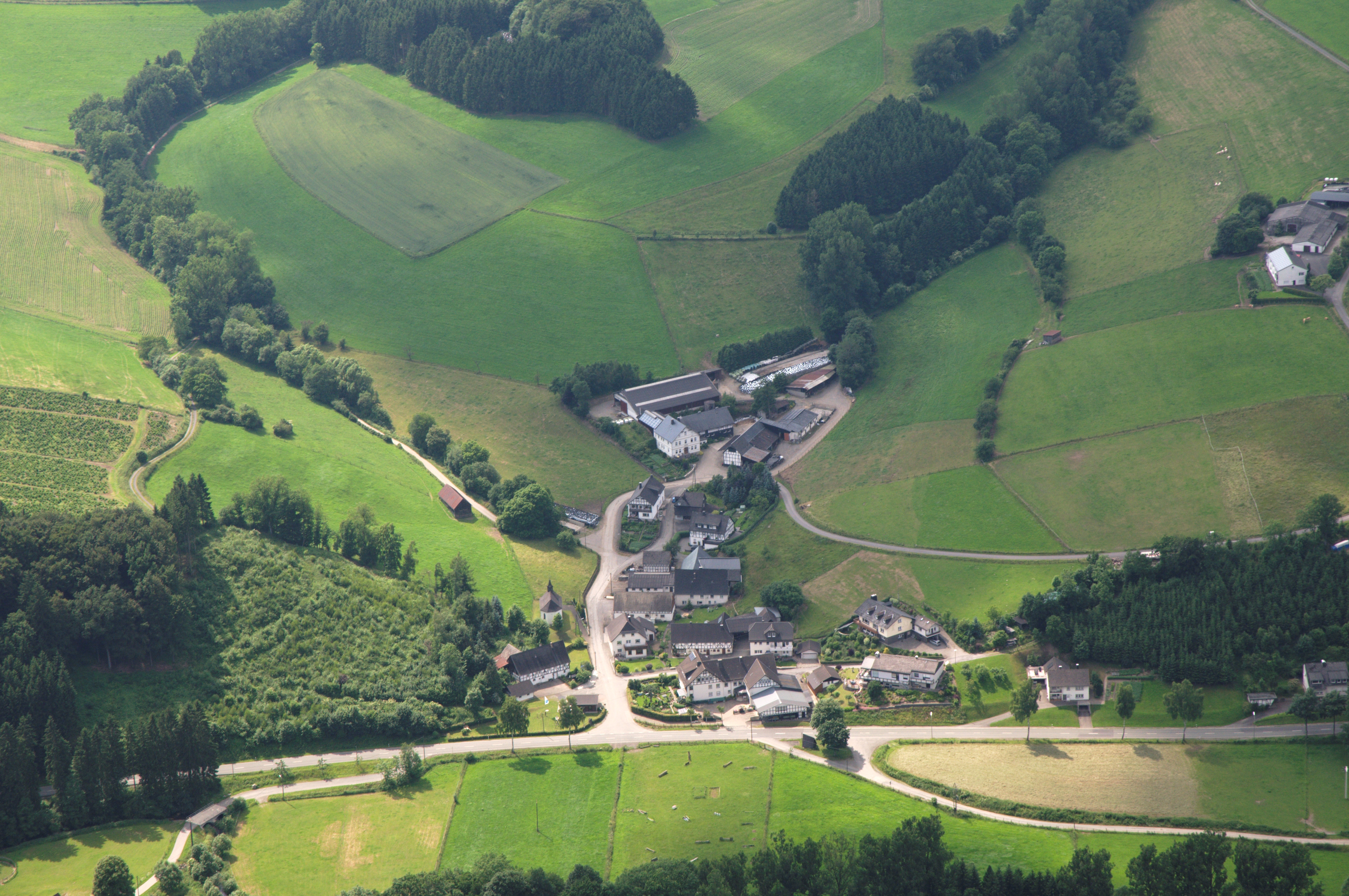
Aerial photograph of Grimminghausen
