= Ebbinghof =

- Stadtteil of Schmallenberg
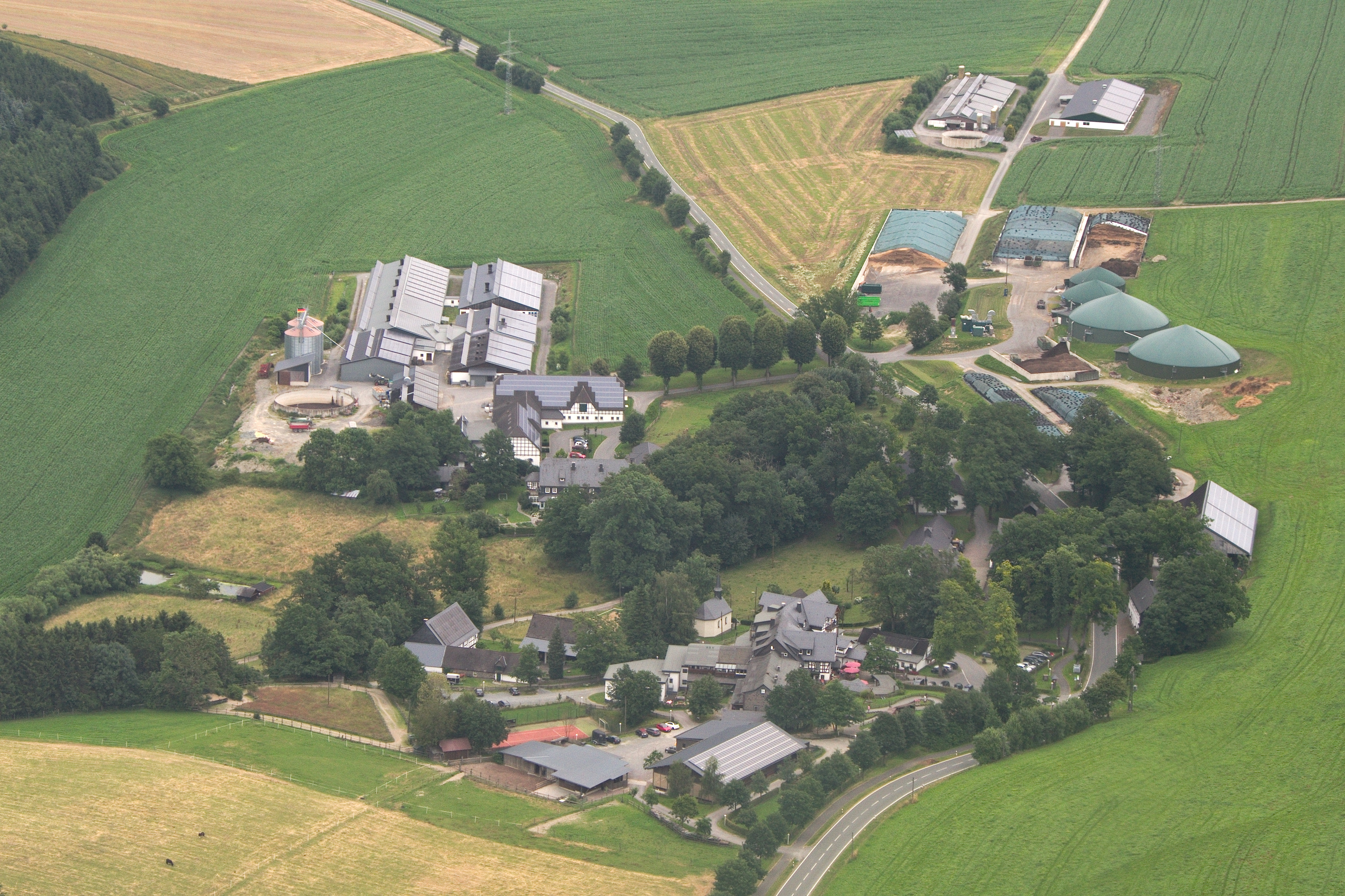
- Interactive map of Ebbinghof
- Location within Germany Location within North Rhine-Westphalia
- Coordinates: 51°10′48″N 8°17′6″E
- Country: Germany
- State: North Rhine-Westphalia
- Admin. region: Arnsberg
- District: Hochsauerlandkreis
- Town: Schmallenberg

Population (2021-12-31)
  - Total: 23
- Time zone: UTC+01:00 (CET)
  - Summer (DST): UTC+02:00 (CEST)

Ebbinghof is a locality in the municipality Schmallenberg in the district Hochsauerlandkreis in North Rhine-Westphalia, Germany.

The village has 23 inhabitants and lies in the north of the municipality of Schmallenberg at a height of around 420 m. Ebbinghof borders on the villages of Altenhof, Bad Fredeburg, Berghausen, Gleidorf, Obringhausen, Schmallenberg and Wormbach.

The village used to belong to the municipality of Wormbach in Amt Schmallenberg until the end of 1974.
