= Dorlar =

- Stadtteil of Schmallenberg
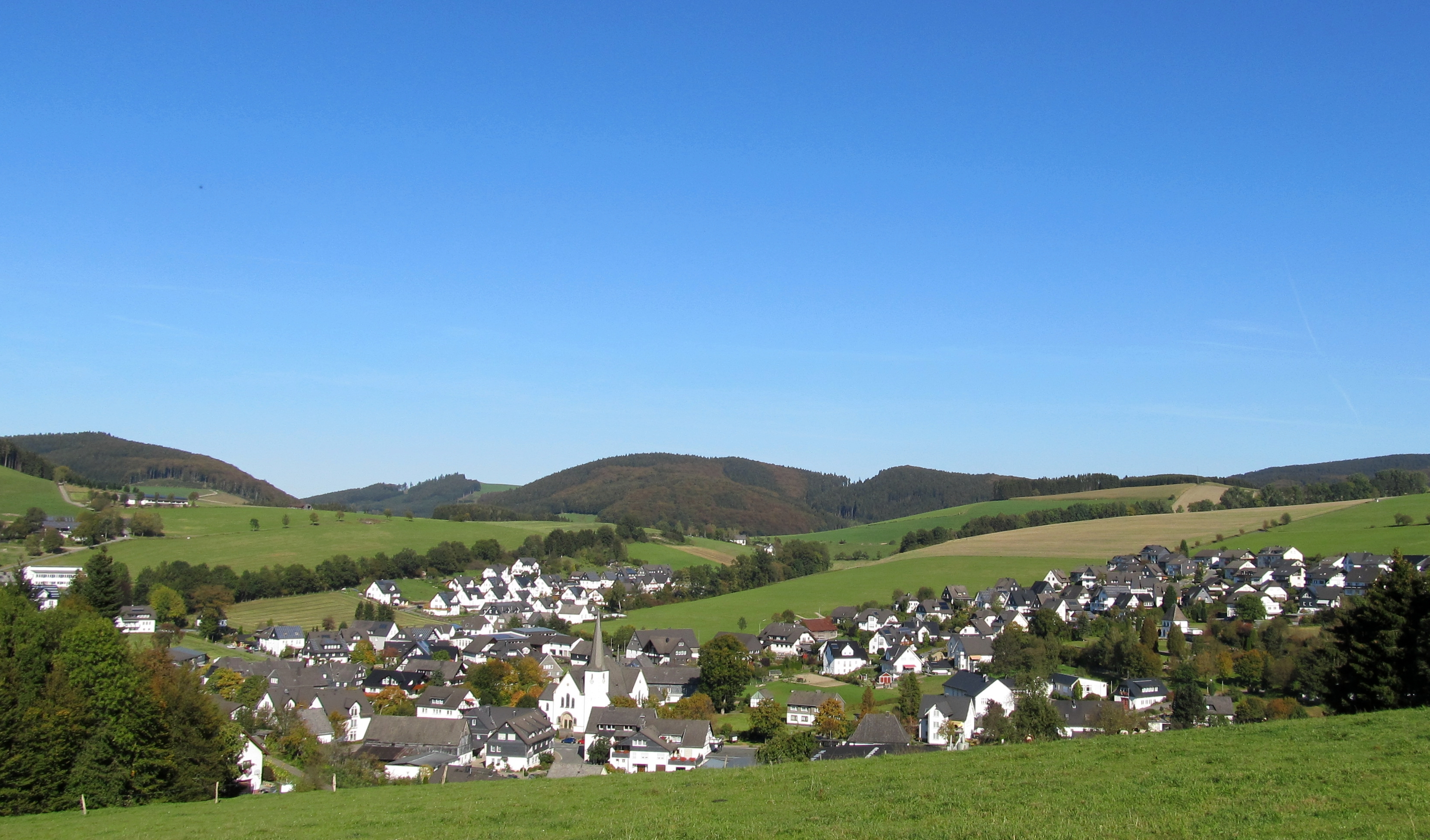
- Interactive map of Dorlar
- Location within Germany Location within North Rhine-Westphalia
- Coordinates: 51°13′12″N 8°14′02″E
- Country: Germany
- State: North Rhine-Westphalia
- Admin. region: Arnsberg
- District: Hochsauerlandkreis
- Town: Schmallenberg

Population (2021-12-31)
  - Total: 849
- Time zone: UTC+01:00 (CET)
  - Summer (DST): UTC+02:00 (CEST)

Dorlar is a locality in the municipality Schmallenberg in the district Hochsauerlandkreis in North Rhine-Westphalia, Germany.

The village has 849 inhabitants and lies in the north of the municipality of Schmallenberg at a height of around 340 m. In the village centre the Bundesstraße 236 federal road meets the Kreisstraße 20. Dorlar borders on the villages of Frielinghausen, Nierentrop, Kirchilpe, Twismecke, Sellinghausen, Mailar, Grimminghausen, Menkhausen and Berghof.

== Gallery ==
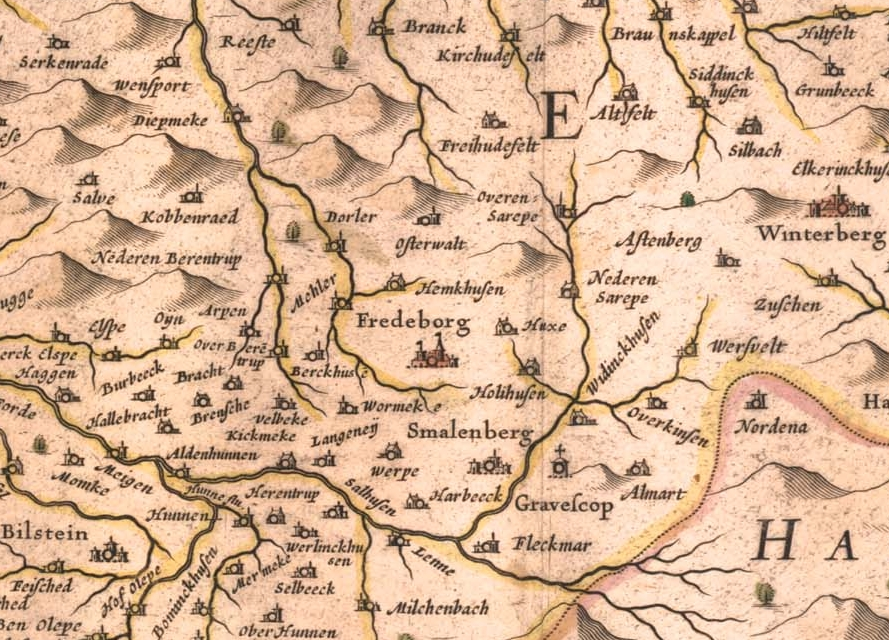
„Dorler“ 1645 - Westphalia Ducatus (Duchy of Westphalia)

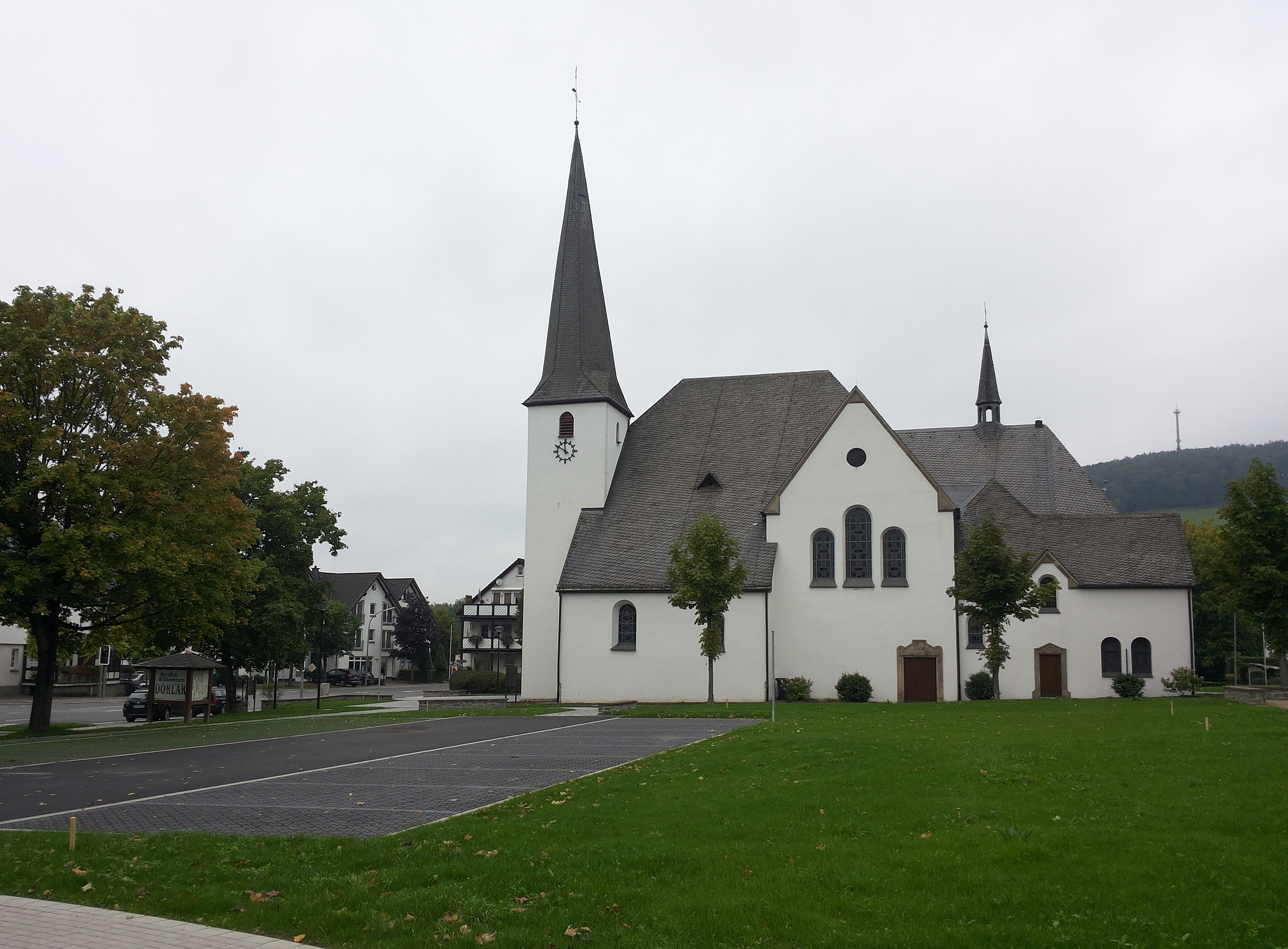
Dorlar, St. Hubertus
