= Bremke (Eslohe) =

- Ortsteil of Eslohe
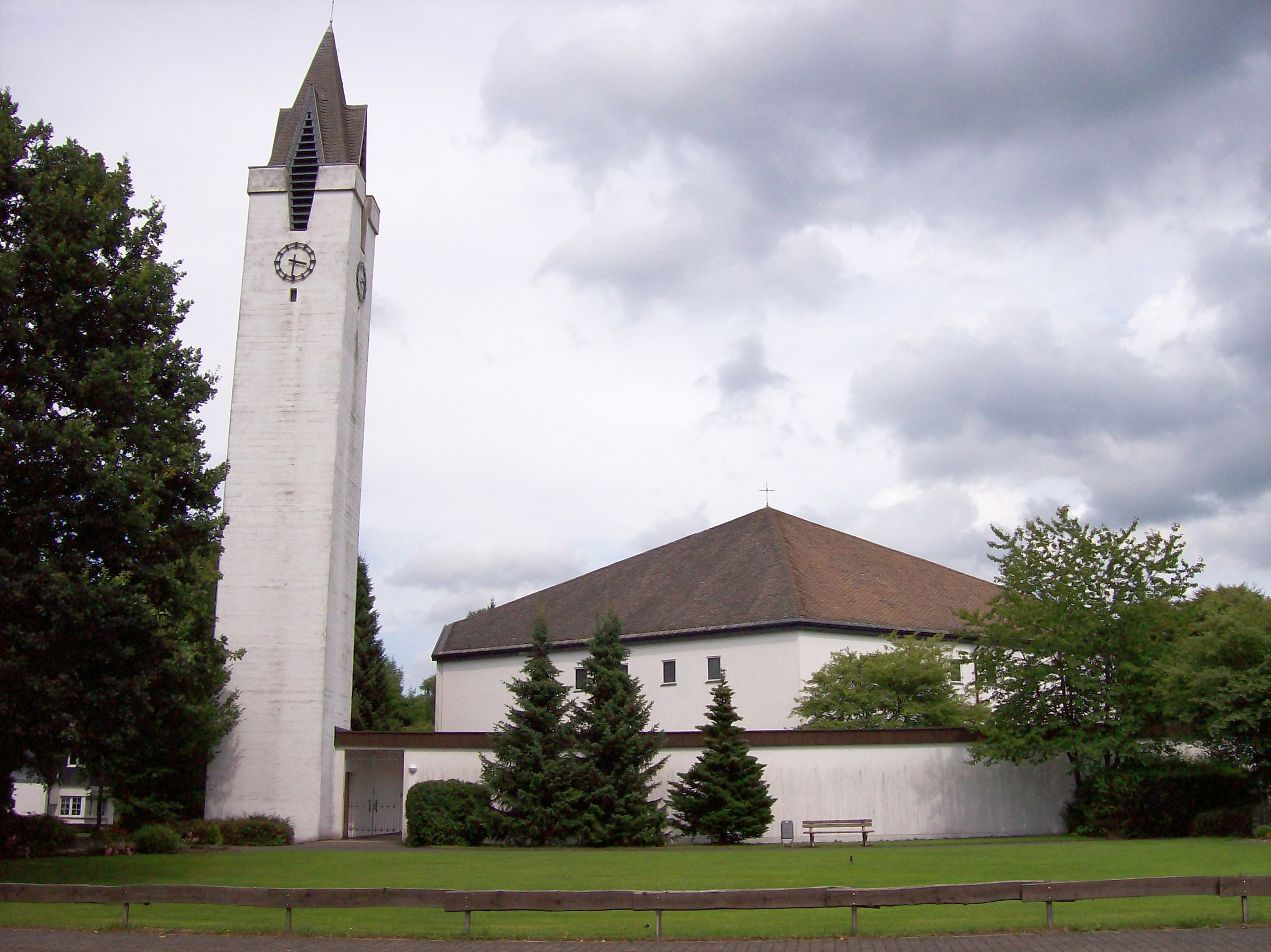
- St.-Antonius-Pfarrkirche
- Interactive map of Bremke
- Location within Germany Location within North Rhine-Westphalia
- Coordinates: 51°15′N 8°12.5′E
- Country: Germany
- State: North Rhine-Westphalia
- Admin. region: Arnsberg
- District: Hochsauerlandkreis
- Municipality: Eslohe
- Elevation: 300 m (980 ft)

Population (2010-12-31)
  - Total: 615
- Time zone: UTC+01:00 (CET)
  - Summer (DST): UTC+02:00 (CEST)
- Postal codes: 59889
- Dialling codes: 02973

Bremke is a village in the municipality of Eslohe in the North Rhine-Westphalian district of Hochsauerlandkreis.

The village has 615 inhabitants and lies in the east of the municipality of Eslohe at a height of around 300 m. The river Wenne flows through the village. In the village centre the B 511 federal road meets the B 55. Just after the entrance to the village is the parish church of St. Anthony. The village used to belong to the municipality of Reiste in Amt Eslohe until the end of 1974. Bremke borders on the parishes of Eslohe, Frielinghausen and Reiste. The village lies at the junction of the B 55 and 511. From 1911 to 1994 Bremke even had a railway station, but passenger services on the Wenholthausen-Altenhundem railway were withdrawn by 1964.
