= Berghausen (Schmallenberg) =

Village in North Rhine-Westphalia, Germany

- Stadtteil of Schmallenberg
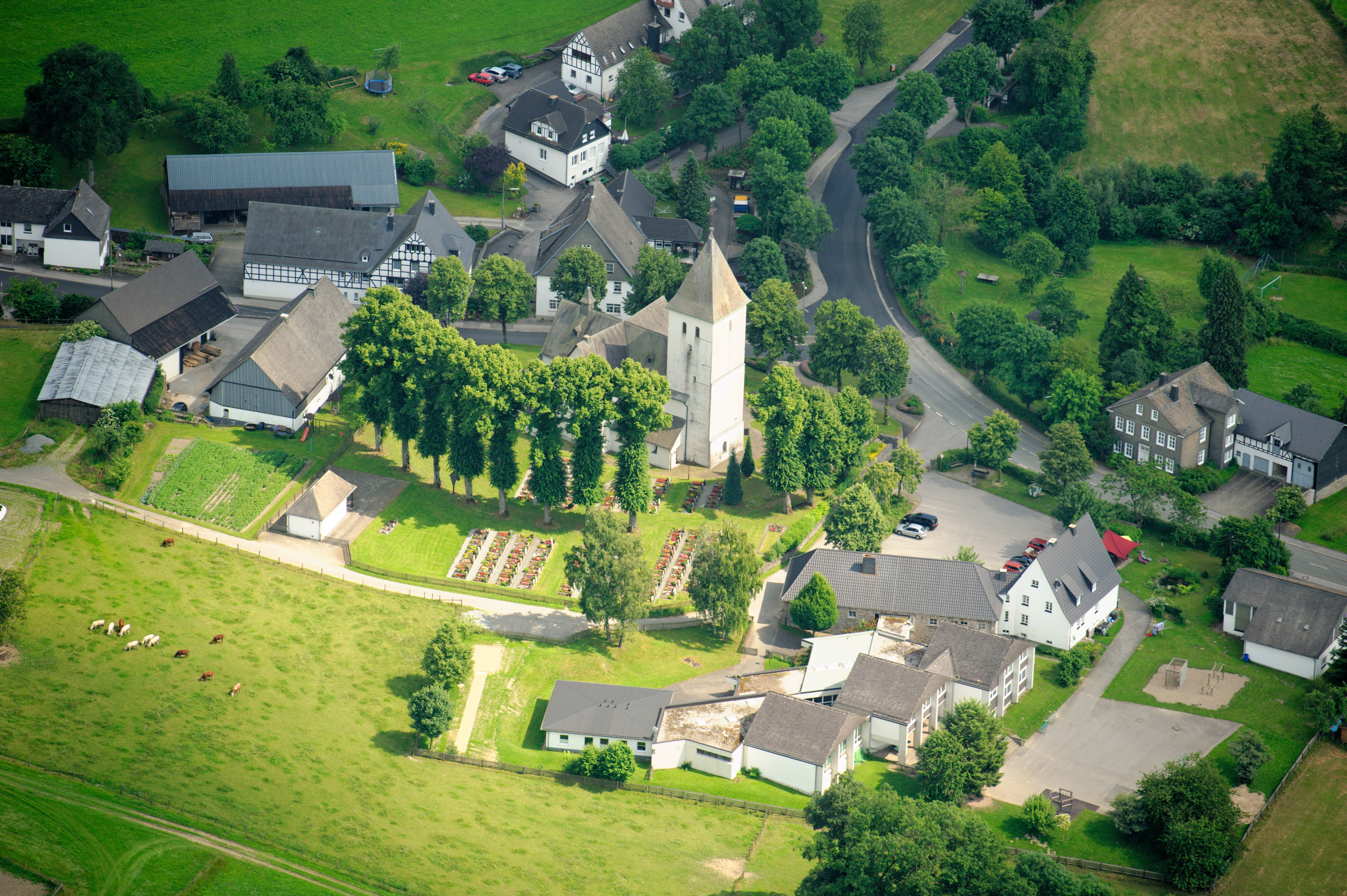
- Interactive map of Berghausen
- Location within Germany Location within North Rhine-Westphalia
- Coordinates: 51°11′10″N 8°14′40″E
- Country: Germany
- State: North Rhine-Westphalia
- Admin. region: Arnsberg
- District: Hochsauerlandkreis
- Town: Schmallenberg

Population (2021-12-31)
  - Total: 221
- Time zone: UTC+01:00 (CET)
  - Summer (DST): UTC+02:00 (CEST)

Berghausen is a locality in the municipality Schmallenberg in the district Hochsauerlandkreis in North Rhine-Westphalia, Germany.

The village has 221 inhabitants and lies in the north of the municipality of Schmallenberg at a height of around 394 m. In the village centre the Kreisstraße 25 meets the Kreisstraße 32.

Berghausen borders on the villages of Ebbinghof, Wormbach, Oberberndorf, Niederberndorf and Heiminghausen. The St. Cyriakus Church in the village center was built around 1220.

The village used to belong to the municipality of Berghausen in Amt Schmallenberg until the end of 1974.

== Gallery ==
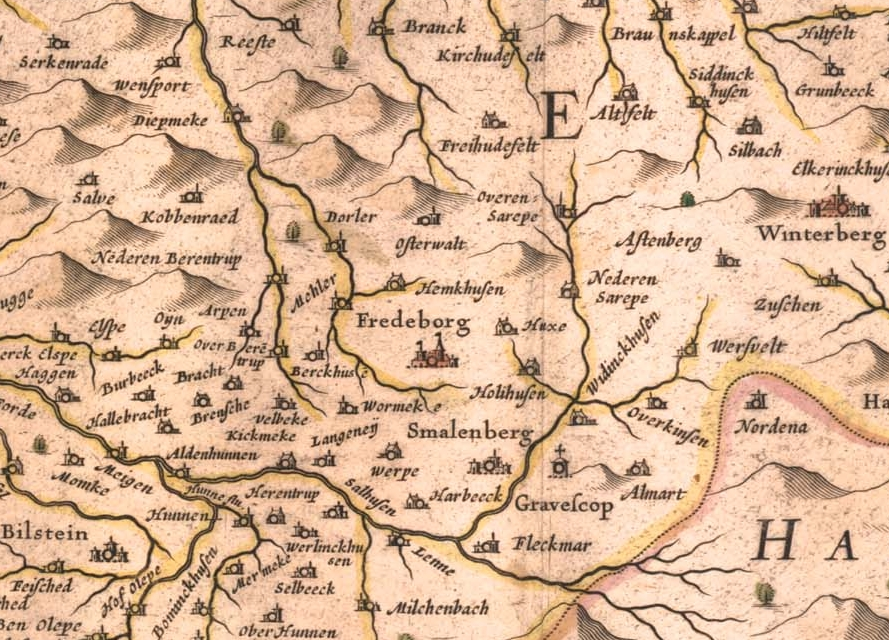
„Berckhuse“ 1645 - Westphalia Ducatus (Duchy of Westphalia)

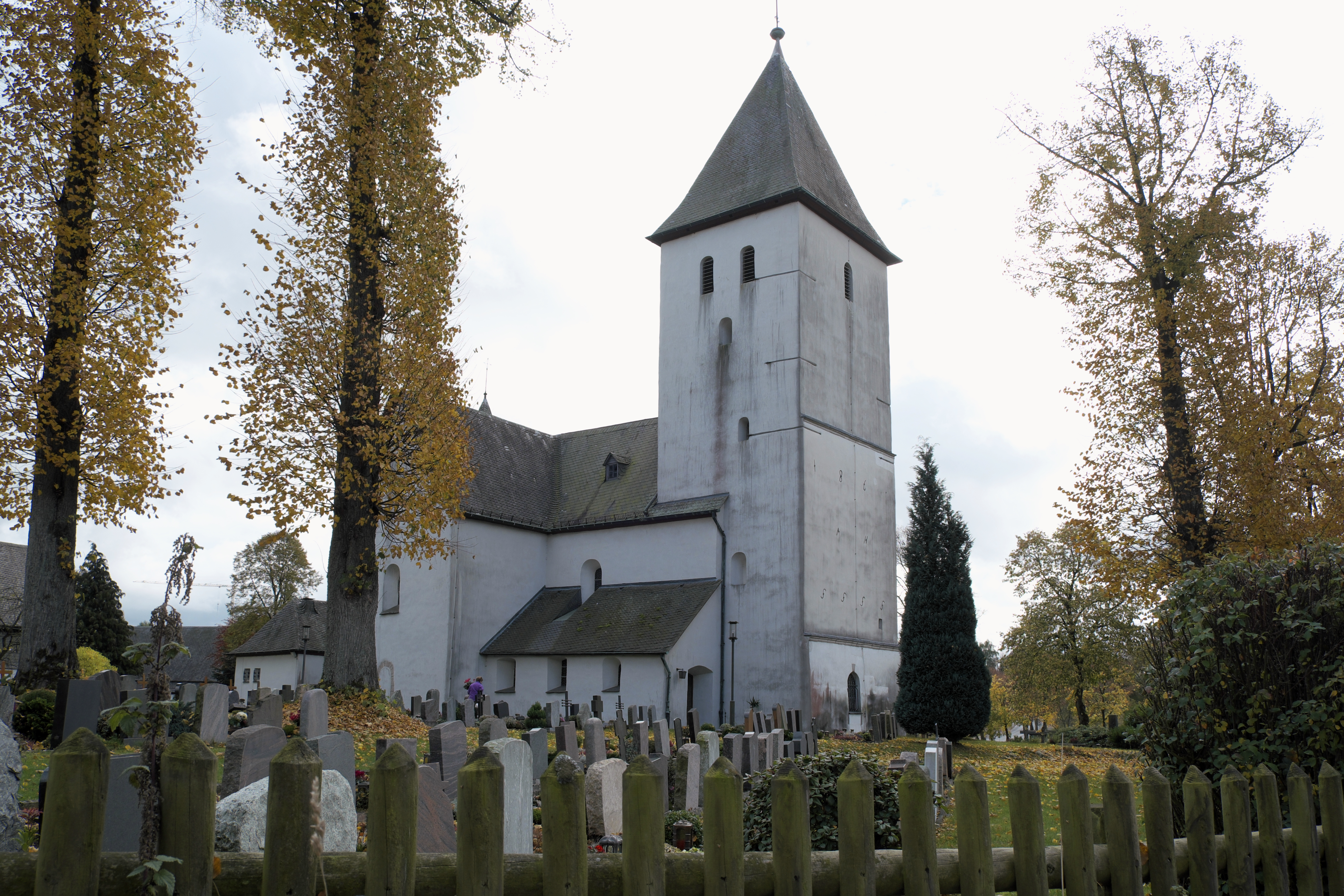
St. Cyriakus Church
