= Eslohe =

- Municipality
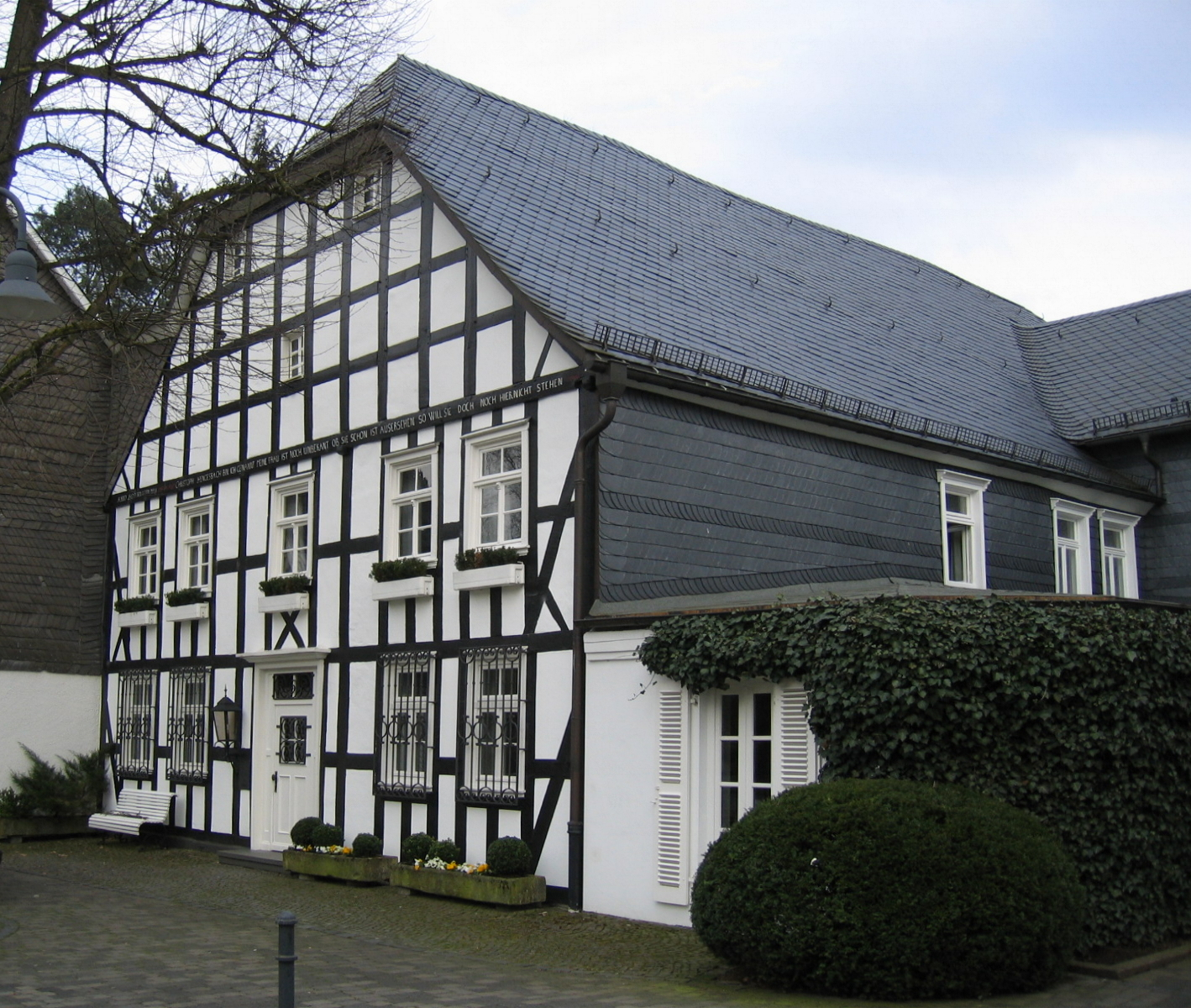
- Timbered house in Eslohe

- Coat of arms

- Location of Eslohe within Hochsauerlandkreis district
- Interactive map of Eslohe
- Location within Germany Location within North Rhine-Westphalia
- Coordinates: 51°15′N 8°10′E
- Country: Germany
- State: North Rhine-Westphalia
- Admin. region: Arnsberg
- District: Hochsauerlandkreis
- Subdivisions: 4

Government
  - Mayor (2020–25): Stephan Kersting (CDU)

Area
  - Total: 113.37 km^{2} (43.77 sq mi)
- Elevation: 404 m (1,325 ft)

Population (2025-12-31)
  - Total: 8,587
  - Density: 75.74/km^{2} (196.2/sq mi)
- Time zone: UTC+01:00 (CET)
  - Summer (DST): UTC+02:00 (CEST)
- Postal codes: 59889
- Dialling codes: 02973
- Vehicle registration: HSK
- Website: www.eslohe.de

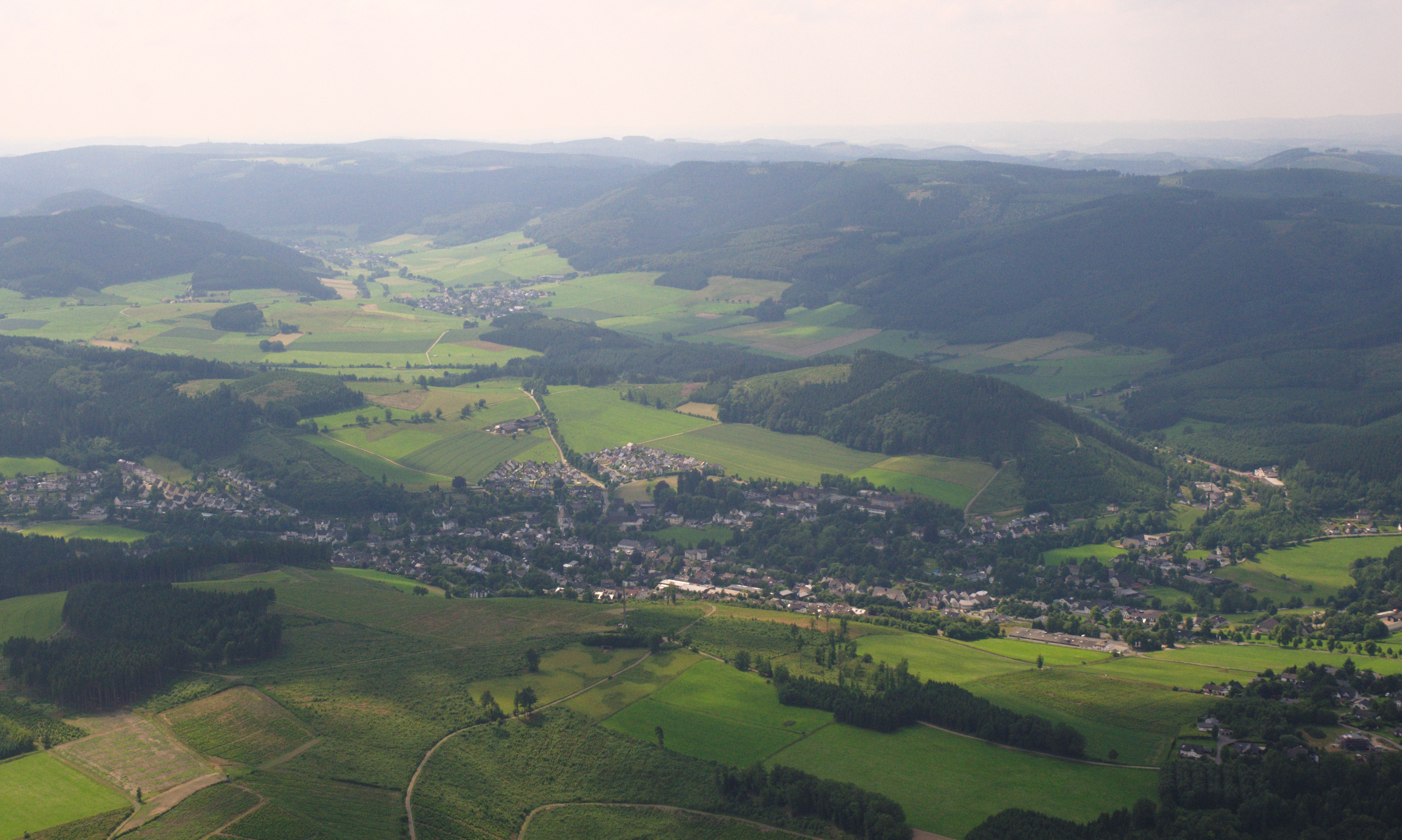
Eslohe

Eslohe is a municipality in the Hochsauerland district, in North Rhine-Westphalia, Germany.

== Geography ==
Eslohe is situated approximately 25 km south-west of Meschede.

=== Neighbouring municipalities ===
- Finnentrop
- Lennestadt
- Meschede
- Schmallenberg
- Sundern

=== Division of the town ===
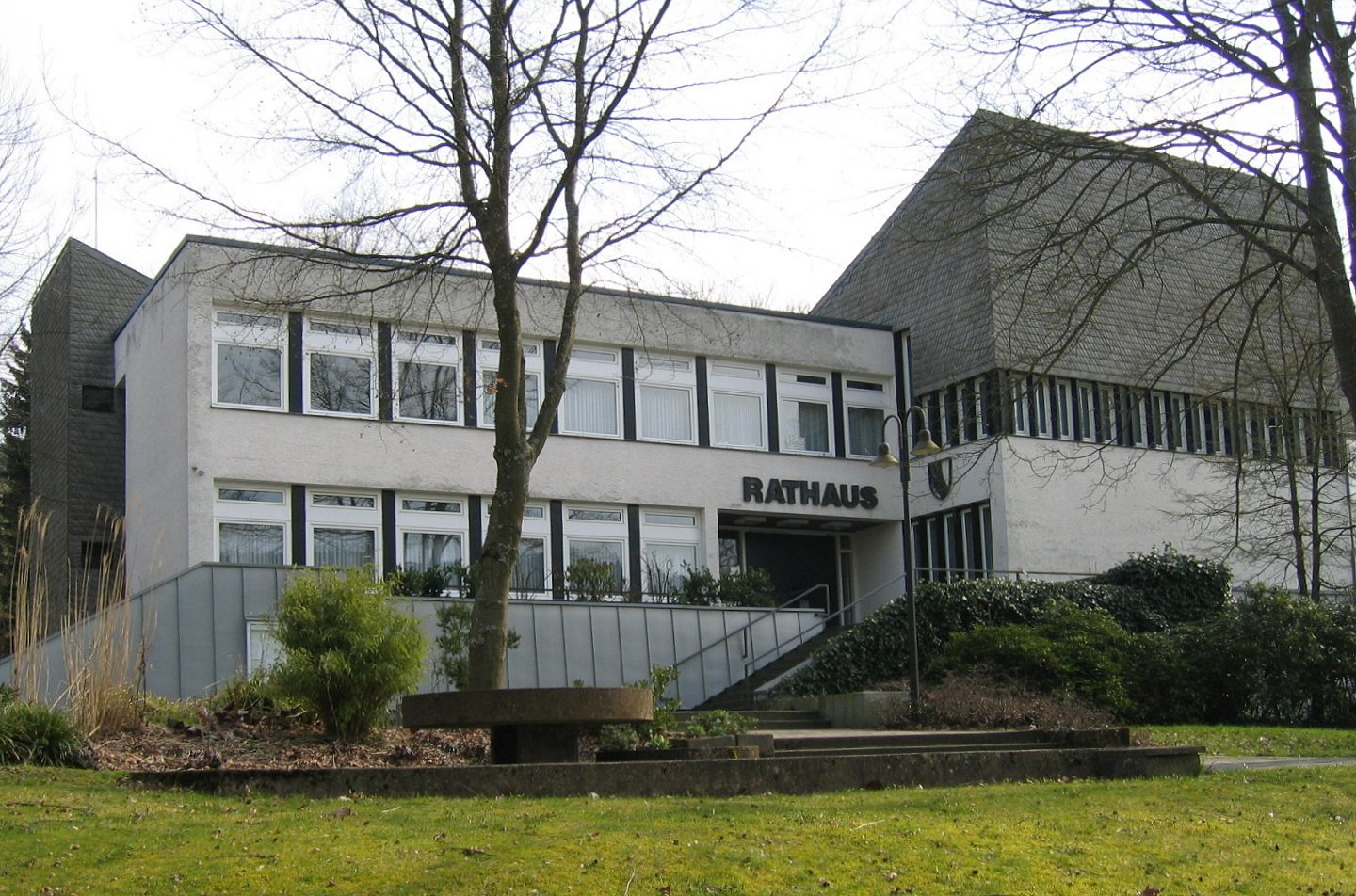
Eslohe Town hall (Rathaus)

After the local government reforms of 1975 Eslohe consists of the following districts:

- Beisinghausen
- Bockheim
- Bremke
- Bremscheid
- Büemke
- Büenfeld
- Cobbenrode
- Dormecke
- Einberg
- Eslohe
- Fredebeil
- Friedrichstal
- Frielinghausen
- Glamke
- Haus Blessenohl
- Haus Wenne
- Hengsbeck
- Hengslade
- Henninghausen
- Herhagen
- Herscheid
- Husen
- In der Marpe
- Isingheim
- Kückelheim
- Landenbeck
- Larmecke
- Leckmart
- Lochtrop
- Lohof
- Lüdingheim
- Nichtinghausen
- Nieder-Landenbeck
- Niedermarpe
- Niedersalwey
- Ober-Landenbeck
- Obermarpe
- Obersalwey
- Oesterberge
- Reiste
- Sallinghausen
- Schwartmecke
- Sieperting
- Stertberg
- Wenholthausen
- Wilhelmshöhe

== Population ==
Historical population

Year	Pop.	±% p.a.
1965	7,532	—
1970	8,013	+1.25%
1975	8,253	+0.59%
1980	8,192	−0.15%
1985	8,258	+0.16%
1990	8,862	+1.42%
1995	9,311	+0.99%

Year	Pop.	±% p.a.
2000	9,289	−0.05%
2005	9,253	−0.08%
2010	9,149	−0.23%
2015	8,942	−0.46%
2020	8,787	−0.35%
2025	8,587	−0.46%

Source: Landesdatabank Nordrhein-Westfalen

== Twin towns ==
- Kisbér (Hungary)

== Notable people ==
- Georg Milbradt (born 1945), politician (CDU)
- Carola Matthiesen (1943-2015), German University Teacher
