= Wenne =

River in Germany

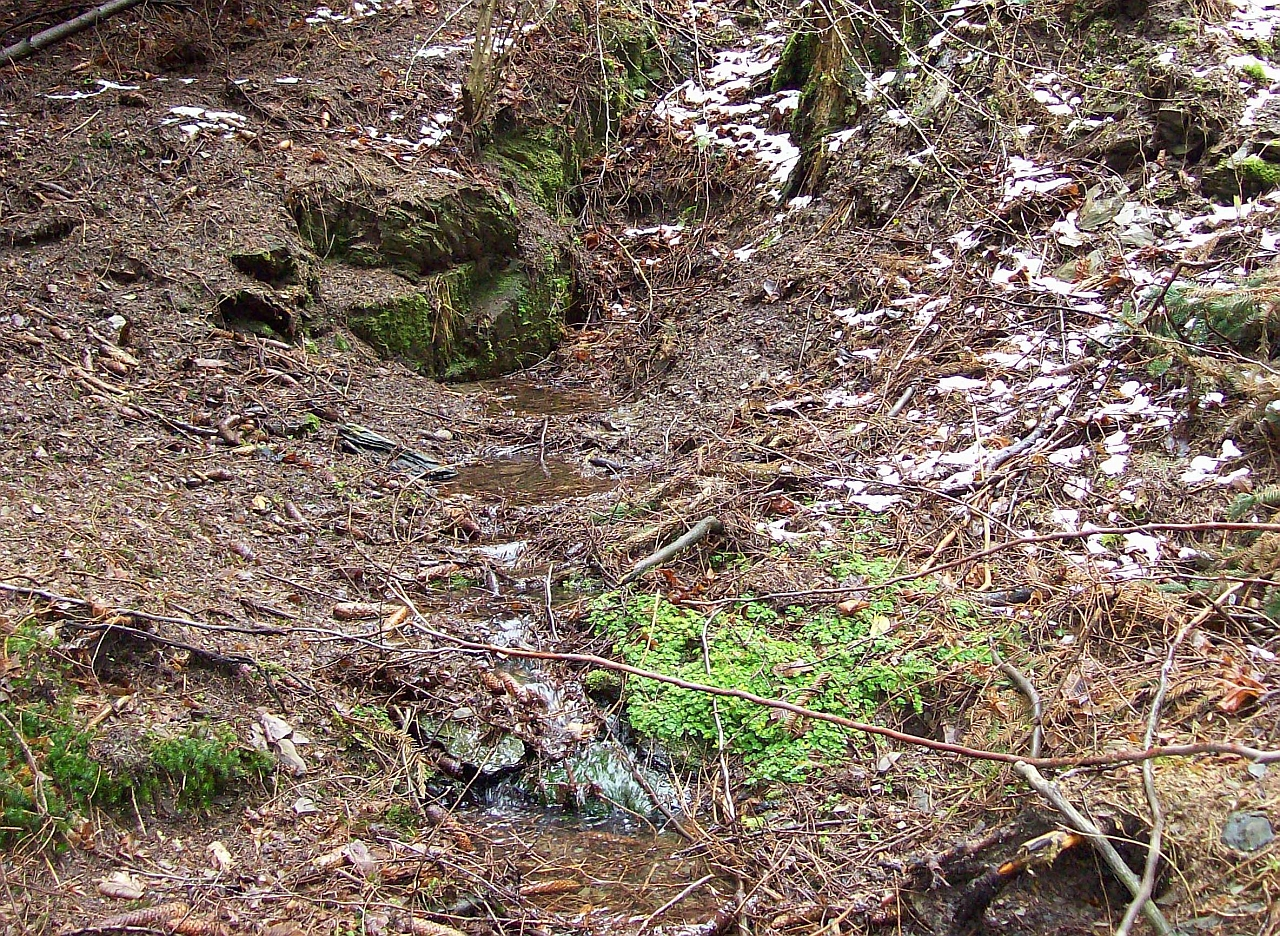
- Source of the Wenne at Schmallenberg-Obringhausen

Location
- Country: Germany
- State: North Rhine-Westphalia

Physical characteristics
- Mouth
  - location: Ruhr
  - coordinates: 51.3541°N 8.1783°E
- Length: 31.1 km (19.3 mi)
- Basin size: 219 km^{2} (85 sq mi)

Basin features
- Progression: Ruhr→ Rhine→ North Sea

Wenne is a river of North Rhine-Westphalia, Germany. The river springs in a forest area near Obringhausen.

It flows through the villages of Niederberndorf, Menkhausen, Grimminghausen (Schmallenberg), Lochtrop, Frielinghausen, Bremke, Wenholthausen and Berge before it flows into the Ruhr on the left at Wennemen at 234 m above sea level.

== Gallery ==
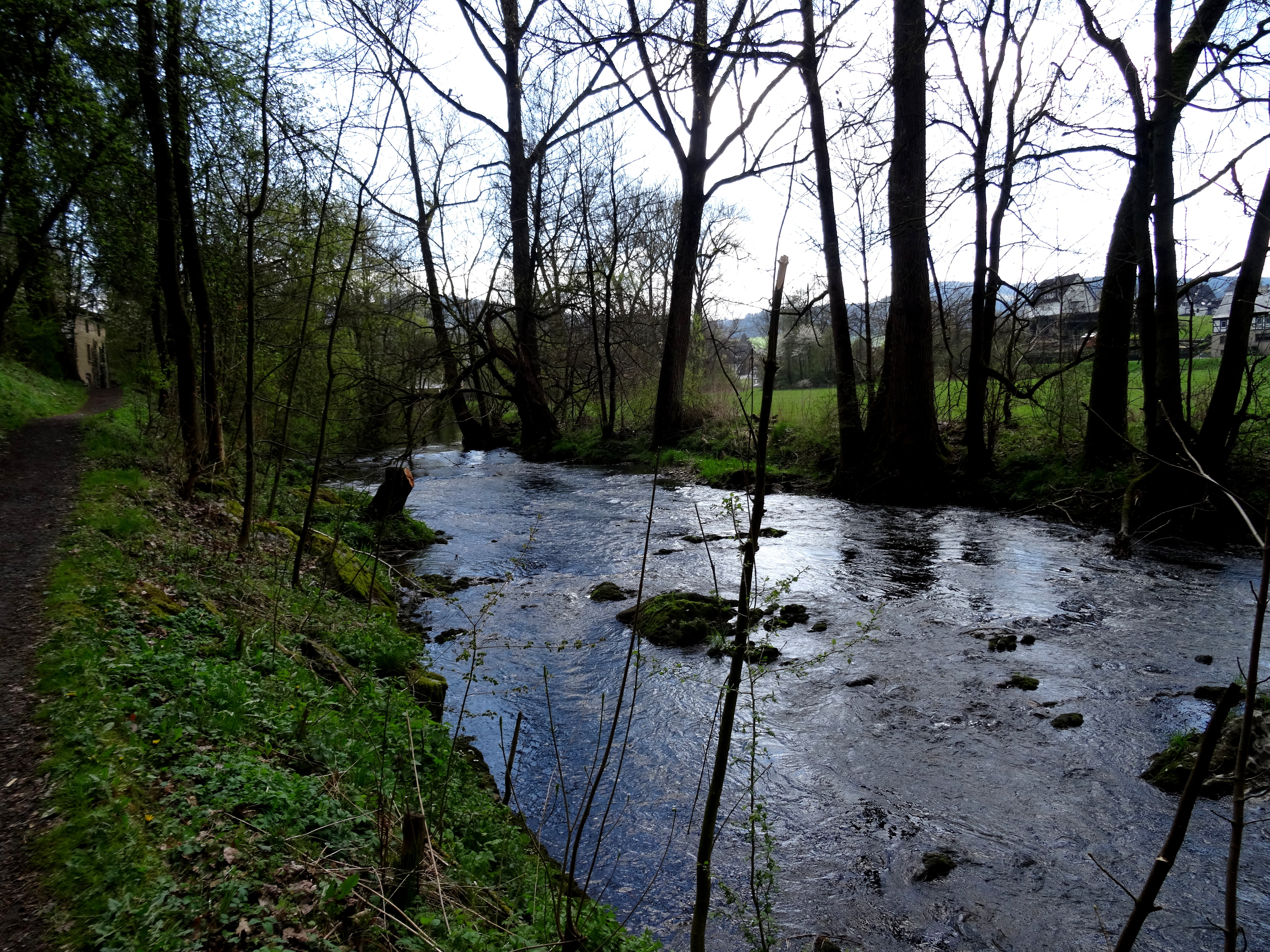
Wenne near Wenholthausen

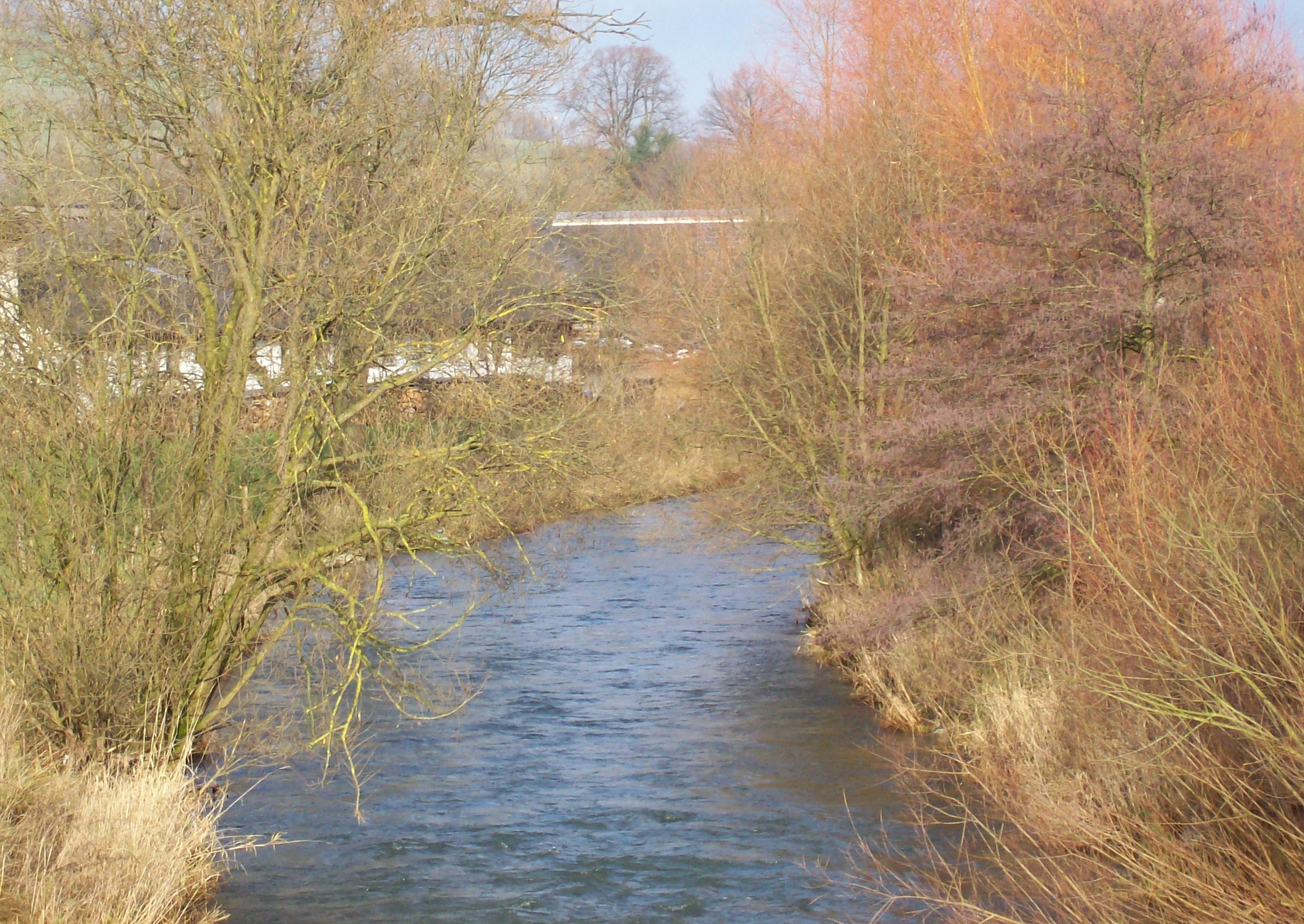
Wenne near Berge

== See also ==
- List of rivers of North Rhine-Westphalia
