= Harbecke =

- Stadtteil of Schmallenberg
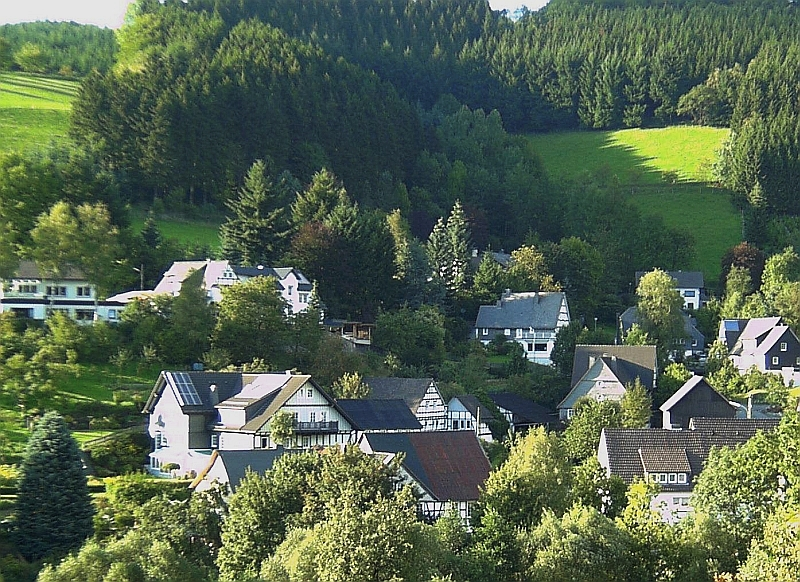
- Interactive map of Harbecke
- Location within Germany Location within North Rhine-Westphalia
- Coordinates: 51°8′47″N 8°14′0″E
- Country: Germany
- State: North Rhine-Westphalia
- Admin. region: Arnsberg
- District: Hochsauerlandkreis
- Town: Schmallenberg

Population (2021-12-31)
  - Total: 123
- Time zone: UTC+01:00 (CET)
  - Summer (DST): UTC+02:00 (CEST)

Harbecke is a locality in the municipality Schmallenberg in the district Hochsauerlandkreis in North Rhine-Westphalia, Germany.

The village has 123 inhabitants and lies in the west of the municipality of Schmallenberg at a height of around 395 m on the Kreisstraße 25. The river Harbecke flows through the village.

Harbecke borders on the villages of Felbecke, Fleckenberg, Lenne, Selkentrop, Werpe and Werntrop. "Hartbeke" was first mentioned in 1361 in a document from Grafschaft Abbey. The village used to belong to the municipality of Wormbach in Amt Schmallenberg until the end of 1974.

== Gallery ==
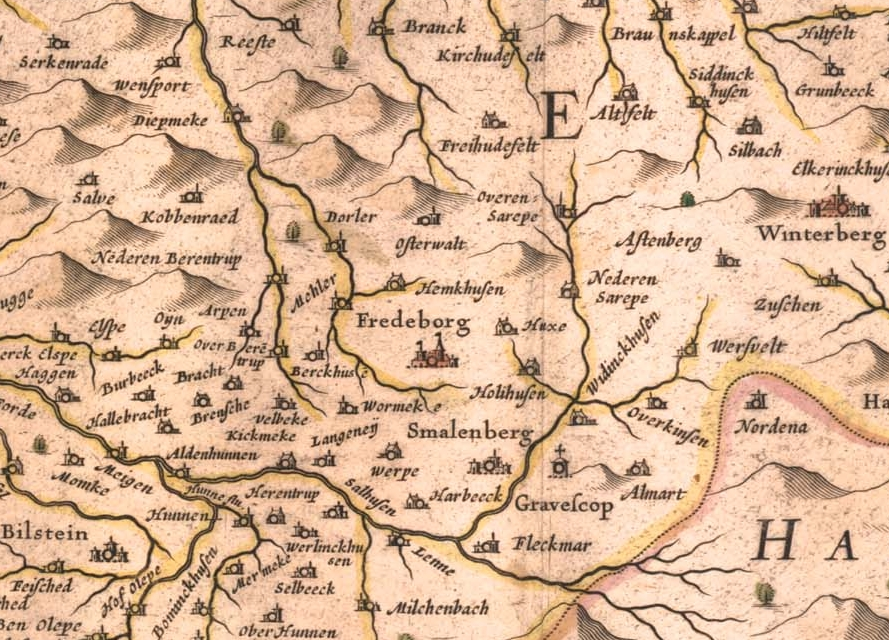
„Harbeeck“ 1645 - Westphalia Ducatus (Duchy of Westphalia)

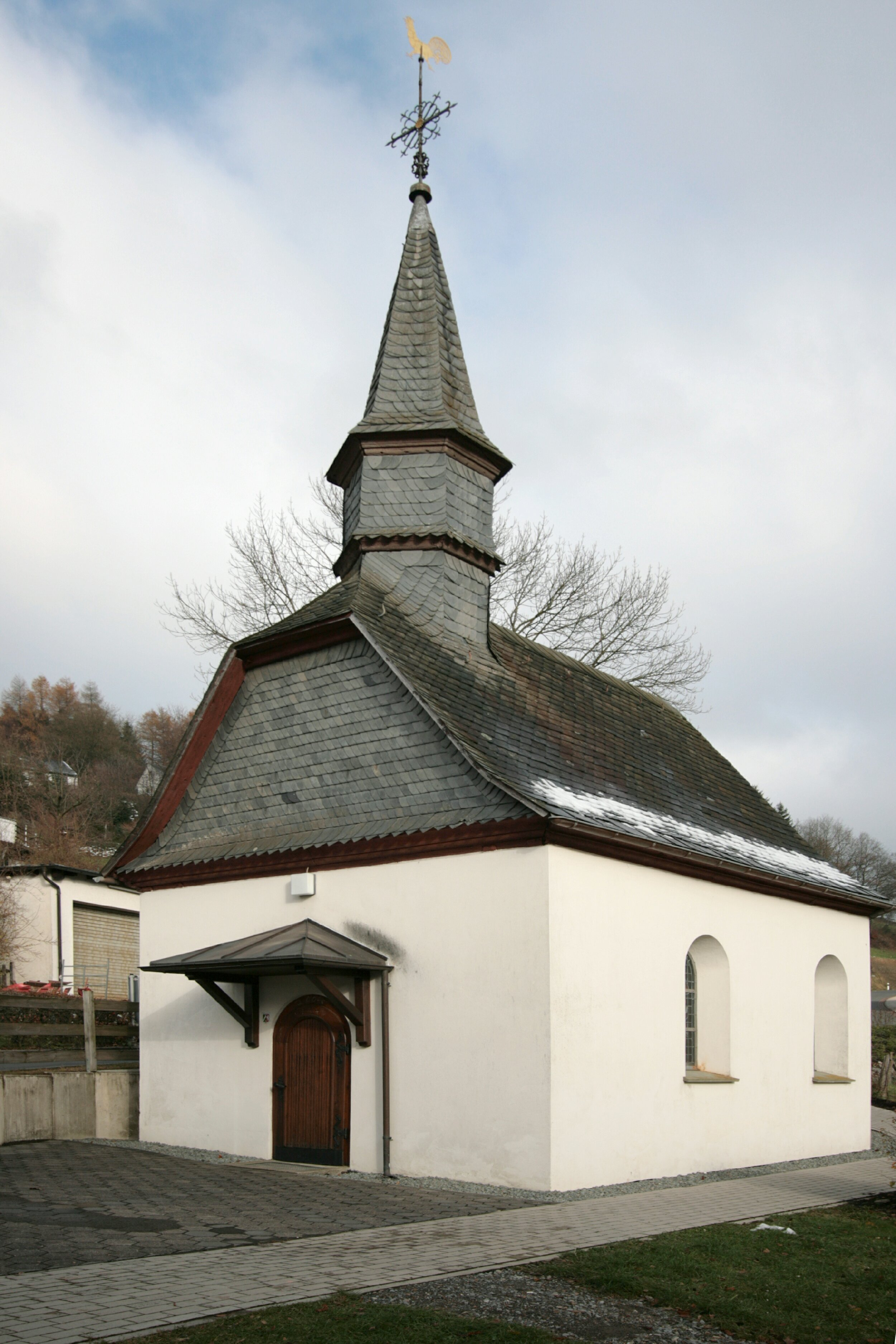
St. Barbara Chapel (Anno 1757) in Harbecke
