= Lenne (Schmallenberg) =

- Stadtteil of Schmallenberg
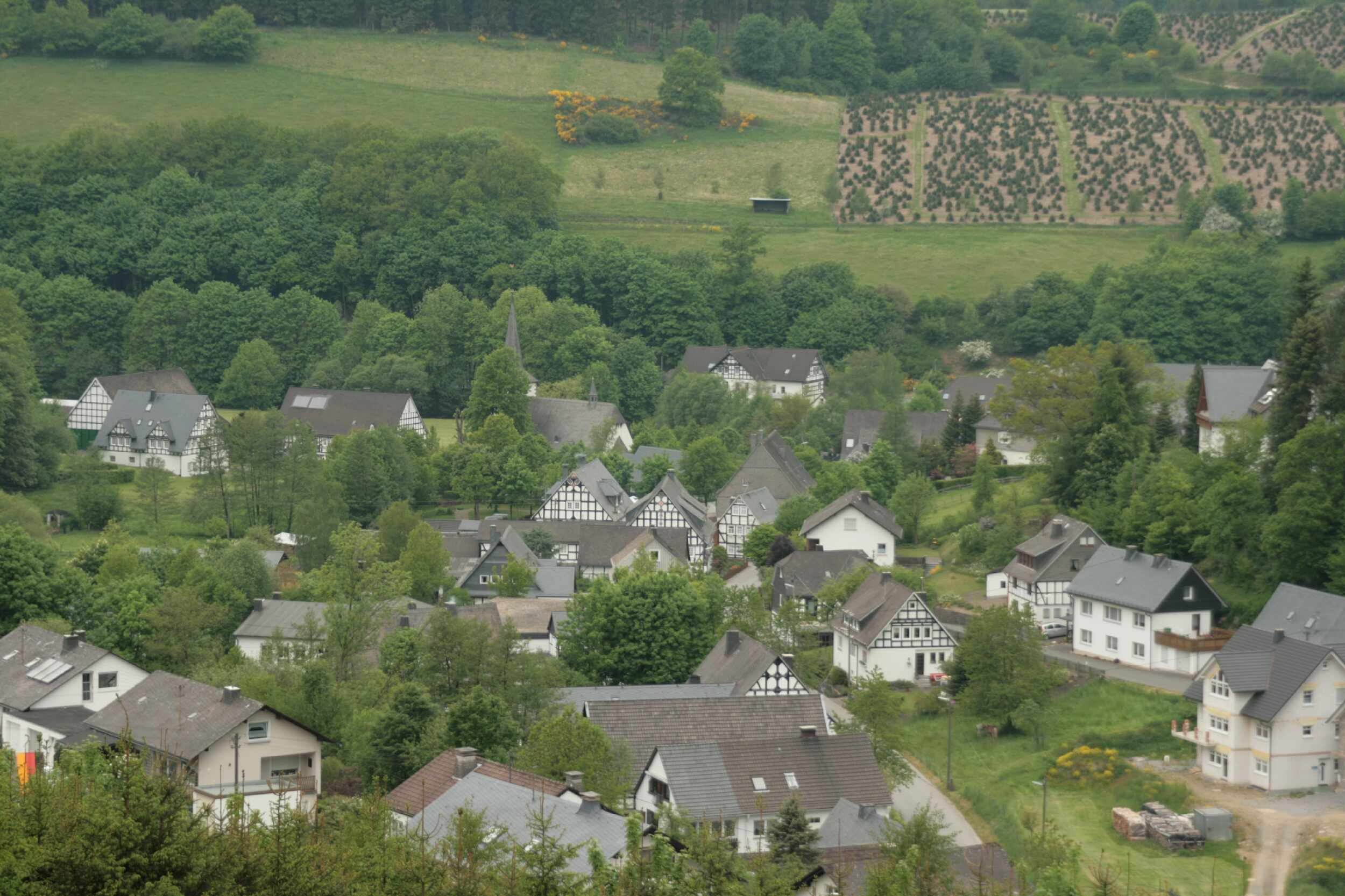
- Interactive map of Lenne
- Location within Germany Location within North Rhine-Westphalia
- Coordinates: 51°7′57″N 8°13′17″E
- Country: Germany
- State: North Rhine-Westphalia
- Admin. region: Arnsberg
- District: Hochsauerlandkreis
- Town: Schmallenberg

Population (2021-12-31)
  - Total: 371
- Time zone: UTC+01:00 (CET)
  - Summer (DST): UTC+02:00 (CEST)

Lenne (German pronunciation: [ˈlɛnə]) is a locality in the municipality Schmallenberg in the High Sauerland District in North Rhine-Westphalia, Germany.

The village has 371 inhabitants and lies in the west of the municipality of Schmallenberg at a height of around 350 m. Through the village leads the Bundesstraße 236. In the village flows the stream Uentrop coming from the Uentroptal in the river Lenne. Lenne borders on the villages of Fleckenberg, Wulwesort, Hundesossen, Milchenbach and Harbecke.

The first written document mentioning Leno dates from 1072 in a charter from Grafschaft Abbey of bishop Anno of Cologne. The village used to belong to the municipality of Lenne in Amt Schmallenberg until the end of 1974.

== Gallery ==
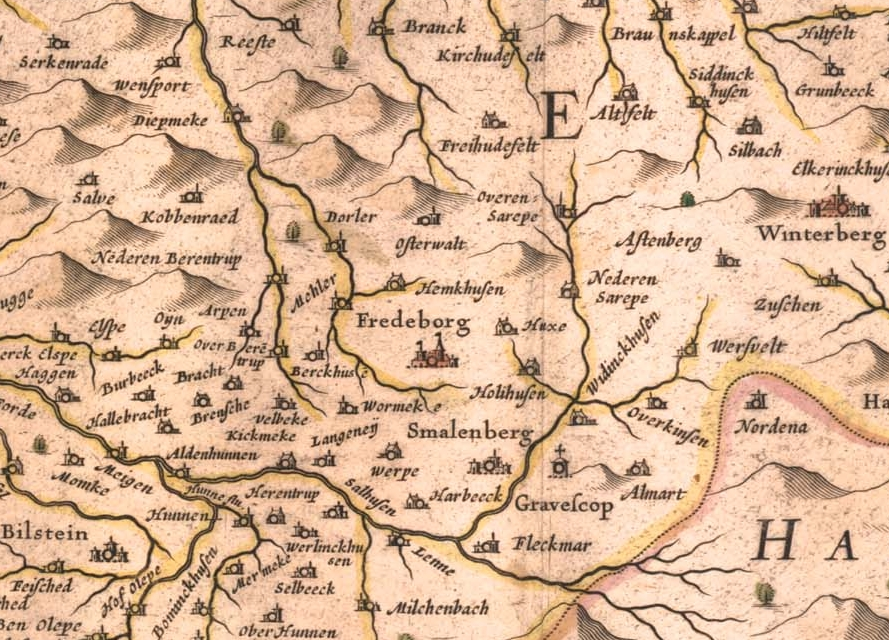
„Lenne“ 1645 - Westphalia Ducatus (Duchy of Westphalia)

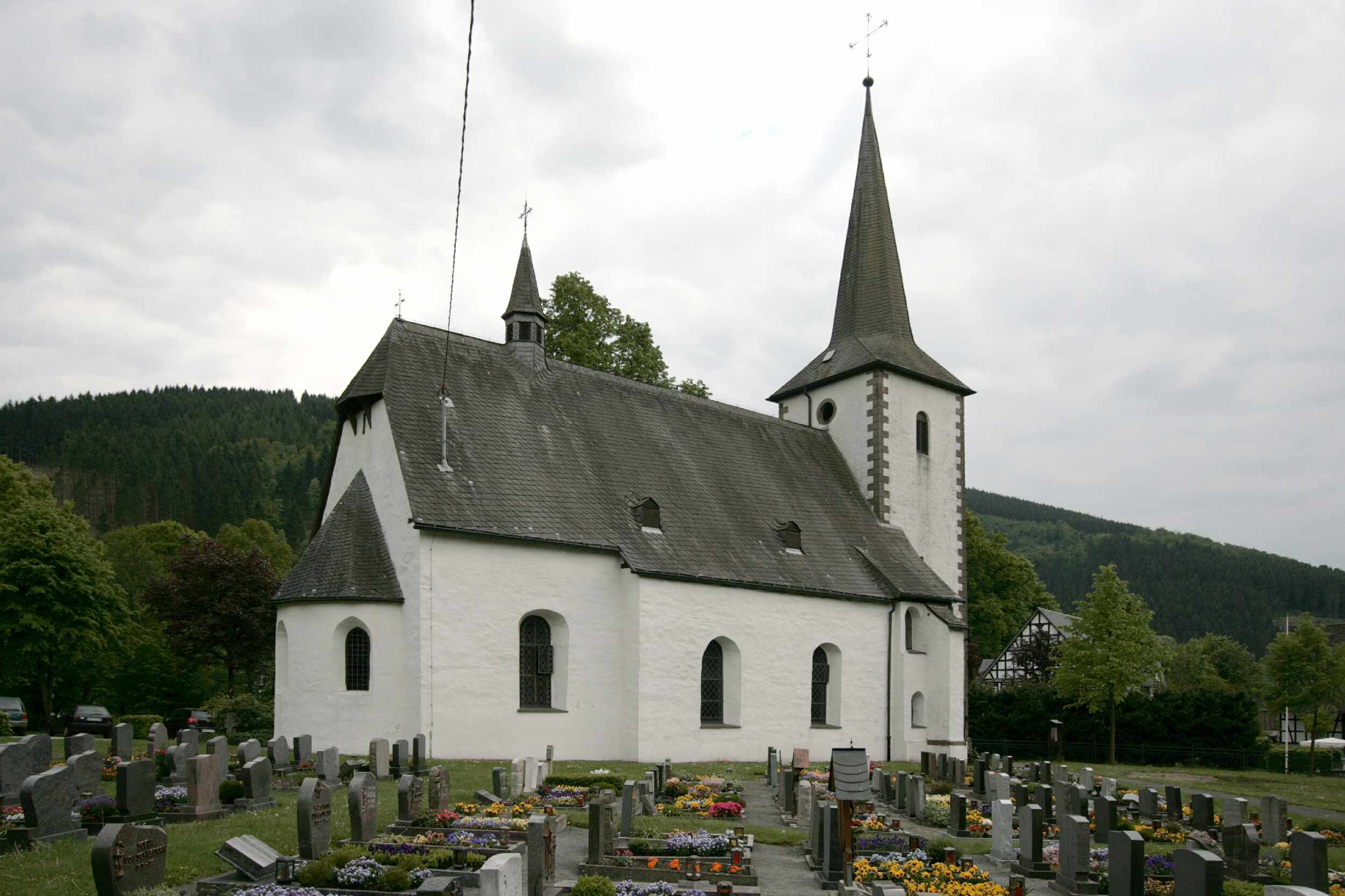
St. Vinzentius Church
