= Bracht (Schmallenberg) =

- Stadtteil of Schmallenberg
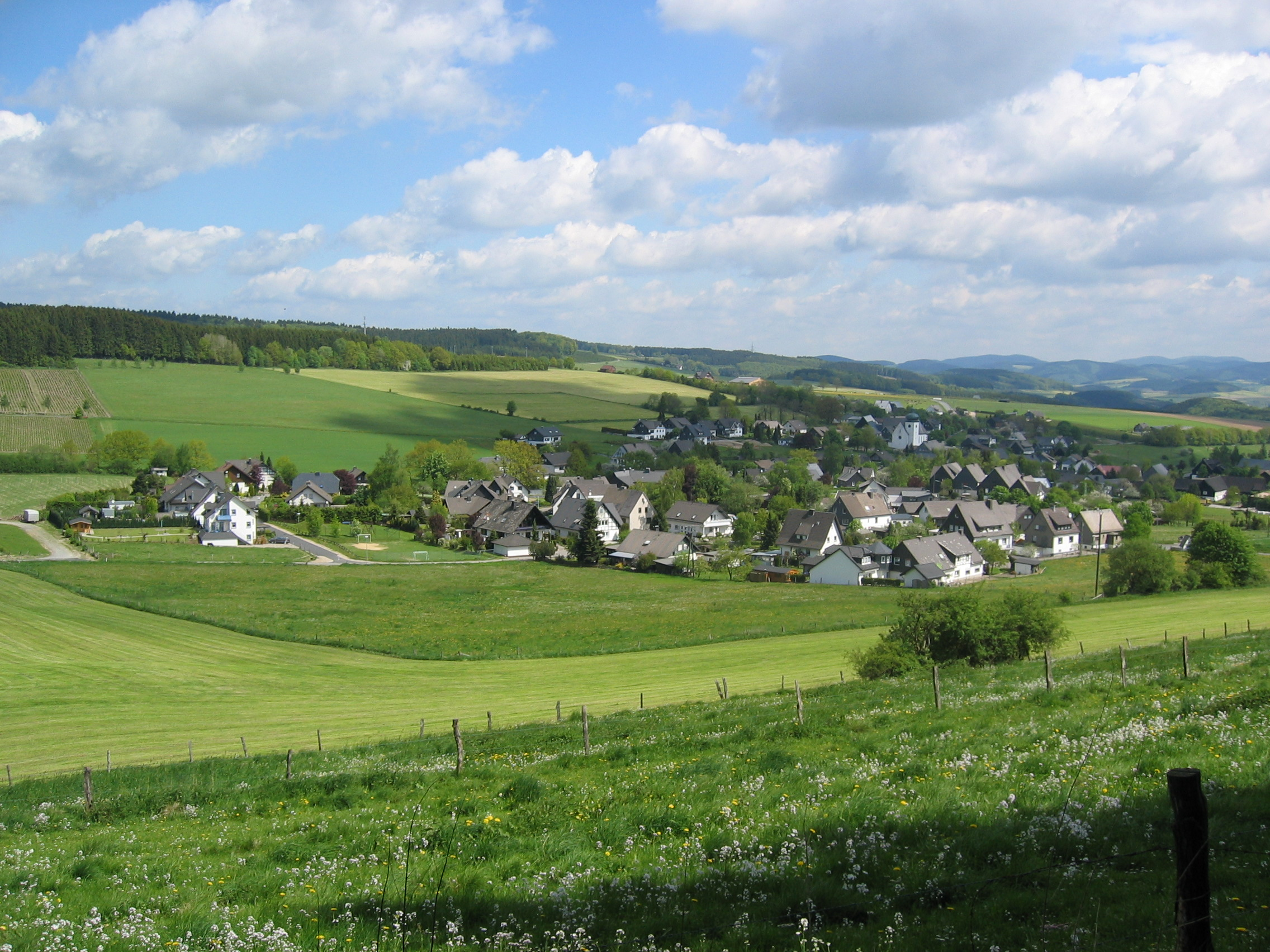
- Interactive map of Bracht
- Location within Germany Location within North Rhine-Westphalia
- Coordinates: 51°9′57″N 8°9′54″E
- Country: Germany
- State: North Rhine-Westphalia
- Admin. region: Arnsberg
- District: Hochsauerlandkreis
- Town: Schmallenberg

Population (2021-12-31)
  - Total: 453
- Time zone: UTC+01:00 (CET)
  - Summer (DST): UTC+02:00 (CEST)

Bracht is a locality in the municipality Schmallenberg in the High Sauerland District in North Rhine-Westphalia, Germany.

The village has 453 inhabitants and lies in the west of the municipality of Schmallenberg at a height of around 464 m. In the village centre the Landstraße 928 meets the Landstraße 737. Bracht borders on the villages of Werntrop, Kückelheim, Rotbusch, Hebbecke and Brenschede.

The village used to belong to the municipality of Wormbach in Amt Schmallenberg until the end of 1974.

== Gallery ==
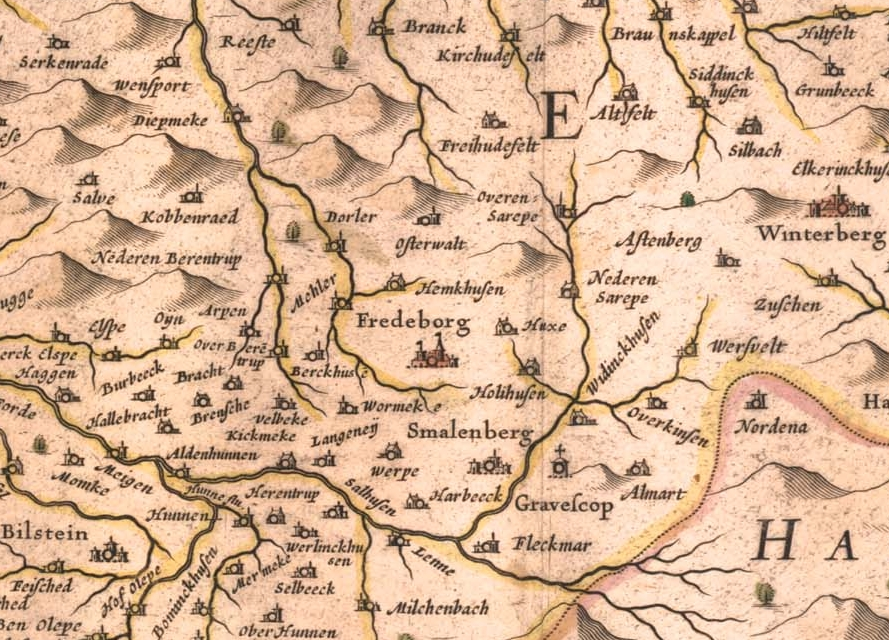
„Bracht“ 1645 - Westphalia Ducatus (Duchy of Westphalia)

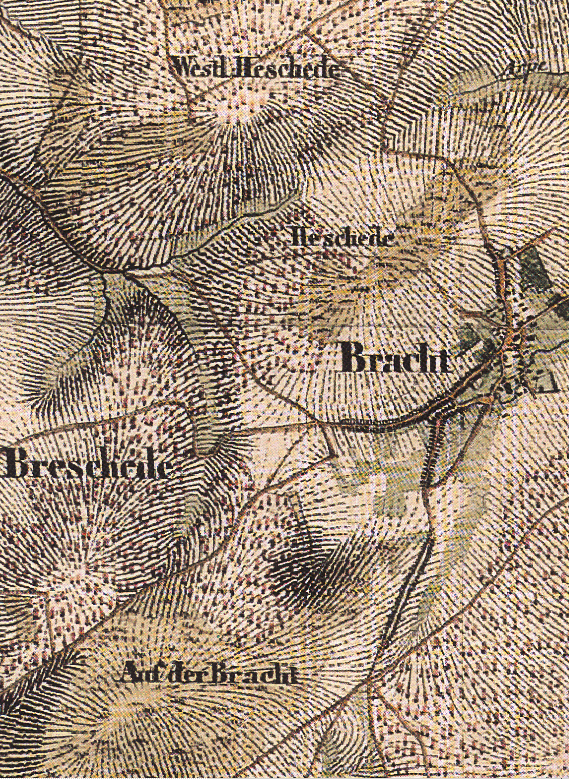
Bracht, preußische Uraufnahme 1841

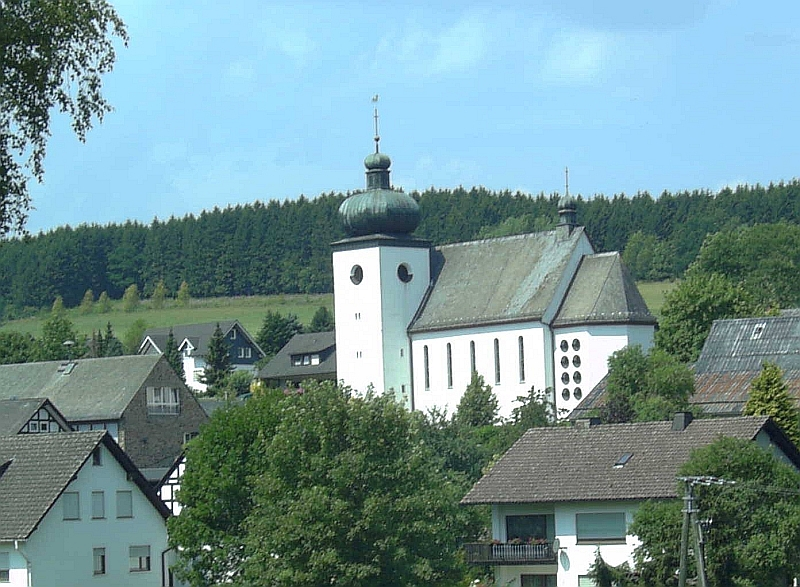
St. Marien Church, Bracht
