= Rehsiepen (Schmallenberg) =

- Stadtteil of Schmallenberg
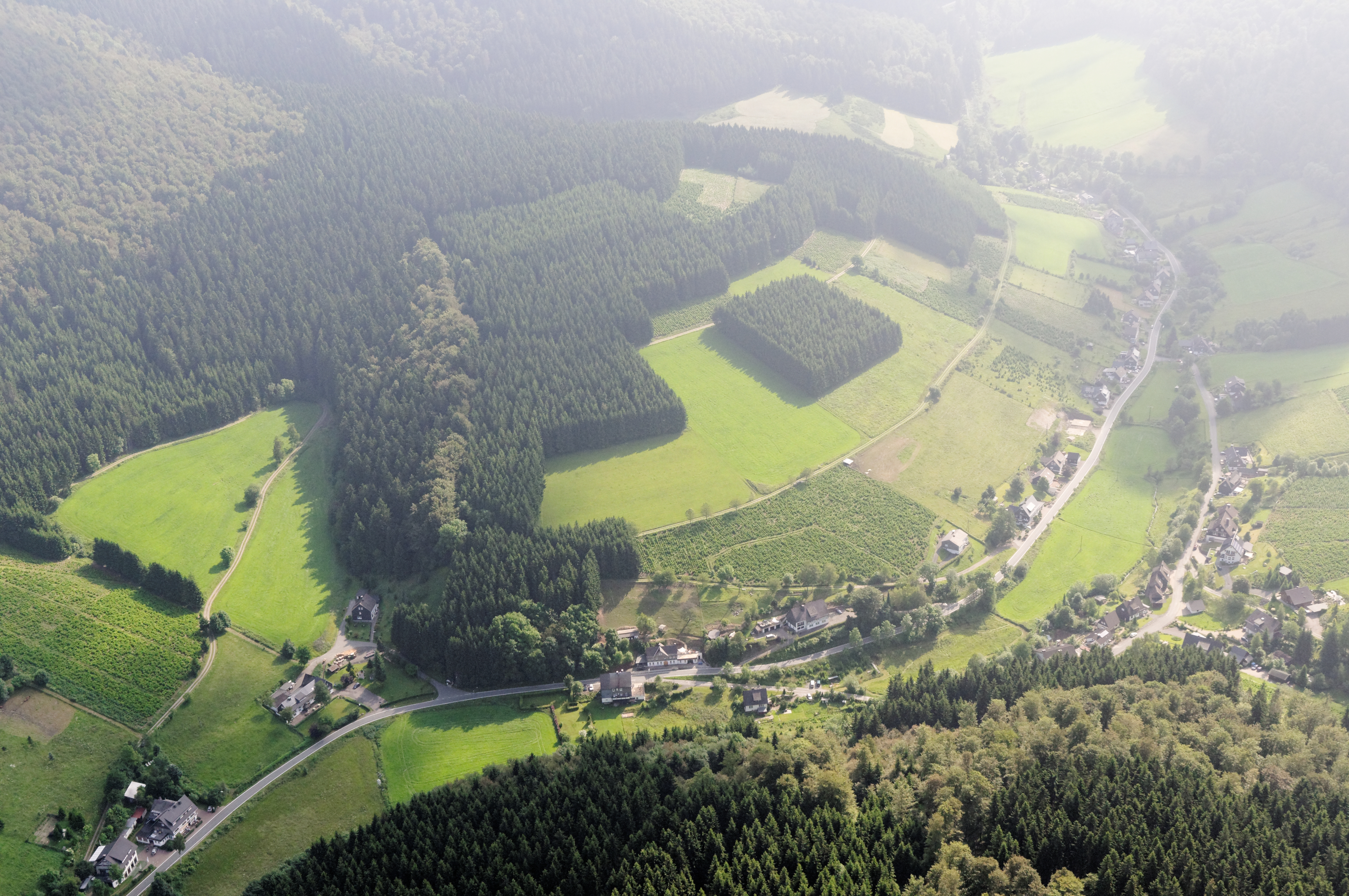
- Interactive map of Rehsiepen
- Location within Germany Location within North Rhine-Westphalia
- Coordinates: 51°11′46″N 8°24′47″E
- Country: Germany
- State: North Rhine-Westphalia
- Admin. region: Arnsberg
- District: Hochsauerlandkreis
- Town: Schmallenberg

Population (2021-12-31)
  - Total: 113
- Time zone: UTC+01:00 (CET)
  - Summer (DST): UTC+02:00 (CEST)

Rehsiepen is a locality in the municipality Schmallenberg in the High Sauerland District in North Rhine-Westphalia, Germany.

The village has 113 inhabitants and lies in the east of the municipality of Schmallenberg at a height of around 556 m on the Landstraße 742. The river Sorpe flows through the village. Rehsiepen borders on the villages of Obersorpe, Altastenberg and Nesselbach.

Rehsiepen was first mentioned around 1600 as name in the statistics of the village Oberkirchen. The village used to belong to the municipality of Oberkirchen in Amt Schmallenberg until the end of 1974.

== Gallery ==
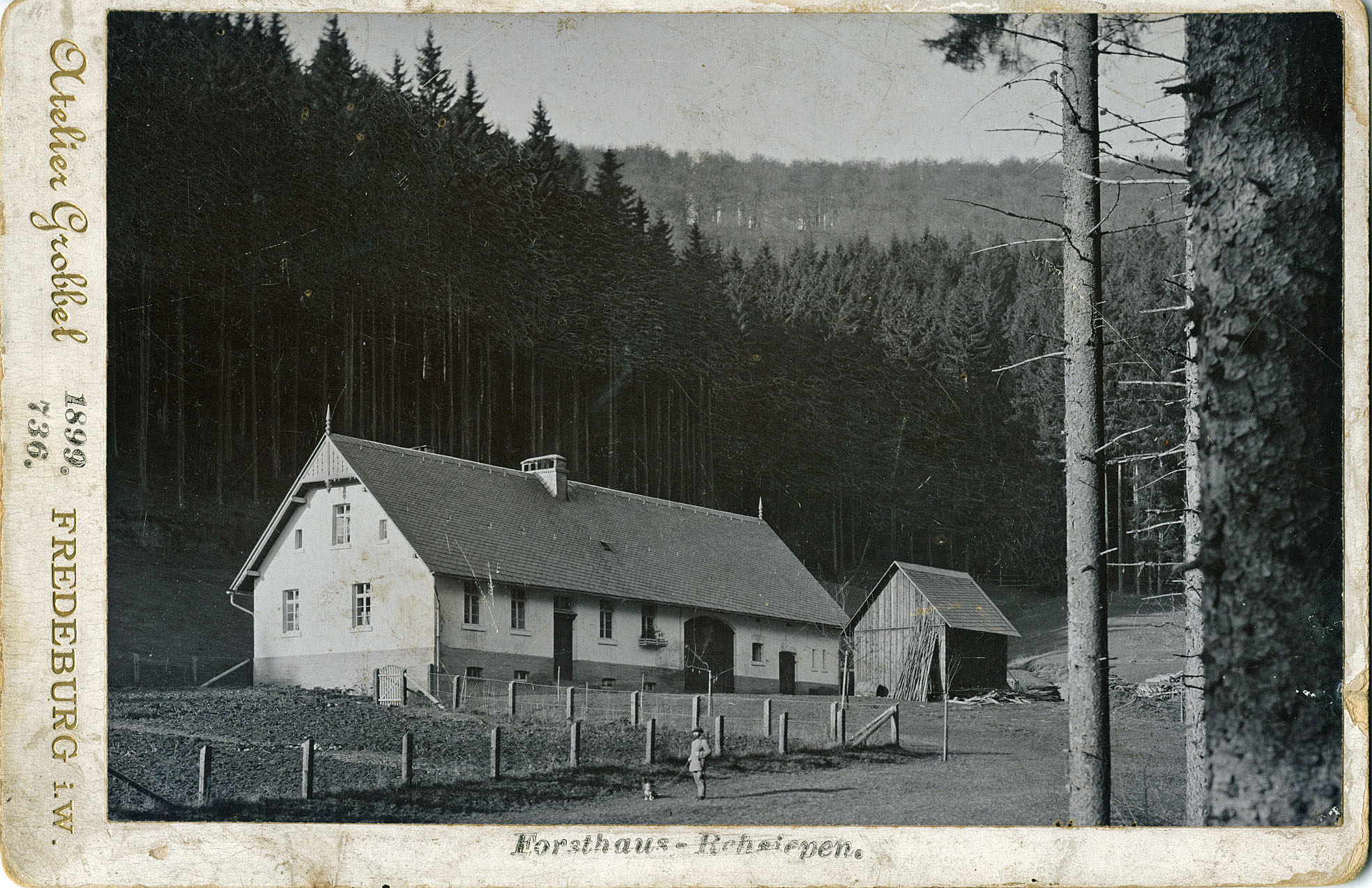
Old forester's lodge, 1899

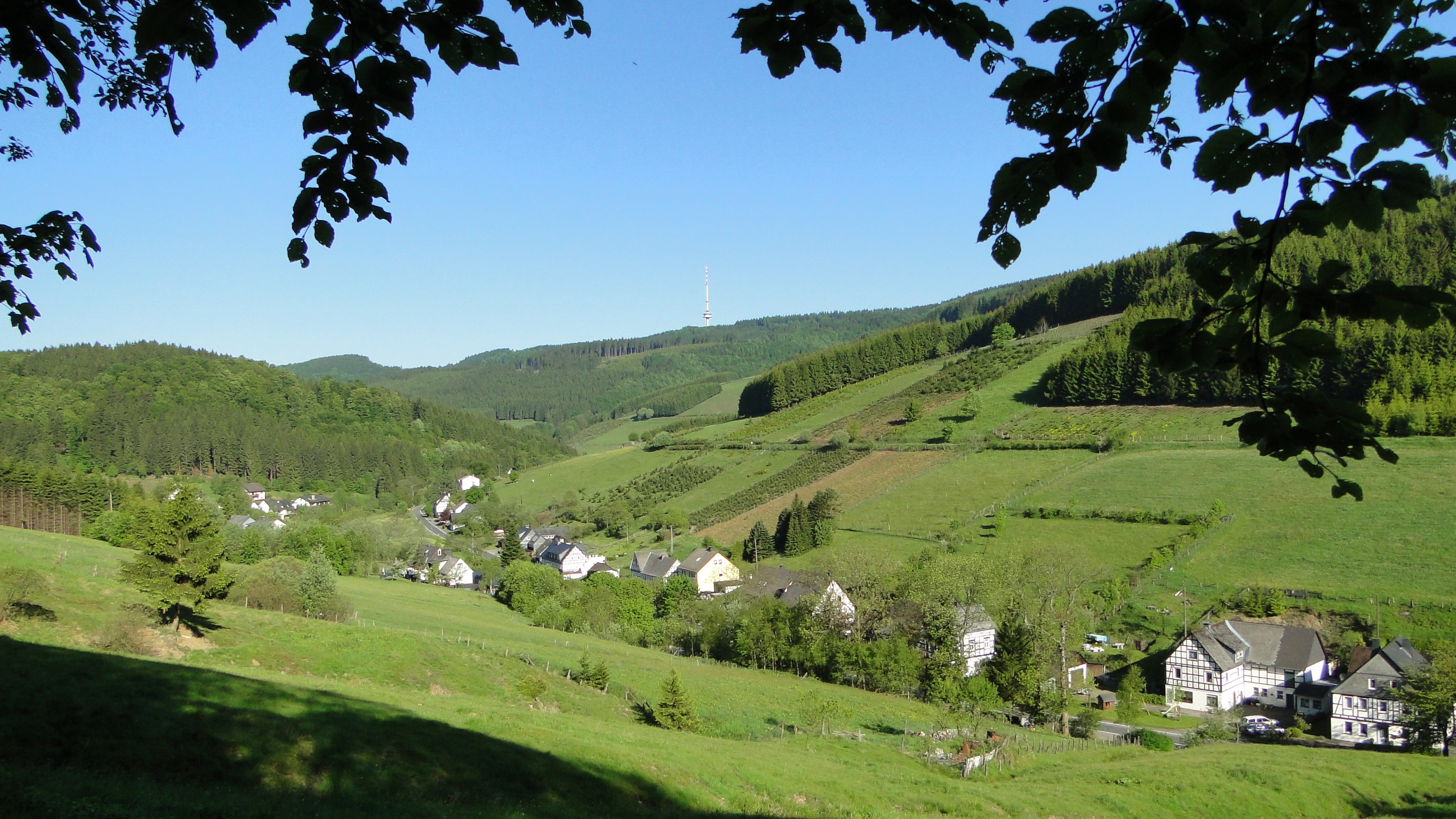
Rehsiepen, winter side

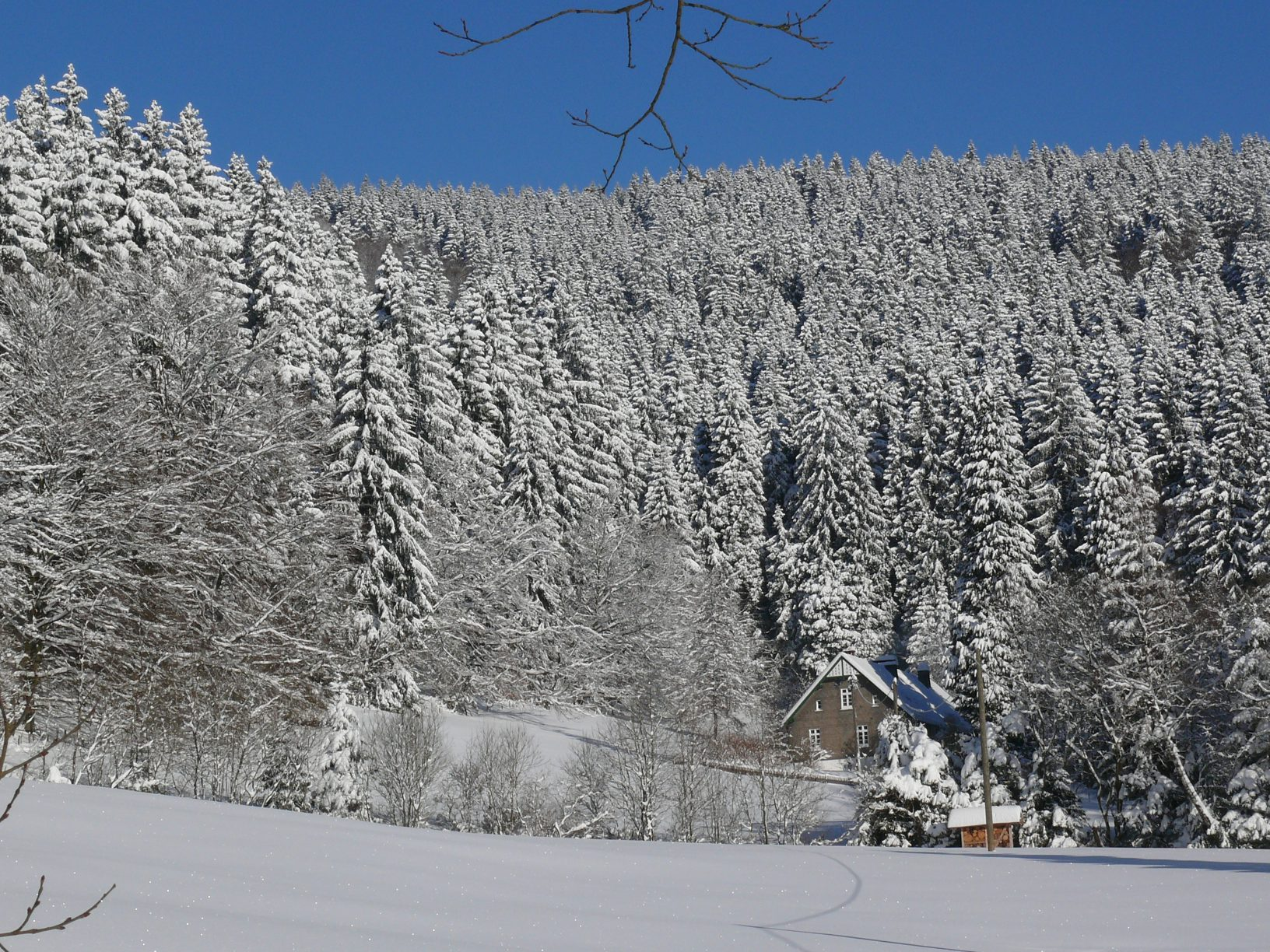
Rehsiepen, winter 2009
