= Kirchilpe =

- Stadtteil of Schmallenberg
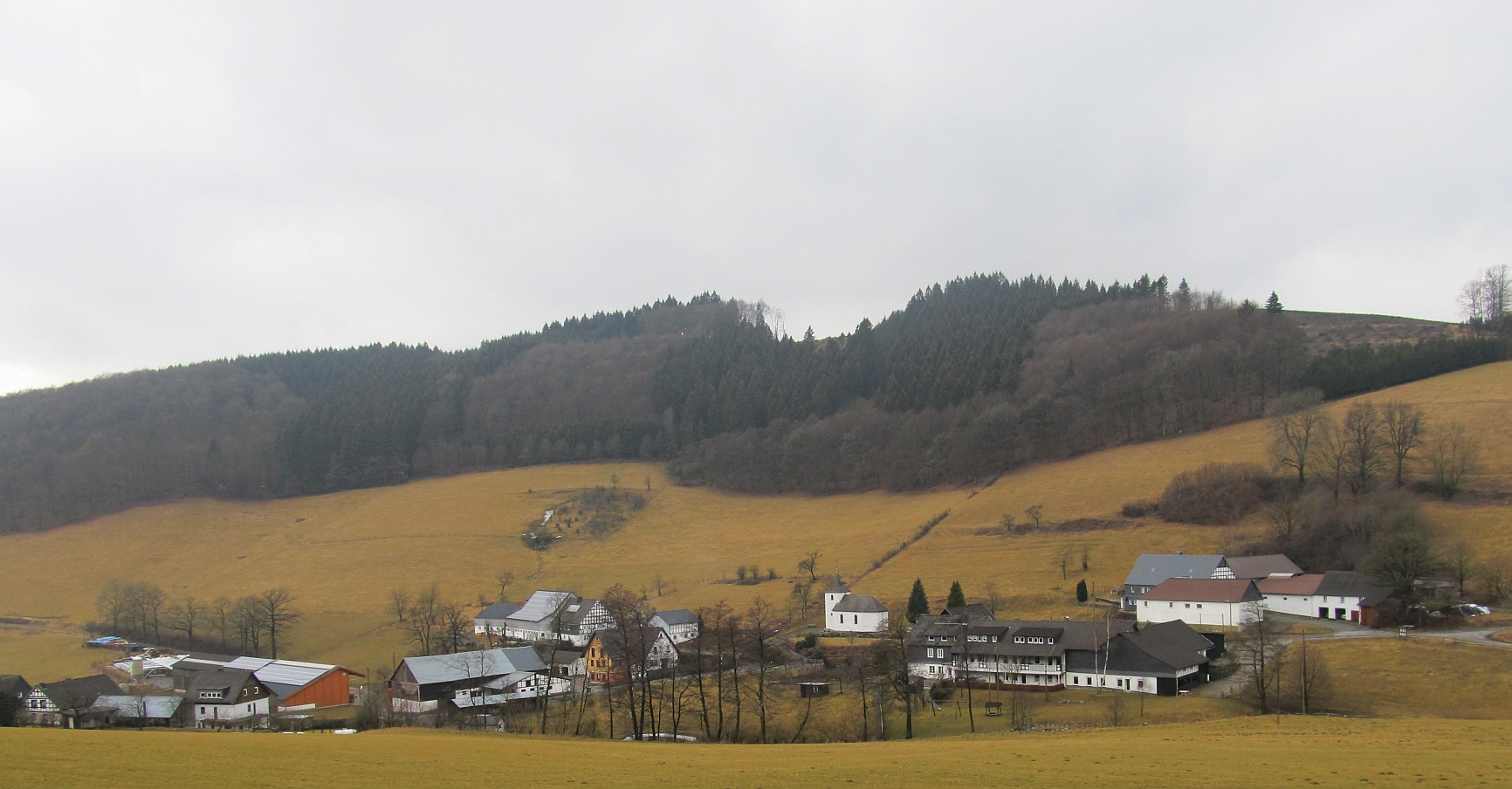
- Interactive map of Kirchilpe
- Location within Germany Location within North Rhine-Westphalia
- Coordinates: 51°14′26″N 8°15′13″E
- Country: Germany
- State: North Rhine-Westphalia
- Admin. region: Arnsberg
- District: Hochsauerlandkreis
- Town: Schmallenberg

Population (2021-12-31)
  - Total: 33
- Time zone: UTC+01:00 (CET)
  - Summer (DST): UTC+02:00 (CEST)

Kirchilpe is a locality in the municipality Schmallenberg in the district Hochsauerlandkreis in North Rhine-Westphalia, Germany.

The village has 33 inhabitants and lies in the north of the municipality of Schmallenberg at a height of around 400 m. Kirchilpe borders on the villages of Dorlar, Twismecke, Beisinghausen, Landenbeck and Nierentrop. The village used to belong to the municipality of Dorlar in Amt Schmallenberg until the end of 1974.

== Gallery ==
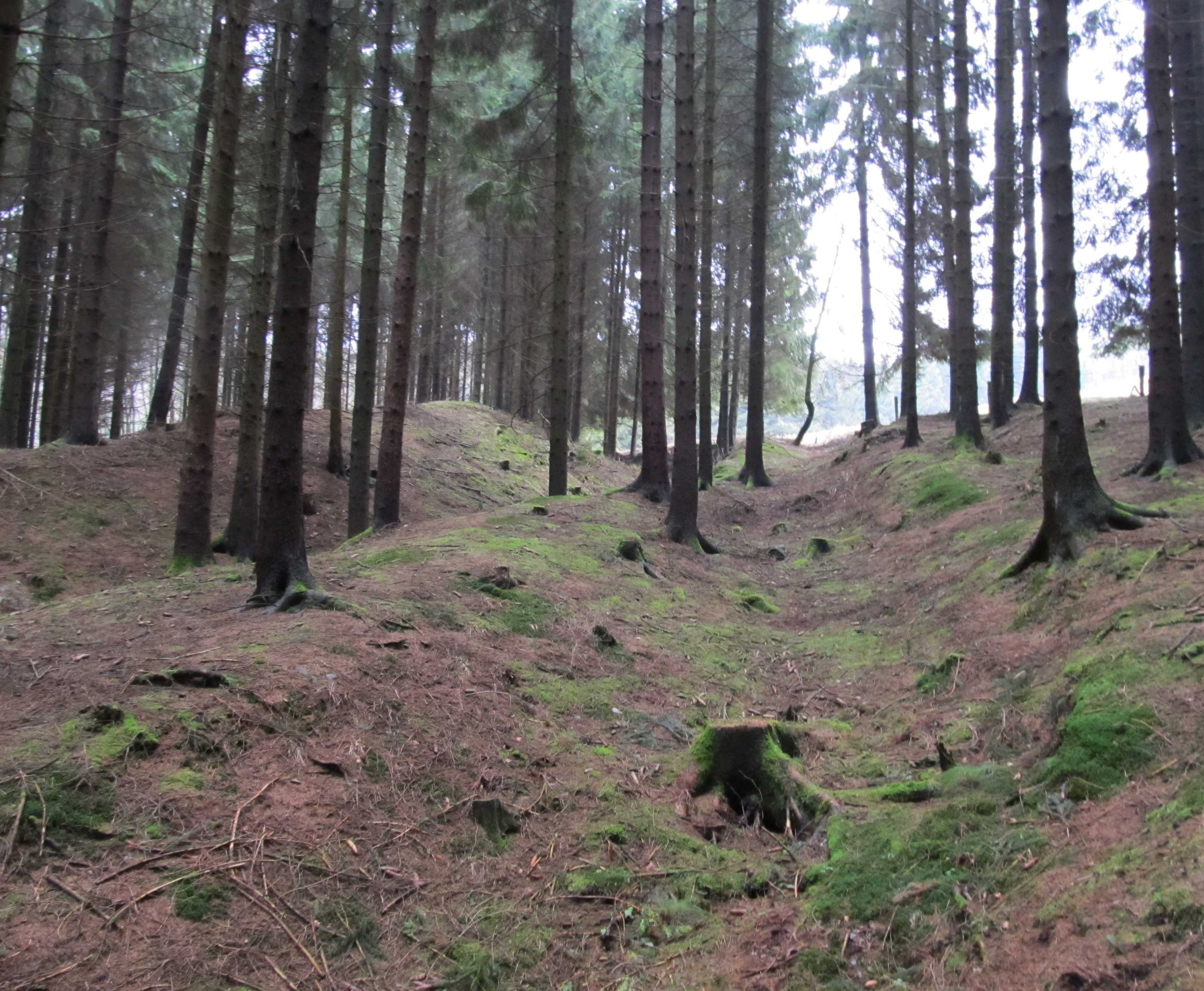
Wallburg Kirchilpe, Liudolfinger or Carolingian dynasty

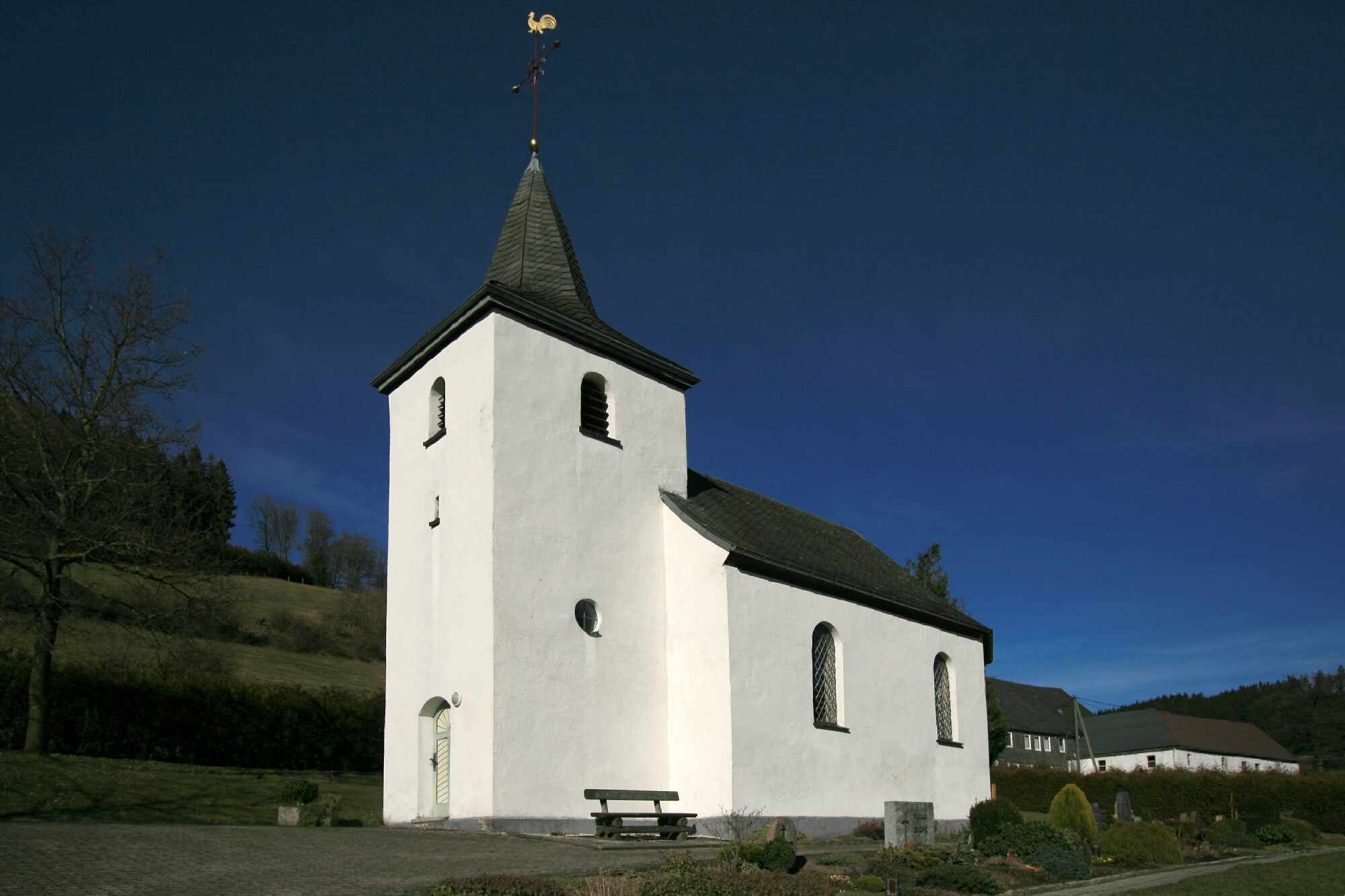
St. Cyriakus Chapel, 1858
