= Rotbusch =

- Stadtteil of Schmallenberg
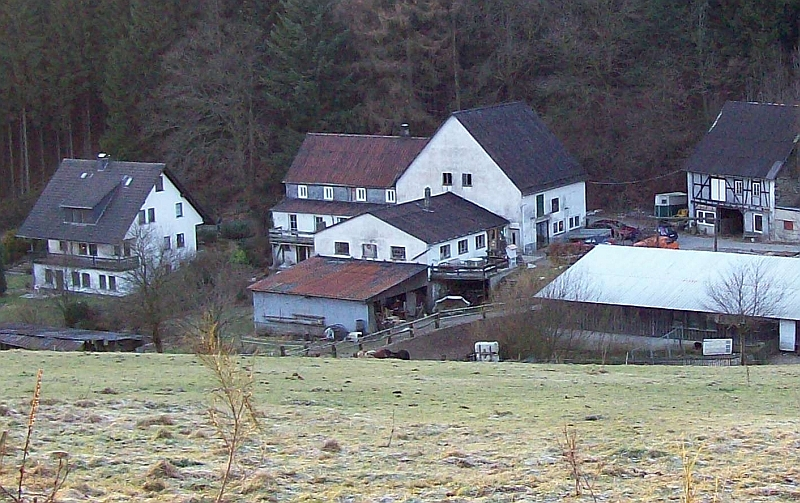
- Interactive map of Rotbusch
- Location within Germany Location within North Rhine-Westphalia
- Coordinates: 51°09′13″N 8°08′25″E
- Country: Germany
- State: North Rhine-Westphalia
- Admin. region: Arnsberg
- District: Hochsauerlandkreis
- Town: Schmallenberg

Population (2021-12-31)
  - Total: 2
- Time zone: UTC+01:00 (CET)
  - Summer (DST): UTC+02:00 (CEST)

Rotbusch is a locality in the municipality Schmallenberg in the district Hochsauerlandkreis in North Rhine-Westphalia, Germany.

The hamlet has 2 inhabitants and lies in the west of the municipality of Schmallenberg at a height of around 510 m. Rotbusch borders on the villages of Brenschede, Bracht, Hebbecke and Gleierbrück.
