= Werpe =

- Stadtteil of Schmallenberg
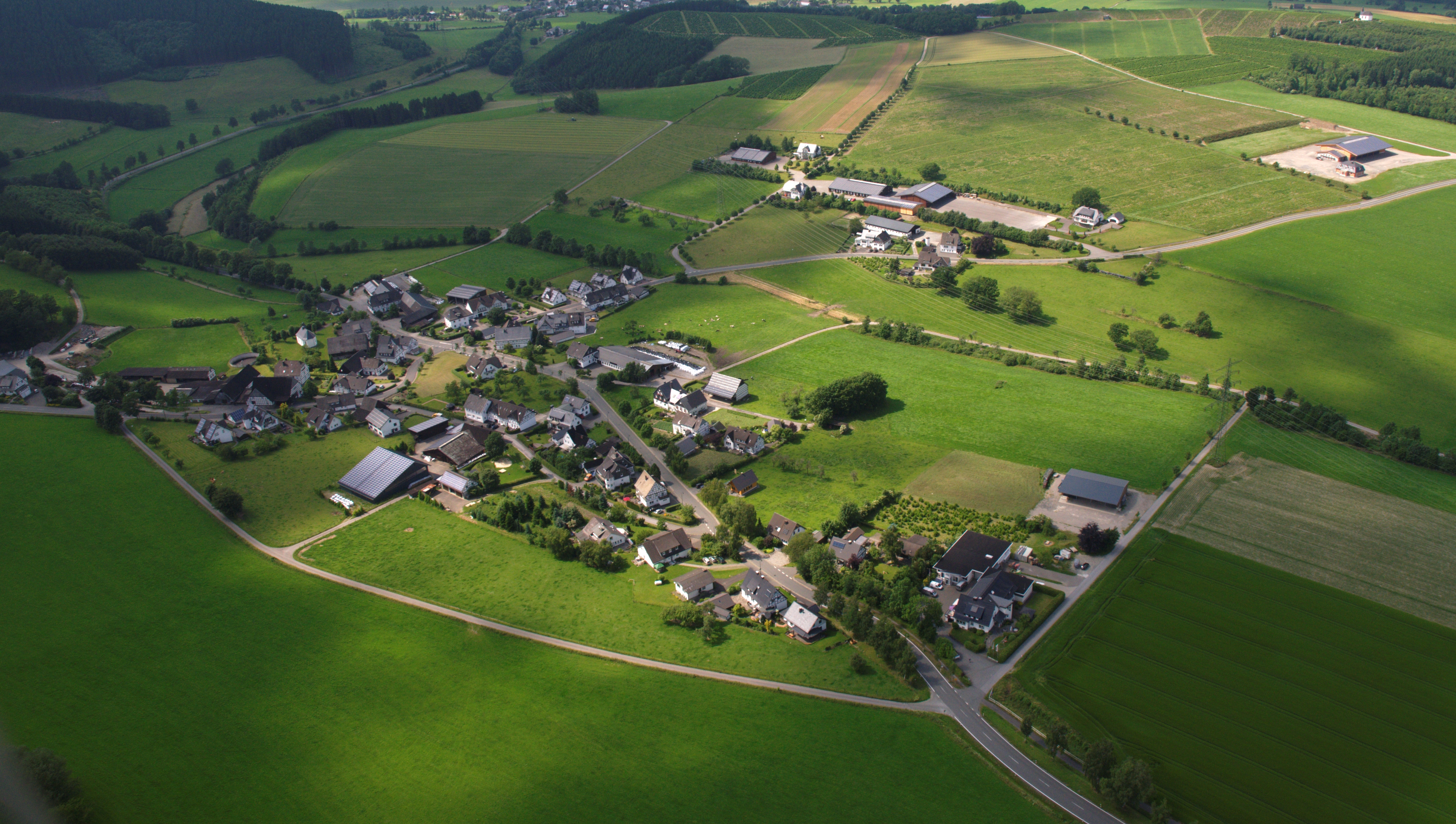
- Interactive map of Werpe
- Location within Germany Location within North Rhine-Westphalia
- Coordinates: 51°9′20″N 8°15′4″E
- Country: Germany
- State: North Rhine-Westphalia
- Admin. region: Arnsberg
- District: Hochsauerlandkreis
- Town: Schmallenberg

Population (2021-12-31)
  - Total: 203
- Time zone: UTC+01:00 (CET)
  - Summer (DST): UTC+02:00 (CEST)

Werpe is a locality in the municipality Schmallenberg in the district Hochsauerlandkreis in North Rhine-Westphalia, Germany.

The Werpe has 203 inhabitants and lies in the west of the municipality of Schmallenberg at a height of around 430 m. The river Wehrsiepen flows through the village.

Werpe borders on the villages of Harbecke, Felbecke, Wormbach, Schmallenberg and Fleckenberg. Schmallenberg's aerodrome (Motorsport- und Segelflugplatz Rennefeld) is between the villages of Werpe and Wormbach. In the village centre the Landesstraße 737 meets the Kreisstraße 25.

Werpe was first mentioned in 1221 in a document. The village used to belong to the municipality of Wormbach in Amt Schmallenberg until the end of 1974.

== Gallery ==
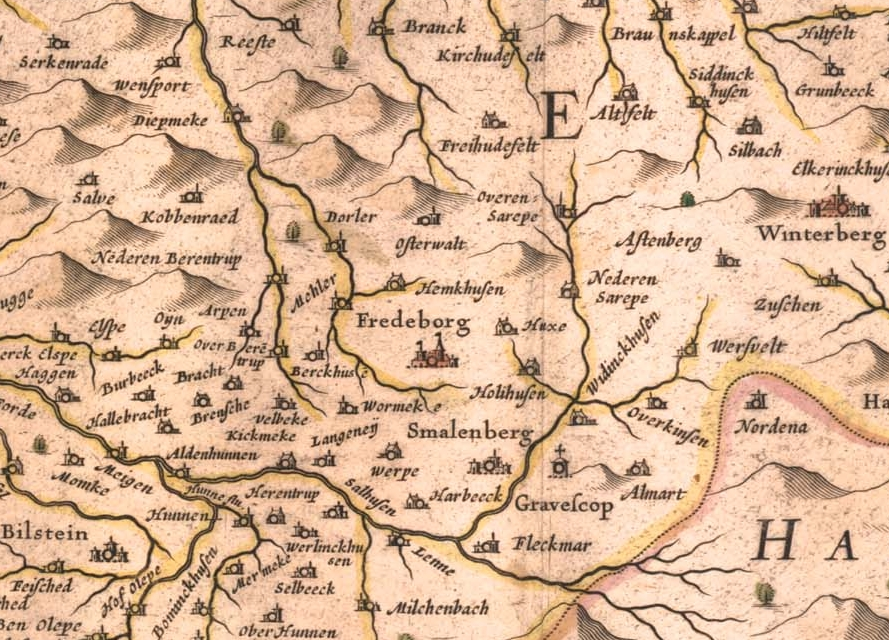
„Werpe“ 1645 - Westphalia Ducatus (Duchy of Westphalia)

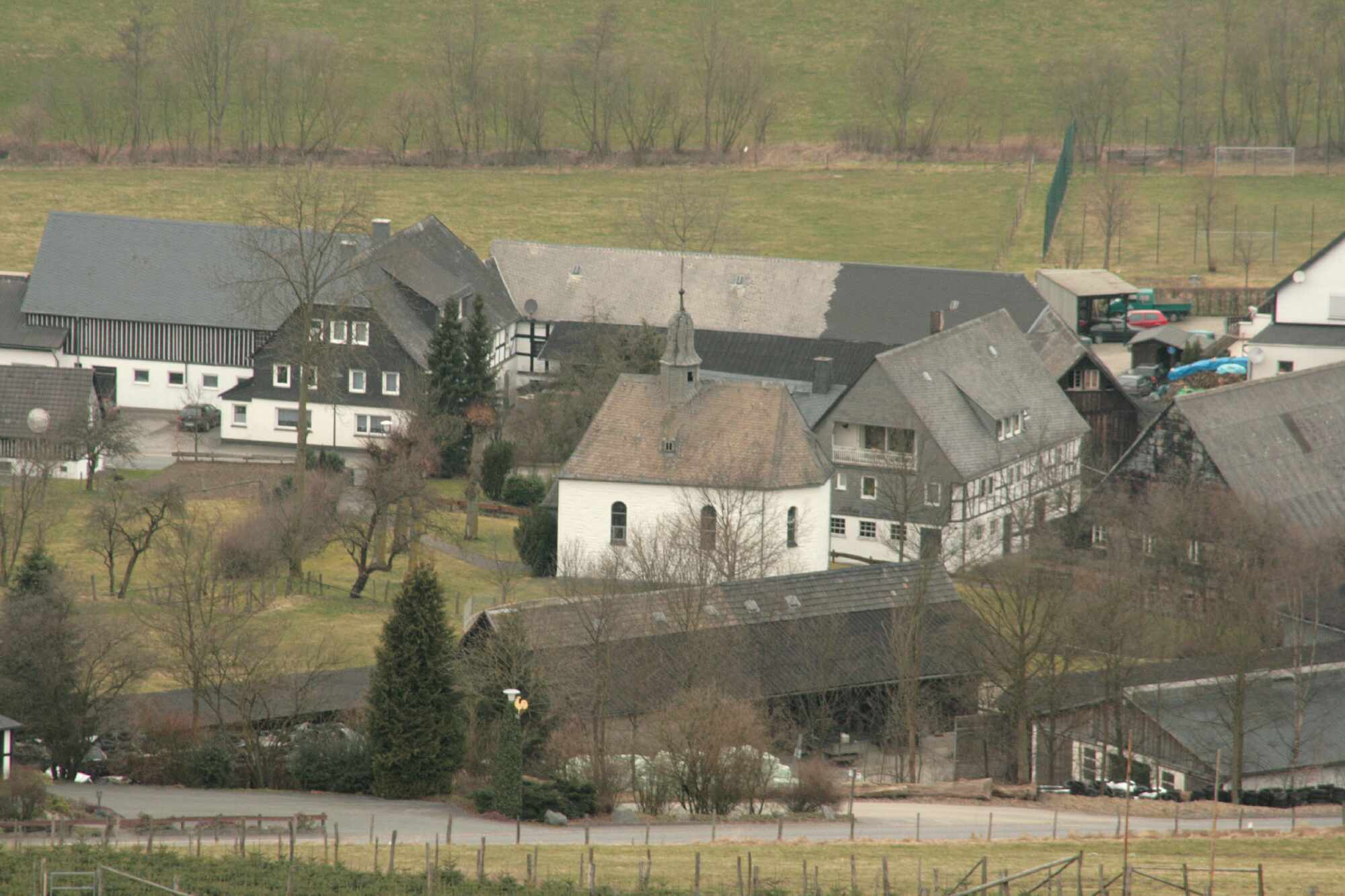
Chapel in Werpe
