= Wormbach =

- Stadtteil of Schmallenberg
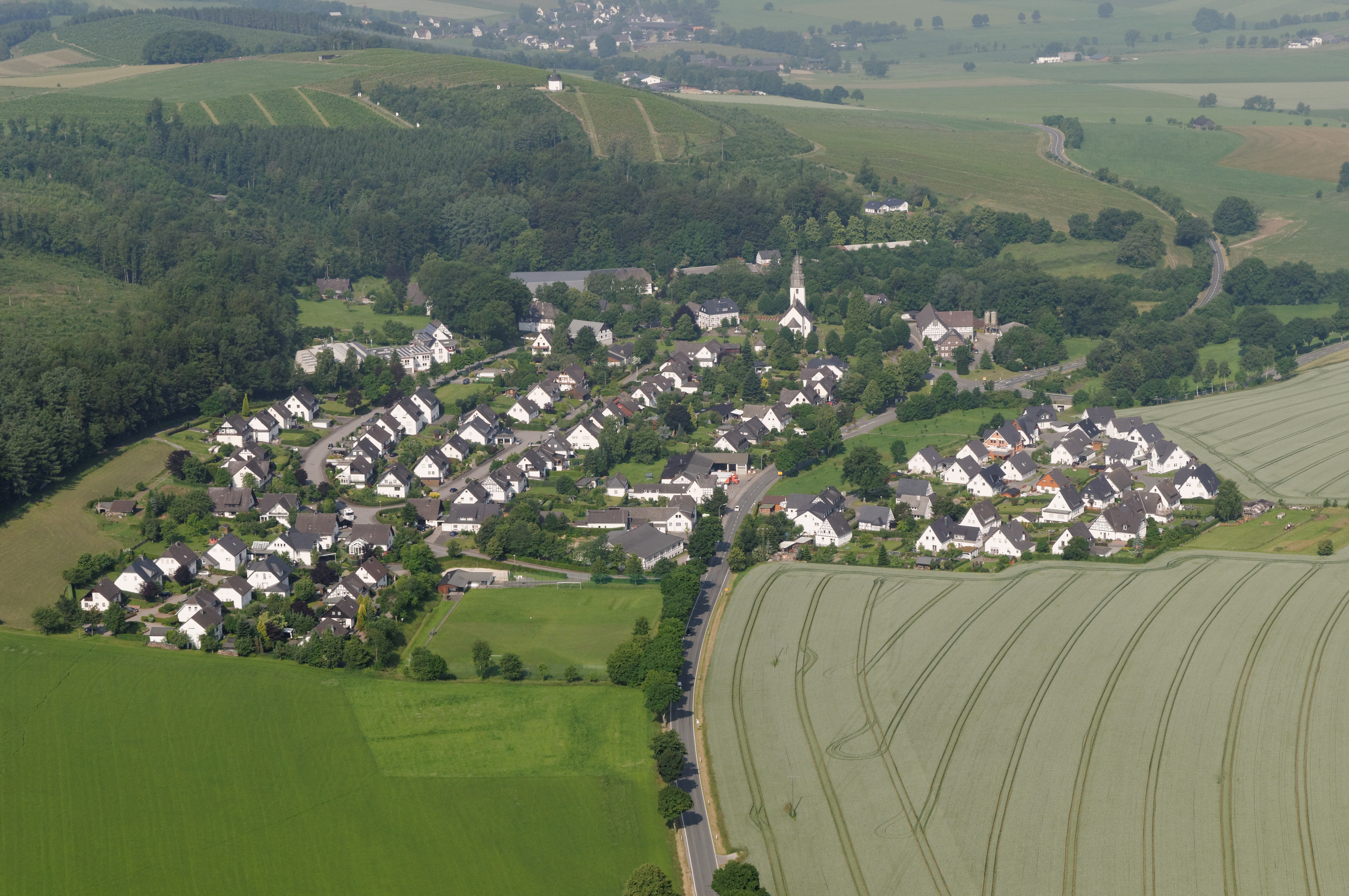
- Interactive map of Wormbach
- Location within Germany Location within North Rhine-Westphalia
- Coordinates: 51°10′0″N 8°15′23″E
- Country: Germany
- State: North Rhine-Westphalia
- Admin. region: Arnsberg
- District: Hochsauerlandkreis
- Town: Schmallenberg

Population (2021-12-31)
  - Total: 417
- Time zone: UTC+01:00 (CET)
  - Summer (DST): UTC+02:00 (CEST)

Wormbach is a locality in the municipality Schmallenberg in the High Sauerland District in North Rhine-Westphalia, Germany.

The village has 417 inhabitants and lies in the north of the municipality of Schmallenberg at a height of around 500 m. Wormbach borders on the villages of Werpe, Felbecke, Berghausen, Ebbinghof, Obringhausen and Schmallenberg. Schmallenberg’s aerodrome (Motorsport- und Segelflugplatz Rennefeld) is between the villages of Werpe and Wormbach. In the village centre the Kreisstraße 25 meets the Kreisstraße 31.

The first written document mentioning Worunbach dates from 1072 in a charter from Grafschaft Abbey of bishop Anno of Cologne. The village used to belong to the municipality of Wormbach in Amt Schmallenberg until the end of 1974.

== Gallery ==
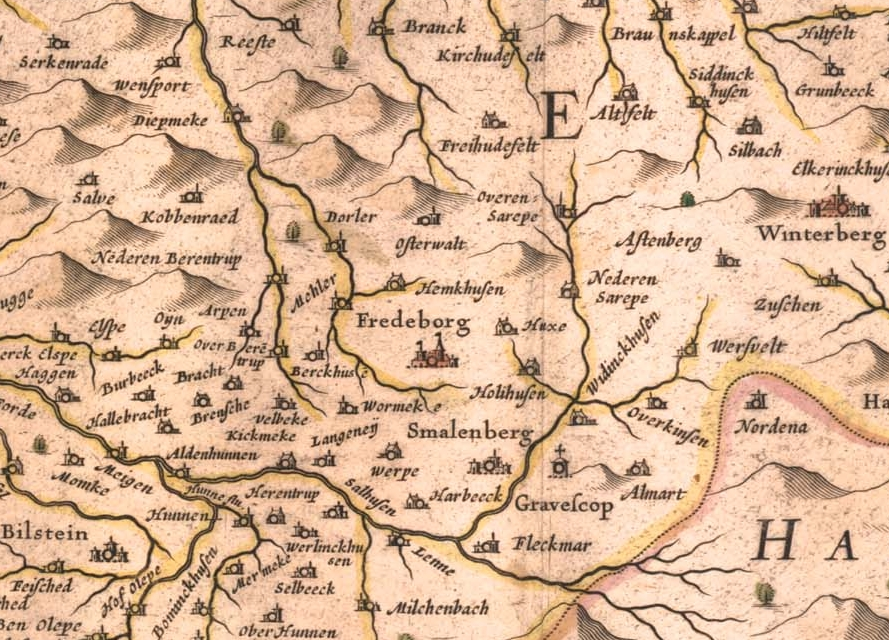
„Wormek“ 1645 - Westphalia Ducatus (Duchy of Westphalia)

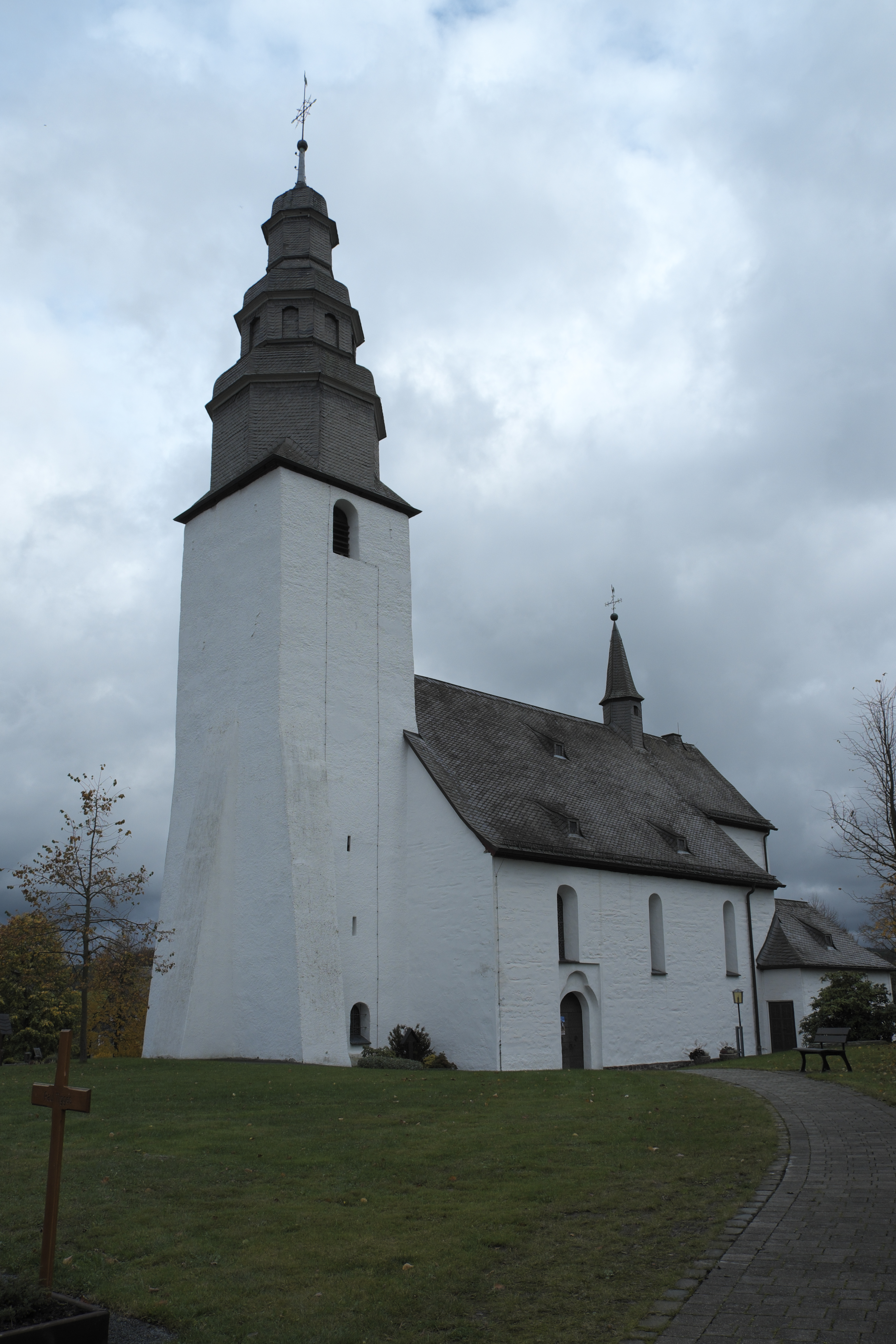
Peter and Paul Church, Wormbach
