= Felbecke =

- Stadtteil of Schmallenberg
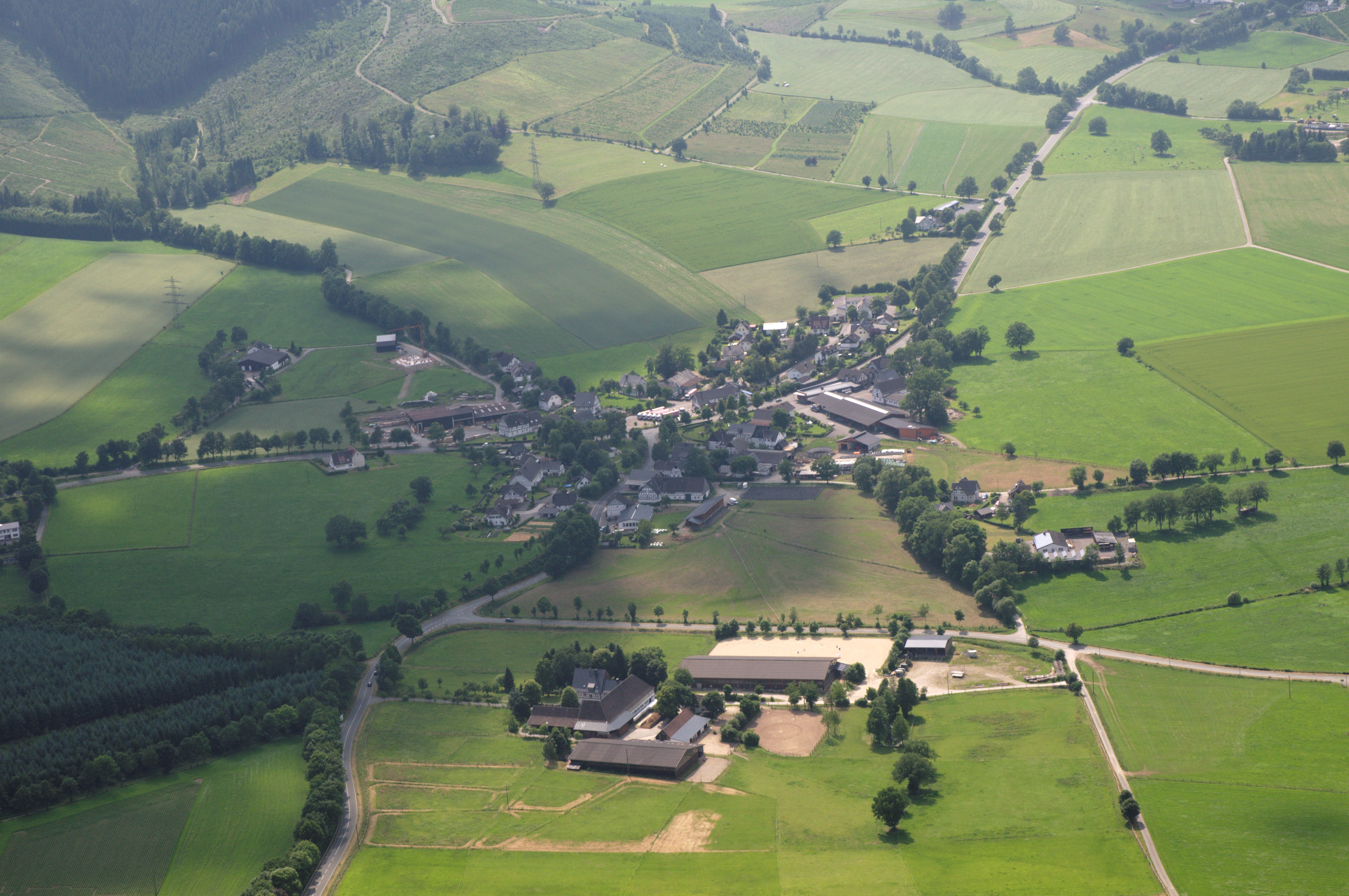
- Interactive map of Felbecke
- Location within Germany Location within North Rhine-Westphalia
- Coordinates: 51°9′52″N 8°13′43″E
- Country: Germany
- State: North Rhine-Westphalia
- Admin. region: Arnsberg
- District: Hochsauerlandkreis
- Town: Schmallenberg

Population (2021-12-31)
  - Total: 150
- Time zone: UTC+01:00 (CET)
  - Summer (DST): UTC+02:00 (CEST)

Felbecke is a locality in the municipality Schmallenberg in the district Hochsauerlandkreis in North Rhine-Westphalia, Germany.

The locality Felbecke has 150 inhabitants and lies in the west of the municipality of Schmallenberg at a height of around 391 m. The river Werde flows through the village. In the village centre the Landesstraße 737 meets the Kreisstraße 31. Felbecke borders on the villages of Selkentrop, Oberberndorf, Werpe, Werntrop and Wormbach.

The village used to belong to the municipality of Wormbach in Amt Schmallenberg until the end of 1974.

== Gallery ==
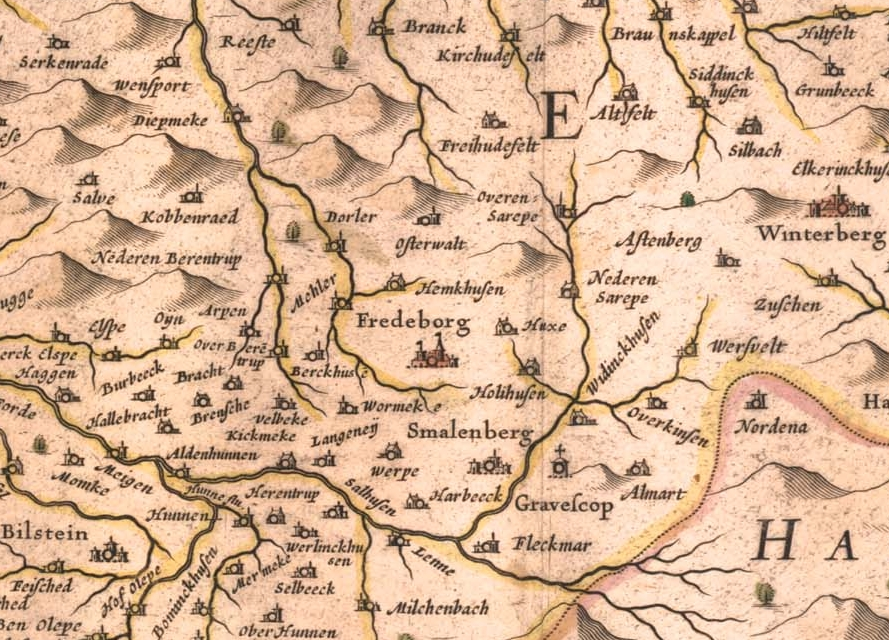
„Velbeke“ 1645 - Westphalia Ducatus (Duchy of Westphalia)

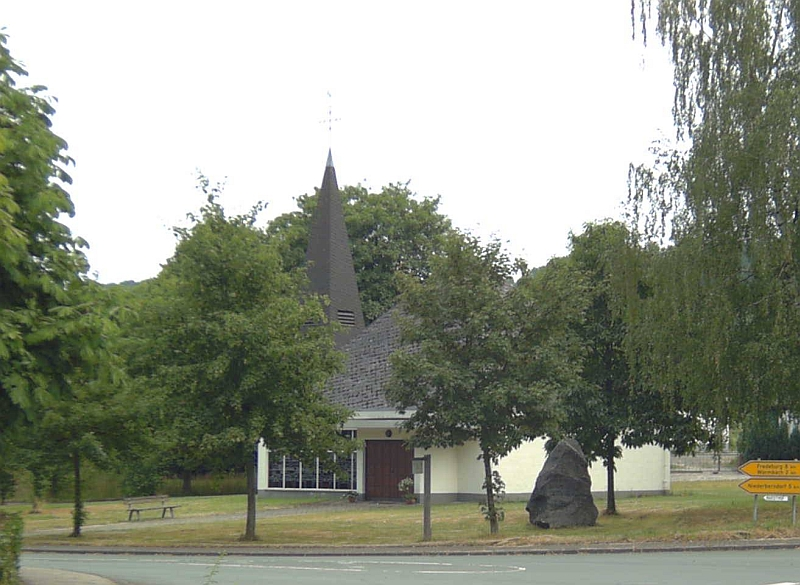
Chapel in Felbeck
