= Hebbecke =

Hebbecke may refer to:

- Hebbecke, a tributary of the Wupper in North Rhine-Westphalia, Germany
- a district of Schmallenberg, North Rhine-Westphalia, Germany
