= Hans Frankenthal =

Hans Frankenthal (15 July 1926 – 22 December 1999) was a German Jew who was deported to the Auschwitz concentration camp in occupied Poland in 1943. Having survived the Holocaust along with his brother Ernst, Frankenthal returned to his home in Germany where he experienced the common disbelief and denial of Nazi war crimes.

Frankenthal eventually wrote an autobiography in the 1990s entitled Verweigerte Rückkehr, which was published half a year before his death. The English edition was published in 2002 under the title The Unwelcome One: Returning Home from Auschwitz.

== Childhood ==
Frankenthal was born into a family of prominent Jewish butchers and cattle dealers in Schmallenberg, Province of Westphalia. In the Frankenthal home the Jewish religion was strictly followed mainly due to the Orthodox Jewish traditions of Frankenthal's mother, Adele Frankenthal. In the village of Schmallenberg there was a strong Christian, mainly Roman Catholic, presence.

After Jewish businesses began to be boycotted following the Nazi Party's seizure of power in 1933, the Frankenthal family was no longer able to properly provide themselves with basic necessities. Due to attempts to get around the new laws through extensive contacts in the German community, the Frankenthal family received several visits from the SA to investigate their ongoing commercial activities. The contacts themselves were also running a great risk in that the names of so-called "Traitors to the People and State" were published in the Nazi newspaper Rote Erde ("Red Earth"). To avoid being seen, the farmers preferred to trade at night; however, after the curfew for Jews was enacted, this was no longer possible. At this point, several local Jews emigrated to the USA and Holland.

Frankenthal's father, Max Frankenthal, believed that the Nazis would not harass his family to a large extent because he was a decorated soldier in the First World War. Max Frankenthal was awarded the Iron Cross Second Class for his service during the war, having reached the rank of sergeant, and was a member of the veterans' union after the war. He took part in the erection of the first war memorial for the fallen soldiers from Schmallenberg.

== Discrimination prior to the Holocaust ==
In 1937 Max Frankenthal was arrested after allegations from German farmers in Friedeburg that he had attempted to manipulate the weighing scale in order to haggle the price of stock down. He was only held for several hours because the owner of the scales spoke out in his defence. This was, however, only the first of several groundless arrests that were used to intimidate the Jewish community of Schmallenberg. The charges ranged from claims of theft to Rassenschande (crimes against race).

On 10 November 1938, the local synagogue was burnt down and most of the Jews were arrested, including Max. All over the village Jewish homes were raided and vandalised. The Nazis dubbed the country-wide event "Kristallnacht". The women and children were released the same day, but the men remained in custody in a shelter for the homeless. The families of those still in custody were able to bring food to their loved ones until the inmates were transferred to the Gestapo jail in nearby Dortmund. The Jews remaining in Schmallenberg were then forced to sign over the title deeds of their property with the promise that it would bring their husbands and sons back. During the Kristallnacht, only one German in Schmallenberg is known to have protested. Dina Falke stood on the street and asked the SA troopers what the Jews had ever done to them until she was silenced by worried family members. Several citizens actively aided the SA in destroying Jewish property and raiding Jewish Homes. Robert Krämer allegedly helped the SA by providing straw to set the synagogue in flames.

On 28 November, the Jewish men were allowed to return home. They had been transferred from the jail in Dortmund to the Sachsenhausen concentration camp near Berlin. Max and Adele had to sign their agreement of the selling of their land to the Arisierung program. This program involved the confiscation of Jewish-owned property for the fictitious Aryan master race. In addition to the confiscation of their property, the Jewish men had to prove that they would leave the country within several weeks, or face the penalty of returning to the concentration camps, this time with their families. Max Frankenthal tried to begin plans for the family's emigration, but eventually was unable to come up with money, and was still convinced that the Nazis would not continue their harassment of his family.

At this point the Nazis began to make life for the Jews even harder. They implemented Arbeiteinsätze, in which the Jews were forced to work on projects such as digging ditches to hold water for fighting fires in the upcoming war. Max Frankenthal worked in a factory owned by a friend where he avoided exploitation until the factory was no longer able to hold forced labourers. He and his brother, Ernst Frankenthal, were then sent to work for the city, where Emil died of a stroke. The German government ceased to recognise the citizenship of Jews and forced them to add the name Sara to all female names and Israel to all male names.

As the school in Schmallenberg was now closed to Jewish children, Frankenthal and his brother began attending classes at a workshop in Dortmund where they learnt hand skills, foreign languages and were educated in Zionism. In May 1941 this workshop was closed by the Dortmund Gestapo and the students were forced to work for the state. Frankenthal and his brother began work for a roadworks company named Lahrmann. He later learnt that his father also worked in the same work party.

== Deportation ==
On 28 February 1943, the construction site manager informed the workers that they would be required to report to the former Jewish school in Dortmund for the checking of their work papers. Upon their arrival both Hans and his brother Ernst were placed under arrest and then held for several days before being loaded into cattle transport wagons and sent east.

Frankenthal, and several others of those arrested, received an order from one of the officers who was in charge of the troopers to pack the Jews' luggage into several wagons. At a train station in Bielefeld, Frankenthal noticed that these wagons were no longer attached to the train. Because his father had already been detained in a concentration camp, Frankenthal asked what was going on. His father informed him that they would not require their luggage at their destination.

During the journey the inmates’ food and water rations were simply cancelled, and several of the older ones did not survive. After spending three days and three nights in the train, the arrested Jews arrived in the Auschwitz concentration camp complex.

== Internment ==
As the family arrived at the camp, Max Frankenthal told his two sons that he was sure that he would not survive the ordeal, and that should they get out, to go back to Schmallenberg. The Jews were then ordered to exit the train. In the confusion the two sons lost their parents, who they later learned were sent directly to the gas chambers. When asked by the SS, Frankenthal claimed to be 18, so that he would be put to work. He was then ordered to enter a group where he found his three uncles and a cousin. Those selected for work were loaded onto trucks and transported to labor camps. Frankenthal was sent to Auschwitz III Monowitz.

As they arrived, the inmates were forced to strip naked and were sent to their barracks where their bodies were shaved. They then had their inmate numbers tattooed onto their arms. Frankenthal became 104920 and his brother 104921. The inmates were then sorted out according to skills. The brothers both claimed to be locksmiths, although they had only begun training at the workshop in Dortmund in preparation for possible emigration to Palestine. They were then showered and issued with their striped uniforms.

The Blockältester, or inmate block leader, then greeted the new arrivals to inform them of their current situation: they were in an extermination camp, and any family members, whom they could not see in this block, had probably already been gassed.

The inmates in Frankenthal's block were composed mainly of Jews, with several political prisoners as well. The prisoners were forced to work under horrendous conditions for long hours. The inmates also worked alongside civilian workers from the Polish and German populations who instructed the inmates inside the camp, but not inside the electric fence.

Most of the prisoners in Monowitz worked for IG Farben in Liquidation. During his internment at the camp, Frankenthal played a minor role in the largely unsuccessful resistance. He was also subject to dental experiments from SS doctors.

On 18 January 1945, the death march began for the prisoners of Auschwitz. On the second day of the march the group reached Gleiwitz (Gliwice), where they were loaded onto open cattle wagons and sent to Buchenwald concentration camp. Upon arrival the SS soldiers accompanying the Auschwitz inmates discovered that Buchenwald was full, and could no longer take on any inmates. From Buchenwald they were then sent to Mittelbau-Dora, a new site for the V2 production since bombing raids on the Peenemünde facility threatened to end the project.

Here the inmates built V2 rockets in an underground factory. When the inmates began the deliberate sabotage of German rockets, prisoners were hanged from the ceiling as a warning to the other workers. During an aerial bombardment of the camp on 3 April 1945, Frankenthal, his brother, and another inmate managed to escape. In the confusion the brothers were separated from the third fugitive. After three days they were recaptured by a group of Volkssturm (German militia). They were put on transports and sent east. At some point Frankenthal lost consciousness and awoke two days after they were liberated by Russian troops.

== Liberation ==
The train stopped at Theresienstadt concentration camp, where they were ordered into a new set of barracks shortly before the Soviet Red Army arrived and liberated the inmates. Despite the now available food, water and basic medical care, many of the freed prisoners died in the days after due to the lasting effects of malnutrition and maltreatment and a typhoid fever epidemic. Shortly after the liberation, Frankenthal found his aunt in Theresienstadt, who had survived a Ghetto because of her status as Halbjüdin (Half-Jew). He and his brother then organised their return to Schmallenberg through the Displaced Persons Program. He was then 18 years old.

== After the war ==
Upon their return to Schmallenberg, the brothers found out that although several houses were destroyed during the war, their parents' house was not among them. The house was, however, inhabited by some relatives who had already made their way from a ghetto back to Schmallenberg. They found that only 7 out of 51 Jewish locals had survived the war.

The following years were difficult, partly because the locals did not believe what the Frankenthals told them about the camps and did not want to discuss it. It would be almost 20 years before Hans would testify at the first of the Frankfurt Auschwitz trials.

After retiring from his work in running a butcher’s shop, he became deputy chairman of the Auschwitz Committee of the FRG and a member of the Central Council of Jews in Germany. He also spoke several times in favour of payment of compensation to the camp labourers. Towards the end of his life, he received a monthly pension of 93 Deutschmarks per month.

== Family ==
In 1948, Hans married Annie Labe and they had three children who were brought up as Catholic; the couple divorced in 1976.

He died in Dortmund on 22 December 1999 and was buried at the Jewish cemetery in Hagen-Eilpe.

Ernst's daughter (Hans' niece) Ruth Frankenthal was a life-long campaigner against anti-Semitism and was Chairwoman of the Society for Christian-Jewish Cooperation for several years; she was awarded the German Order of Merit. She was raised in Münster.

== Hans Frankenthal Prize ==
From 2011 onwards the Foundation Auschwitz Committee (Stiftung Auschwitz-Komitee) inaugurated the Hans Frankenthal Prize. This annual prize is awarded to groups, initiatives and institutions that accomplish educational work and awareness training according to the aims of the Auschwitz Committee for the remembrance of the Shoah and against neo-fascist activities.

== Bibliography ==
- Frankenthal, Hans (1999). Verweigerte Rückkehr. Frankfurt am Main: Fischer Taschenbuch Verlag (1999) ISBN 3-596-14493-0
- Frankenthal, Hans (2002). The Unwelcome One. Returning Home from Auschwitz. In collaboration with Andreas Plake, Babette Quinkert, and Florian Schmaltz. Translated from German by John A. Broadwin. Evanston, Ill.: Northwestern University Press (2002) ISBN 0-8101-1887-4
