= Schmallenberg =

- Town
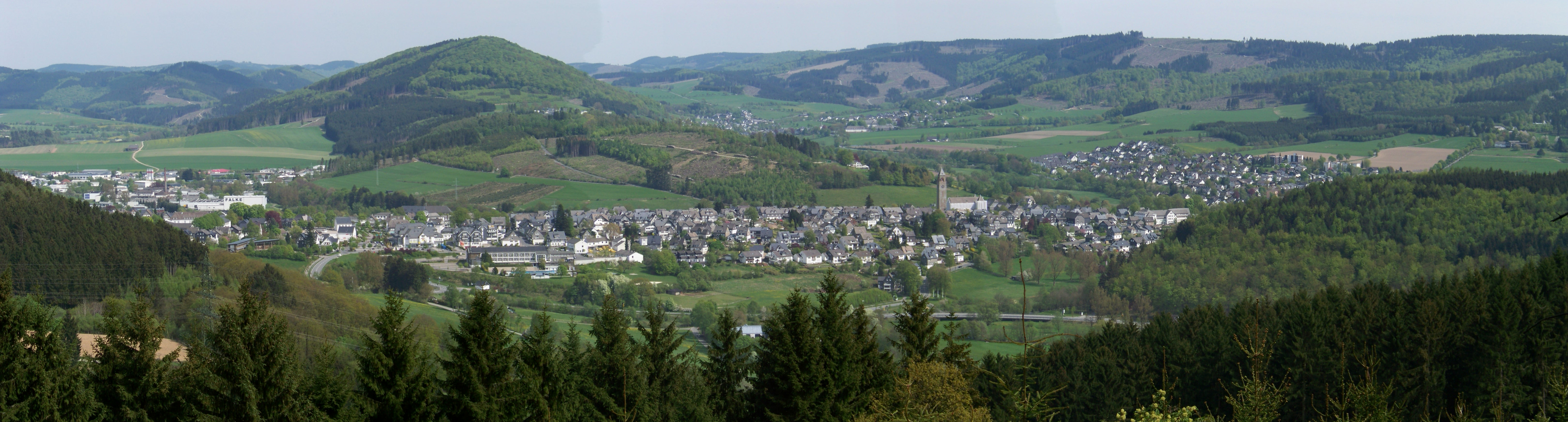
- Panorama of Schmallenberg

- Coat of arms

- Location of Schmallenberg within Hochsauerlandkreis district
- Interactive map of Schmallenberg
- Location within Germany Location within North Rhine-Westphalia
- Coordinates: 51°08′56″N 8°17′04″E
- Country: Germany
- State: North Rhine-Westphalia
- Admin. region: Arnsberg
- District: Hochsauerlandkreis
- Subdivisions: 83

Government
  - Mayor (2020–25): Burkhard König (CDU)

Area
  - Total: 303.1 km^{2} (117.0 sq mi)
- Elevation: 329–831 m (1,079–2,726 ft)

Population (2025-12-31)
  - Total: 24,728
  - Density: 81.58/km^{2} (211.3/sq mi)
- Time zone: UTC+01:00 (CET)
  - Summer (DST): UTC+02:00 (CEST)
- Postal codes: 57392
- Dialling codes: 02971, 02972, 02974, 02975, 02977
- Vehicle registration: HSK
- Website: www.schmallenberg.de

Schmallenberg (German pronunciation: [ˈʃmalənbɛʁk]; Westphalian: Smalmereg) is a town and a climatic health resort in the High Sauerland District, Germany. By area, it is the third biggest of all cities and towns of the state of North Rhine-Westphalia and the second biggest of the region of Westphalia.

With the central town and the rural Bad Fredeburg Kneipp health resort, the town has two urban settlements. Additionally, 82 villages and hamlets belong to the town's territory. Alternatively known as “the Schmallenberg Sauerland”, the Town of Schmallenberg is famous for five health resorts and nine villages which have been awarded gold for their beauty in the nationwide “Our village has a future” contest.

== Geography ==
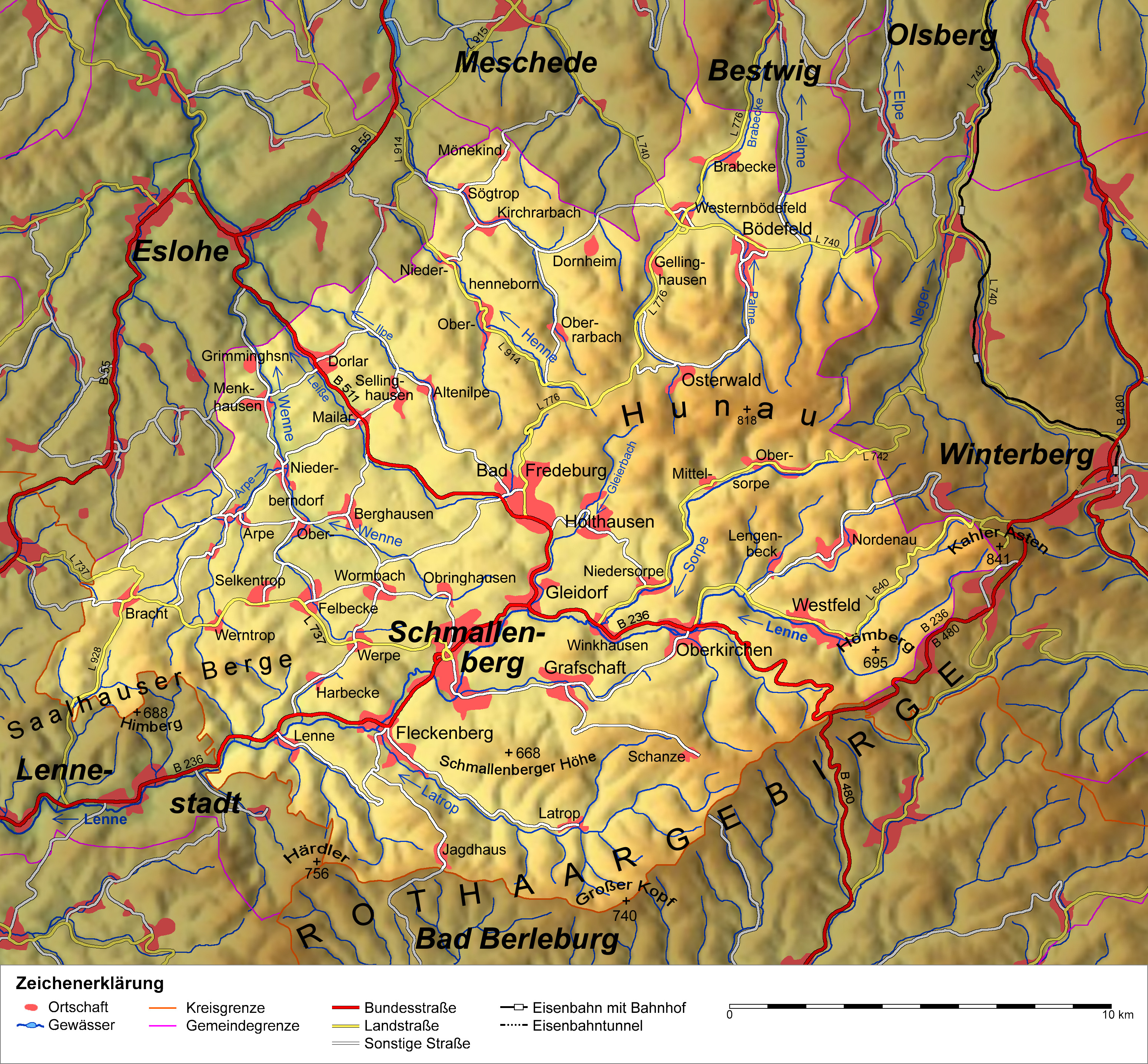
Schmallenberg (map)

Schmallenberg is located to the southeast of the Sauerland mountainous landscape. The Rothaar Mountains make up a part of the town's territory. Through the central town flows the river Lenne.

It is situated (linear distances):

- 14 miles (22 km) south of Meschede (capital of the High Sauerland District)
- 20 miles (33 km) southeast of Arnsberg (most populous town of the district and capital of the larger Governmental District of Arnsberg)
- 44 miles (70 km) southeast of Dortmund (most populous city of the governmental district, of the Ruhr Metropolitan Area and of Westphalia.)
- 60 miles (96 km) northeast of Cologne (most populous city of the state of North Rhine-Westphalia and of the Northern Rhineland)
- 66 miles (106 km) southeast of Düsseldorf (capital of the state)
- 238 miles (383 km) southwest of Berlin (capital and most populous city of Germany)

=== Neighbouring towns and municipalities ===
Schmallenberg borders on the Municipality of Bestwig and the town of Meschede in the north, in the east the town of Winterberg, in the south the town of Bad Berleburg, and in the west the municipality of Eslohe (Sauerland) and the town of Lennestadt.

=== Town divisions ===
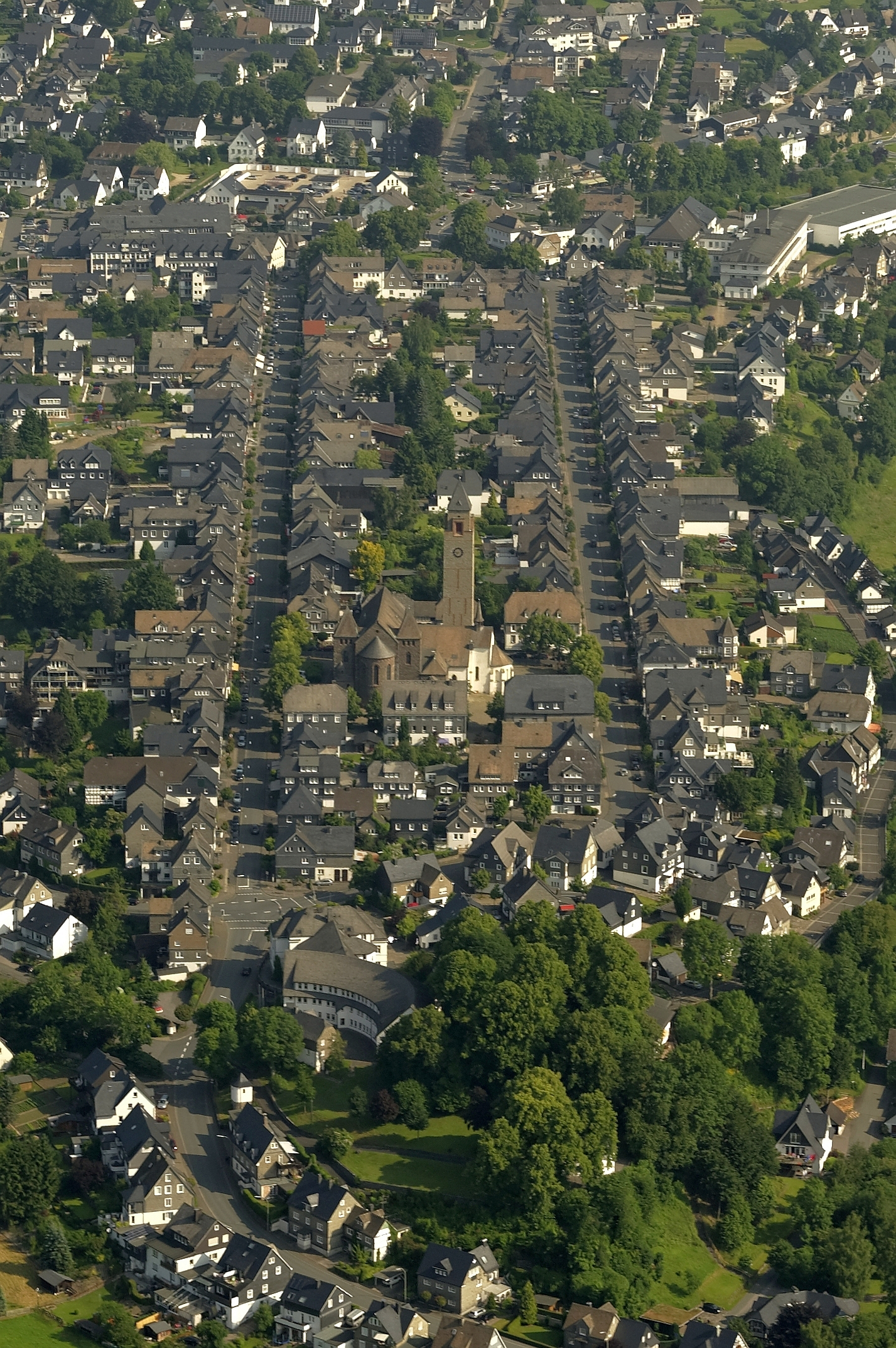
Schmallenberg old town, part of the central town

In the 1975 local government reorganization in the Sauerland and Paderborn, the pre-existing town of Schmallenberg was merged with the town of Fredeburg (“Bad Fredeburg” today) and with the municipalities of Berghausen, Bödefeld-Land, Dorlar, Fleckenberg, Freiheit Bödefeld, Grafschaft, Lenne, Oberkirchen, Rarbach and Wormbach which consisted of a total of 82 villages and hamlets.

On December 31, 2019, the modern Town of Schmallenberg had 25,146 inhabitants by main residence in the following 83 places:

- Schmallenberg (central town) (6,100)
- Bad Fredeburg (3,900)
- Fleckenberg (1,545)
- Gleidorf (1,378)
- Bödefeld (1,126)
- Grafschaft (1,096)
- Dorlar (879)
- Oberkirchen (788)
- Westfeld (734)
- Holthausen (567)
- Bracht (454)
- Wormbach (403)
- Oberhenneborn (385)
- Lenne (348)
- Westernbödefeld (338)
- Kirchrarbach (277)
- Arpe (238)
- Niederberndorf (229)
- Niedersorpe (227)
- Nordenau (226)
- Berghausen (218)
- Winkhausen (212)
- Werpe (209)
- Brabecke (204)
- Sellinghausen (183)
- Latrop (177)
- Altenilpe (160)
- Huxel (150)
- Felbecke (144)
- Selkentrop (143)
- Harbecke (132)
- Mailar (126)
- Gellinghausen (118)
- Rehsiepen (112)
- Sögtrop (106)
- Heiminghausen (102)
- Menkhausen (96)
- Osterwald (91)
- Kückelheim (80)
- Niederhenneborn (67)
- Jagdhaus (66)
- Werntrop (66)
- Grimminghausen (58)
- Hundesossen (56)
- Lengenbeck (55)
- Ohlenbach (53)
- Obersorpe (51)
- Oberrarbach (50)
- Oberberndorf (49)
- Inderlenne (47)
- Schanze (42)
- Obringhausen (39)
- Dornheim (38)
- Kirchilpe (36)
- Mittelsorpe (33)
- Herschede (27)
- Nierentrop (27)
- Ebbinghof (26)
- Mönekind (26)
- Walbecke (23)
- Sellmecke (16)
- Vorwald (16)
- Hanxleden (15)
- Altenhof (13)
- Almert (13)
- Nesselbach (13)
- Twismecke (11)
- Föckinghausen (10)
- Berghof (10)
- Rellmecke (9)
- Hebbecke (9)
- Hoher Knochen (9)
- Wulwesort (9)
- Rotbusch (8)
- Sonderhof (7)
- Keppel (7)
- Rimberg (7)
- Lanfert (6)
- Landenbeckerbruch (6)
- Waidmannsruh (6)
- Silberg (4)
- Hiege (3)
- Störmecke (3)

=== Twin towns ===
Schmallenberg twin towns are:

- Burgess Hill (United Kingdom)
- Wimereux (France)

== History ==
In 1072, a Benedictine monastery of Grafschaft was founded near the Wilzenberg mountain by St. Anno II, Archbishop of Cologne.

The oldest available documents speaking of a “town of Schmallenberg” are the archbishop's and the town council's deeds from 1243. There were several causes which let the place of “Smalenburg” (old German, “narrow castle”) receive town rights.

Before Schmallenberg received town rights, there had been a castle of Schmallenberg which must have been destroyed around 1240. It was owned by the Archbishop of Cologne Conrad of Hochstadt and the Grafschaft Abbey. The Knight Johann Kolve had the order to protect this castle. At this time, there already must have been some kind of settlement around. The archbishop did not consider the destroyed castle as useful any more. Furthermore, the local settlement was unprotected and in a risky situation because of the castle. That is why the archbishop and the Grafschaft Abbey wanted to fortify the place, leaving the old castle outside the town wall.

In 1244, Schmallenberg received town rights and got a mayor and an own council. Johann Kolve, who had recommended this solution, became the commander of the new fortified town. He got 30 shillings every year on St. Martin’s Day as an indemnity, an own property and a judicial immunity was granted. The new Town of Schmallenberg thanked Kolve for its new protecting wall. He did not have to pay taxes and did not have any civic duties.

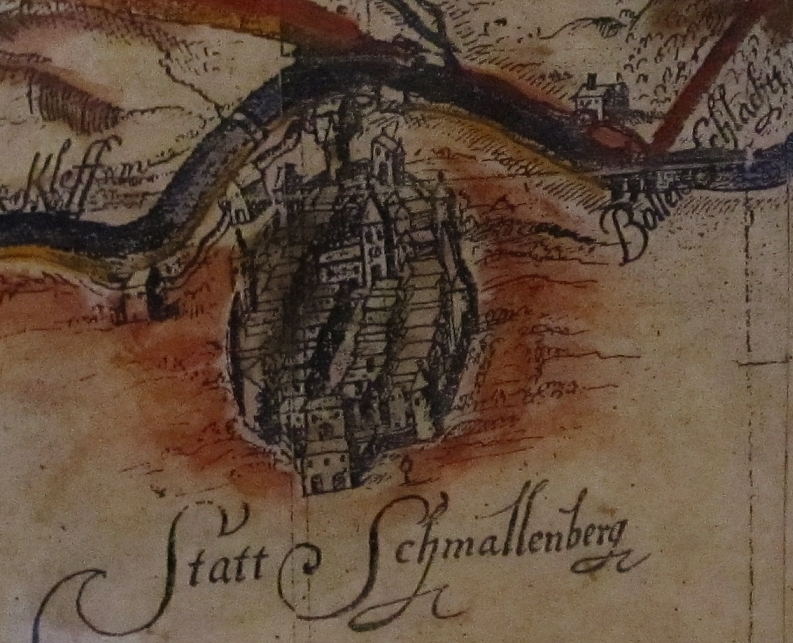
Schmallenberg, 1653

There is evidence from 1273 and 1292 of blacksmiths working in Schmallenberg and there have been cutlers and trip hammers for a long time. The town joined alliances with Medebach, Hallenberg and Winterberg and was a member of the Hanseatic League. It used to be a Colognian minting place in the 13th century. After weapon techniques had changed and to the archbishop, Schmallenberg had lost its fortified status, the town went through an economical crisis in the 16th century.

In 1812, the wall and its gates were torn down. In the last of the three big fires of 1732, 1746 and 1822, 131 of 151 houses burnt down and Schmallenberg was rebuilt in the now characteristic structure (“Prussian ladder system”) with its half-timbered houses and slated roofs.

In 1800, the town's iron manufacturing industry was the second largest in the whole Duchy of Westphalia. Major competition and high costs led to the decline of the industry, and a shift towards textile manufacturing in Schmallenberg. By 1871, there were seven companies belonging to the textile industry. Textile manufacturing remained the most important business type for the following years.

== Population ==
Historical population

Year	Pop.	±% p.a.
1965	22,797	—
1970	23,726	+0.80%
1975	24,774	+0.87%
1980	25,017	+0.20%
1985	24,325	−0.56%
1990	25,077	+0.61%
1995	26,620	+1.20%

Year	Pop.	±% p.a.
2000	26,556	−0.05%
2005	25,992	−0.43%
2010	25,281	−0.55%
2015	25,230	−0.04%
2020	24,806	−0.34%
2025	24,728	−0.06%

Source: Landesdatabank Nordrhein-Westfalen

== Economy ==
Since the 19th century Schmallenberg traditionally was one of the Sauerland's centers of textile industry. The largest company today is the Falke company. That's why the town received the nickname die Strumpfstadt (“the sock town”). Today, 25 per cent of the population work in forest and wood economy or in tourism. In 2016 there were 9,503 jobs based on social insurances.

Major Schmallenberg companies are:

- “Falke KGaA” (textile industry, 2019: 3,325 employees)
- Feldhaus (construction company, 2019: 700 employees)
- “Burgbad” (hidden champions, bathroom furniture manufacturer with headquarters in Bad Fredeburg, 2021: 681 employees)

=== Fraunhofer Society ===
The Fraunhofer Institute for Molecular Biology and Applied Ecology (IME) conducts research in the field of applied life sciences from a molecular level to entire ecosystems. The IME has around 140 employees working at its locations in Schmallenberg and Aachen.

== Transport ==
=== Air transport ===
==== Airfield ====
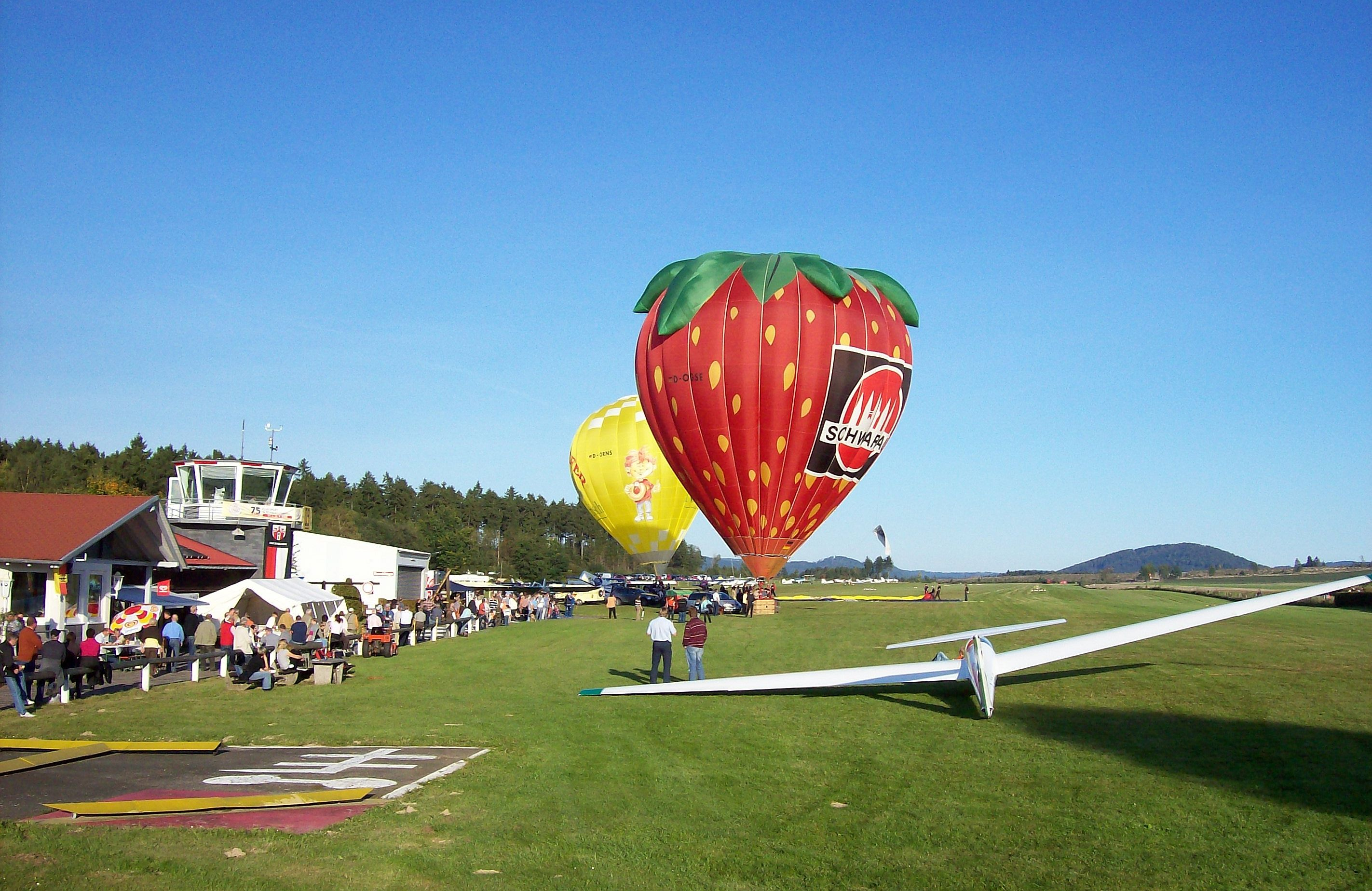
Rennefeld airfield (Flugplatz Rennefeld)

Schmallenberg’s aerodrome is the Rennefeld motorsport and glider airfield (Motorsport- und Segelflugplatz Rennefeld) between the villages of Wormbach and Werpe. ICAO-Code: EDKR.

==== Airports ====
The town is surrounded by the following airports (near to far): Paderborn/Lippstadt (PAD), Dortmund (DTM), Kassel (KSF), Cologne/Bonn (CGN), Münster/Osnabrück (FMO), Düsseldorf (DUS) and Frankfurt am Main (FRA).

=== Private transport ===
==== Federal highways ====
The federal highways (Bundesstraßen) B 236 and B 511 run through the town's territory.

==== Autobahn ====
The Autobahn closest to Schmallenberg is the one in

- Meschede, Enste junction (20 mi/33 km for the A 46 to either Arnsberg or Brilon)

Other close junctions to different directions can be found in

- Olpe, Olpe junction (27 mi/43 km for the A 45 to either Frankfurt am Main/Cologne or Dortmund)
- Wenden (Sauerland), Krombach junction (27 mi/43 km for the A 4 to Cologne/Frankfurt am Main/Dortmund/Olpe/A 4/A 45)
- Bad Wünnenberg, Wünnenberg-Haaren interchange (43 mi/69 km for the A 33 to Bielefeld/Paderborn or the A 44 to either Kassel or Dortmund/Airport)

=== Public transport ===
==== Trains ====
The closest train stations are the ones in Lennestadt-Altenhundem, Meschede and Winterberg.

==== Buses ====
Buses of Busverkehr Ruhr-Sieg (BRS) serve the town on the main routes. An association only founded for this purpose voluntarily provides a Bürgerbus (“civic bus”) on the less common routes. It mainly serves the smaller villages.

== Media ==
The Westfalenpost newspaper has editorial offices in Schmallenberg and Meschede and issues a daily local edition from Mondays to Saturdays. It shares its local edition with the Westfälische Rundschau which is another daily newspaper. The free advertising newspaper Sauerlandkurier also has an editorial office in Schmallenberg and is being issued on Wednesdays and Sundays.

Radio and TV news can be received from the West German Broadcasting (WDR). There is a WDR regional studio in Siegen which daily broadcasts news for South Westphalia on WDR 2 radio (on 93.8 FM) and in the Lokalzeit show for South Westphalia on television (WDR Fernsehen). Another local radio channel is Radio Sauerland from Meschede which can be received at 89.1 or 106.5 FM in Schmallenberg and on different frequencies in the whole High Sauerland District.

== Education ==
Schmallenberg has six elementary schools (Grundschulen) and three secondary schools (a Hauptschule, a Realschule and a Gymnasium).

There is also one special school of the High Sauerland District for emotional and social development, elementary and secondary level one (Martinsschule Dorlar), one folk high school (Volkshochschule) a district's school of music (Kreismusikschule) and Music Education Centre Südwestfalen (Musikbildungszentrum Südwestfalen).

== Culture ==
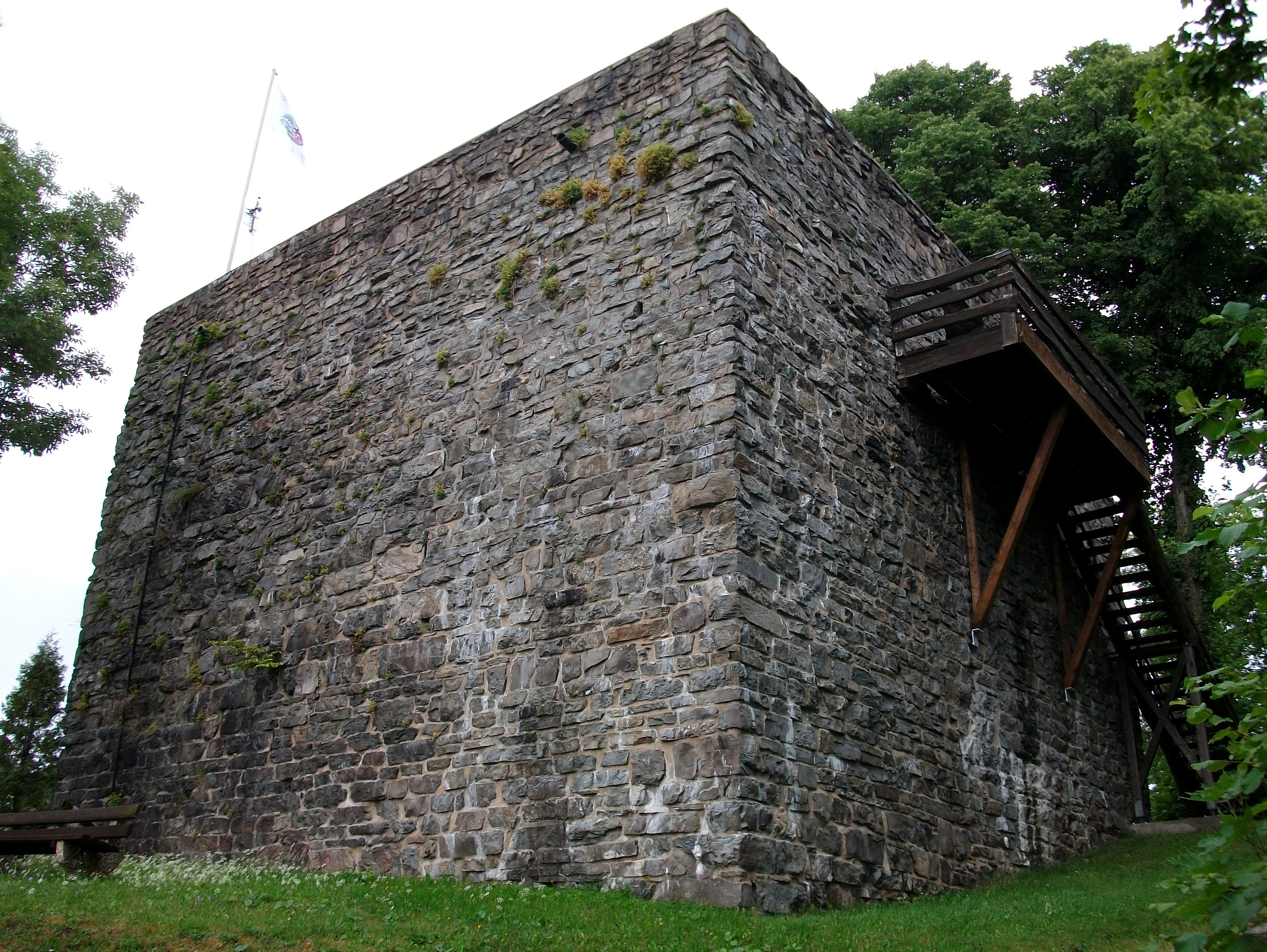
Rappelstein castle ruin in Nordenau

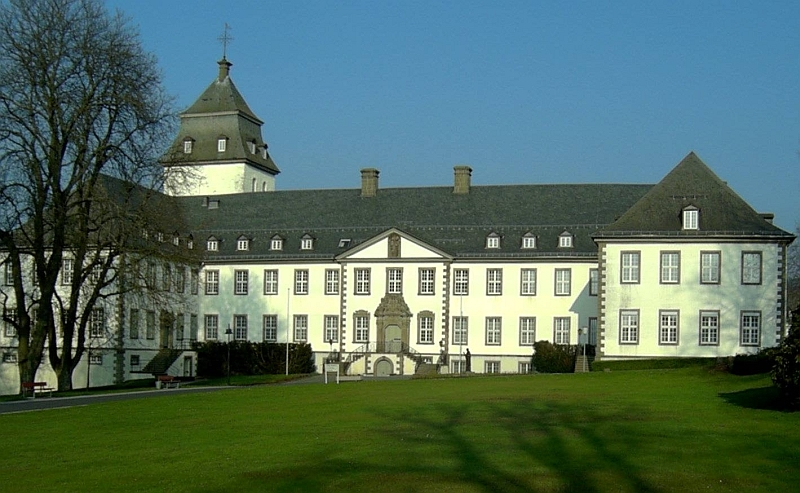
Grafschaft Abbey

Starting from Schmallenberg central town, visitors can go on a trip to the Nordenau Rappelstein castle ruin with great views, to the Grafschaft Abbey or to the nearby Kneipp health resort of Bad Fredeburg. There are some local museums like the Slate Mining and Home Region Museum in Holthausen, the Hesse Cutlery Factory in Fleckenberg, the Monastery Museum in Grafschaft or the Jurisdiction Museum in Bad Fredeburg.

Annual events in many places in town are the marksmen's festivals (Schützenfeste) lasting two to four days between April and August. They celebrate the local traditions including parades, traditional music and dance in a local hall or tent and a shooting of a wooden bird. There are 20 marksmen's clubs (Schützenvereine) in town and each has its own Schützenfest. The biggest club is the Schmallenberg Marksmen's Society of 1820 (Schützengesellschaft Schmallenberg 1820). The oldest Schützenverein in the modern Town of Schmallenberg is the Wormbach St. Judoc Marksmen's Fraternity (St.-Jodokus-Schützenbruderschaft Wormbach). It was founded in 1525.

Schmallenberg's town festival is the Schmallenberger Woche (“the Schmallenberg week”) and is being held every two years from a Wednesday to a Sunday in August. This event is celebrated in central Schmallenberg's old town and turns the Marksmen's Square park facility (Parkanlage Schützenplatz) and the Weststraße and Oststraße into a pedestrian area with music, entertainment and several stalls providing food, drinks, other commercial goods and information. Citizens from many of Schmallenberg's places, the twin towns and several associations take part in the festival.

On each Second Sunday of Advent and Friday and Saturday before there is a Christmas market around the central town's Catholic church. Further Christmas markets can be found on different dates in other places of the town.

== Sport ==
Schmallenberg has many hiking trails adding up to approximately 2,500 kilometers, leading through forests, across mountains and through valleys. The Rothaarsteig, a hiking trail along the Rothaar Mountains from Brilon to Dillenburg, leads through the town's territory. Recently, the town at the upper course of the Lenne River has developed into one of Westphalia's winter sport centers. The Nordic Center of North Rhine-Westphalia and the High Sauerland Cross-Country Skiing Center are both located in Westfeld. 250 kilometers of cross-country ski tracks and 30 ski lifts make any kind of skiing possible.

== Notable people ==
- Tom Astor (born 1943), is a German singer and composer
- Carl Johann Ludwig Dham (1809–1871), was a German lawyer, politician and member of the Frankfurt National Assembly in 1848/49
- Hans Frankenthal (1926–1999), was a Jew born in Schmallenberg who survived the holocaust and describes his ordeal in The Unwelcome One: Returning Home from Auschwitz
- Franziskus Hennemann (1882–1951), was a Titular Bishop in South Africa
- Hannah Neise (born 2000), is a German skeleton racer and Olympic gold medalists 2022
- Julian Schauerte (born 1988), is a German footballer who plays for K.A.S. Eupen.
- Christian Voss (born 1989), is a German motorsport team owner and former racing driver
