= Grafschaft Abbey =

Sanctuary in Germany

Coordinates: 51°08′40″N 8°19′27″E

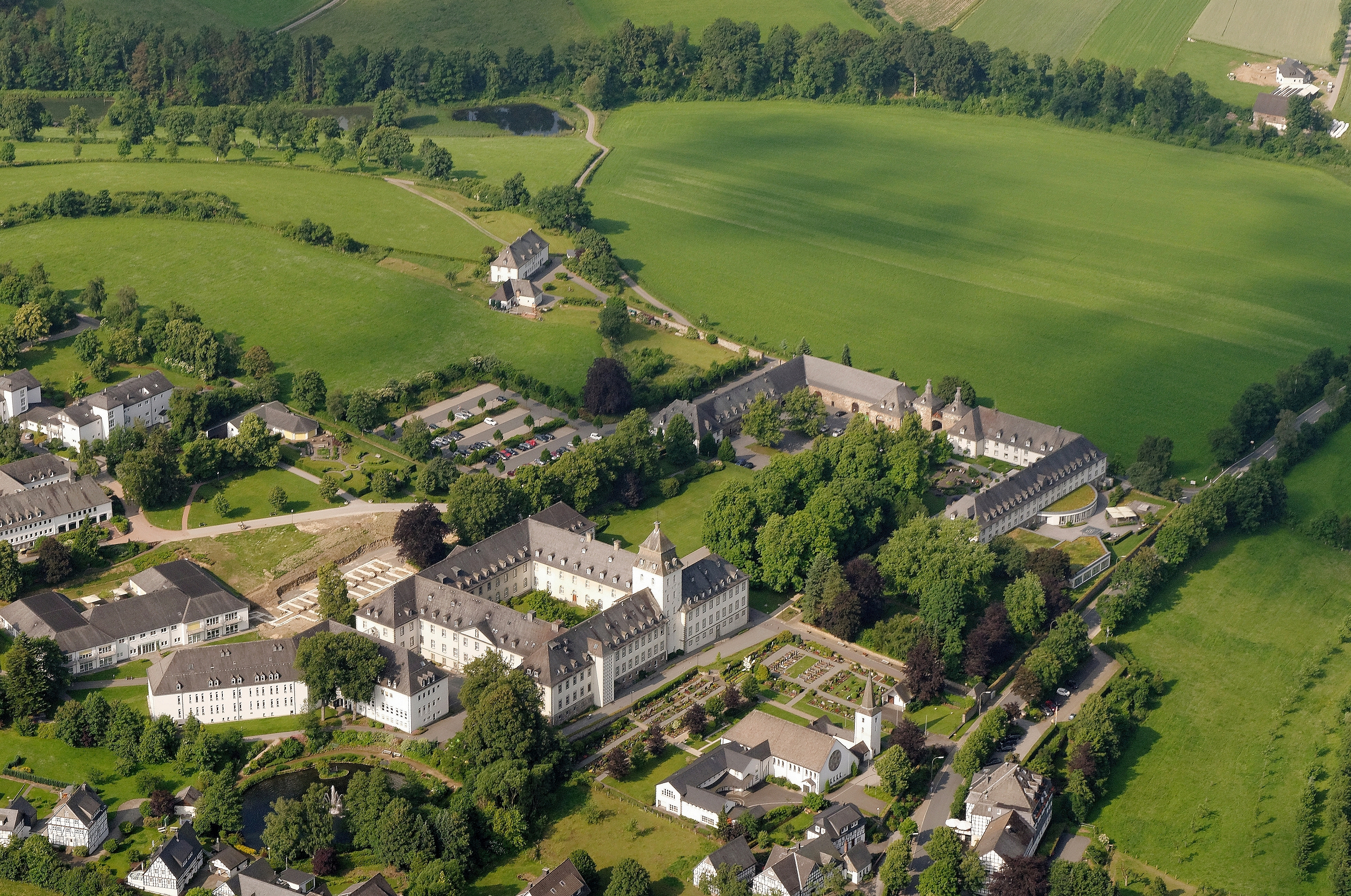
Aerial photograph of Kloster Grafschaft

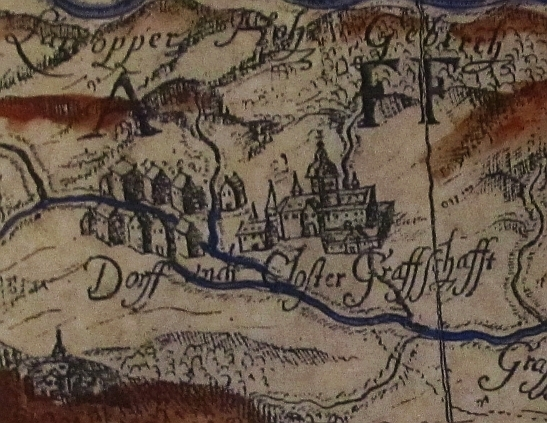
Grafschaft Abbey, 1653

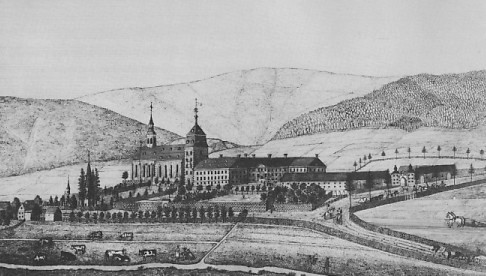
Abbey, 1830

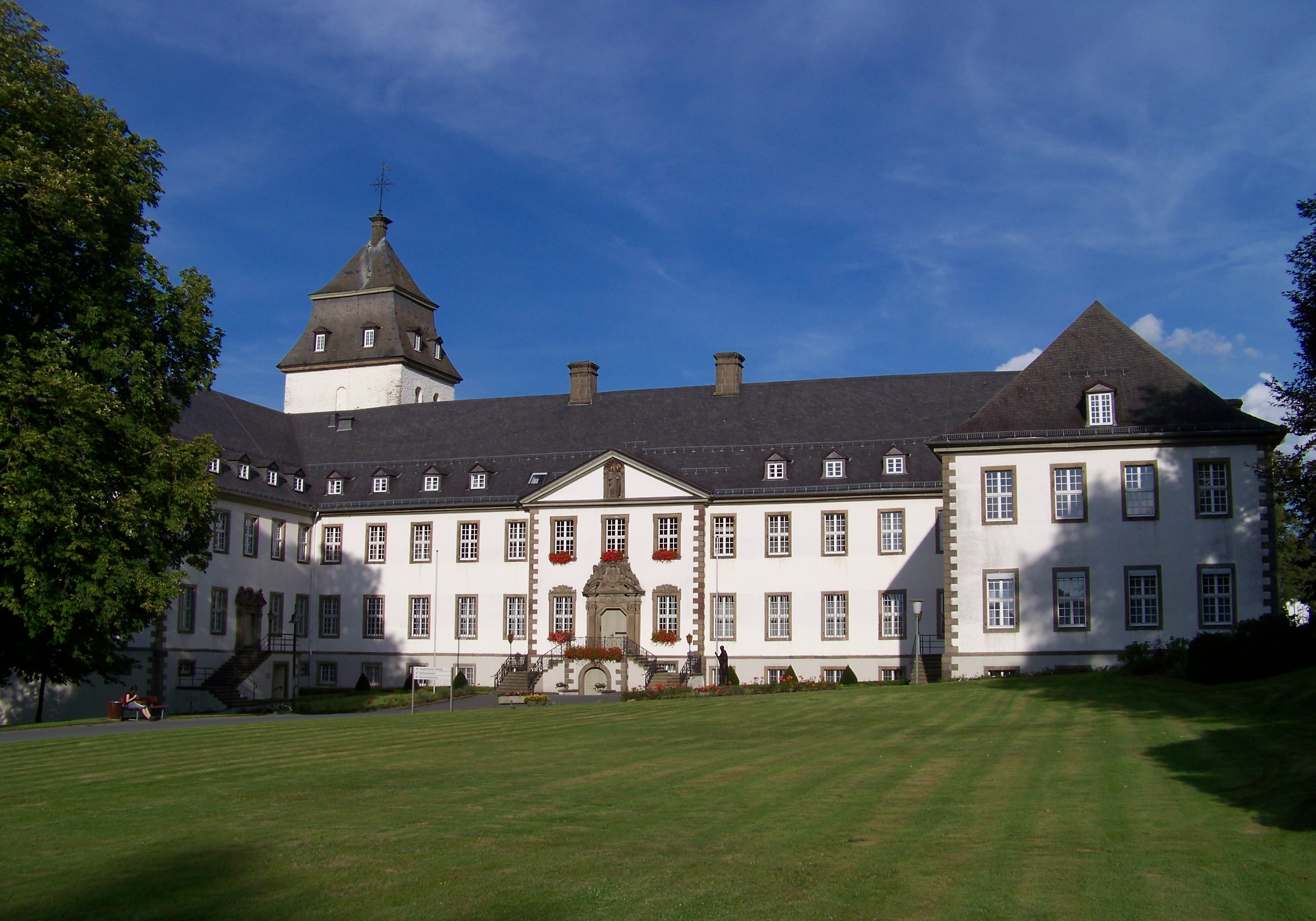
Grafschaft Abbey

Grafschaft Abbey (German: Kloster Grafschaft) is a community of the Sisters of Mercy of Saint Charles Borromeo, formerly a Benedictine monastery, in Schmallenberg-Grafschaft in the Sauerland, North Rhine-Westphalia, Germany.

== First foundation ==
The Benedictine monastery was founded in 1072 on a site at the foot of the Wilzenberg mountain, by Saint Anno, Archbishop of Cologne, whose statue still stands at the west gate. The monastery was dedicated between 1079 and 1089. The original buildings burned down in 1270. From 1729 the premises were gradually replaced by completely new buildings in the Baroque style; the rebuild was finished in 1742 and the new abbey church dedicated in 1747.

The abbey was dissolved in 1804 as a consequence of secularisation. In 1827 the premises were bought by the Princes von Fürstenberg, but by that time the church was in such a bad condition that it had to be demolished, despite its high architectural quality.

== Second foundation ==
In 1947 the buildings were given to the Sisters of Mercy of St. Borromeo, who had been expelled from the order's former mother house Trebnitz Abbey, in Silesia. Grafschaft is now the mother house. This is a nursing order, and a large part of the premises is now used as a hospital. There is also a museum of the abbey's history.
