= Hochsauerlandkreis =

Coordinates: 51°15′N 8°20′E

- District
- Flag Coat of arms
- Country: Germany
- State: North Rhine-Westphalia
- Adm. region: Arnsberg
- Capital: Meschede

Government
  - District admin.: Karl Schneider (CDU)

Area
  - Total: 1,958.71 km^{2} (756.26 sq mi)

Population (31 December 2024)
  - Total: 260,843
  - Density: 133.171/km^{2} (344.911/sq mi)
- Time zone: UTC+01:00 (CET)
  - Summer (DST): UTC+02:00 (CEST)
- Vehicle registration: HSK
- Website: hochsauerlandkreis.de

Hochsauerlandkreis (German pronunciation: [ˈhoːxzaʊɐlantˌkʁaɪs], lit. 'High Sauerland District') is a Kreis (district) in the east of North Rhine-Westphalia, Germany. Neighboring districts are Soest, Paderborn, Höxter, Waldeck-Frankenberg, Siegen-Wittgenstein, Olpe, Märkischer Kreis.

The district is named “High Sauerland” because two of the highest mountains of the Sauerland mountainous landscape, Langenberg and Kahler Asten are in its territory. With 2,766 ft / 843 m (Langenberg) and 2,762 ft / 842 m (Kahler Asten) these are also the highest mountains of North Rhine-Westphalia.

== History ==
The district was established in 1975 in the reorganization of the districts in North Rhine-Westphalia by merging the previous districts Arnsberg, Brilon and Meschede.

== Geography ==
Geographically the district covers a big part of the Sauerland mountains, including the highest and third highest elevation – the Langenberg near Olsberg with 2,766 ft / 843 m, and the better known Kahler Asten with 2,762 ft / 842 m near Winterberg. These are also the two highest mountains of North Rhine-Westphalia.

== Coat of arms ==
The coat of arms was inherited from the former district Arnsberg. It shows the eagle as the symbol of the Earls of Arnsberg. When their county lost independence in 1368 it fell to the bishops of Cologne, thus the sign on the breast of the eagle shows the Cologne cross.

== Towns and municipalities ==
Clickable map of towns and municipalities in the district

Towns
Municipalities
1. Arnsberg (73,897)
2. Brilon (25,644)
3. Hallenberg (4,435)
4. Marsberg (20,110)
5. Medebach (7,876)
6. Meschede (30,358)
7. Olsberg (21,577)
8. Schmallenberg (25,149)
9. Sundern (28,165)
10. Winterberg (12,918)
1. Bestwig (11,446)
2. Eslohe (8,936)

== Town twinnings ==
Hochsauerland is twinned with the following areas:

- West Lothian, Scotland

== Notable persons ==
- Franz Hoffmeister (died 1943), Roman Catholic priest
- Friedrich Merz (born 1955), Leader of the CDU since 2022 and Chancellor of Germany since 2025

== Notable places ==
- Abbey Bergkloster, Bestwig
- Abbey Grafschaft, Schmallenberg
- Abbey Königsmünster, Meschede
