= Arnsberg (region) =

Coordinates: 51°15′N 8°20′E

- Regierungsbezirk
- Map of North Rhine-Westphalia highlighting Arnsberg
- Country: Germany
- State: North Rhine-Westphalia
- Region seat: Arnsberg

Government
  - District President: Heinrich Böckelühr (CDU)

Area
  - Total: 8,002.34 km^{2} (3,089.72 sq mi)

Population (31 December 2025)
  - Total: 3,556,957
  - Density: 444.490/km^{2} (1,151.22/sq mi)

GDP
  - Total: €156.494 billion (2024)
  - Per capita: €43,824 (2024)
- Vehicle registration: AR
- Website: www.bezreg-arnsberg.nrw.de

Arnsberg (German pronunciation: [ˈaʁnsbɛʁk]) is one of the five Regierungsbezirke of North Rhine-Westphalia, Germany, located in the west-central part of the country. It covers the Sauerland hills as well as the east part of the Ruhr area.

The region was founded in 1815 as a subdivision of the Prussian Province of Westphalia.

Kreise
(counties)

1. Ennepe-Ruhr
2. Hochsauerland
3. Märkischer Kreis
4. Olpe
5. Siegen-Wittgenstein
6. Soest
7. Unna

Kreisfreie Städte
(independent cities)

1. Bochum
2. Dortmund
3. Hagen
4. Hamm
5. Herne

== Economy ==
The gross domestic product (GDP) of the region was 124.8 billion € in 2018, accounting for 3.7% of German economic output. GDP per capita adjusted for purchasing power was 32,000 € or 106% of the EU27 average in the same year. The GDP per employee was 95% of the EU average.
