= Bilstein =

Bilstein may refer to:

== People ==
- Counts of Bilstein, Frankish noble family
- Barons of Bilstein, Westphalian noble family

== Inhabited places ==
- Bilstein (Kürten), village near Kürten, county of Rheinisch-Bergischer-Kreis, North Rhine-Westphalia
- Bilstein (Kreuzau), village near Kreuzau, county of Düren, North Rhine-Westphalia
- Bilstein (Lennestadt), town quarter of Lennestadt, county of Olpe, North Rhine-Westphalia
- Bilstein (Limbourg) or Bilstain, town quarter of Limbourg, Province of Liege, Region of Wallonia, Belgium
- Amt Bilstein, former administrative district in Westphalia
- Barony of Bilstein, medieval comital lordship in the area of Eschwege, North Hesse
- Villa Bilstein, Ennepetal, county of Ennepe-Ruhr-Kreis, North Rhine-Westphalia

== Castles ==
- Bilstein Castle (Lennestadt), castle in Lennestadt, Landkreis county of Olpe, North Rhine-Westphalia
- Bilstein Castle (Eschwege), ruined castle near Eschwege, county of Werra-Meißner-Kreis, North Hesse
- Bilstein Castle (Bas-Rhin), ruined castle near Urbeis in the Alsace, department of Bas-Rhin
- Château de Bilstein, ruined castle near Riquewihr in the Alsace, department of Haut-Rhin

== Geological formations ==
- Am Bilstein (Hückeswagen) (284,7 m), near Dürhagen, county of Oberbergischer Kreis, North Rhine-Westphalia
- Bilstein (Brilon Plateau) (620,1 m), on the Brilon Plateau, Hochsauerlandkreis, North Rhine-Westphalia
- Bilstein (Kaufungen Forest) (641,2 m), in the Kaufungen Forest, county of Werra-Meißner, North Hesse
- Bilstein (Langenberge) (ca. 460 m), in the Langenberge, Schwalm-Eder Kreis, North Hesse
- Bilstein (Vogelsberg) (665,5 m), in the Vogelsberg, Vogelsbergkreis, Middle Hesse
- Bilstein Cave, in the municipality of Warstein, county of Soest, North Rhine-Westphalia
- Bilstein (Wolfhagen) (405,1 m), on the Isthaberg near Wolfhagen-Istha, county of Kassel, North Hesse

== Other uses ==
- Bilstein & Siekermann, component manufacturer with head office in Hillesheim
- Ferdinand Bilstein, car supplier with head office in Ennepetal
- ThyssenKrupp Bilstein, shock absorber manufacturer with head office in Ennepetal
- Bilstein-Gruppe, international steel company with head office in Hagen-Hohenlimburg

== See also ==
- Bielstein
- Bildstein
