= Bevergern Castle =

Castle in Germany

- Burg Bevergern
- Bevergern
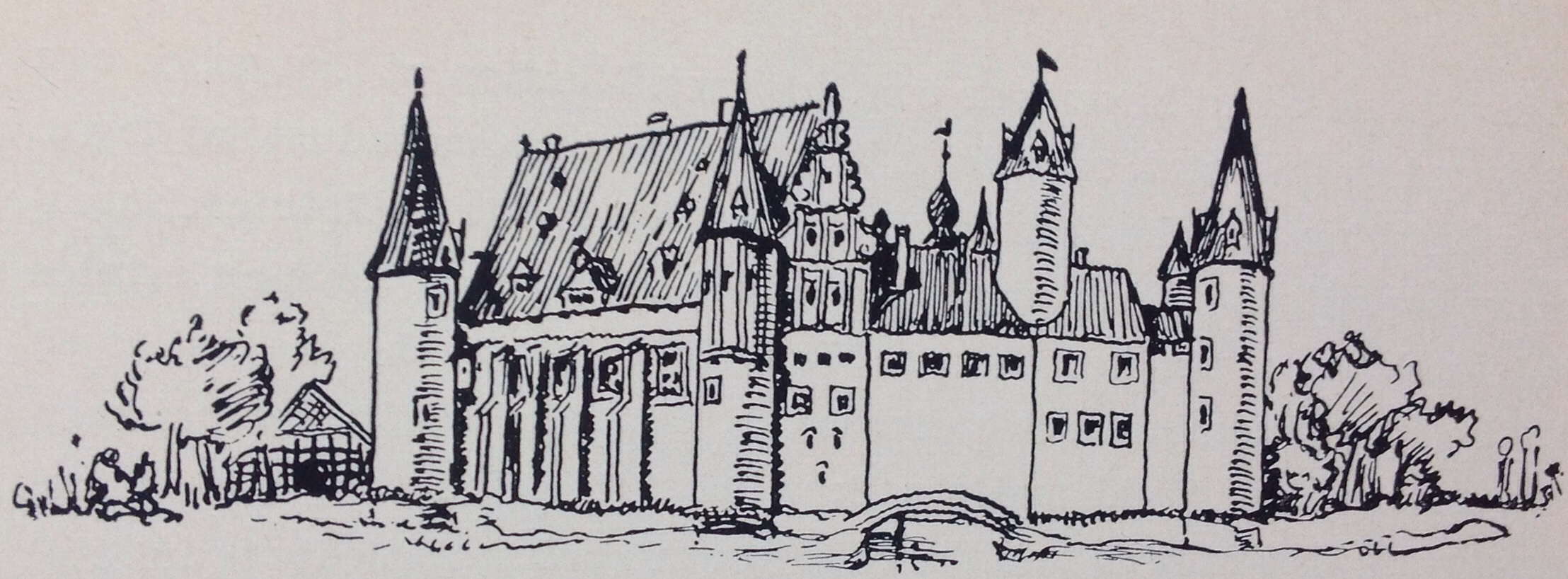

Site information
- Type: Village site
- Code: DE-NW
- Condition: Burgstall, remains re-used

Location
- Coordinates: 52°16′20″N 7°34′52″E

Site history
- Built: c. 1100 or c. 1400

Bevergern Castle (German: Burg Bevergern) is a Burgstall, or a castle of which little remains, in the present centre of the farming village of Bevergern within the borough of Hörstel in the Westphalian region of Tecklenburg Land in the county of Steinfurt. It was blown up in 1680 by Ferdinand II of Fürstenberg, Bishop of Münster.

== History ==
=== Castle ===
There are two theories on the construction of the castle. One states that it was built in the early 12th century by the Bishop of Münster; the other that it was constructed during the 14th century by the Count of Tecklenburg.

On 25 October 1400, the Count of Tecklenburg had to give up Bevergern Castle and parts of his county to the Bishop of Münster. In the ensuing period it changed hands several times.

From December 1535 to January 1536, the Anabaptist, Jan van Leiden, was imprisoned at the castle. He was later executed and his body suspended in a basket on St. Lambert's Church. Other Anabaptists were supposed to have been incarcerated at the castle and hanged in the gallows field between Bevergern and Rodde.

=== Thirty Years' War ===
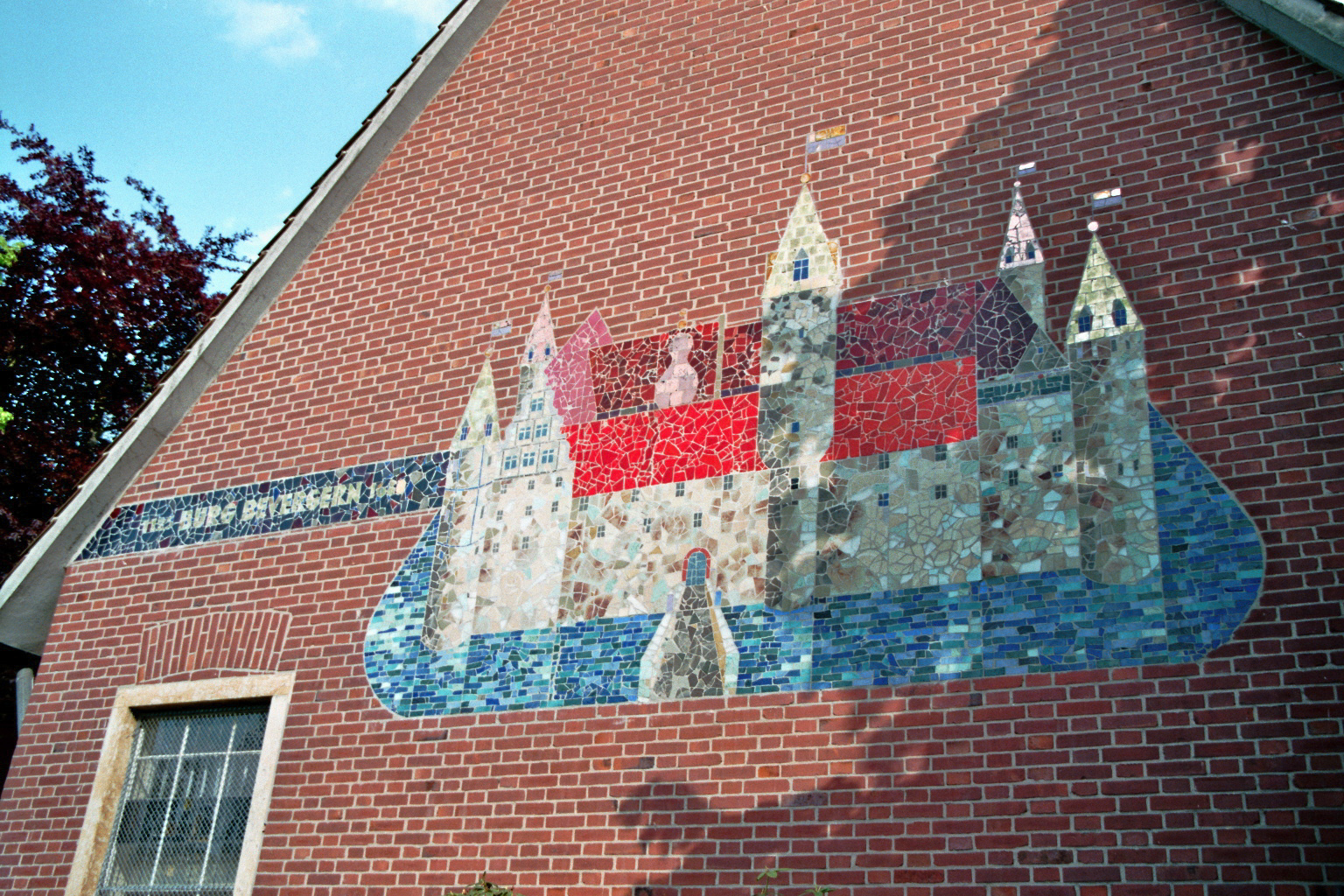
Mosaic of the old Bevergern Castle on the wall of St. Antonius' Primary School in Bevergern

As a result of the Thirty Years' War, the castle went through a more turbulent time. From 1634 to 1652 the castle was possessed by the House of Orange, who wanted thereby to establish their claim to the County of Tecklenburg. In 1637 Bevergern returned briefly into the ownership of the Bishop of Münster. With the end of the war and Peace of Westphalia by Osnabrück and Münster, the castle and village were promised to Münster again. In spite of this decision, the castle continued to be occupied. On 28 August 1652 seven soldiers of the Bishop of Münster captured the castle through a ruse. The Provost of Rheine and his people were camouflaged in hunting dress in the vicinity of the castle, where their allies overcame the guards on the castle. The castle contingent were sent away with their weapons to Lingen. On 15 February 1659 the Bishop of Münster paid the Prince of Orange 120,000 thalers to give up the castle and Bevergern.

In the period 6 to 15 March 1680 the castle was blown up by Bishop Ferdinand II out of concerns that the Dutch could reoccupy it from Lingen. The stones of the castle were used for buildings in the surrounding area. In 1910 remains of the old castle were discovered again during the construction of a house. In the old town, its foundation walls have been uncovered at the surface.
