= Adolf Hennecke =

German politician and Stakhanovite (1905–1975)

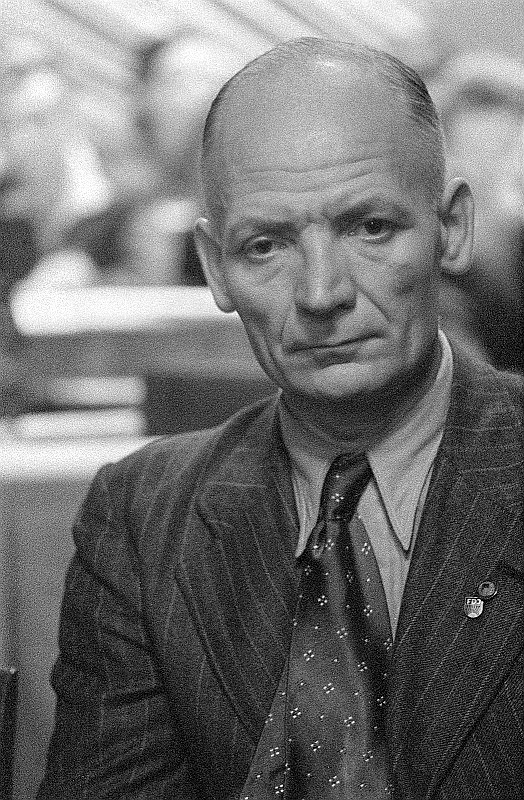
Portrait of Adolf Hennecke, Leipzig 1949

Adolf Hennecke, (25 March 1905 in Meggen (Lennestadt) – 22 February 1975 in East Berlin) was an official of the German FDGB (Freier Deutscher Gewerkschaftsbund) and of the Socialist Unity Party of Germany. He gave his name to the Hennecke movement, the German Democratic Republic's Stakhanovite activist movement.

== Biography ==
Adolf Hennecke was the son of a miner, raised by his uncle after the death of his parents. Between 1919 and 1922 he worked as an apprentice salesman. From 1925, finding himself jobless during Germany's Weimar-era hyperinflation, Hennecke started work as a miner and moved in 1926 to Oelsnitz, Erzgebirge to work in the Saxon coal mines. In 1931, Hennecke joined the Revolutionäre Gewerkschafts-Opposition and, after the Second World War, the Social Democratic Party of Germany. In 1948, given his anti-nazi credentials, he was elected to the Trade Union Management Board and was a member of the Competition Commission of the mining company Steinkohlenwerk Karl Liebknecht, as well as the Board of Directors of the coal industry Union of People's Enterprises, or VVB.

== Awards and rewards ==
Adolf Hennecke, 43, was chosen to initiate a Stakhanovite activist effort in the Soviet occupation zone in imitation of the Soviet movement named after the Soviet miner Alexey Stakhanov. The Lugau-Oelsnitzer coalfield was underperforming, producing less coal in 1948 than in 1938 and 8.8% less than the previous year. The local labor management and party representatives sought to demonstrate that far higher production levels were possible. Hennecke obtained this assignment after the young miner Franz Franik refused to set such a performance record when extracting a layer of coal, fearing the reaction of his colleagues. At first, Hennecke too refused the task (because he was afraid of the reaction of his colleagues to such a norm-breaking effort) but finally he declared himself ready to try for a record performance. On 13 October 1948, the first anniversary of the 1947 implementation of the Soviet Military Administration's Order 234 reorganizing the economy on Soviet principles, Hennecke entered the Karl Liebknecht shaft of the Lugau-Oelsnitzer mine with two fellow SED members and a union representative and extracted in the course of a 13-hour shift more than 24.4 m^{3} (860 cu ft) of coal (instead of the normal 6.3 m^{3} (220 cu ft)) from a layer that Hennecke has prepared the day before. This volume represented 387% of the usual performance standard. As a reward, he received 1.5 kg (3.3 lb) of fat, three boxes of cigarettes, a bottle of brandy, 50 marks, and a bouquet of flowers.

== Hennecke movement ==
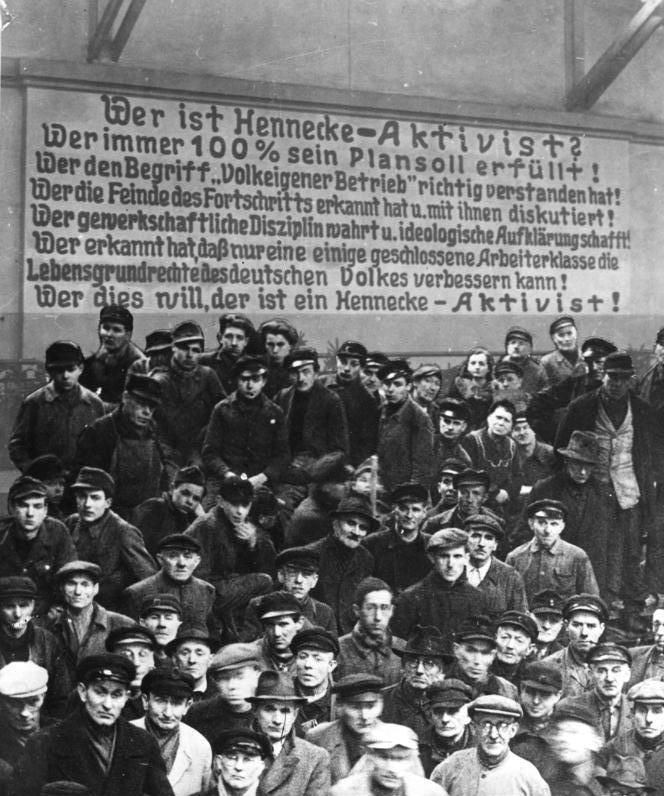
Poster of the Hennecke movement

Adolf Hennecke was held up as an example for workers in the GDR and his record became the trigger for the Hennecke activist movement in which the workers pledged to exceed production standards. The anniversary of Hennecke's mining performance was celebrated annually on 13 October by the Socialist Unity Party of Germany. The first conference of the Hennecke movement took place on 4 and 5 February 1949 in East Berlin in the Staatsoper Berlin opera house. Among the topics of the conference were questions about wage increases and the expansion of the activist movement into a mass movement.

== Later career ==
A year later, in 1949, Adolf Hennecke received the first prize of the National Prize of the German Democratic Republic, with a cash reward of 100,000 marks. In 1950, Hennecke was placed in charge of studies at the Freiberg Mining School, and in October 1950 Hennecke was elected to the Volkskammer.

Later Hennecke became a department head in the State Planning Commission of the GDR and was a member of the central committee of the SED until his death. In 1965 and 1970, he was awarded the GDR's Patriotic Order of Merit and in 1964 the Karl Marx Order. Hennecke was cremated and honoured with burial in the Pergolenweg Ehrengrab section of Berlin's Friedrichsfelde Cemetery.

== Works ==
- with Boleslaw Zagala, Gertrud Tzschoppe (1952). Der Steiger führt [The foreman leads]. Berlin: Kinderbuchverlag.
- with Herbert Deeg (1948). Aktivisten zeigen den Weg ... [Activists show the way]. Berlin: Verlag Die Wirtschaft.
