= Veischede =

River in Germany

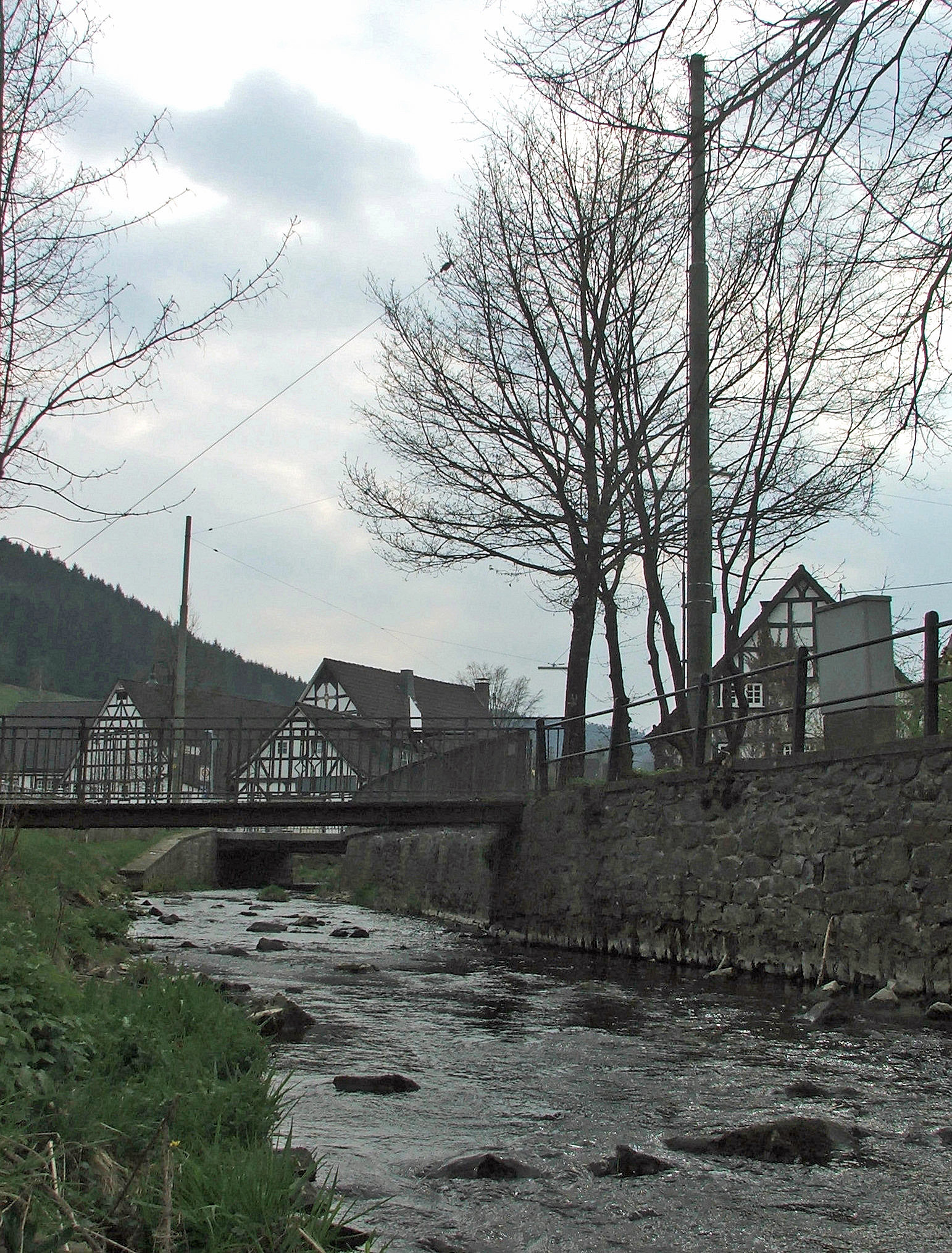

Location
- Country: Germany
- State: North Rhine-Westphalia

Physical characteristics
- Mouth
  - location: Lenne
  - coordinates: 51.1454°N 8.0117°E
- Length: 16.6 km (10.3 mi)

Basin features
- Progression: Lenne→ Ruhr→ Rhine→ North Sea

The Veischede (German pronunciation: [ˈfaɪʃədə]) is a river of North Rhine-Westphalia, Germany. It flows into the Lenne near Grevenbrück.

== See also ==
- List of rivers of North Rhine-Westphalia
