= Ehrengrab =

Grave of honor

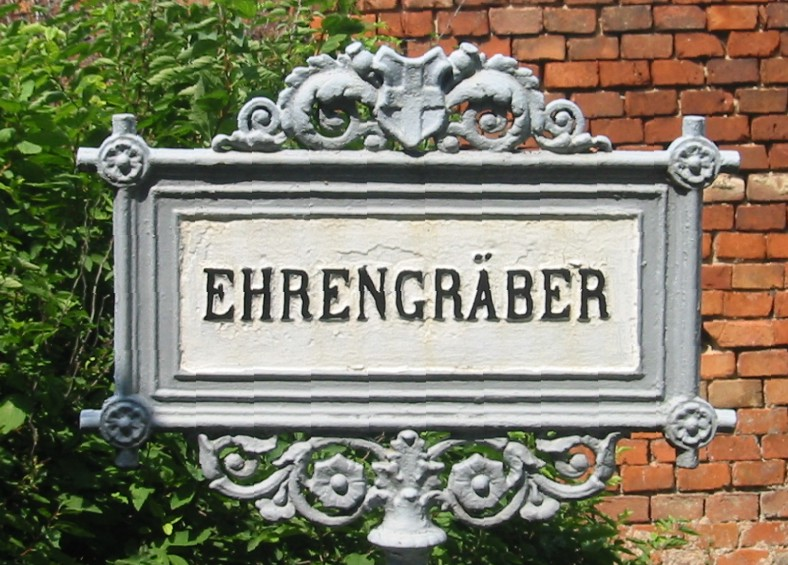
Sign, Zentralfriedhof in Vienna

An Ehrengrab (English: 'grave of honor') is a distinction granted by certain German, Swiss and Austrian cities to some of their citizens for extraordinary services or achievements in their lifetimes. If there are no descendants or institutions to care for the gravesites, the communities or cities will take responsibility for the graves and for financing their care.

Many Ehrengräber (honor graves) also serve to document cultural history; for example, when a cemetery containing artistically notable graves is closed and the graves are moved at public expense.

The basic details of the awarding, financing and care of honorary graves are similarly handled in all German-speaking countries. Berlin and Vienna maintain the largest number of such sites.

== Cities ==
=== Berlin ===
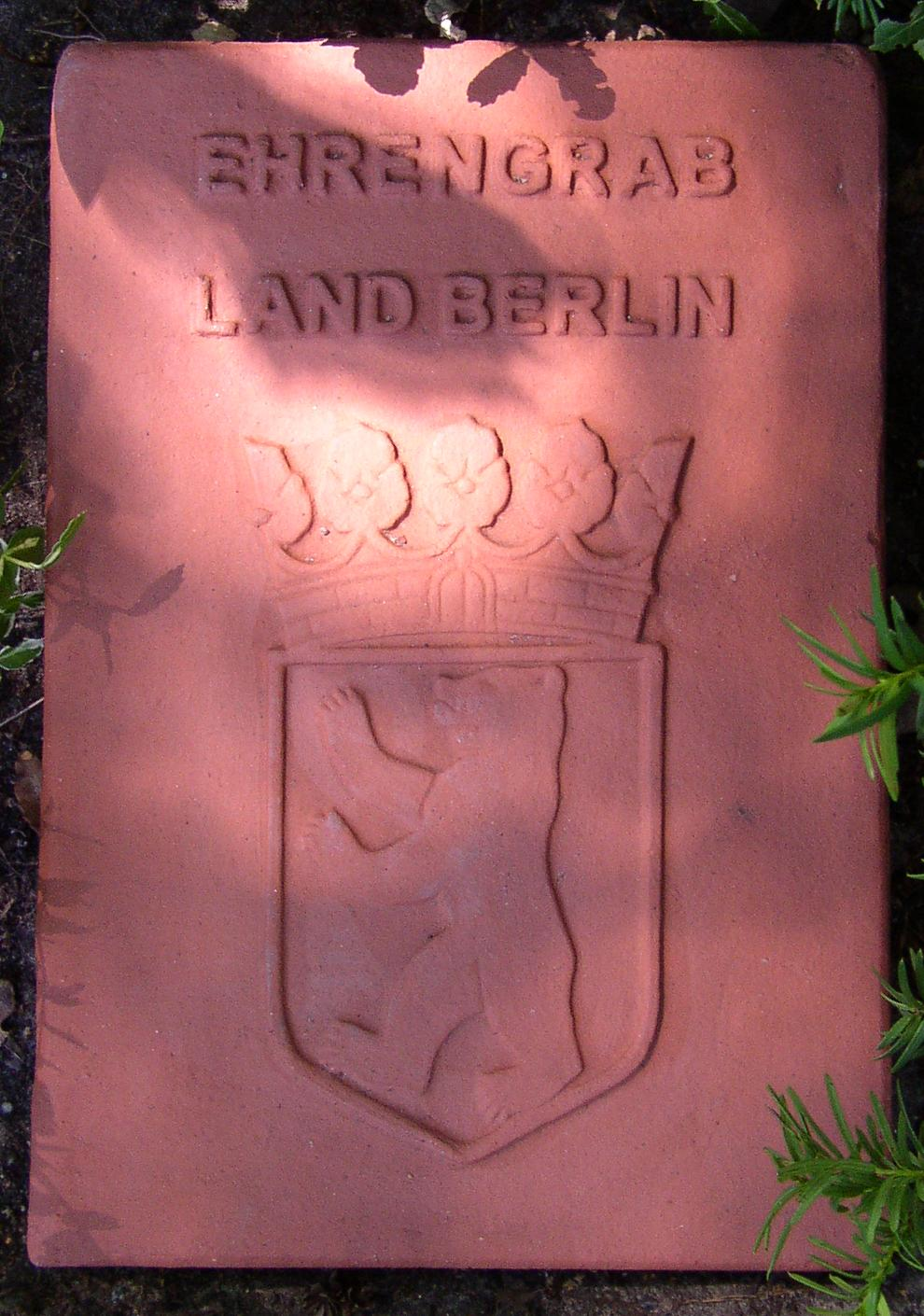
A stone tablet Ehrengrab marker in Berlin

In Berlin about 200 cemeteries contain approximately 740 tombs of honor with about 800 Ehrengräber (some tombs honor several members of the same family). Berlin public memorial graves are under the legislation of the Berlin Senate dating to 1952, labeled as "General Instructions for the recognition, transfer and maintenance ..." regarding tombs subject to benefits. The current basis is §12, Paragraph 6 of the "Law on the state-owned and non-state-owned cemeteries in Berlin" (Cemeteries Act) of 1 November 1995.

As such, Berlin provides at public expense honorary graves, available to:

1. the dead, for whom the federal government or the government of a country has given a state funeral;
2. the deceased, where the honorary title of Stadtältester has been granted to honorees and their spouses; and
3. the deceased who were recipients of honorary pensions or awarded by Berlin for a particular service or have achieved excellence and whose memory lives on in public, as well as their spouses.

Among those who have such tombs of honor in Berlin are Dietrich Bonhoeffer, Bertolt Brecht, Aleksander Brückner, Wilhelm Busch, Theodor Fontane, Valeska Gert, the brothers Grimm, Georg Ludwig Hartig, Heinrich von Kleist, Hildegard Knef, Otto Lilienthal, Herbert Marcuse, Felix Mendelssohn, Marg Moll, Helmut Newton, Ernst Reuter, Joachim Ringelnatz, Heinrich Zille, and Arnold Zweig.

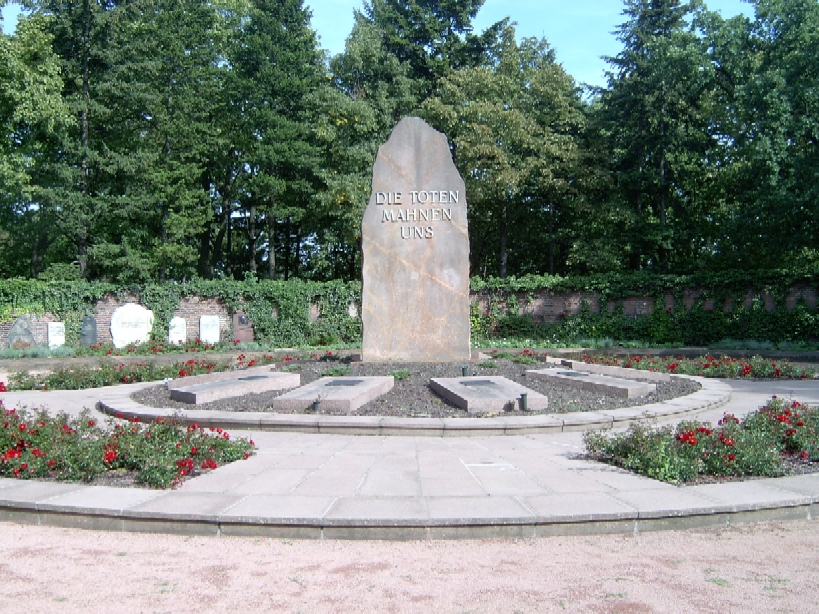
The German Democratic Republic's Memorial to the Socialists at Zentralfriedhof Friedrichsfelde

From 1951 to 1989, the German Democratic Republic used the Memorial to the Socialists (German: Gedenkstätte der Sozialisten) at Zentralfriedhof Friedrichsfelde as central memorial site for East Germany's Socialists, Communists and anti-fascist fighters. Decisions whether a person should be buried in the Memorial to the Socialists or the adjacent Pergolenweg section of the cemetery rested solely with the Politburo of the Socialist Unity Party of Germany, and many honoured this way were also given a state funeral. People buried or commemorated here include Wilhelm Liebknecht, Karl Liebknecht, Rosa Luxemburg, Adolf Hennecke and Klaus Fuchs. Under certain circumstances, relatives of people honoured in the Memorial to the Socialists or the Pergolenweg section can still be buried there; one such example is Markus Wolf (died 2006), whose ashes were placed in the grave of his brother Konrad Wolf, who had been awarded an honorary grave in the Pergolenweg section in 1982.

=== Vienna ===
Graves of honor are called Gewidmete Gräber der Stadt Wien (Dedicated tombs of the City of Vienna). The name Ehrengräber is reserved for tombs in the Central Cemetery of Vienna. To make the cemetery more attractive, famous citizens such as Ludwig van Beethoven and Franz Schubert were exhumed and transferred to the cemetery. Funerary monuments were built for others, such as Wolfgang Amadeus Mozart. Hundreds of graves of honor are found in cemeteries in Vienna.

=== Zurich ===
The city of Zurich maintains an anonymous tomb of honor near the Nordheim crematorium. It is a common tomb for people who have donated their bodies to the Anatomical Institute of the University of Zurich for the needs of science and wished that their urn would be stored there. Some graves originate from the medical faculties of universities in other cities of Switzerland, Germany and Austria, and the maintenance costs for the graves are generally borne by the responsible institutions.

== See also ==
- Category of National cemeteries
- Memorial
