= Irmgart Wessel-Zumloh =

German painter

- Born: 3 August 1907; Grevenbrück, German Empire
- Died: 30 May 1980 (aged 72); Iserlohn, West Germany
- Education: LMU Munich (not completed)

Irmgart Wessel-Zumloh (née Zumloh; 3 August 1907 – 30 May 1980) was a German painter and graphic artist.

== Life ==
After graduating from high school, she began studying law in 1928. She quit in her first year at the Ludwig-Maximilians-Universität München (LMU) off this to study art with Fritz Burmann at the State Art Academy in Königsberg (then Prussia, now Kaliningrad), and later with Georg Tappert at the State Art School in Berlin. In 1932 Irmgart Zumloh passed her state examination for artistic teaching at secondary schools. She married the painter Wilhelm Wessel in 1934 and lived in Hemer, Recklinghausen, and Iserlohn.

After an exhibition in 1933 in the Gustav Lübcke Museum in Hamm, the Wallraf–Richartz Museum Cologne was the first public institution to acquire graphics by Irmgart Wessel-Zumloh in 1934. In the Deutsche Graphikschau Görlitz and in the Wallraf-Richartz Museum Cologne, graphics by Irmgart Wessel-Zumloh were confiscated by the National Socialists as degenerate art. A study visit to Rome lasting several weeks became a key artistic experience. Through her encounter with Italian painting, she turned to oil painting, after having worked mainly with drawings and graphics.

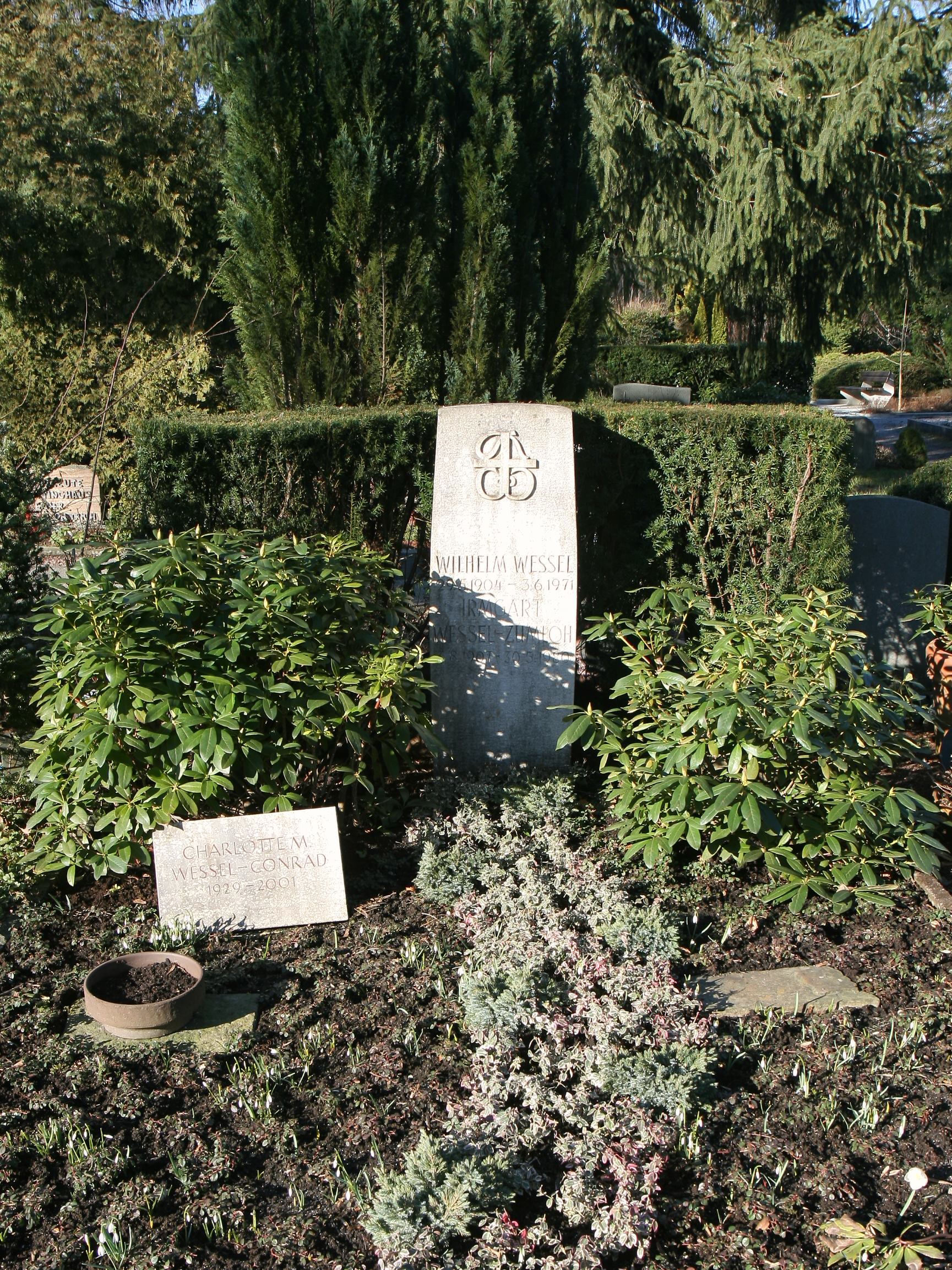
Tomb of the Wessel couple in the Iserlohn main cemetery

In 1946, the Wessel couple co-founded the West German Artists' Association, and Wilhelm Wessel was its chairman from 1952 to 1957. Numerous solo and group exhibitions followed. In 1950 the Wessels traveled to the XXV Venice Biennale and saw the spectacular performance of Jackson Pollock. In 1957 Irmgart Wessel-Zumloh became a member of the Deutscher Künstlerbund (Association of German Artists), and from 1961 to 1967 she was on the board.

In the volume Wegzeichen im Unbekannten – Neunzehn deutsche Maler zu Fragen der zeitgenössischen Kunst (Nineteen German Painters on Issues of Contemporary Art), published by Wolfgang Rothe in Heidelberg in 1962, Irmgart Wessel-Zumloh was the only woman represented.

John Anthony Thwaites, one of the leading art critics of the 1950s and 1960s, described Irmgart Wessel-Zumloh as one of the leading German artists of the time.

== Exhibitions ==
- Municipal Gustav Lübcke Museum, Hamm 1933 and 1958
- Stedelijk Museum, Amsterdam 1954 (group exhibition)
- X. Premio Lissone, Italy 1957 (group exhibition)
- Blauer Saal, Soest 1957
- Osthaus Museum, Hagen 1958 and 1961
- Galerie Parnass, Wuppertal 1960
- Museum Ostwall, Dortmund 1967
- Städtisches Suermondt Museum, Aachen 1971
- Westfälisches Landesmuseum für Kunst und Kulturgeschichte, Münster 1966 and 1999
- Märkisches Museum, Witten 1957 and 1971
- Von der Heydt-Museum, Wuppertal 1970
- Wilhelm-Morgner-Haus, Soest 1975 and 1985
- Galerie Schübbe, Düsseldorf 1981
- Villa Wessel in Iserlohn, Ausstellungen 1991, 1992, 1995, 1996, 1997, 1998, 2007, 2014 and 2017
- Kunstsammlung Gera 2000

Irmgart took part in further international exhibitions in Salzburg, Madrid, Paris, Barcelona, Lille, Bruges, Buenos Aires, Montevideo, and Venice as well as in the US and New Zealand. Between 1953 and 1980 Irmgart Wessel-Zumloh took part in a total of 25 annual exhibitions of the German Association of Artists.

In addition, she participated numerous times in the exhibitions of the West German Artists Association after 1950, the Ruhr-Lenne Association, the Hanover Art Association and the Darmstadt Secession.

== Awards ==
- 1952 Karl-Ernst-Osthaus-Preis from the city of Hagen
- 1953 Industriepreis from the city of Iserlohn
- 1957 Wilhelm-Morgner-Preis from the city of Soest
- 1966 Konrad-von-Soest-Preis from the Westphalia-Lippe Regional Association (as the first woman)

== Estate ==
In Iserlohn the Villa Wessel is home to the "Wilhelm Wessel / Irmgart Wessel Zumloh e. V. " art association. The association has set itself the task of processing and maintaining the artistic legacy of the Wessel couple. There are also exhibitions from classical modernism to contemporary, with a focus on early post-war art and thus the artistic environment of the Wessels.
