= Amt Bilstein =

Defunct German administrative district

Coordinates: 51.0949°N 8.01894°E

- 15th century–1969
- Coat of arms
- Status: Amt
- Capital: Bilstein
- Government: Subdivision
- History
  - Established: 15th century
  - First mentioned as subdivision of Duchy of Westphalia: 1434
  - Secularised to Hesse-Darmstadt: 1803
  - to Prussia (Province of Westphalia): 1816
  - Disestablished: 1969

Amt Bilstein was an administrative district in what is now the region of Westphalia, Germany. Its territory corresponded more or less with the current municipality of Lennestadt. It was first mentioned in 1434 ("Johan van dem Broike, Amtmann zu Bylstein" = "John of the Broike, Bailiff of Bylstein") and, until 1803, was part of the Duchy of Westphalia and thus the Electorate of Cologne, before it was transferred to the Landgraviate of Hesse-Darmstadt, from which, in 1806 the Grand Duchy of Hesse emerged. Following a ruling by the Congress of Vienna this association came to an end and, on 1 August 1816, the territory of the Amt became part of the newly formed Regierungsbezirk Arnsberg in the Prussian Province of Westphalia. It became a subdivision of the Kreis Olpe. The Amt was disbanded in 1969.

== Literature ==
- Günter Becker und Hans Mieles: Bilstein - Land, Burg und Ort - Beiträge zur Geschichte des Raumes Lennestadt und der ehemaligen Herrschaft Bilstein, Im Auftrag der Stadt Lennestadt zusammengestellt von Günther Becker, Lennestadt, 1975.
