= Bilstein (Kaufungen Forest) =

Mountain in Germany

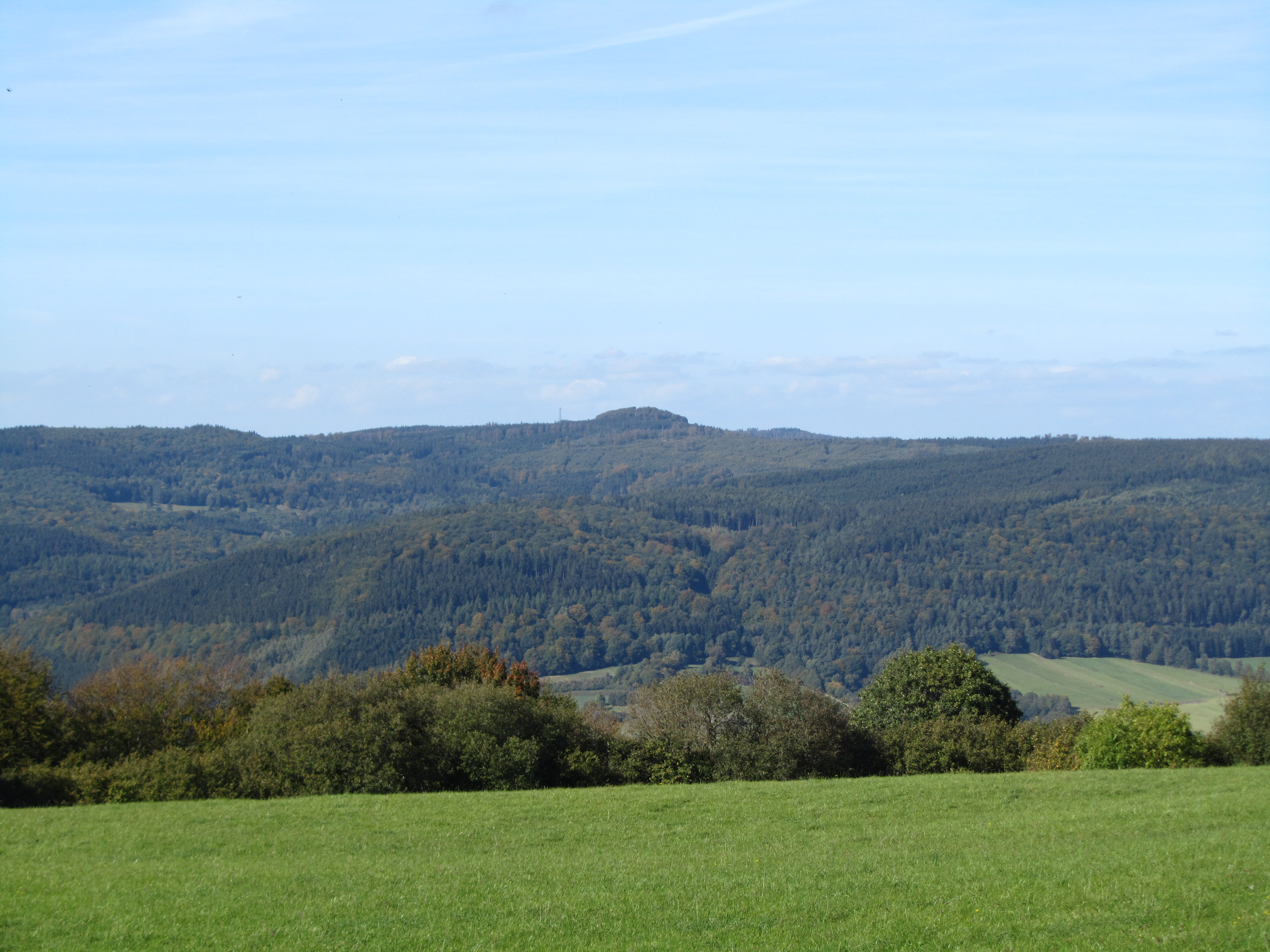

Highest point
- Elevation: 641.2 m (2,104 ft)
- Prominence: 189 m (620 ft)
- Coordinates: 51°17′07″N 9°47′14″E

Geography
- Location: Hesse, Germany
- Parent range: Kaufungen Forest

Bilstein is a 641 m (2,103 ft) high mountain of northern Hesse, Germany. It is the second highest point of the Kaufungen Forest.
