= Am Bilstein (Hückeswagen) =

Coordinates: 51°10′41″N 7°18′24″E

Am Bilstein is the name of an area of open land and prominent viewing point in the borough of Hückeswagen, county of Oberbergischer Kreis, in North Rhine-Westphalia, Germany.

== Location ==
The place lies today immediately next to the Wupper Reservoir. Its neighbouring villages are Dürhagen, Hammerstein and Voßhagen. The place may be reached today on the A 7 path, from which a small side path branches off (signed). There is a viewing point protected by railings with a panoramic view of the reservoir. Before the construction of the dam there were also views of the village of Dörpe.
