= Bilstein Castle (Lennestadt) =

- Burg Bilstein
- Lennestadt-Bilstein
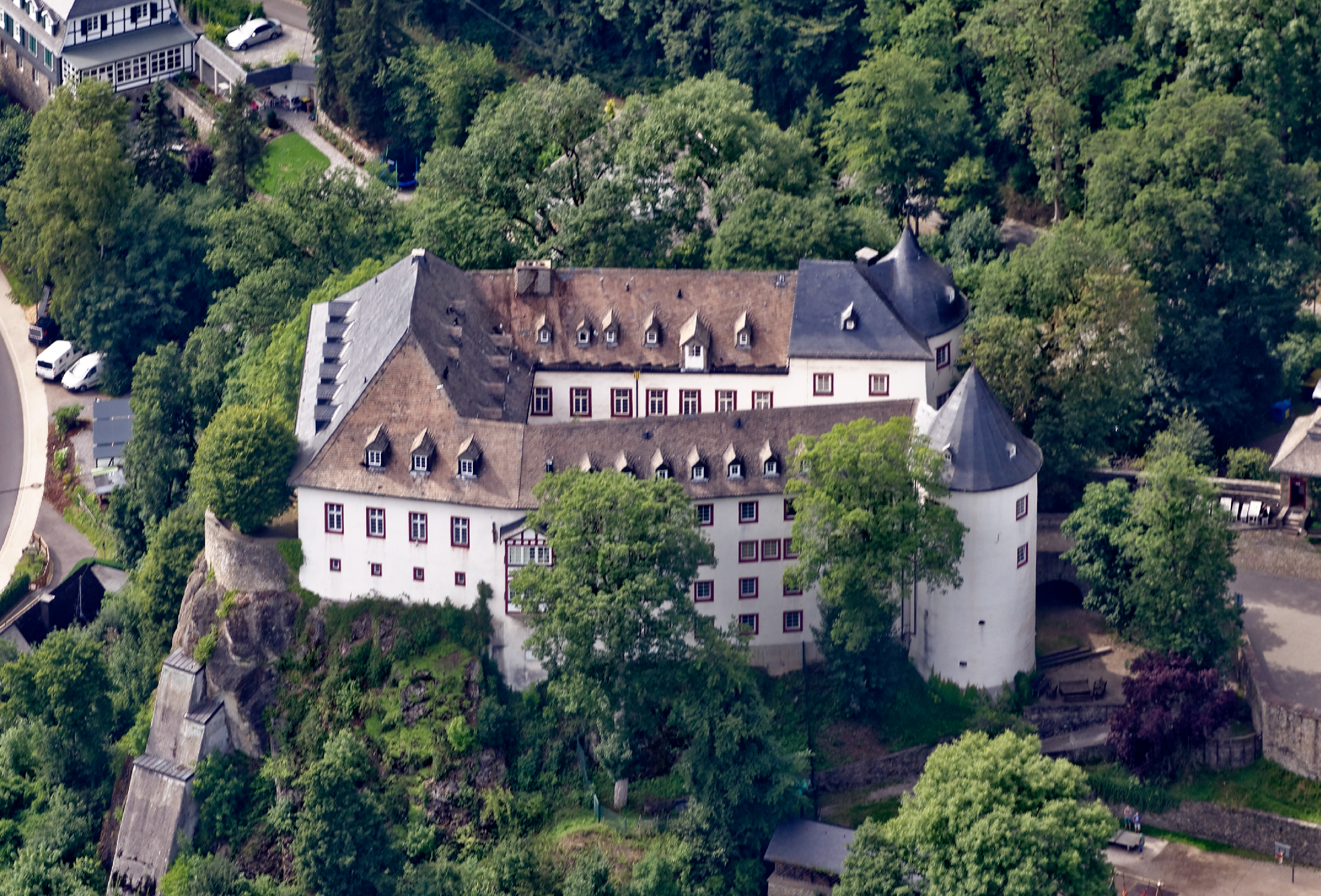
- Aerial photograph of the castle

Site information
- Type: hill castle, spur castle
- Condition: preserved

Location
- Coordinates: 51°05′46″N 8°01′10″E

Site history
- Built: 1202 to 1225

Garrison information
- Occupants: nobility

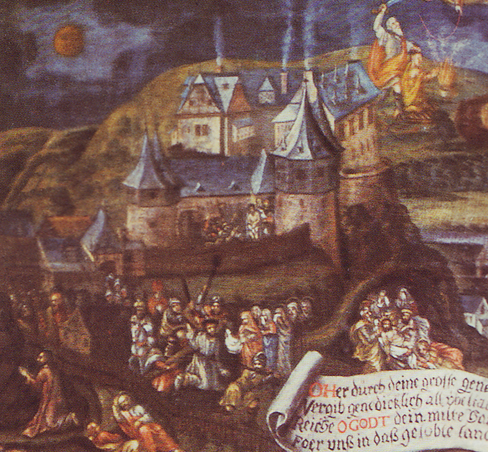
Oldest illustration of Bilstein Castle, dating to 1561

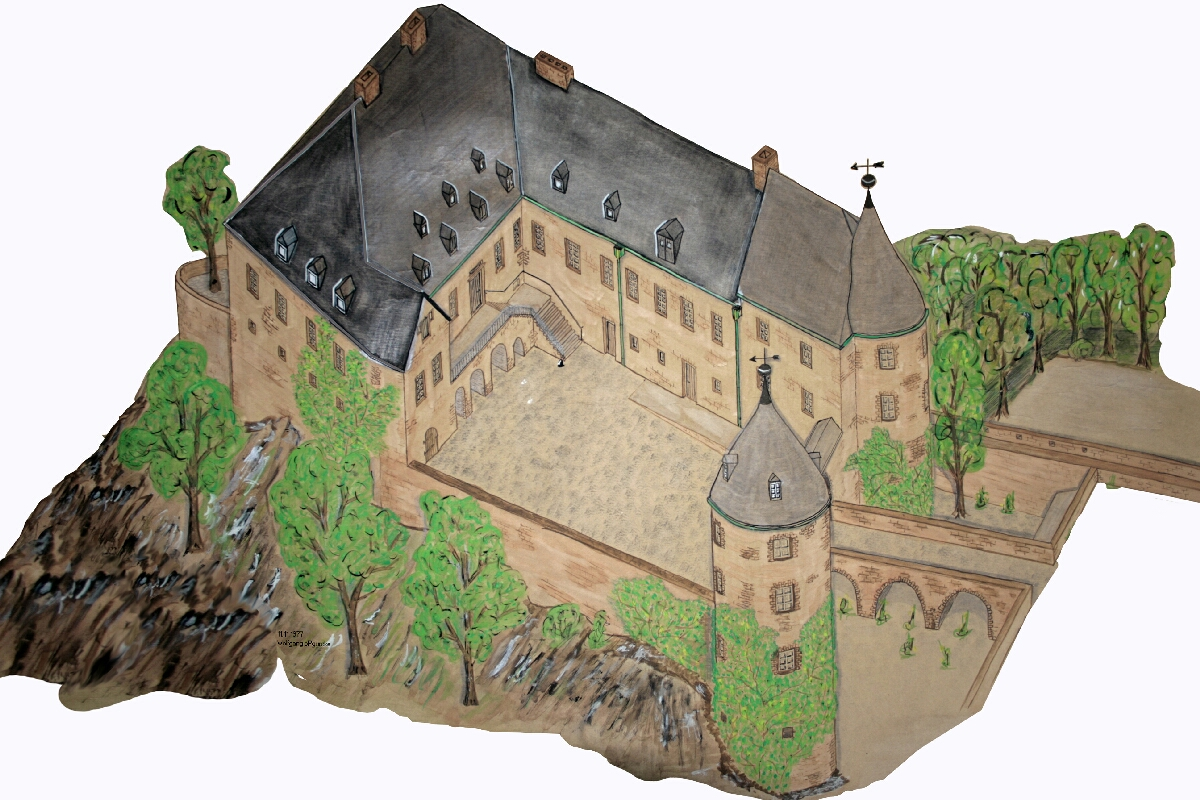
Artist's impression of Bilstein Castle before the expansion of 1977 based on as-completed drawings

Bilstein Castle (German: Burg Bilstein) is a hill castle in the Sauerland in Germany. It is located in the eponymous quarter of Bilstein in the town of Lennestadt. Since 1927 the building has been a youth hostel.

== Origin of the name ==
The word Bilstein (and linguistically related terms such as Beilstein, Bielstein etc.) is not uncommon as a field and place name. According to Förstemann, it means something like "a steeply towering or prominent rock". This description certainly applies to the promontory of Bilstein's castle hill. Thus, presumably the name was transferred from the hill, which is made of keratophyre (green volcanic rock), to the castle and adjacent settlement. Other explanations relate the name to a hunting place, an idol or the Old High German word billi for "sword".

== Castle site ==
Bilstein is a spur castle on an extension of the nearby hill of Rosenberg. This hill spur falls away steeply on three sides so that the castle's defences only needed to be oriented towards the hill to the northeast. The appearance of the castle is thus dominated by its two round towers, each with a diameter of about eight metres: the Chapel Tower in the northwest and the Hohnekamp Tower in the southeast. The towers are connected by a tunnel under the castle courtyard, above ground is a 20th century archway.

The northwestern wing of the main ward and the central block in the southwest are historical structures. By contrast, the wing in the southeast was built in 1978 to expand the hostel. On the valley side of the central block is a portal terrace (Söller) on which a prominent lime tree is growing.

Today a brick bridge spans the moat between the inner and outer baileys. The moat has been partly filled-in and is about 15 metres wide. The outer bailey comprises three buildings, which are referred to as the gatehouse, timber-framed house and festival hall.

== Literature ==
- Günther Becker und Hans Mieles: Bilstein – Land, Burg und Ort. Book celebrating the 750th anniversary of Bilstein Castle, Lennestadt, 1975.
- Günther Becker: Führer durch Bilstein und Umgebung, Verkehrsverein Bilstein-Kirchveischede e.V., 1968.
- Günther Becker: Wanderführer Jugendherberge Bilstein, Jugendherbergswerk Westfalen-Lippe, Hagen, 1968.
- Herbert Evers: Bilstein und seine Umgebung, F. X. Rügenberg, Olpe, 1950.
- Albert Kleffmann: Festbuch zur Siebenhundertjahrfeier der Schlossfreiheit u. Herrschaft Bilstein – Westfalen, 1925, published by order of the festival committee, Bilstein, 1925.
- Uwe Lobbedey: Burg Bilstein (Westfälische Kunststätten, Issue 19), Münster, 1982
- Christiane Mirgel: Jugendburg Bilstein 1947–1954 – Der Weg in die Demokratie, Herausgeber: der Oberkreisdirektor des Kreises Olpe, Kreisarchiv, Olpe, 1992, ISSN 0177-8153.
