= Lennestadt =

- Town
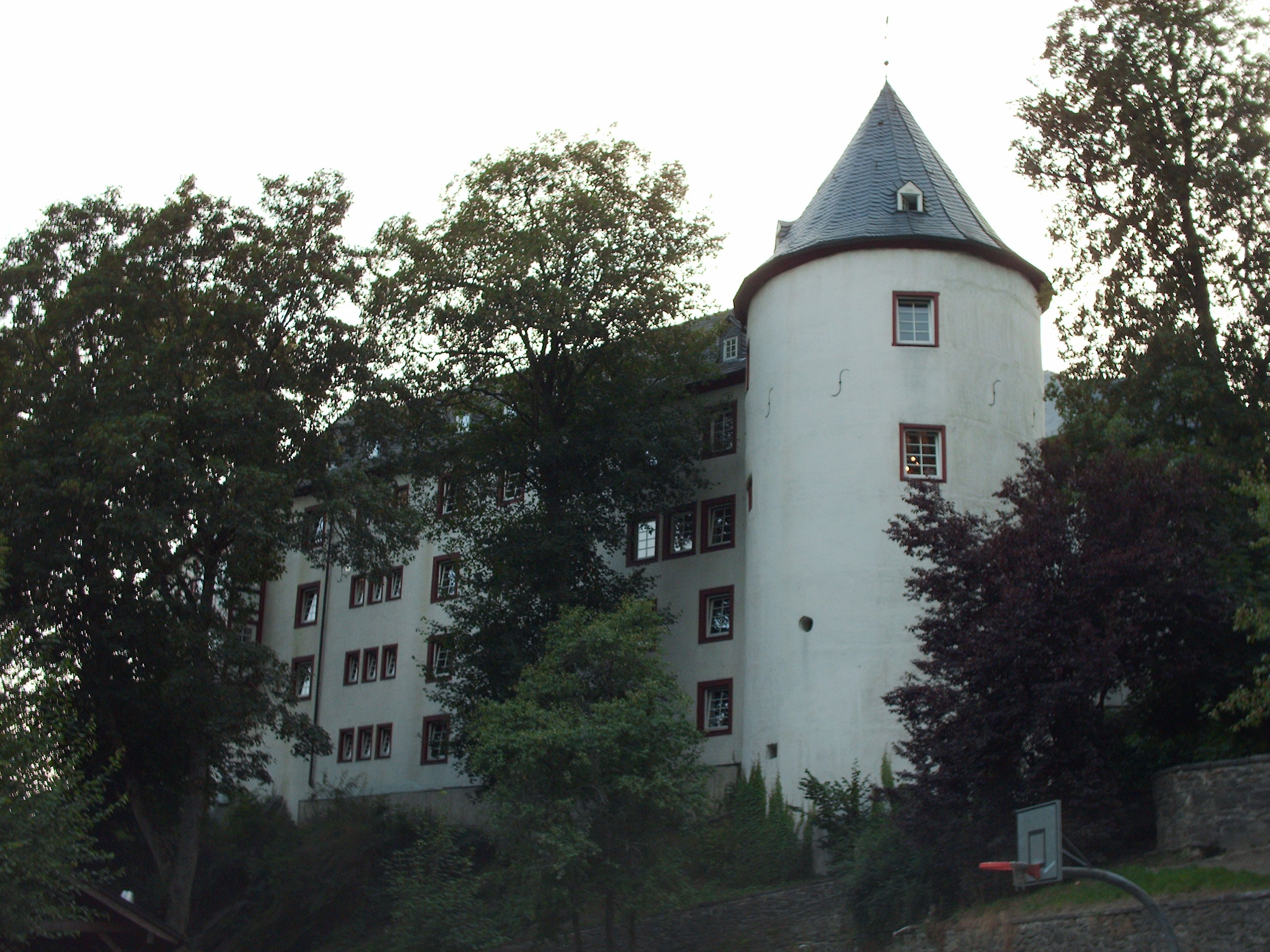
- Bilstein Castle

- Coat of arms

- Location of Lennestadt within Olpe district
- Interactive map of Lennestadt
- Location within Germany Location within North Rhine-Westphalia
- Coordinates: 51°7′25″N 8°4′5″E
- Country: Germany
- State: North Rhine-Westphalia
- Admin. region: Arnsberg
- District: Olpe
- Subdivisions: 48

Government
  - Mayor (2020–25): Tobias Puspas (CDU)

Area
  - Total: 135.59 km^{2} (52.35 sq mi)
- Elevation: 410 m (1,350 ft)

Population (2025-12-31)
  - Total: 24,025
  - Density: 177.19/km^{2} (458.92/sq mi)
- Time zone: UTC+01:00 (CET)
  - Summer (DST): UTC+02:00 (CEST)
- Postal codes: 57368
- Dialling codes: 02721, 02723, 02972 u. 02725
- Vehicle registration: OE
- Website: www.lennestadt.de

Lennestadt (German pronunciation: [ˈlɛnəʃtat], lit. 'Lenne Town'; occasionally also die Lennestadt) lies in the Sauerland in southeast North Rhine-Westphalia and is a municipality in Olpe district. It is the district's most populous municipality. Lennestadt itself is not an actual town but a municipality which comprises several towns and villages.

== Geography ==
Lennestadt lies at the common point of the Ebbegebirge (in the west), Homert and Rothaargebirge (in the east) Nature Parks and is crossed by the river Lenne, a tributary to the Ruhr. Besides the Hundem, which empties into the Lenne in the outlying centre of Altenhundem, the Veischede also feeds this river, near Grevenbrück.

Lennestadt's position is 51° 03' to 51° 12' N, 7° 58' to 8° 15' E. The town's highest point is the Härdler (756 m), and its lowest is on the Lenne near Borghausen (239 m).

=== Neighbouring municipalities ===
Lennestadt borders in the north on the municipalities of Eslohe and Finnentrop, in the east on Schmallenberg and Bad Berleburg, in the south on Kirchhundem, and in the west on the towns of Attendorn and Olpe.

=== Constituent municipalities ===
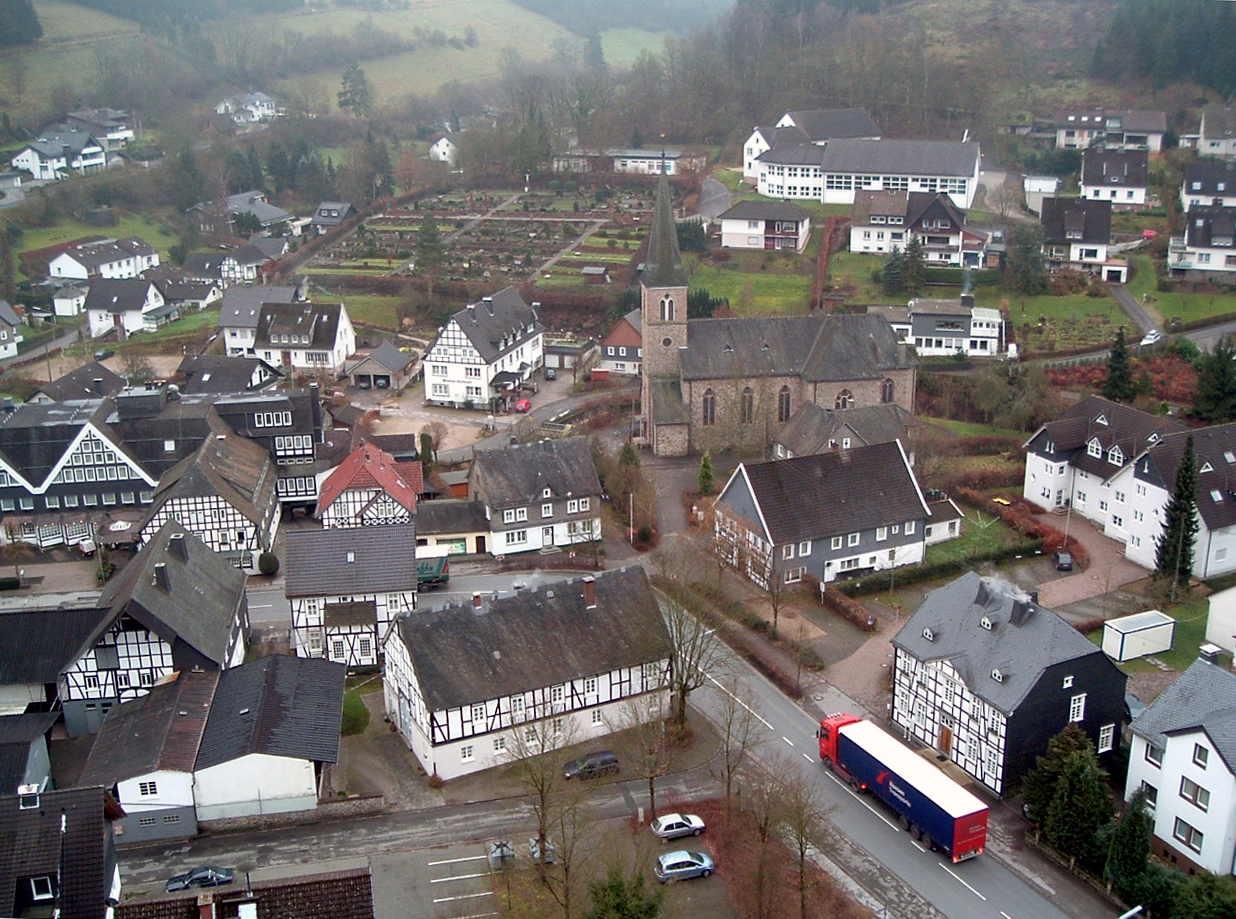
View over Bilstein from the castle

municipalities of Lennestadt

Within Lennestadt's municipal area lie the following centres:

Altenhundem, Altenvalbert, Bilstein, Bonzel, Bonzelerhammer, Brenschede, Bruchhausen, Burbecke, Elspe, Elsperhusen, Einsiedelei, Germaniahütte, Gleierbrück, Grevenbrück, Habbecke, Hachen, Haus Hilmecke, Haus Valbert, Halberbracht, Hengstebeck, Hespecke, Kickenbach, Kirchveischede, Kracht, Langenei, Maumke, Meggen, Melbecke, Milchenbach, Oberelspe, Obermelbecke, Obervalbert, Oedingen, Oedingermühle, Oedingerberg (formerly Berge), Saalhausen, Sporke, Stöppel, Theten, and Trockenbrück.

The fact that there is not a physical town of Lennestadt, but that Lennestadt is an aggregation of the smaller towns listed above, often leads to confusion among visitors.

== History ==
The town of Lennestadt was founded on 1 July 1969 as legal successor to the Amt of Bilstein out of seven former municipalities and outlying centres.

The earliest traces of settlers in the current municipal area date to the Early Middle Ages. The centres of Elspe and Oedingen were first mentioned in a document in 1000 that Emperor Otto III had issued. This makes them the oldest places in Olpe district.

In the 19th century, parts of the current town area were characterized by mining, ironworking and metalworking.

=== Amalgamations ===
In 1975, Milchenbach was joined with Lennestadt. It had formerly belonged to the municipality of Lenne (now part of Schmallenberg).

=== Population development ===
Historical population

Year	Pop.	±% p.a.
1965	26,144	—
1970	26,178	+0.03%
1975	26,170	−0.01%
1980	25,995	−0.13%
1985	26,022	+0.02%
1990	26,468	+0.34%
1995	27,650	+0.88%

Year	Pop.	±% p.a.
2000	28,026	+0.27%
2005	27,831	−0.14%
2010	27,115	−0.52%
2015	26,073	−0.78%
2020	25,140	−0.73%
2025	24,025	−0.90%

Source: Landesdatabank Nordrhein-Westfalen

== Politics ==
=== Town council ===
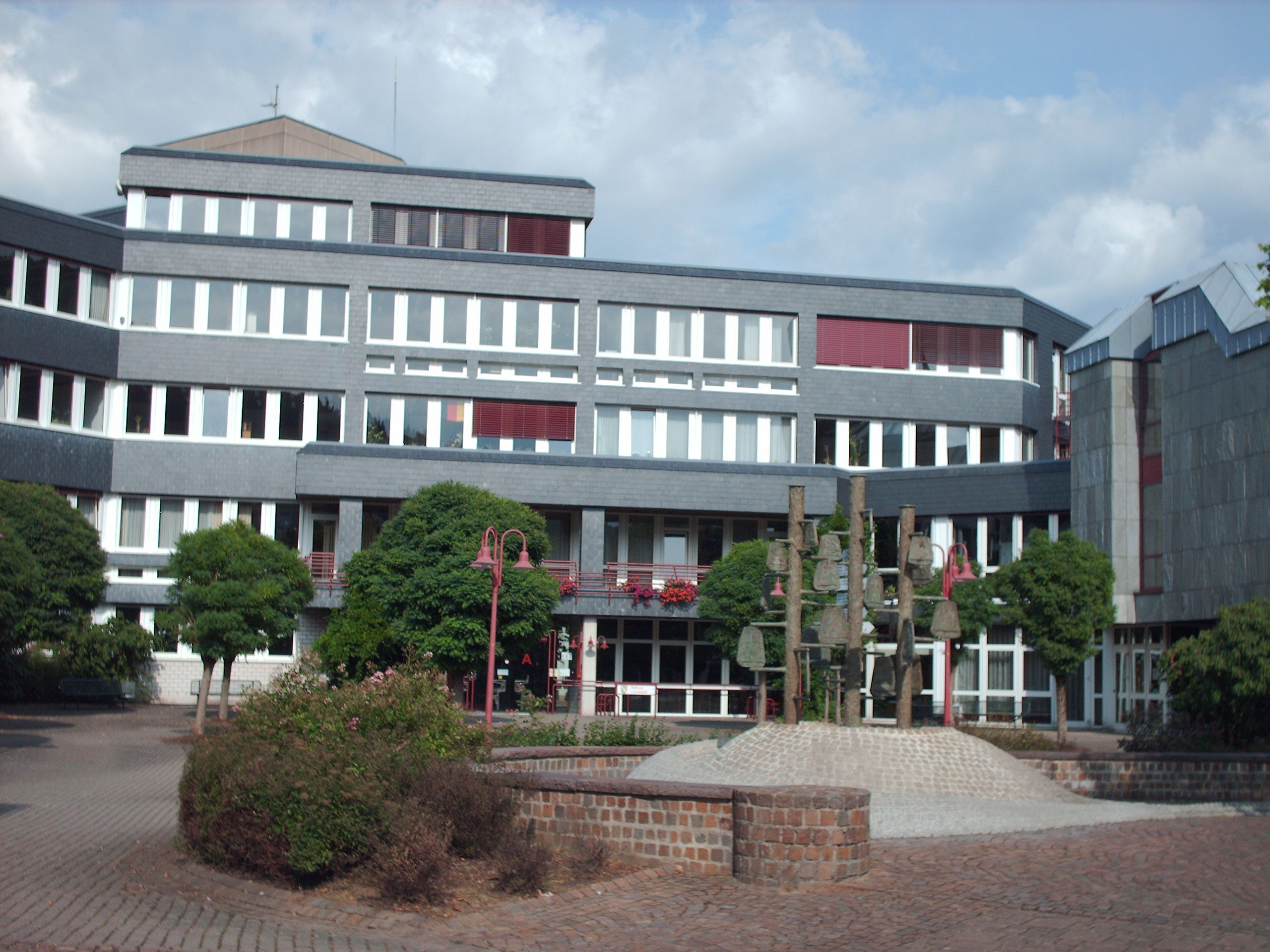
Town Hall

Municipal election results, 25 May 2014
Party	Votes	± as against 2009	Seats
CDU	50.6%	-9.0%	20
SPD	30.5%	+2.4%	11
Grüne	10.9%	-0.2%	4
Free Voters	7.1%	+7.1%	3
Other	0.9%	-0.3%	-

=== Mayor ===
Until 1997, Lennestadt's chief administrator bore the title Stadtdirektor (“Town Director”). The Bürgermeister, or Mayor, was an honorary office and was mainly ceremonial. The current mayor is Tobias Puspas, of the CDU.

Time in office	Chief administrator	Honorary mayor (until 1997)
July 1969 to November 1969	Erwin Krollmann (CDU), Commissioner for the Fulfilment of the Town Director’s Duties	Heinrich Hanfland (CDU), Commissioner for the Fulfilment of the Council Chairman’s Duties
December 1969 – 1989	Erwin Krollmann (CDU)	1969–1983: Josef Beckmann (CDU), Namesake of Bürgermeister-Beckmann-Platz; 1983–1989: Wilhelm „Willi“ Soemer (CDU)
1989–1997	Dr. Franz-Josef Kaufmann (SPD)	Hubert Nies (CDU)
1997–2009	Alfons Heimes (CDU)	
2009–2020	Stefan Hundt (CDU)	
2020–incumbent	Tobias Puspas (CDU)	

=== National and regional elections ===
Party	2009 election	2013 election	2010 state election	2012 state election
CDU	42.3%	47.7%	46.2%	37.7%
SPD	27.2%	31.3%	32.0%	37.6%
FDP	13.5%	4.5%	5.4%	6.6%
Grüne	6.4%	4.2%	7.6%	4.8%
Linke	6.5%	4.3%	4.1%	1.6%
AfD	-	3.9%		
Pirate Party	-	-	0.8%	6.2%
Other	4.1%	4.1%	3.9%	3.5%

=== Coat of arms ===
Lennestadt's arms

The town's arms were conferred on 31 December 1971. The gold and green bars in the background were taken from the arms formerly borne by the Amt of Bilstein. The wavy bend stands for the river Lenne, the town's namesake, and the rose comes from the outlying centre of Oedingen.

=== Town patron ===
Town council decided in 1995 to name Sir Thomas More as the town's patron. Since 2001, the town has been awarding the Thomas-Morus-Preis to citizens “who in their acts have let themselves be led by the convictions of their conscience and who without regard to possible personal disadvantages through bravery and moral courage have thereby become examples to the good of others and our society.”

== Twin towns – sister cities ==
Lennestadt is twinned with:

- Otwock, Poland (1992)
- Çaycuma, Türkiye

== Culture and sightseeing ==
=== Theatre ===
The Kulturgemeinde Hundem-Lenne, founded in 1946, offers a cultural programme in the Pädagogisches Zentrum (PZ, “Educational Centre”), a venue with 480 seats at the Anne-Frank-Hauptschule in Meggen.

=== Museum ===
In Grevenbrück is found the town museum, the Museum der Stadt Lennestadt in whose building the town's homeland and regional studies library and the town archive are also to be found.

Since 1998, the Förderverein Bergbaudenkmäler Lennestadt (“Lennestadt Mining Monument Development Association”) has run the Bergbaumuseum Siciliaschacht (“Sicilia Mineshaft Mining Museum”) in Meggen, which recalls the town's mining tradition.

=== Buildings ===
Among well known buildings in Lennestadt are Bilstein Castle (Burg Bilstein), the Peperburg castle ruins, many timber frame houses, the so-called Sauerlandpyramiden, the Sicilia Mineshaft and the Hohe Bracht viewing tower. On Bundesstraße 55 between Oedingen and Eslohe, the Madonna der Straße (“Madonna of the Road”) roadside shrine is to be found.

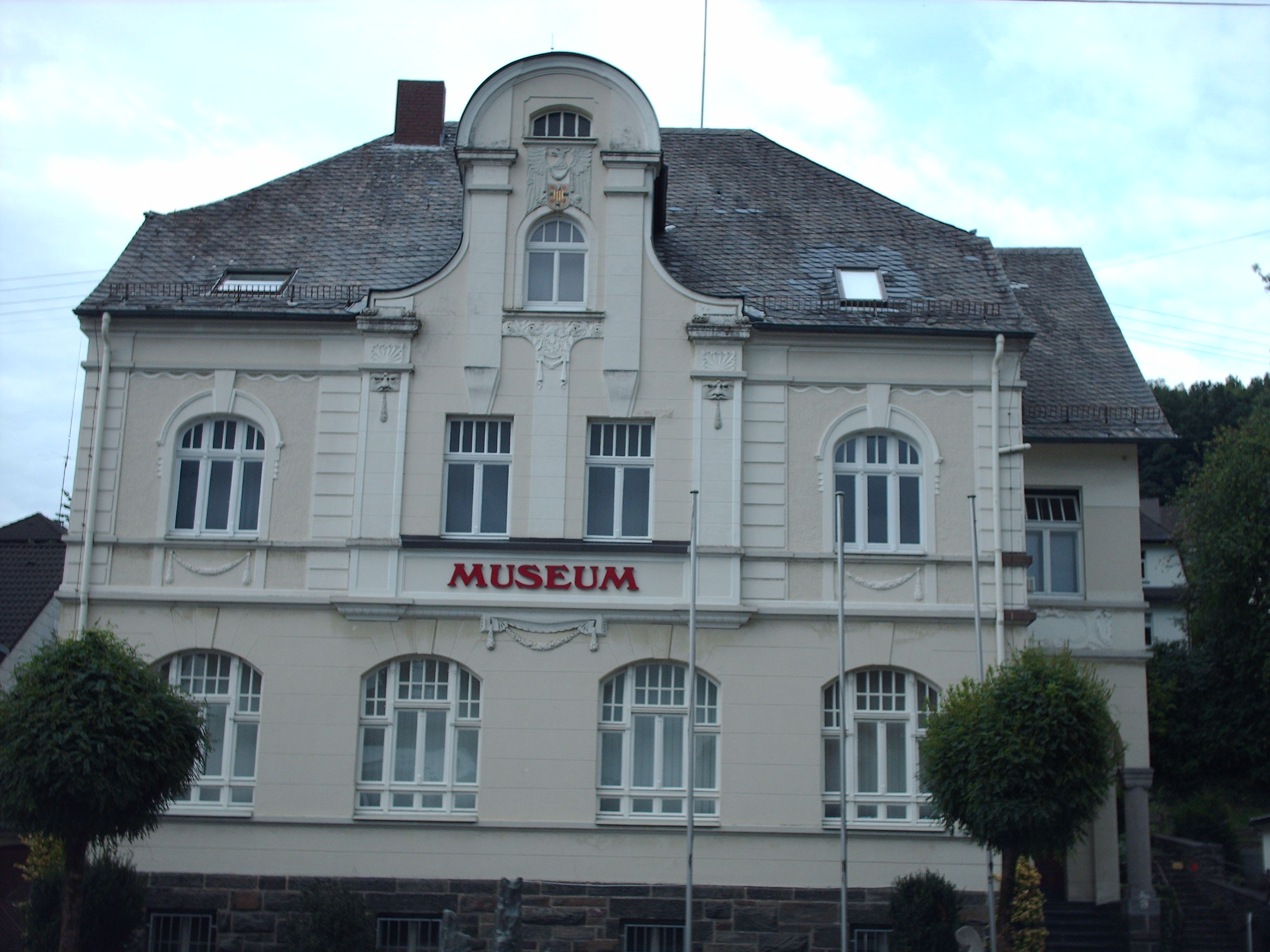
Museum of Lennestadt

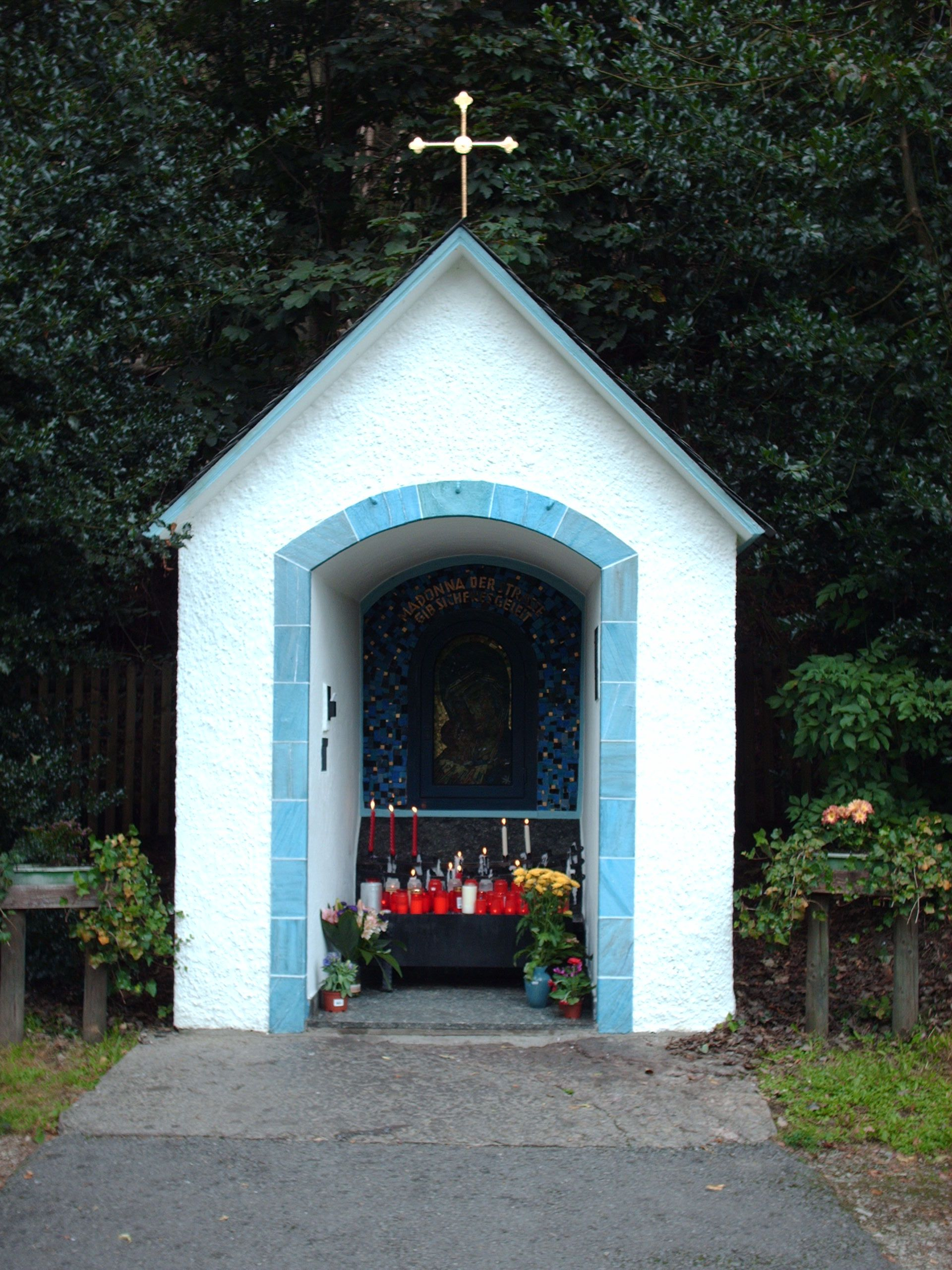
Madonna der Straße

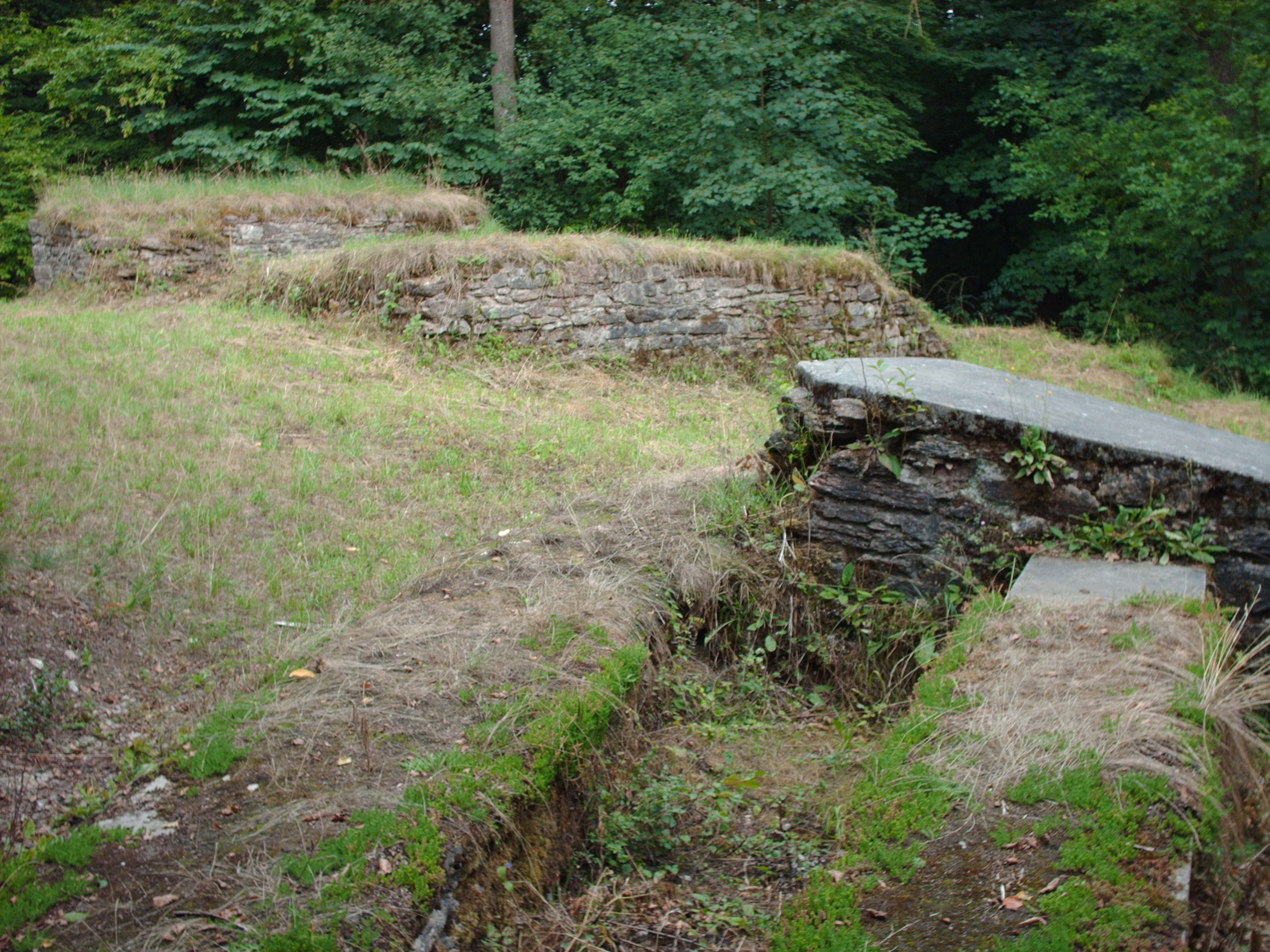
Peperburg castle ruins

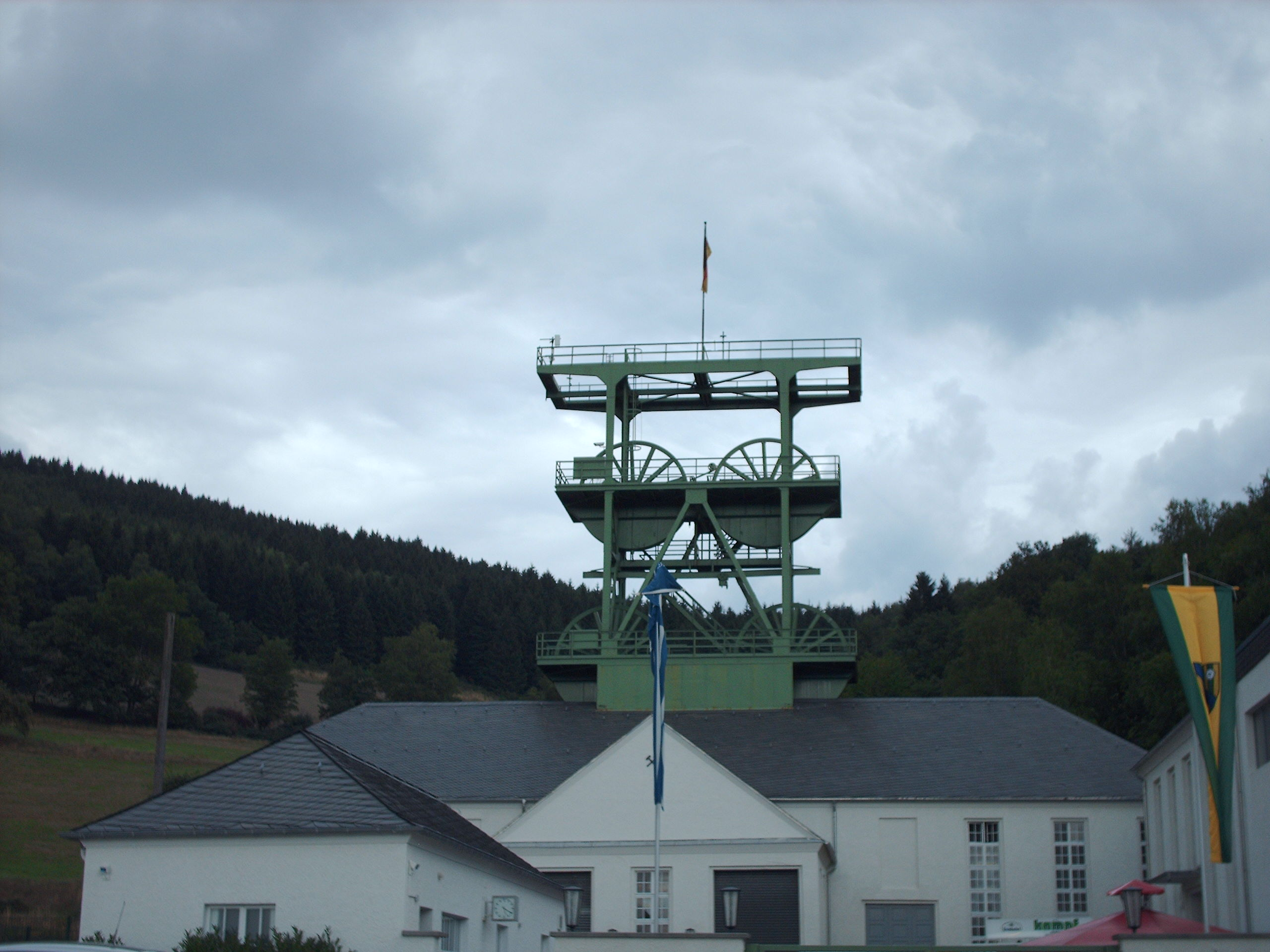
Siciliaschacht mining museum

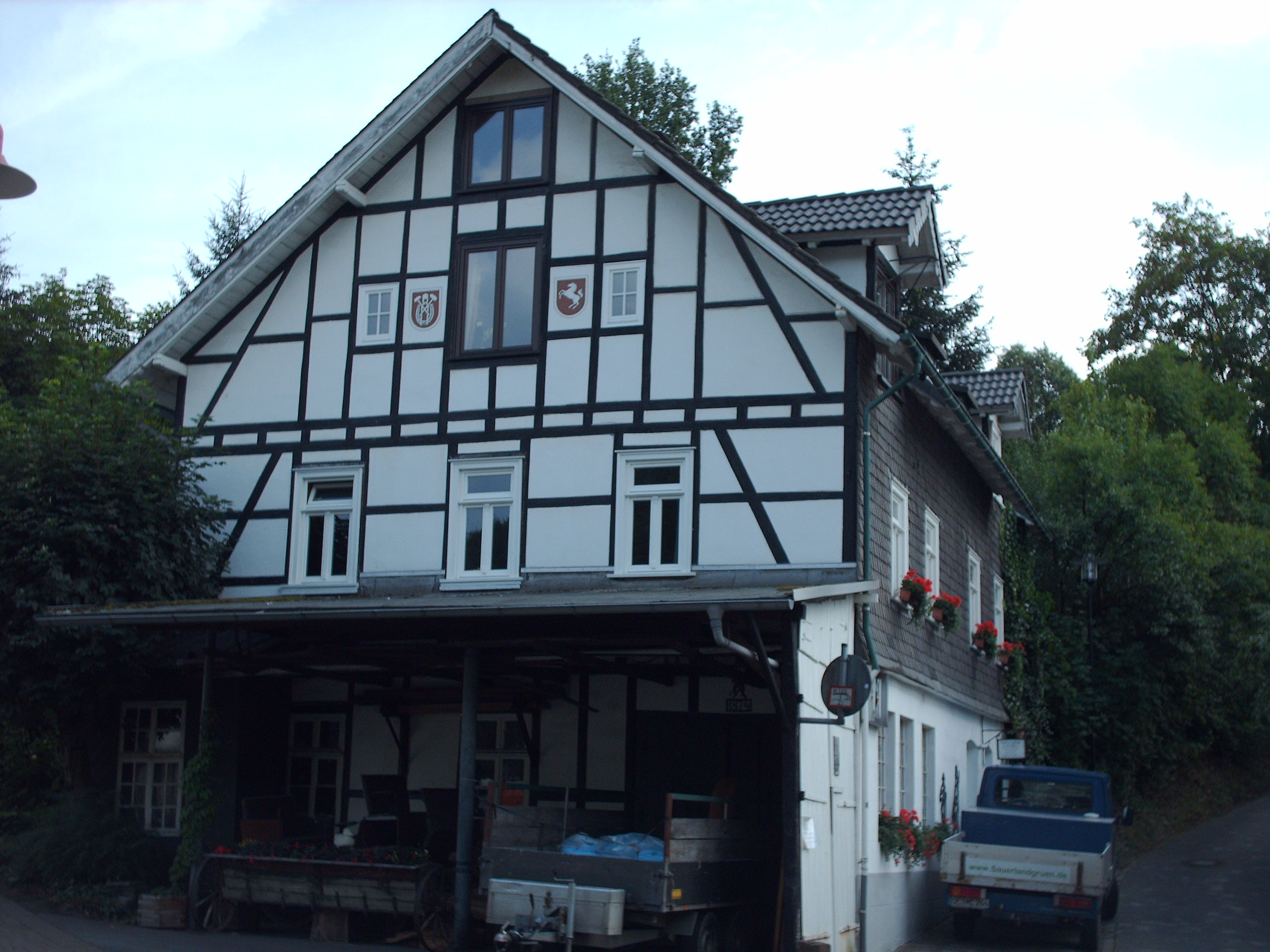
Old smithy in Altenhundem

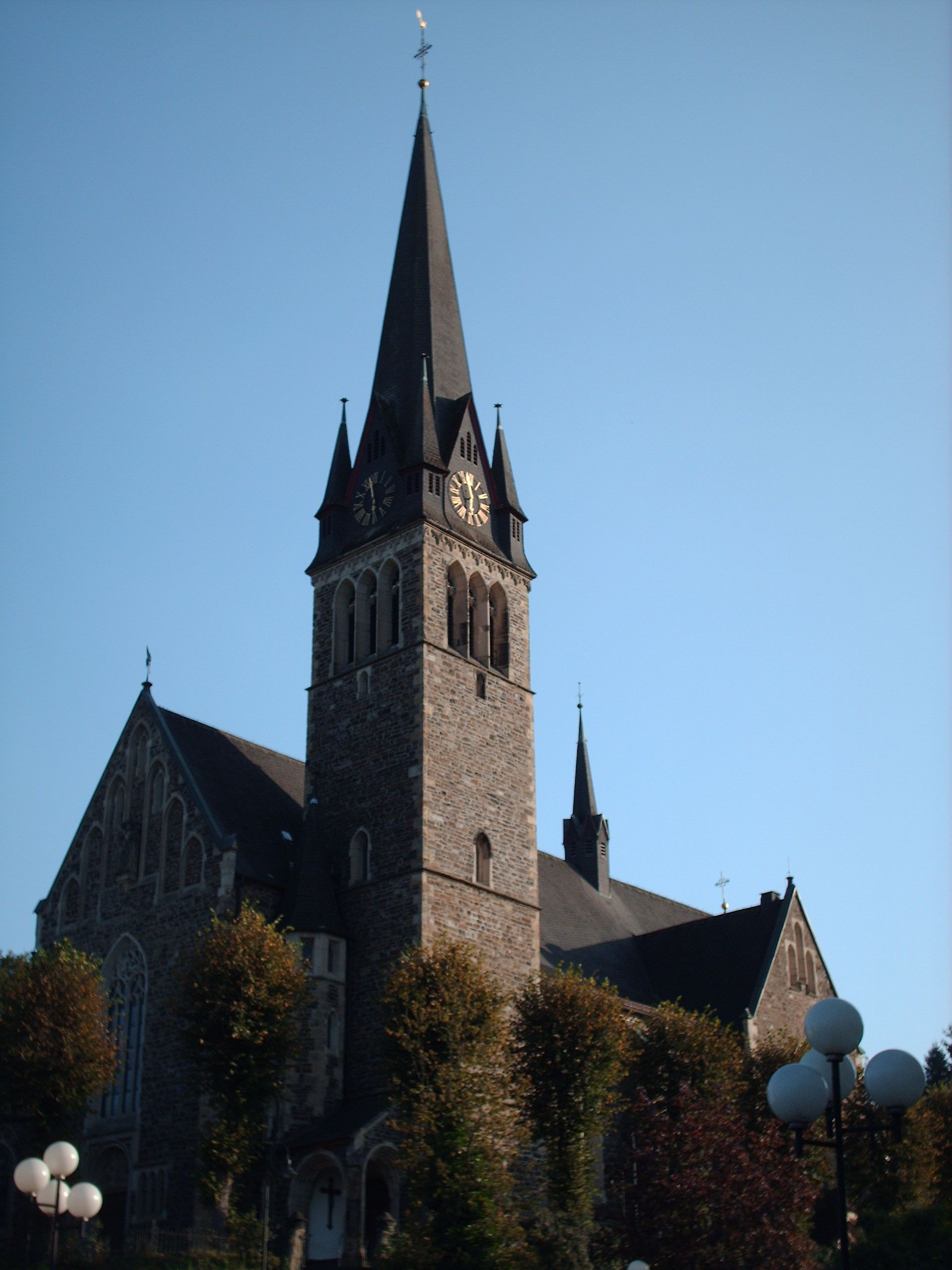
Church of St. Agatha in Altenhundem

=== Parks ===
A spa is to be found in the outlying centre of Saalhausen, which is a recognized Luftkurort (“air spa resort”).

=== Regular events ===
The Elspe Festival in Elspe (Lennestadt), based on the stories by Karl May, attracts about 200,000 spectators every year. The festival area (12 hectares) includes an indoor festival hall, a copy of a Western saloon and some restaurants. Among the town's regular events is the traditional Schützenfest (“fair featuring shooting matches”) that is held in all of the bigger centres each year. Furthermore, every August there is a town festival lasting several days which since 2005 has been held together with the Sauerländer Straßenmusiker-Festival (“Sauerland Street Musicians’ Festival”) in Altenhundem.

== Economy and infrastructure ==
=== Economy ===
Lennestadt is home to a variety of small and middle-sized businesses, mainly in the manufacturing field. Most prevalent are companies in the metal-working, machine building, automotive parts supply, and electrical industry.

=== Public institutions ===
Lennestadt's town hall is located in the central constituent municipality of Altenhundem.

The local court, the Amtsgericht Lennestadt, is located in the outlying centre of Grevenbrück.

=== Transport ===
==== Local public transport ====
With its Altenhundem, Grevenbrück (Westf.) and Lennestadt-Meggen stations, Lennestadt lies on the Ruhr-Sieg line from Hagen to Siegen.

Furthermore, buslines of the Verkehrsbetriebe Westfalen-Süd (VWS, “Westphalia-South Transport Services”) and Busverkehr Ruhr-Sieg (BRS, “Ruhr-Sieg Bus Transport”) run to Kirchhundem, Olpe, Hilchenbach, Finnentrop, Schmallenberg, Meschede and Attendorn.

Lennestadt is located in the area of the fare association Westfalen-Tarif.

===== Historical =====
Until 1944 there was another railway connection to Erndtebrück by the Altenhundem–Birkelbach railway line, whose bridges, however, were blown up by retreating units of the German army in the Second World War. Parts of the tunnels are still preserved.

The line to Wenholthausen was still run until the mid-1960s. At this time, Altenhundem was said to be a railway village.

==== Private transport ====
The Federal Highways (Bundesstraßen) B 55 and B 517 run through the town.

==== Cycle transport ====
Lennestadt is connected to the North Rhine-Westphalia Cycle Transport Network (Radverkehrsnetz NRW) and furthermore lies on the Lenneroute running from the Lenne's source on the Kahler Asten down to its mouth at the Hohensyburg (castle).

=== Media ===
The Westfalenpost and the Westfälische Rundschau each have a local edition in Lennestadt and appear as daily newspapers. As well, the advertising sheets Sauerlandkurier and Sauerländer Wochenanzeiger come out on Wednesdays and Sundays.

Lennestadt belongs to the Westdeutscher Rundfunk Siegen studio area. News from the South Sauerland is broadcast on WDR 2 and in local broadcasts on WDR Fernsehen.

=== Education ===
Lennestadt is home to many elementary schools, one special school whose emphasis is on learning, Hauptschulen, Realschulen and two Gymnasien. Both the Gymnasium der Stadt Lennestadt as well as the Gymnasium Maria Königin are located in Altenhundem. Moreover, there is a folk high school and a professional college. Lennestadt furthermore lies in the feeder area of the University of Siegen.

== Notable people ==
- Karl Joseph Schulte (1871–1941), Archbishop and Cardinal
- Adolf Hennecke (1905–1975), activist in East Germany
- Irmgart Wessel-Zumloh (1907–1980), painter and graphic artist

=== Honorary citizens ===
- Paul Tigges, writer
