= Holthausen (Schmallenberg) =

- Stadtteil of Schmallenberg
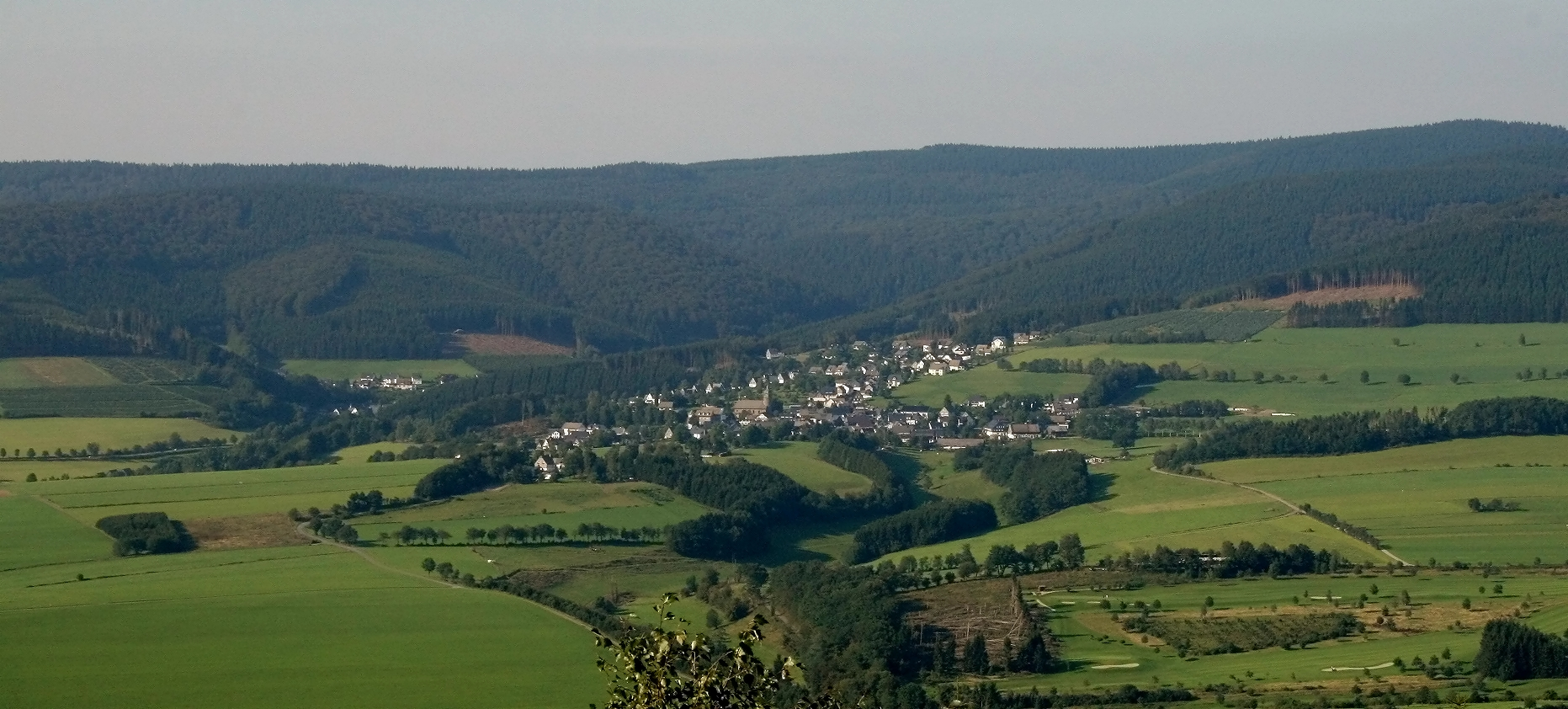
- Interactive map of Holthausen
- Location within Germany Location within North Rhine-Westphalia
- Coordinates: 51°10′57″N 8°20′27″E
- Country: Germany
- State: North Rhine-Westphalia
- Admin. region: Arnsberg
- District: Hochsauerlandkreis
- Town: Schmallenberg

Population (2021-12-31)
  - Total: 555
- Time zone: UTC+01:00 (CET)
  - Summer (DST): UTC+02:00 (CEST)

Holthausen is a locality in the municipality Schmallenberg in the High Sauerland District in North Rhine-Westphalia, Germany.

The village has 555 inhabitants and lies in the east of the municipality of Schmallenberg at a height of around 492 m. Holthausen borders on the villages of Bad Fredeburg, Gleidorf, Huxel, Rellmecke, Niedersorpe and Winkhausen.

The village used to belong to the municipality of Oberkirchen in Amt Schmallenberg until the end of 1974.

== Gallery ==
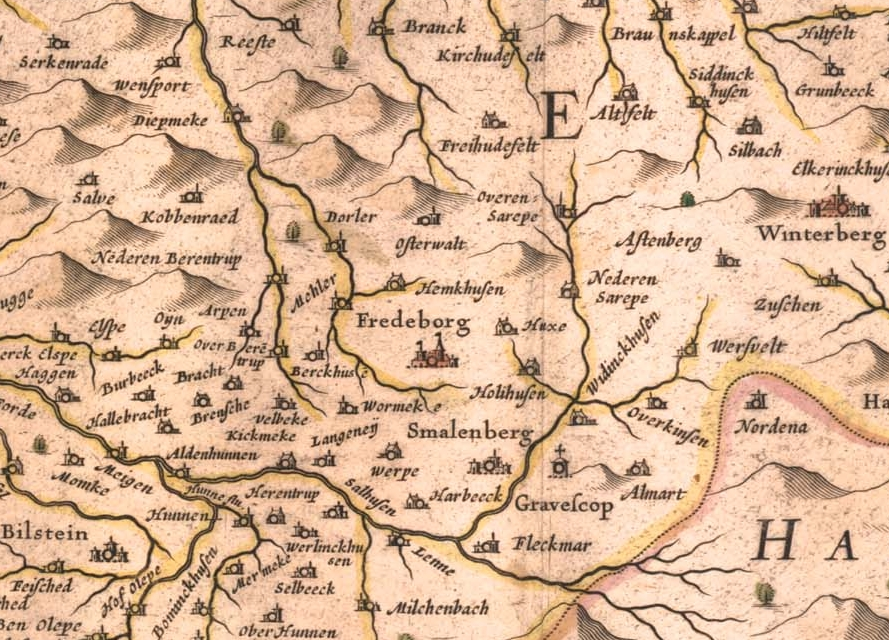
„Holihusen“ 1645 - Westphalia Ducatus (Duchy of Westphalia)

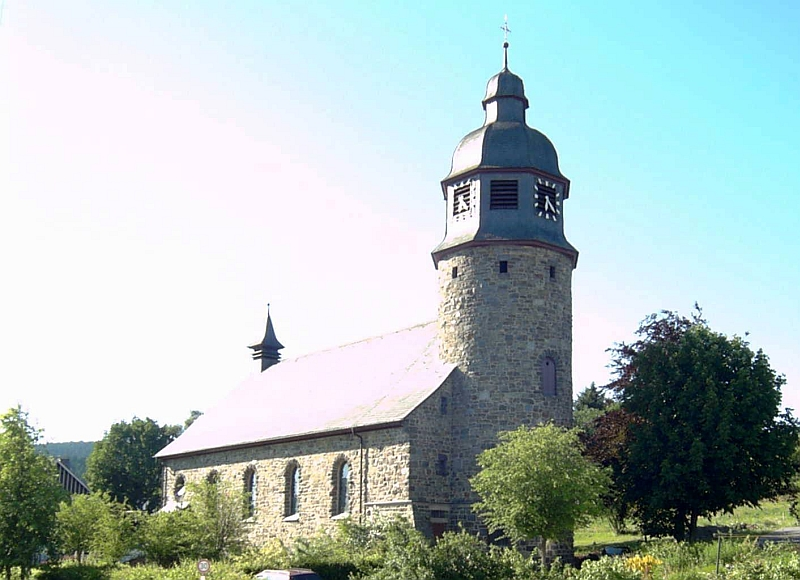
St. Michael Church, Holthausen
