= Niedersorpe =

- Stadtteil of Schmallenberg
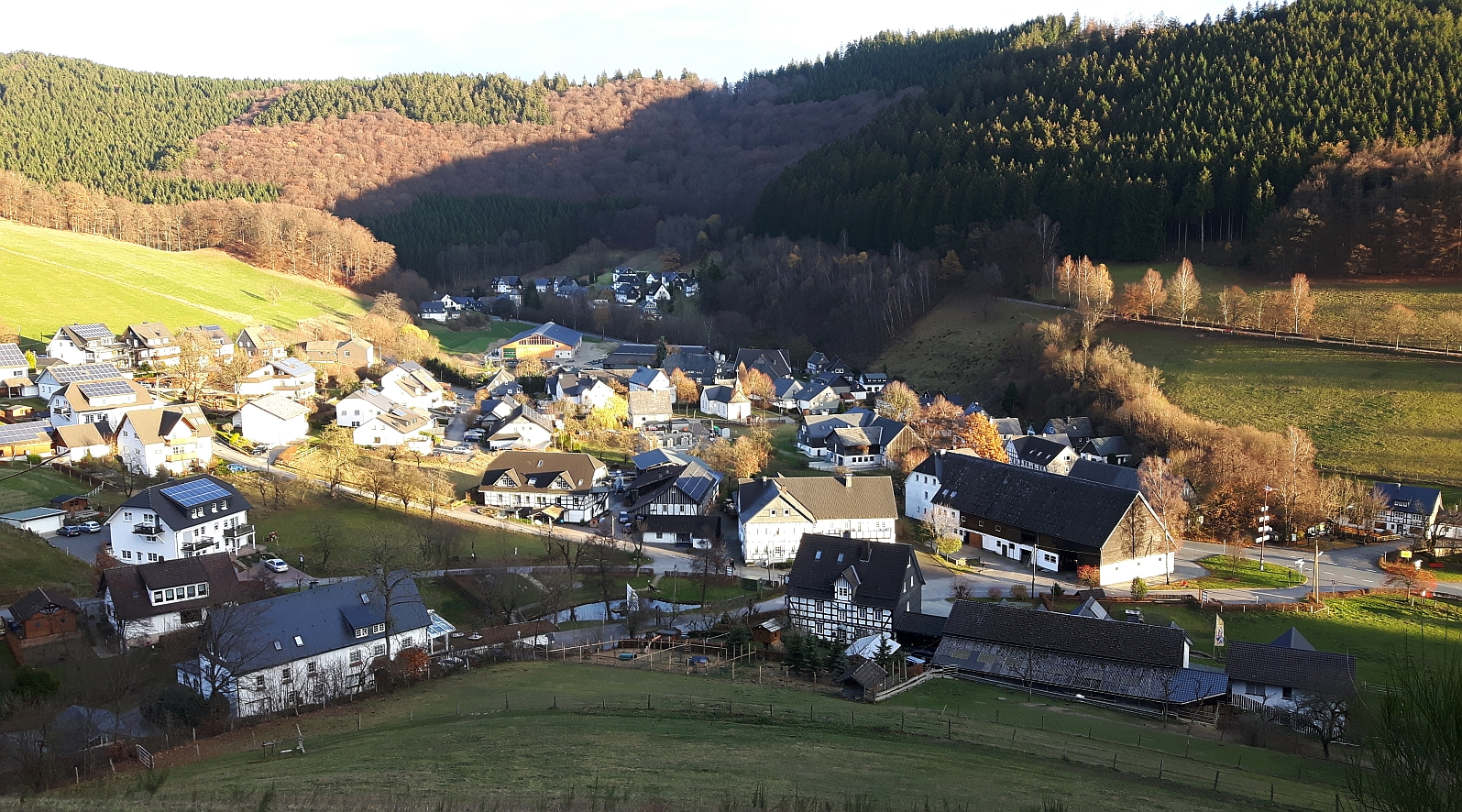
- Interactive map of Niedersorpe
- Location within Germany Location within North Rhine-Westphalia
- Coordinates: 51°10′8″N 8°21′34″E
- Country: Germany
- State: North Rhine-Westphalia
- Admin. region: Arnsberg
- District: Hochsauerlandkreis
- Town: Schmallenberg

Population (2021-12-31)
  - Total: 229
- Time zone: UTC+01:00 (CET)
  - Summer (DST): UTC+02:00 (CEST)

Niedersorpe is a locality in the municipality Schmallenberg in the High Sauerland District in North Rhine-Westphalia, Germany.

The village has 229 inhabitants and lies in the east of the municipality of Schmallenberg at a height of around 432 m. The river Sorpe flows through the village. Niedersorpe borders on the villages of Holthausen, Rellmecke, Oberkirchen, Winkhausen and Gleidorf.

The first written document mentioning Suropo dates from 1072 in a charter from Grafschaft Abbey of bishop Anno of Cologne. The village used to belong to the municipality of Oberkirchen in Amt Schmallenberg until the end of 1974.

== Gallery ==
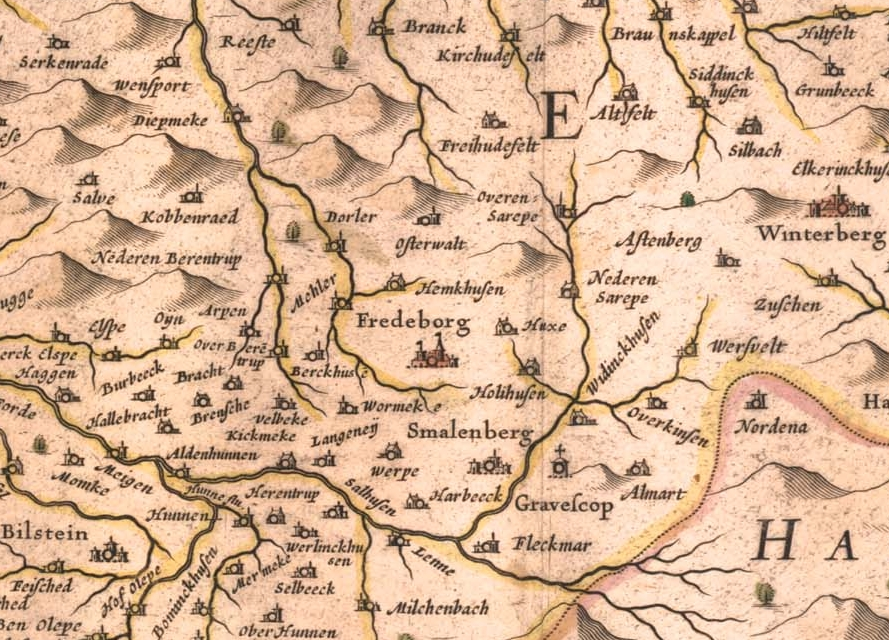
„Nederen Sarepe“ 1645 - Westphalia Ducatus (Duchy of Westphalia)

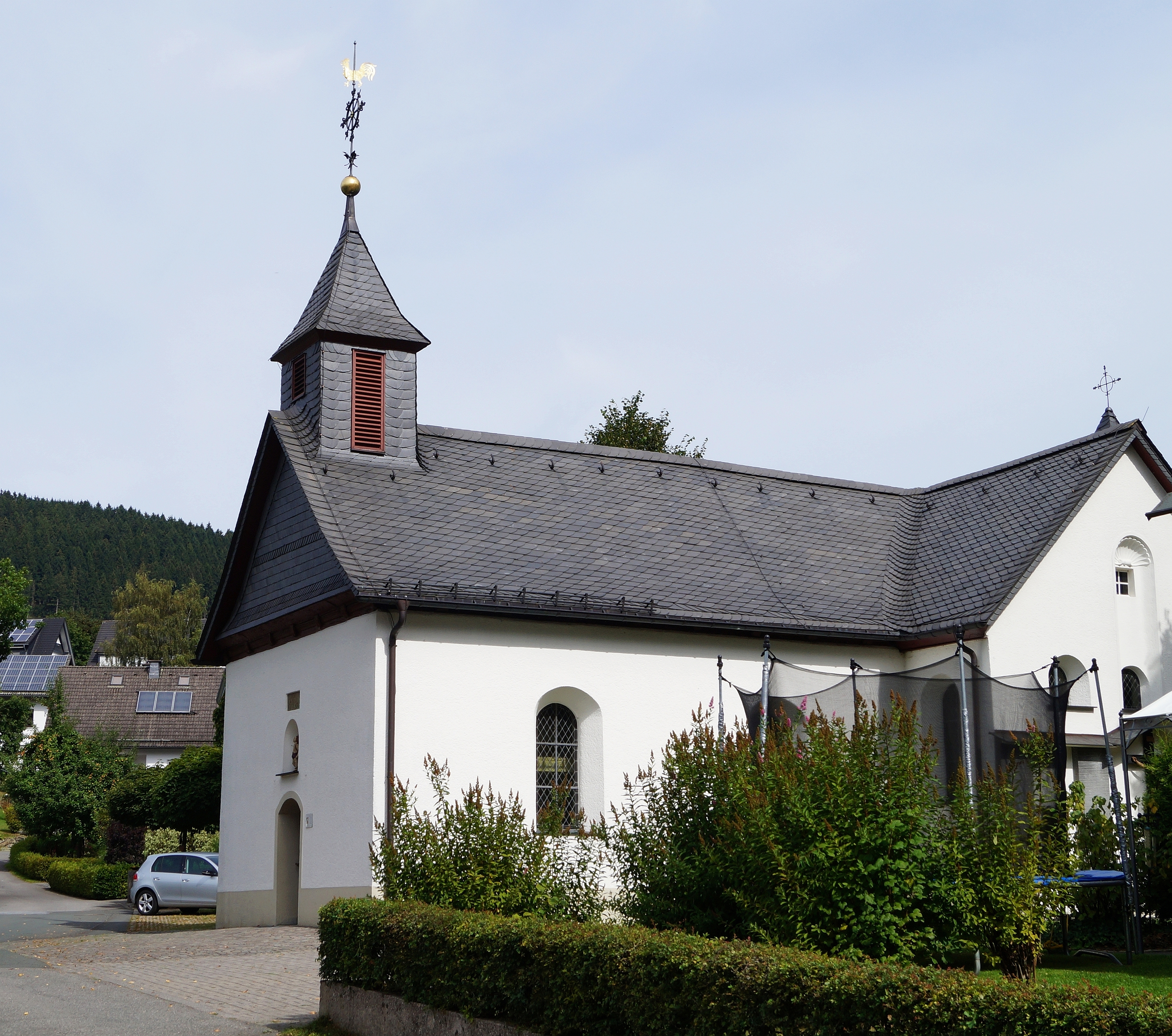
St. Sebastian Chapel

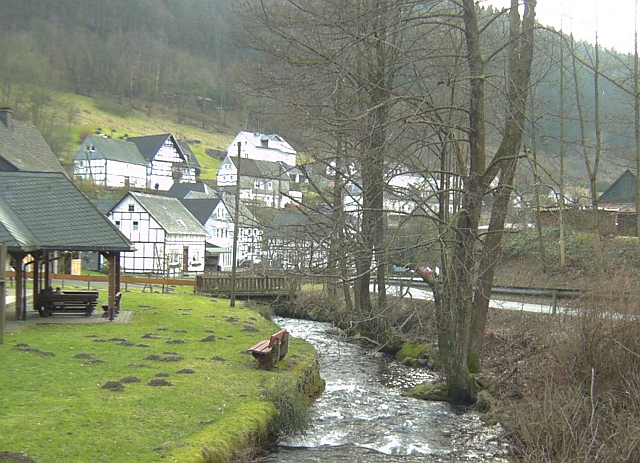
River Sorpe
