= Rellmecke =

- Stadtteil of Schmallenberg
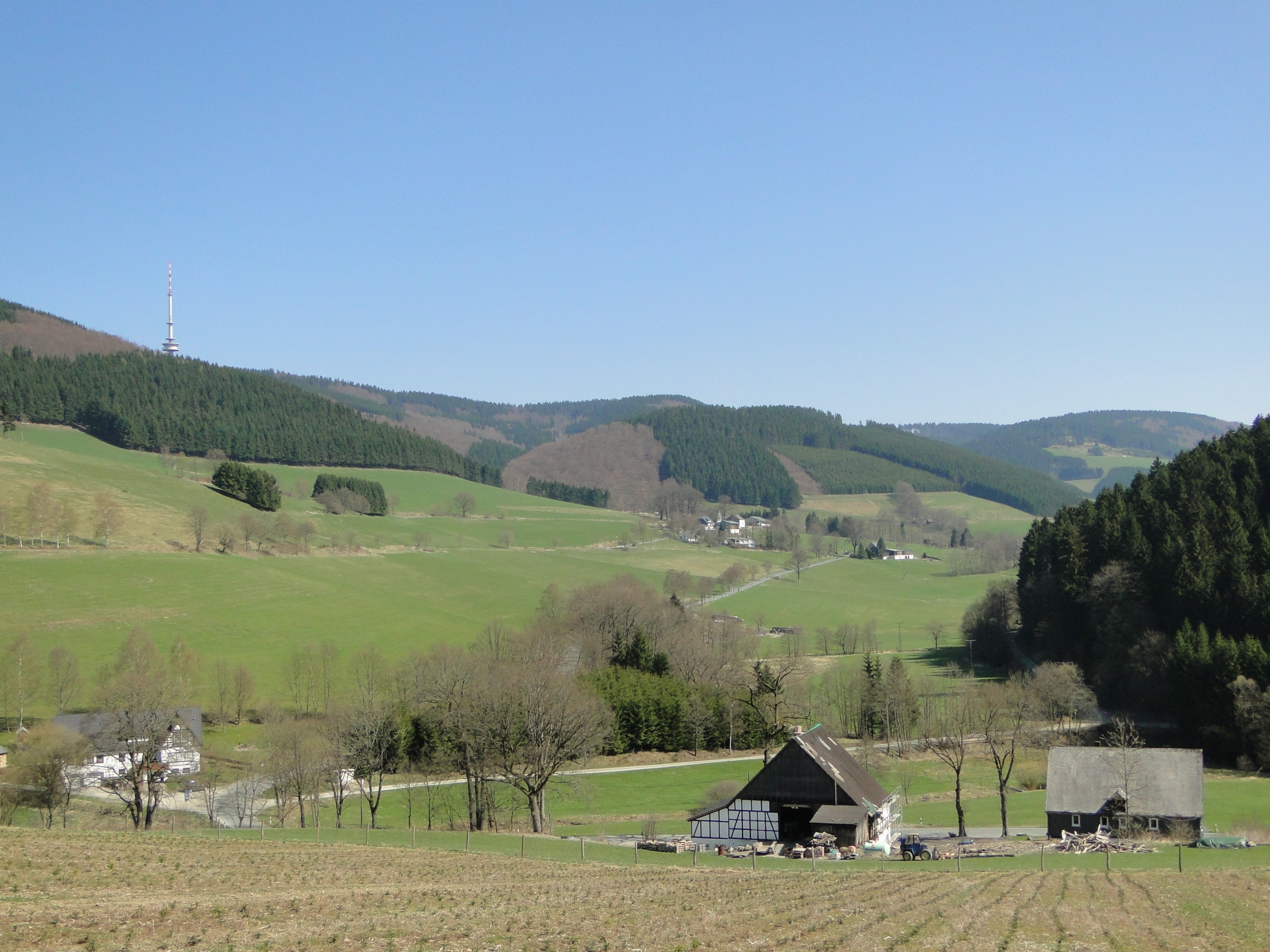
- Interactive map of Rellmecke
- Location within Germany Location within North Rhine-Westphalia
- Coordinates: 51°11′15″N 8°22′11″E
- Country: Germany
- State: North Rhine-Westphalia
- Admin. region: Arnsberg
- District: Hochsauerlandkreis
- Town: Schmallenberg

Population (2021-12-31)
  - Total: 9
- Time zone: UTC+01:00 (CET)
  - Summer (DST): UTC+02:00 (CEST)

Rellmecke is a locality in the municipality Schmallenberg in the district Hochsauerlandkreis in North Rhine-Westphalia, Germany.

The hamlet has 9 inhabitants and lies in the east of the municipality of Schmallenberg at a height of around 490 m. Rellmecke borders on the villages of Niedersorpe and Mittelsorpe. The river Sorpe flows through the hamlet.

Rellmecke used to belong to the municipality of Oberkirchen in Amt Schmallenberg until the end of 1974.
