= Gleierbach =

River in Germany

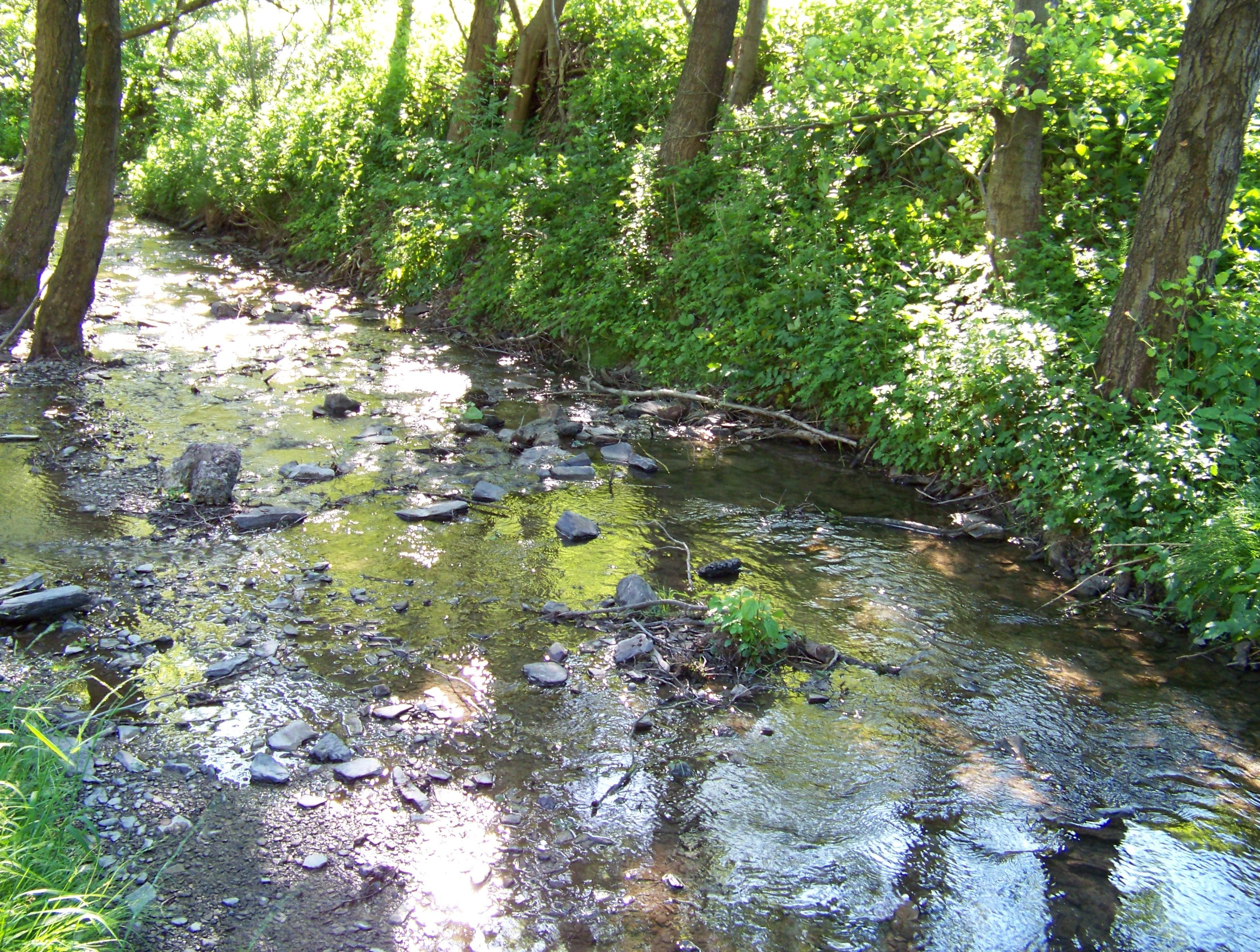

Location
- Country: Germany
- State: North Rhine-Westphalia

Physical characteristics
- Mouth
  - location: Lenne
  - coordinates: 51.1641°N 8.3123°E
- Length: 7.1 km (4.4 mi)

Basin features
- Progression: Lenne→ Ruhr→ Rhine→ North Sea

Gleierbach (also: Gleiderbach, in its upper and middle course also Westernah or Westernahbach) is a river of North Rhine-Westphalia, Germany. It flows through the municipality Schmallenberg. It is a right tributary of the Lenne, which it joins in Gleidorf, east of Schmallenberg.

== See also ==
- List of rivers of North Rhine-Westphalia
