= Huxel =

- Stadtteil of Schmallenberg
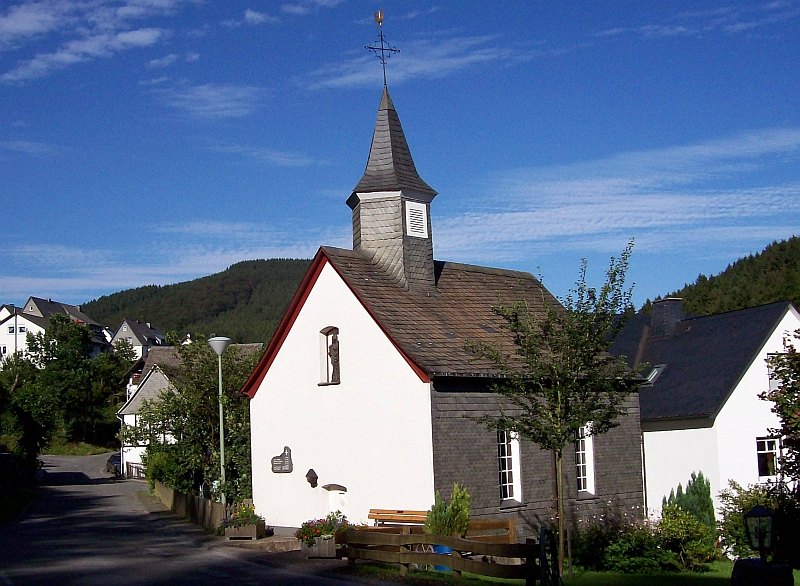
- Interactive map of Huxel
- Location within Germany Location within North Rhine-Westphalia
- Coordinates: 51°11′21″N 8°20′6″E
- Country: Germany
- State: North Rhine-Westphalia
- Admin. region: Arnsberg
- District: Hochsauerlandkreis
- Town: Schmallenberg

Population (2019-12-31)
  - Total: 147
- Time zone: UTC+01:00 (CET)
  - Summer (DST): UTC+02:00 (CEST)

Huxel is a locality in the municipality Schmallenberg in the High Sauerland District in North Rhine-Westphalia, Germany.

The village has 147 inhabitants and lies in the east of the municipality of Schmallenberg at a height of around 470 m. The river Westernah flows through the village. Huxel borders on the villages of Bad Fredeburg and Holthausen.

The place was mentioned in the 14th century in the records of the Grafschaft Abbey. The village used to belong to the municipality of Oberkirchen in Amt Schmallenberg until the end of 1974.

== Gallery ==
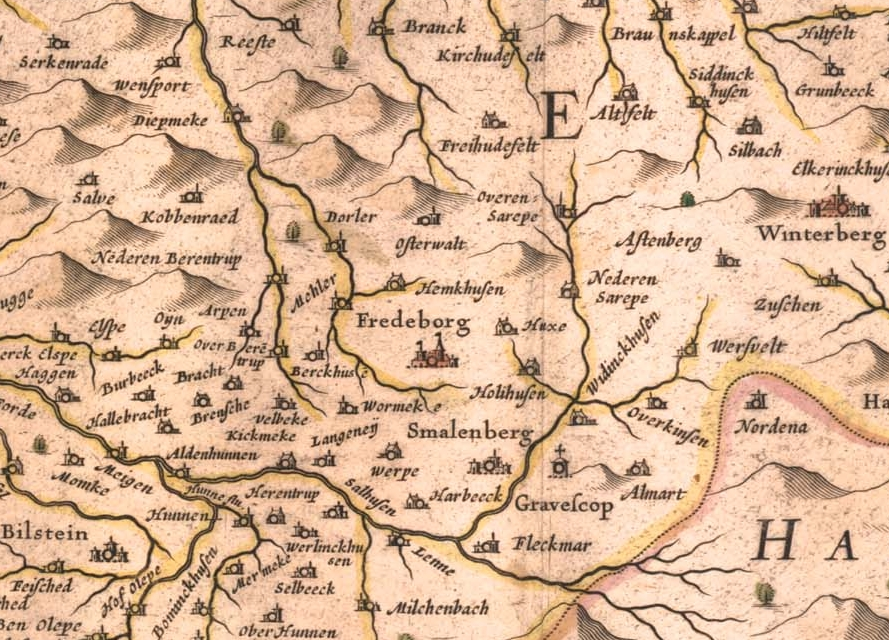
„Huxe“ 1645 - Westphalia Ducatus (Duchy of Westphalia)

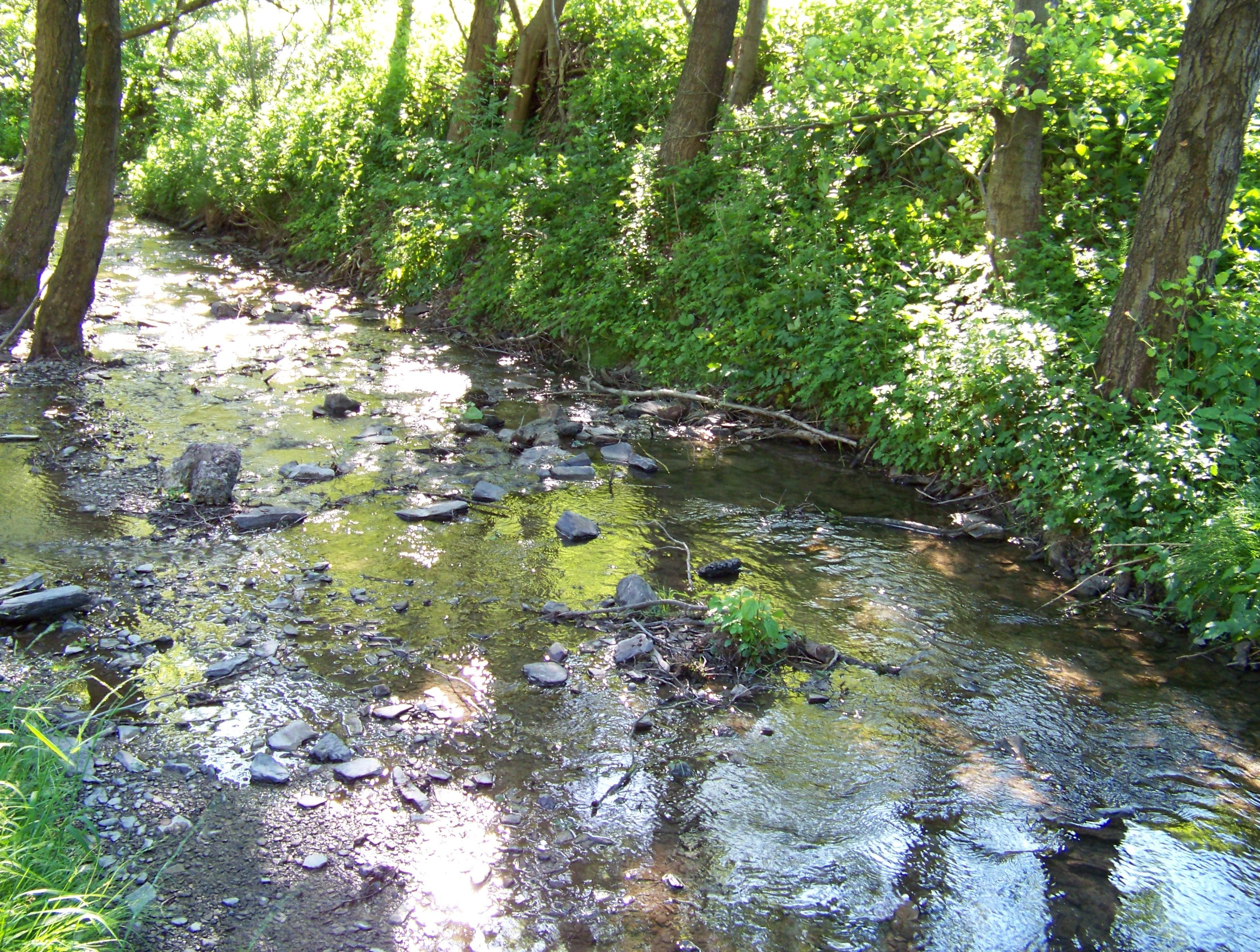
Westernah near Huxel
