= Grafschaft (Schmallenberg) =

- Stadtteil of Schmallenberg
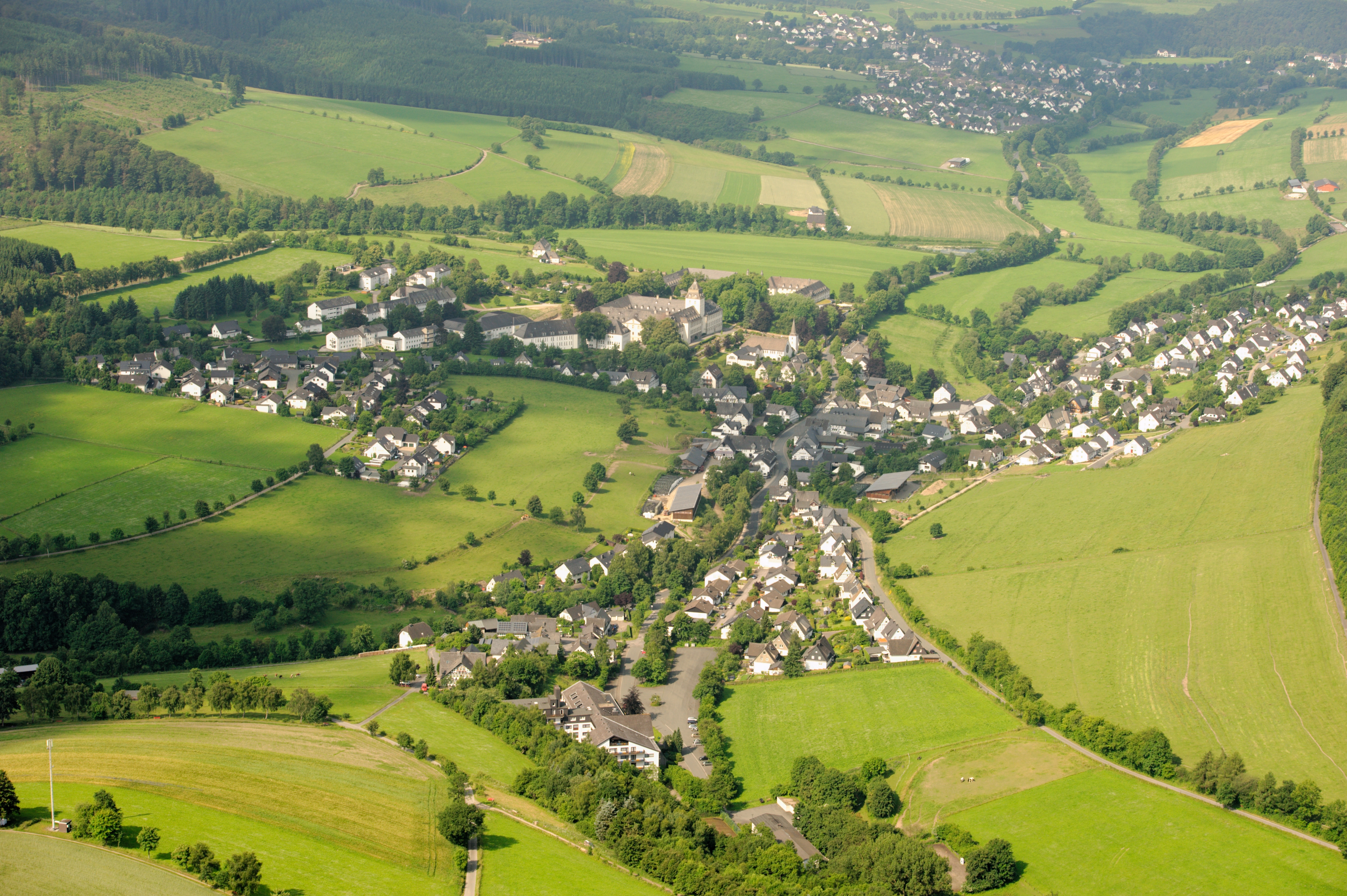

- Coat of arms
- Interactive map of Grafschaft
- Location within Germany Location within North Rhine-Westphalia
- Coordinates: 51°8′45″N 8°19′31″E
- Country: Germany
- State: North Rhine-Westphalia
- Admin. region: Arnsberg
- District: Hochsauerlandkreis
- Town: Schmallenberg

Population (2021-12-31)
  - Total: 1,097
- Time zone: UTC+01:00 (CET)
  - Summer (DST): UTC+02:00 (CEST)

Grafschaft is a locality in the municipality Schmallenberg in the High Sauerland District in North Rhine-Westphalia, Germany.

The village has 1097 inhabitants and lies in the east of the municipality of Schmallenberg at a height of around 410 m. The river Grafschaft flows through the village. Grafschaft borders on the villages of Schmallenberg, Gleidorf, Winkhausen, Almert, Störmecke and Latrop.

In 1072 a Benedictine monastery of Grafschaft was founded in Grafschaft on a site at the foot of the Wilzenberg mountain, by St. Anno II, Archbishop of Cologne. The village used to belong to the municipality of Grafschaft in Amt Schmallenberg until the end of 1974.

== Gallery ==
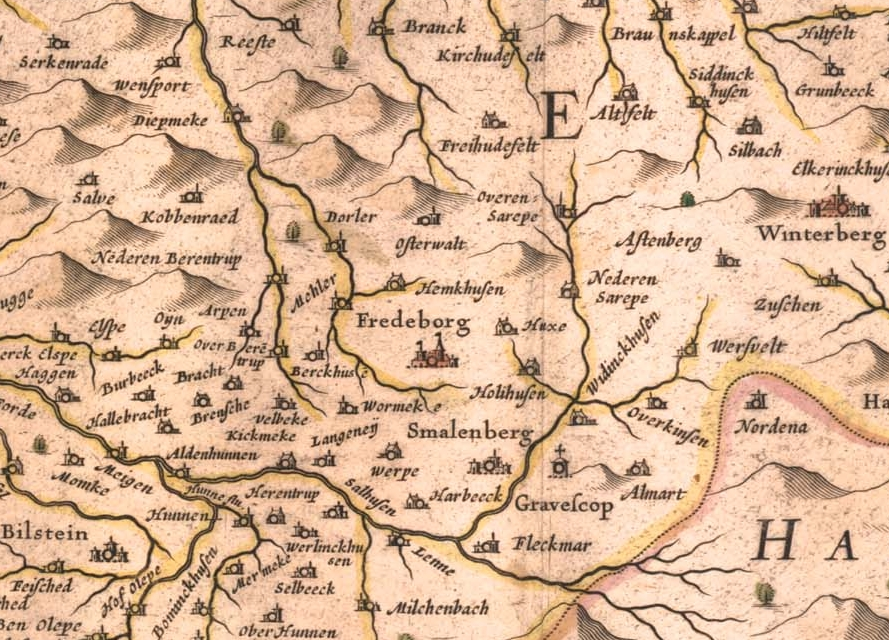
„Gravelcop“ 1645 - Westphalia Ducatus (Duchy of Westphalia)

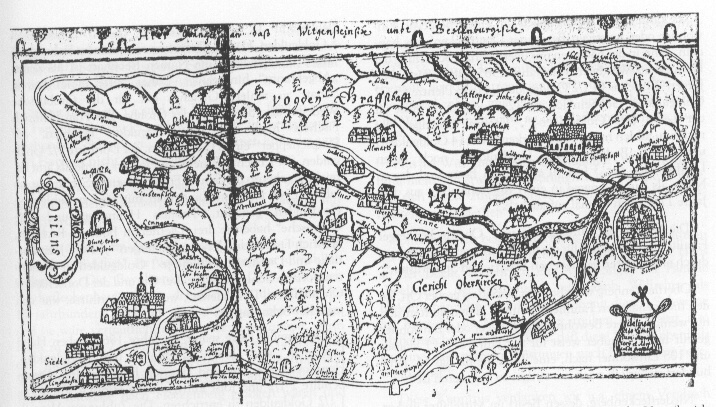
Vogtei Grafschaft, 1697

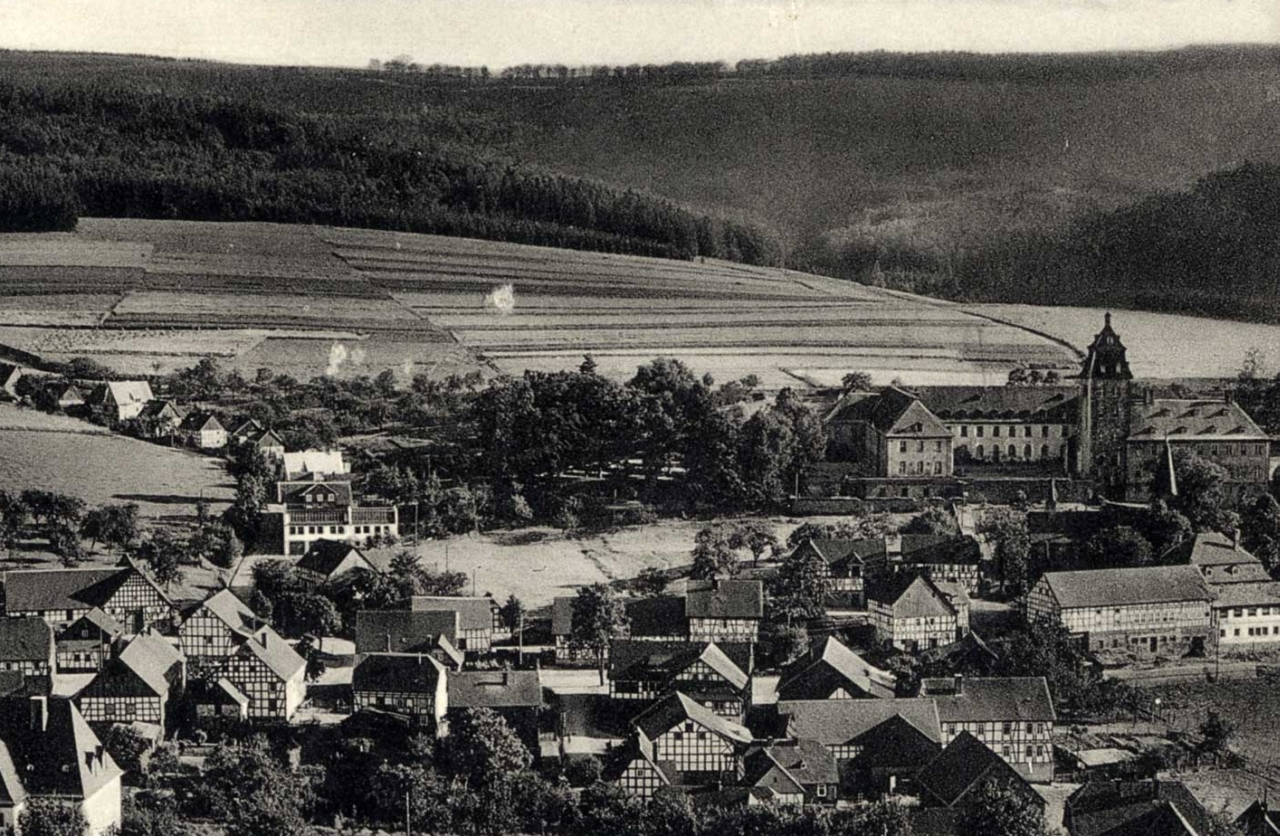
Grafschaft, 1903

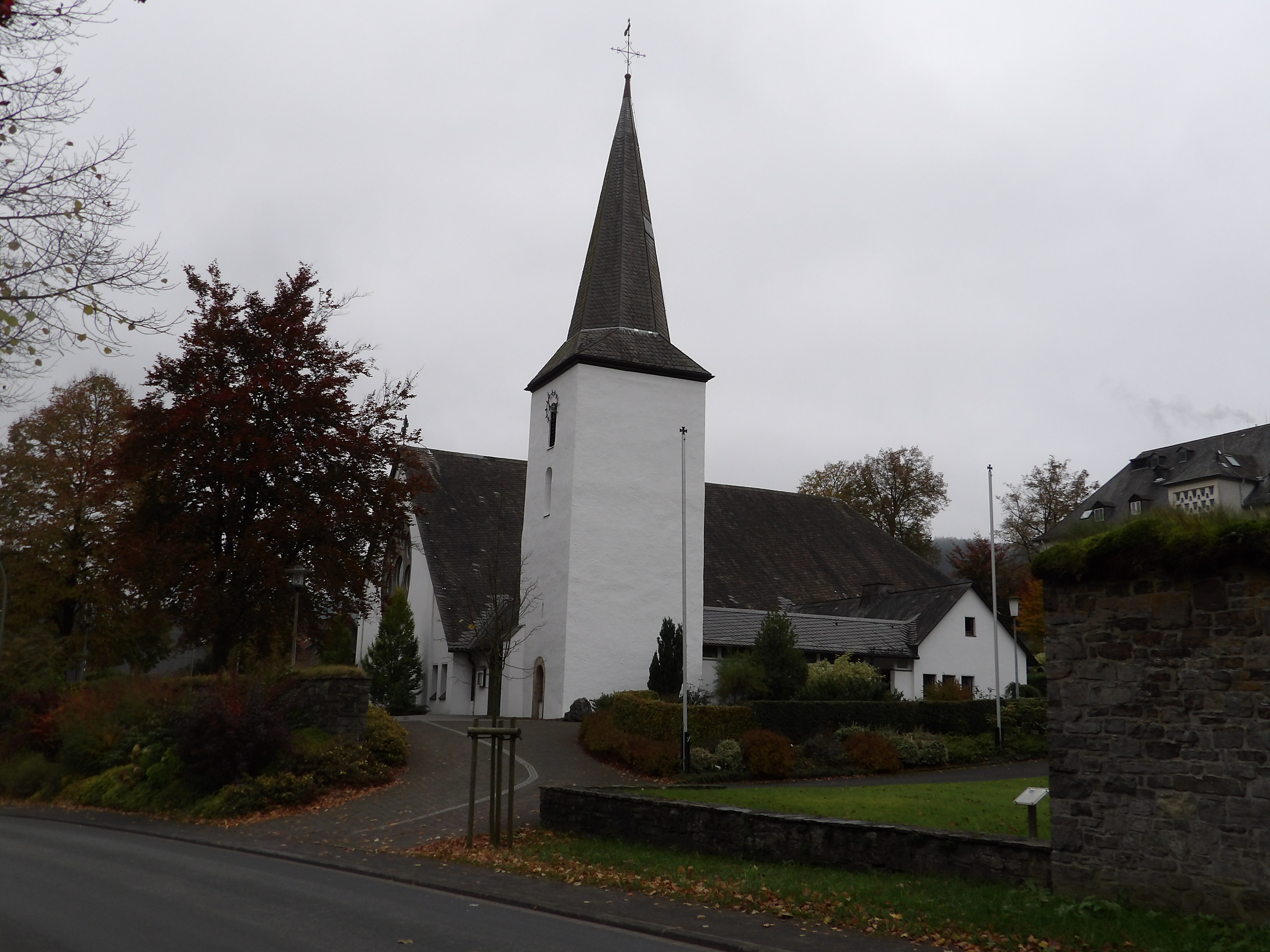
St. Georg Church, 1963
