= Winkhausen (Schmallenberg) =

- Stadtteil of Schmallenberg
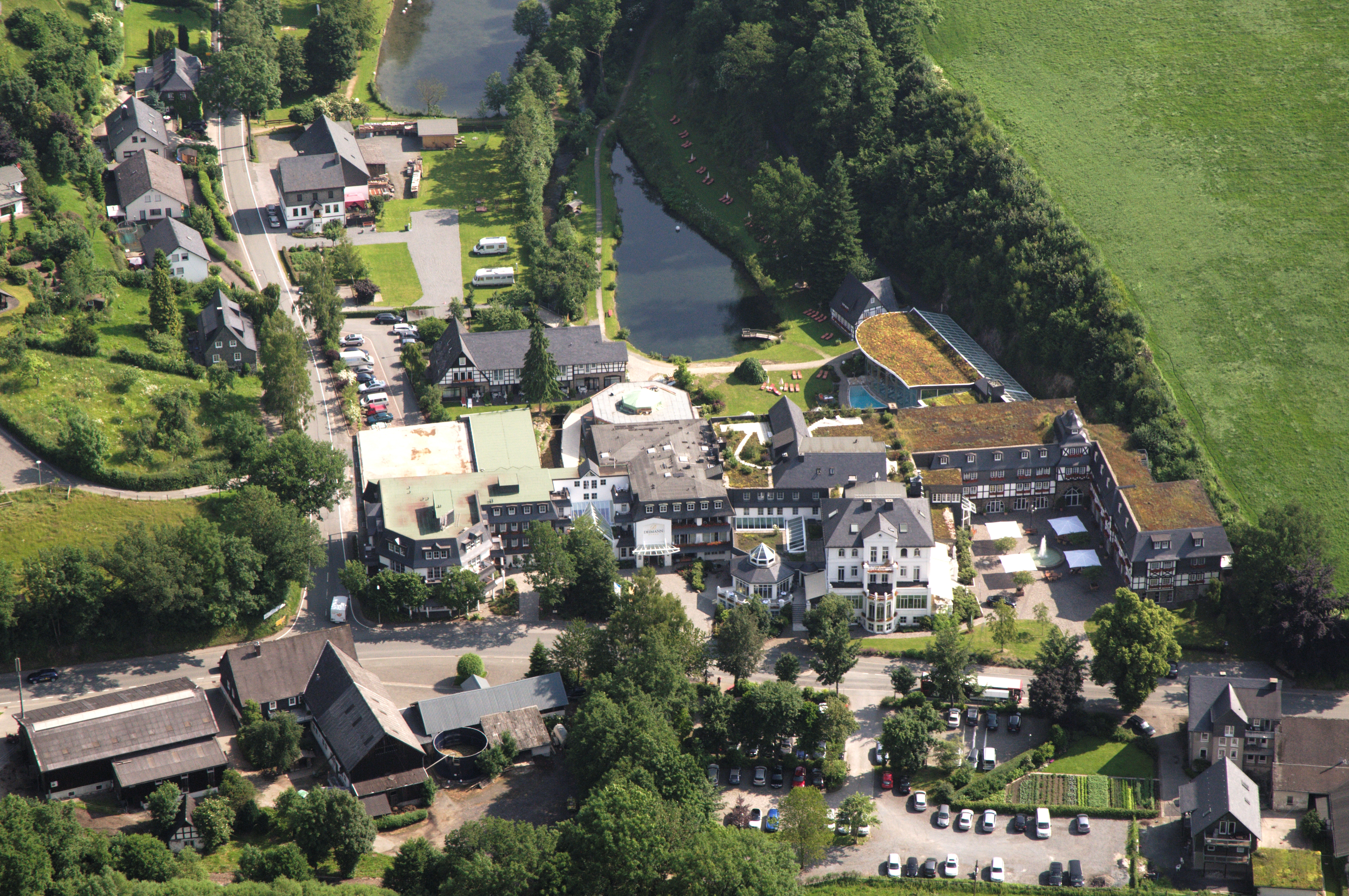
- Interactive map of Winkhausen
- Location within Germany Location within North Rhine-Westphalia
- Coordinates: 51°9′35″N 8°20′22″E
- Country: Germany
- State: North Rhine-Westphalia
- Admin. region: Arnsberg
- District: Hochsauerlandkreis
- Town: Schmallenberg

Population (2021-12-31)
  - Total: 207
- Time zone: UTC+01:00 (CET)
  - Summer (DST): UTC+02:00 (CEST)

Winkhausen is a locality in the municipality Schmallenberg in the High Sauerland District in North Rhine-Westphalia, Germany.

The village has 207 inhabitants and lies in the east of the municipality of Schmallenberg at a height of around 410 m.

In the village centre the Landesstraße 742 meets the Bundesstraße 236 and the river Sorpe flows in the river Lenne. Winkhausen borders on the villages of Almert, Grafschaft, Gleidorf, Niedersorpe and Oberkirchen.

The first written document mentioning Widinchusen dates from 1395. The village used to belong to the municipality of Oberkirchen in Amt Schmallenberg until the end of 1974.

== Gallery ==
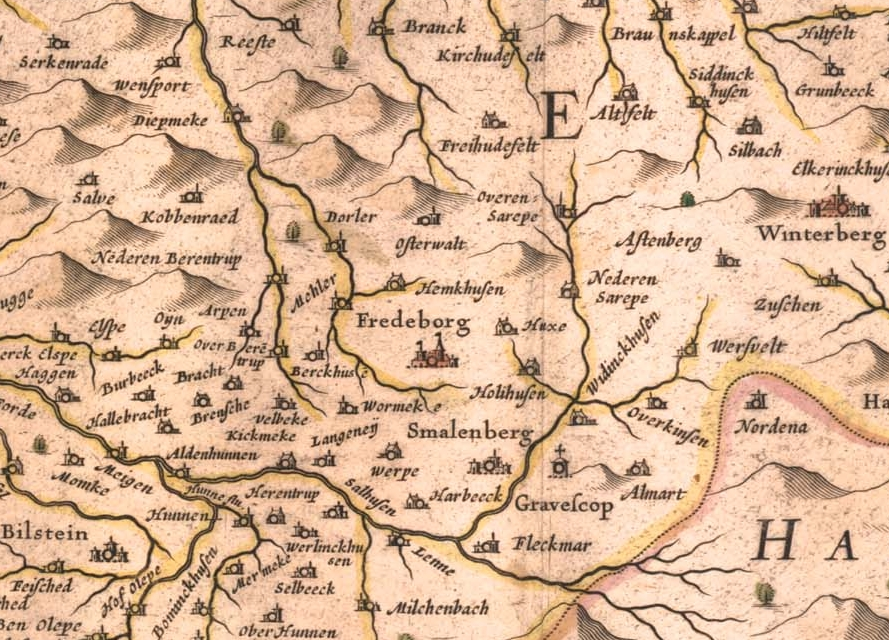
„Widinckhusen“ 1645 - Westphalia Ducatus (Duchy of Westphalia)

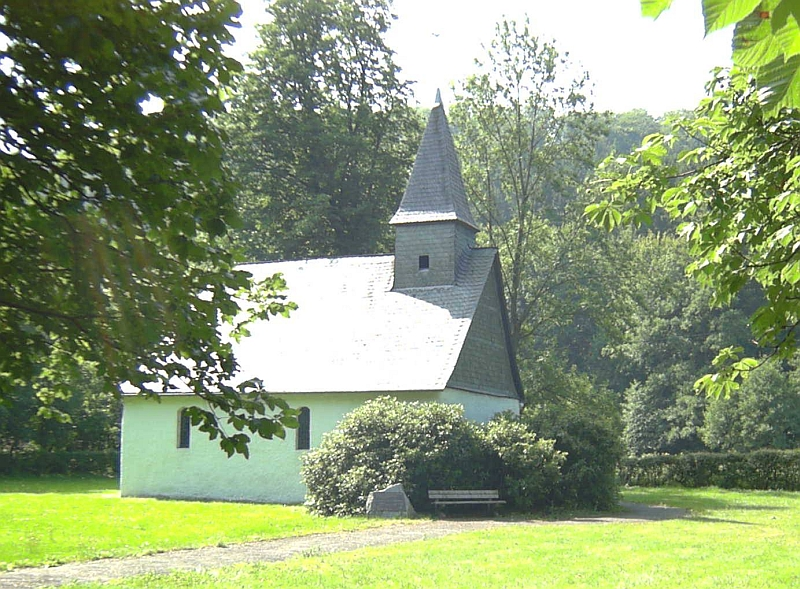
Katharina Chapel
