= Almert =

- Stadtteil of Schmallenberg
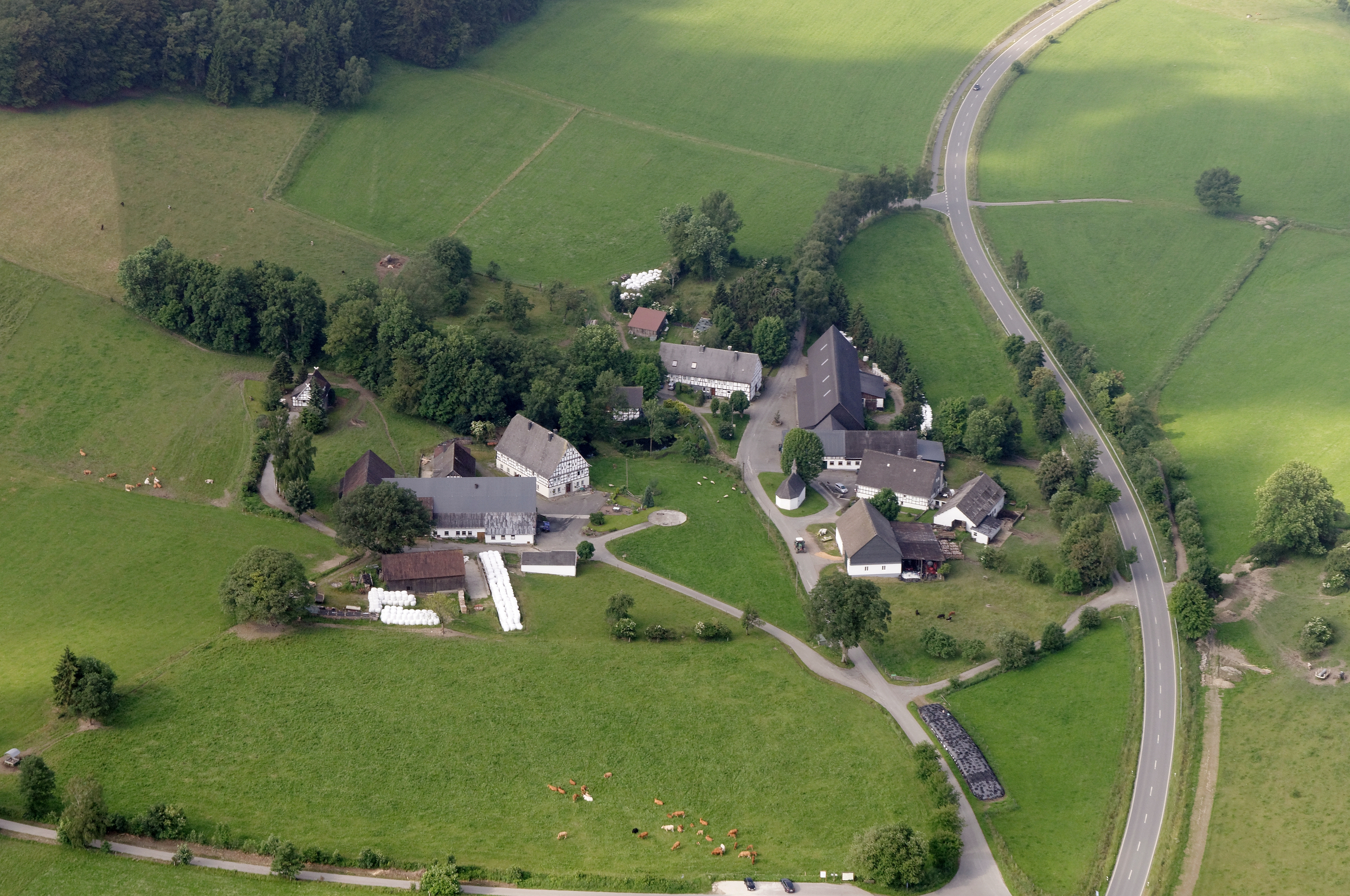
- Interactive map of Almert
- Location within Germany Location within North Rhine-Westphalia
- Coordinates: 51°8′57″N 8°21′29″E
- Country: Germany
- State: North Rhine-Westphalia
- Admin. region: Arnsberg
- District: Hochsauerlandkreis
- Town: Schmallenberg
- Elevation: 520 m (1,710 ft)

Population (2021-12-31)
  - Total: 15
- Time zone: UTC+01:00 (CET)
  - Summer (DST): UTC+02:00 (CEST)

Almert is a locality in the municipality Schmallenberg in the High Sauerland District in North Rhine-Westphalia, Germany.

The village has 15 inhabitants and lies in the east of the municipality of Schmallenberg at a height of around 520 m. The brook Unterste Wiesen rises by Almert. Almert borders on the villages of Grafschaft, Winkhausen, Oberkirchen and Schanze. The village used to belong to the municipality of Oberkirchen in Amt Schmallenberg until the end of 1974.

== Gallery ==
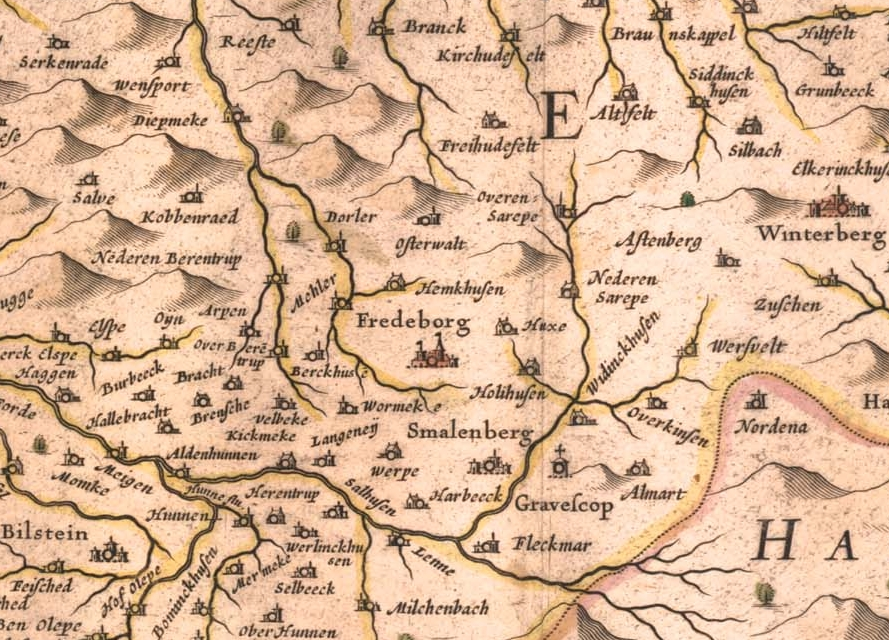
„Almart“ 1645 - Westphalia Ducatus (Duchy of Westphalia)

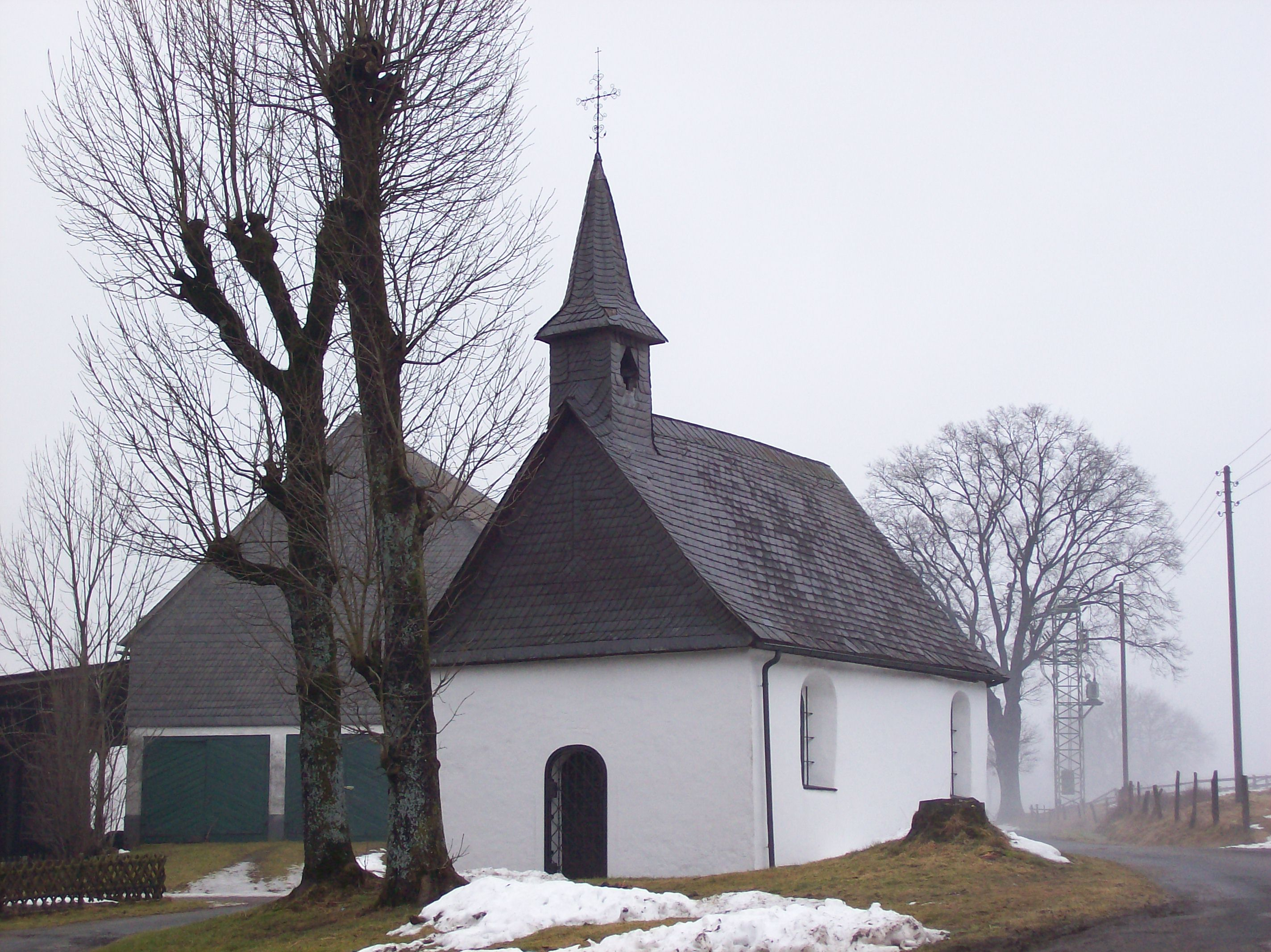
Almert, Chapel St. Maria Magdalena

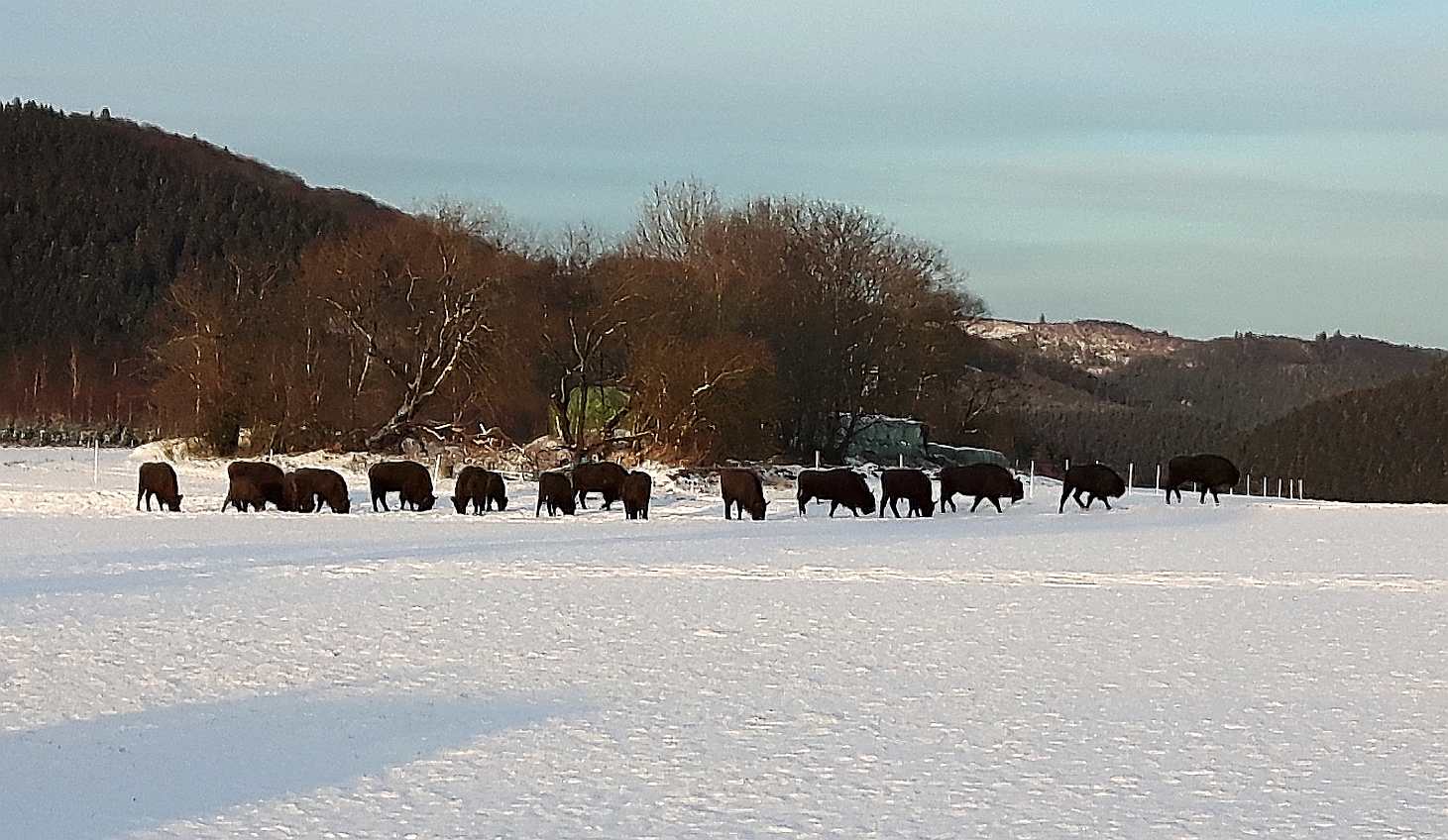
Free-living European bison near Schmallenberg-Almert
