= Bad Fredeburg =

- Stadtteil of Schmallenberg
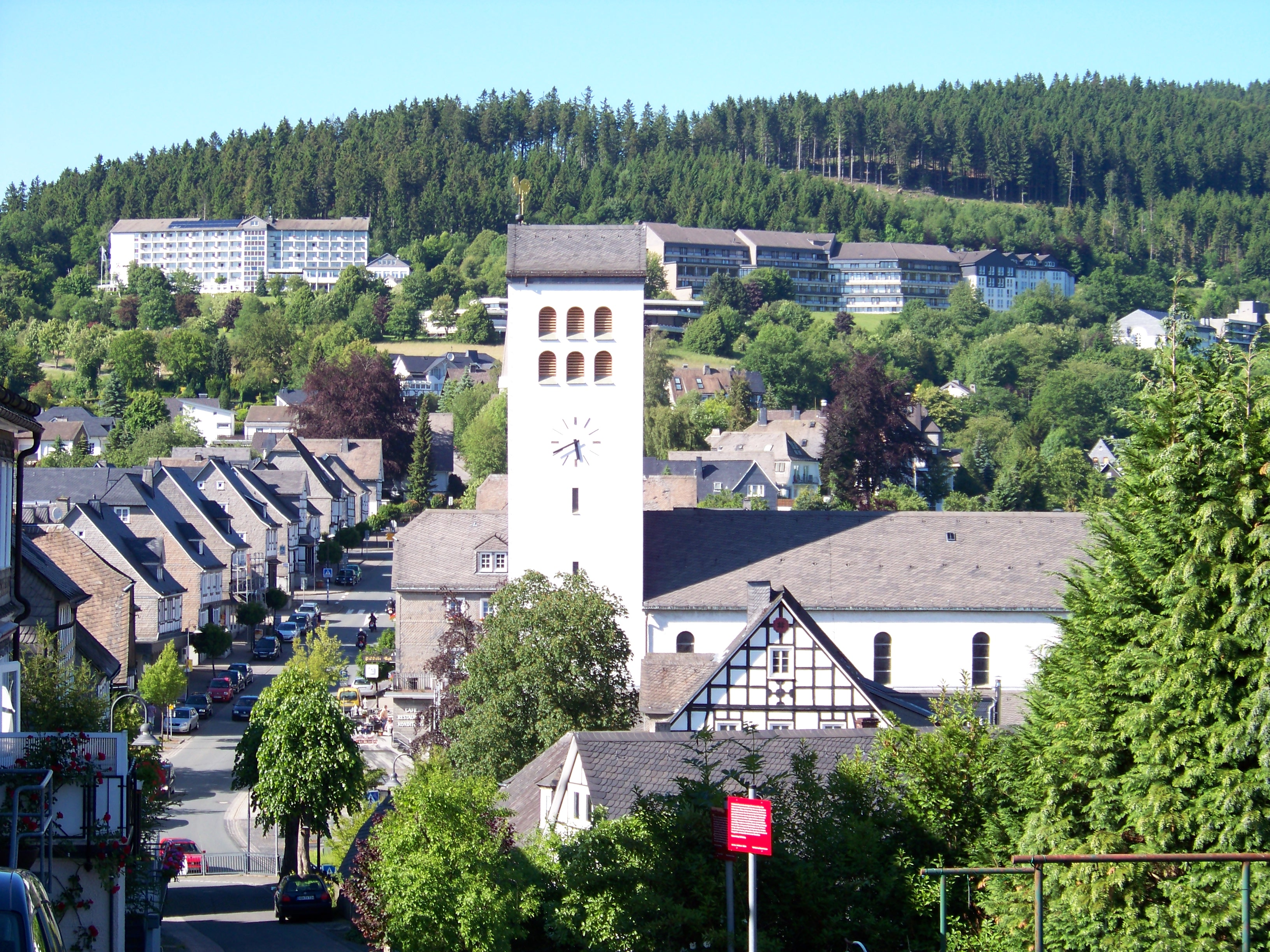

- Flag Coat of arms
- Interactive map of Bad Fredeburg
- Location within Germany Location within North Rhine-Westphalia
- Coordinates: 51°11′29″N 8°18′38″E
- Country: Germany
- State: North Rhine-Westphalia
- Admin. region: Arnsberg
- District: Hochsauerlandkreis
- Town: Schmallenberg

Population (2021-12-31)
  - Total: 3,989
- Time zone: UTC+01:00 (CET)
  - Summer (DST): UTC+02:00 (CEST)

Bad Fredeburg (German pronunciation: [baːt ˈfʁeːdəbʊʁk]) is a locality in the municipality Schmallenberg in the High Sauerland District in North Rhine-Westphalia, Germany.

The village has 3989 inhabitants and lies in the east of the municipality of Schmallenberg at a height of around 448 m. Bad Fredeburg borders on the villages of Altenilpe, Ebbinghof, Gleidorf, Huxel and Rimberg.

== History ==
In the first decades of the 14th century, the Dietrich III. of Bilstein built the "Vredeburg", which was to preserve peace in the country according to the name. The construction of the castle also meant the foundation of the town in front of the castle gates. In a devastating town fire in 1810, the entire old town was destroyed and a new building was built in the upper town.

In the 1975 communal area reforms in the Sauerland and Paderborn the already existing Town of Schmallenberg was merged with the Town of Fredeburg. Bad Fredeburg has been Kneippheilbad since 1995.

== Gallery ==
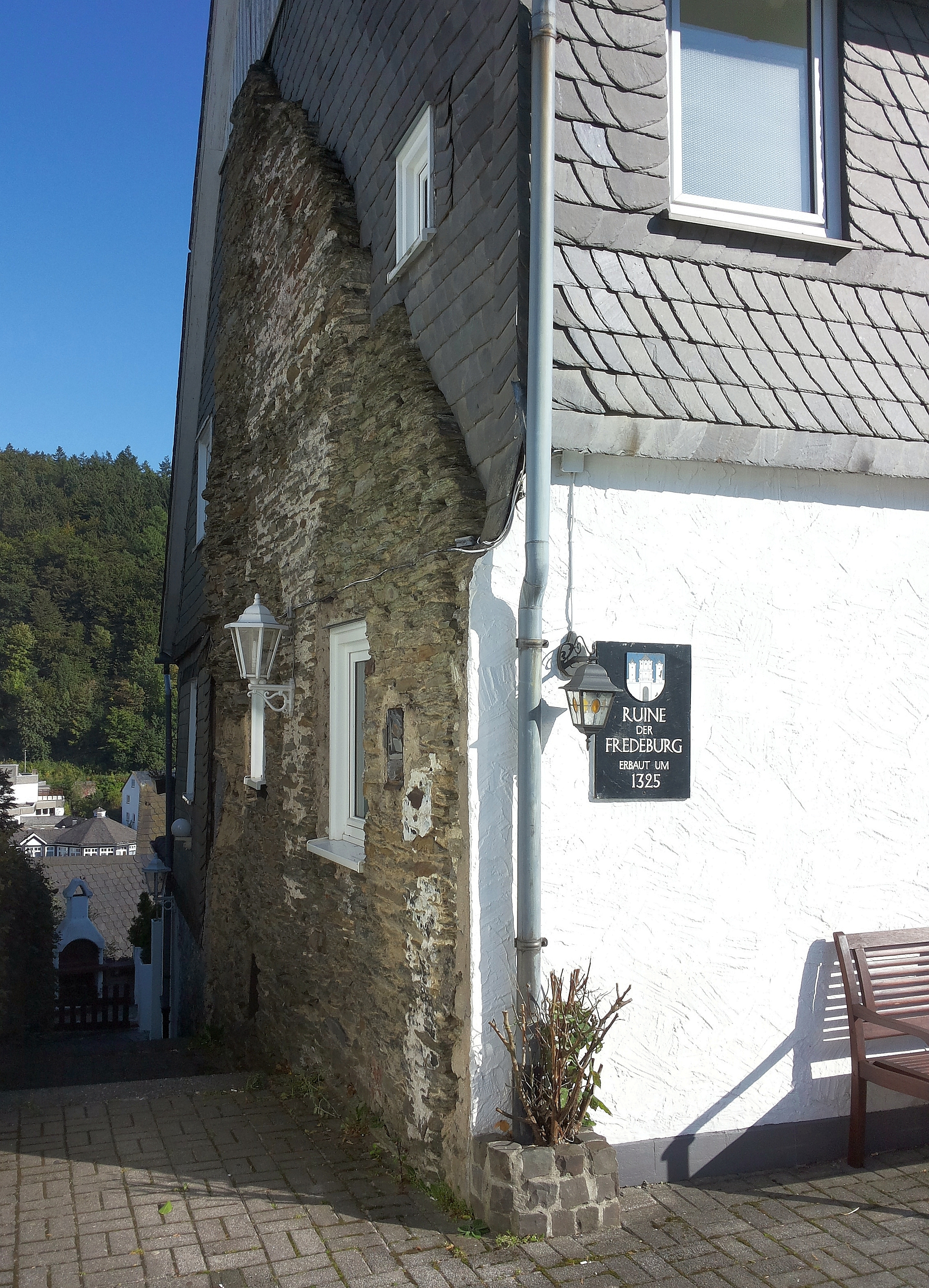
Castle ruin Fredeburg

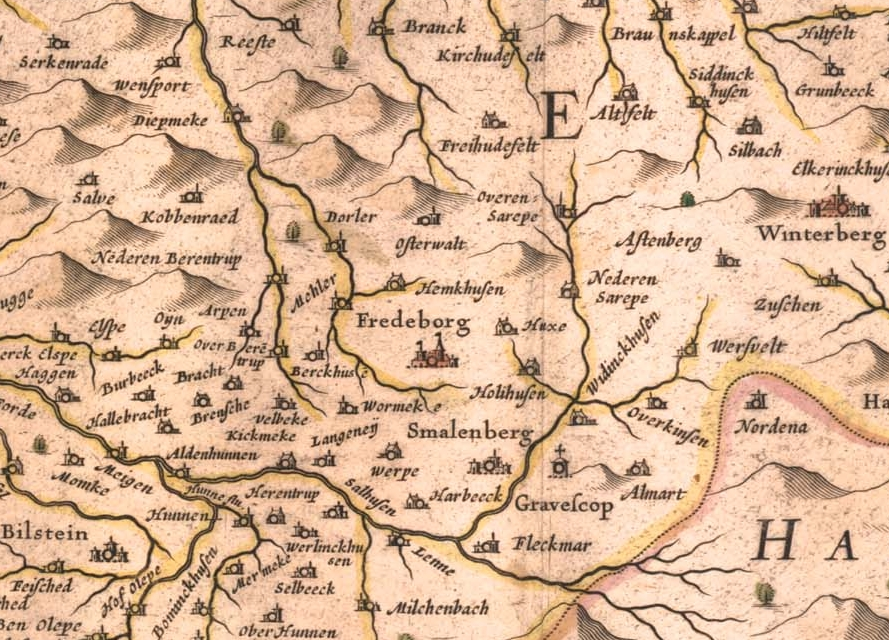
„Fredeborg“ 1645 - Westphalia Ducatus (Duchy of Westphalia)

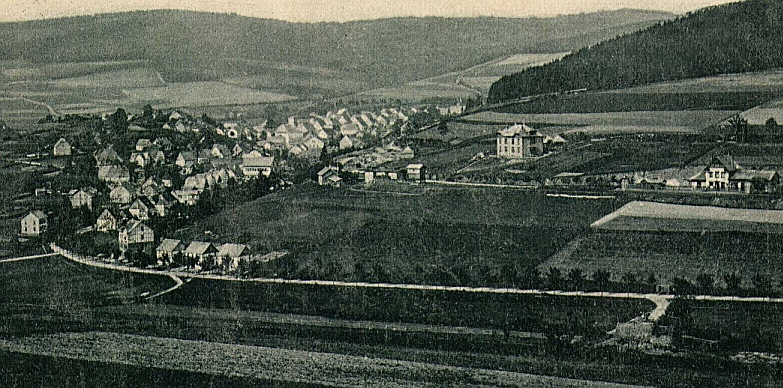
Fredeburg 1910
