= House of Bilstein =

Dynasty in North-Rhine Westphalia

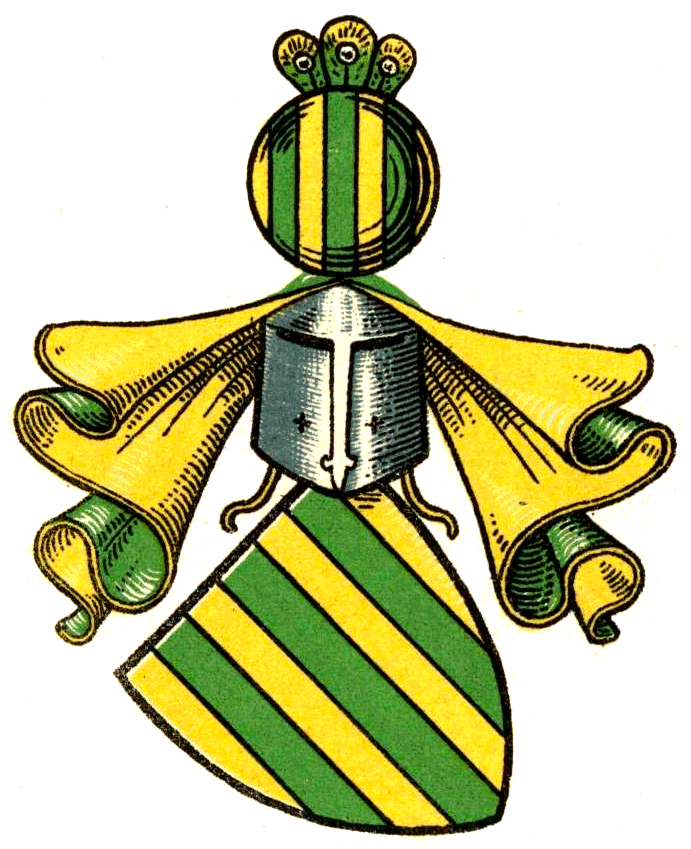
Bilstein family coat of arms

The Bilstein family (German: Edelherren von Bilstein) was a medieval German noble family in what later became the Duchy of Westphalia with an estate (called Land Bilstein) mainly within the present region of Sauerland in Germany. Their family home was at Bilstein Castle in the present-day town of Lennestadt. This Westphalian family of Edelherren should not be confused with the Franconian counts of Bilstein, who held estates on the River Werra and in North Hesse.

== Coat of arms ==
The coat of arms depicts three pales vert on a field or. On the helmet with its green and gold mantling is a golden ball with three green pales and, above it three green peacock feathers.

John I and his son, Dietrich III, of Bilstein used a seal with 3 roses on the shield.

== Municipal coat of arms ==
Coat of arms of the town of Lennestadt

== People ==
=== Regents ===
- Henricus de Vare (Gevore)
- Dietrich I
- Dietrich II
- John I of Bilstein
- Dietrich III
- John II

=== Members of the family ===
- Godfrey of Bilstein
- Henry of Bilstein, Provost of St. Severin's Church in (then) Electorate of Cologne

== Literature ==
- Johann Suibert Seibertz: Diplomatische Familiengeschichte der Dynasten und Herren im Herzogtum Westfalen. Arnsberg, 1855. pp. 1–67 digitalised publication in Seibertz, Landes- und Rechtsgeschichte
