= Gleidorf =

- Stadtteil of Schmallenberg
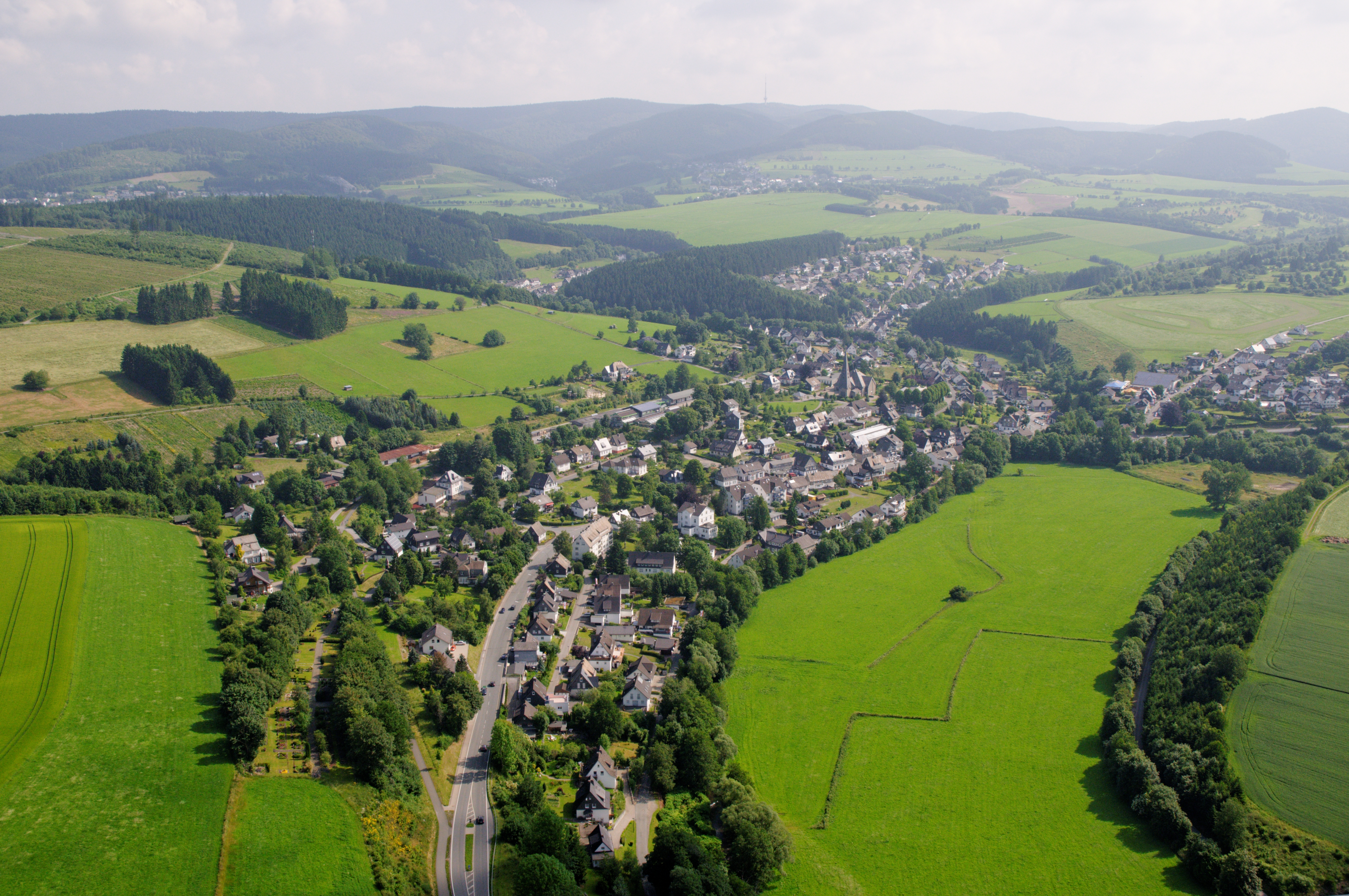

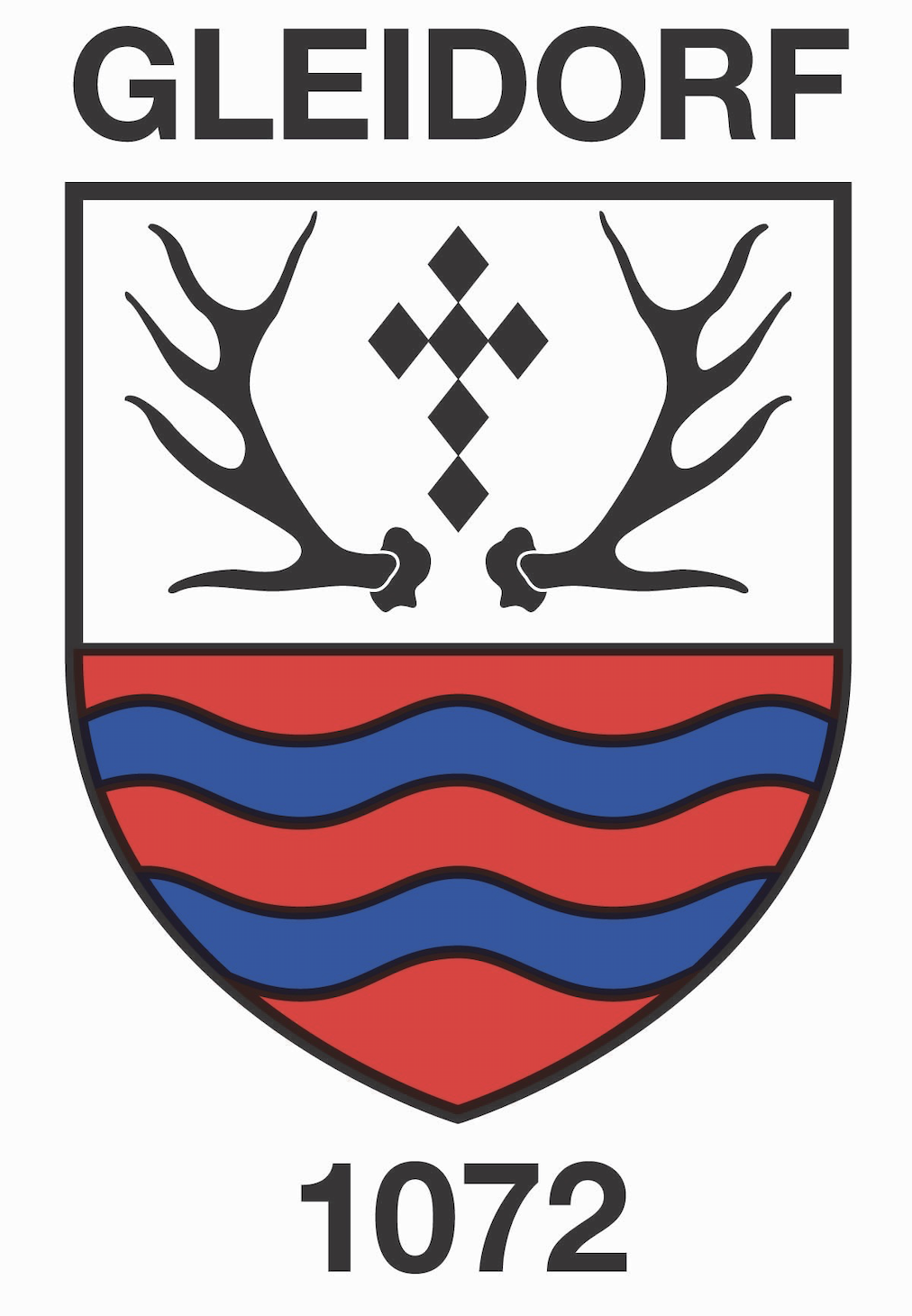
- Coat of arms
- Interactive map of Gleidorf
- Location within Germany Location within North Rhine-Westphalia
- Coordinates: 51°9′52″N 8°18′46″E
- Country: Germany
- State: North Rhine-Westphalia
- Admin. region: Arnsberg
- District: Hochsauerlandkreis
- Town: Schmallenberg

Population (2021-12-31)
  - Total: 1,371
- Time zone: UTC+01:00 (CET)
  - Summer (DST): UTC+02:00 (CEST)

Gleidorf is a locality in the municipality Schmallenberg in the High Sauerland District in North Rhine-Westphalia, Germany.

The village has 1371 inhabitants and lies in the east of the municipality of Schmallenberg at a height of around 393 m. The river Lenne flows through the village. In the village centre the B 236 federal road meets the B 511. Gleidorf borders on the villages of Schmallenberg, Bad Fredeburg, Grafschaft, Holthausen and Winkhausen.

The first written document mentioning Gleidorf dates from 1072 in a charter from Grafschaft Abbey of bishop Anno of Cologne. The village used to belong to the municipality of Grafschaft in Amt Schmallenberg until the end of 1974.

== Gallery ==
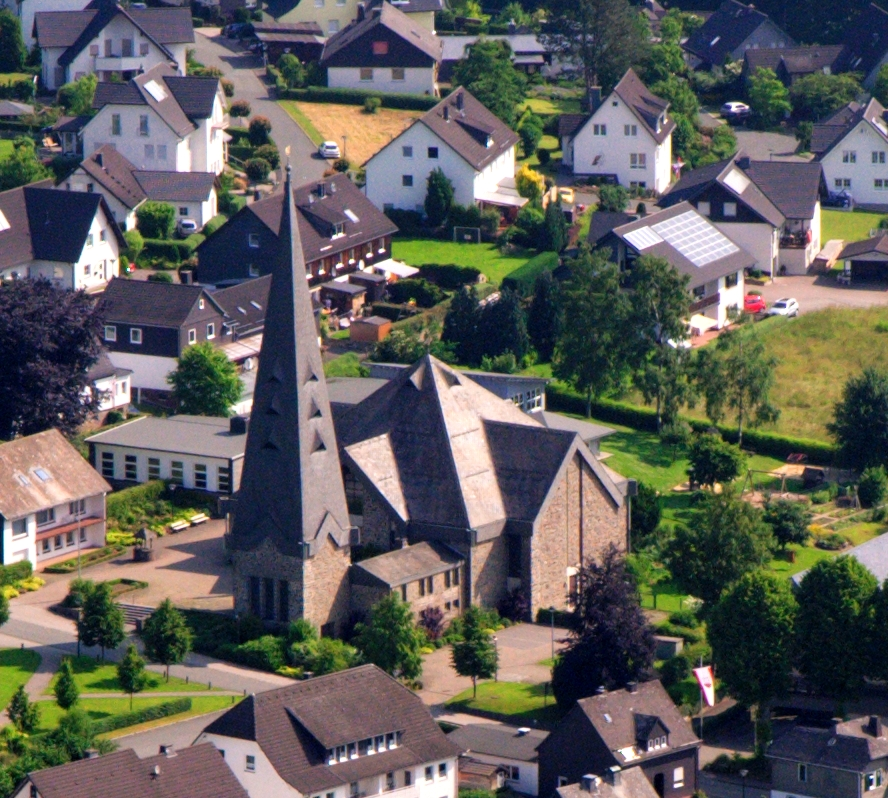
Sacred Heart church

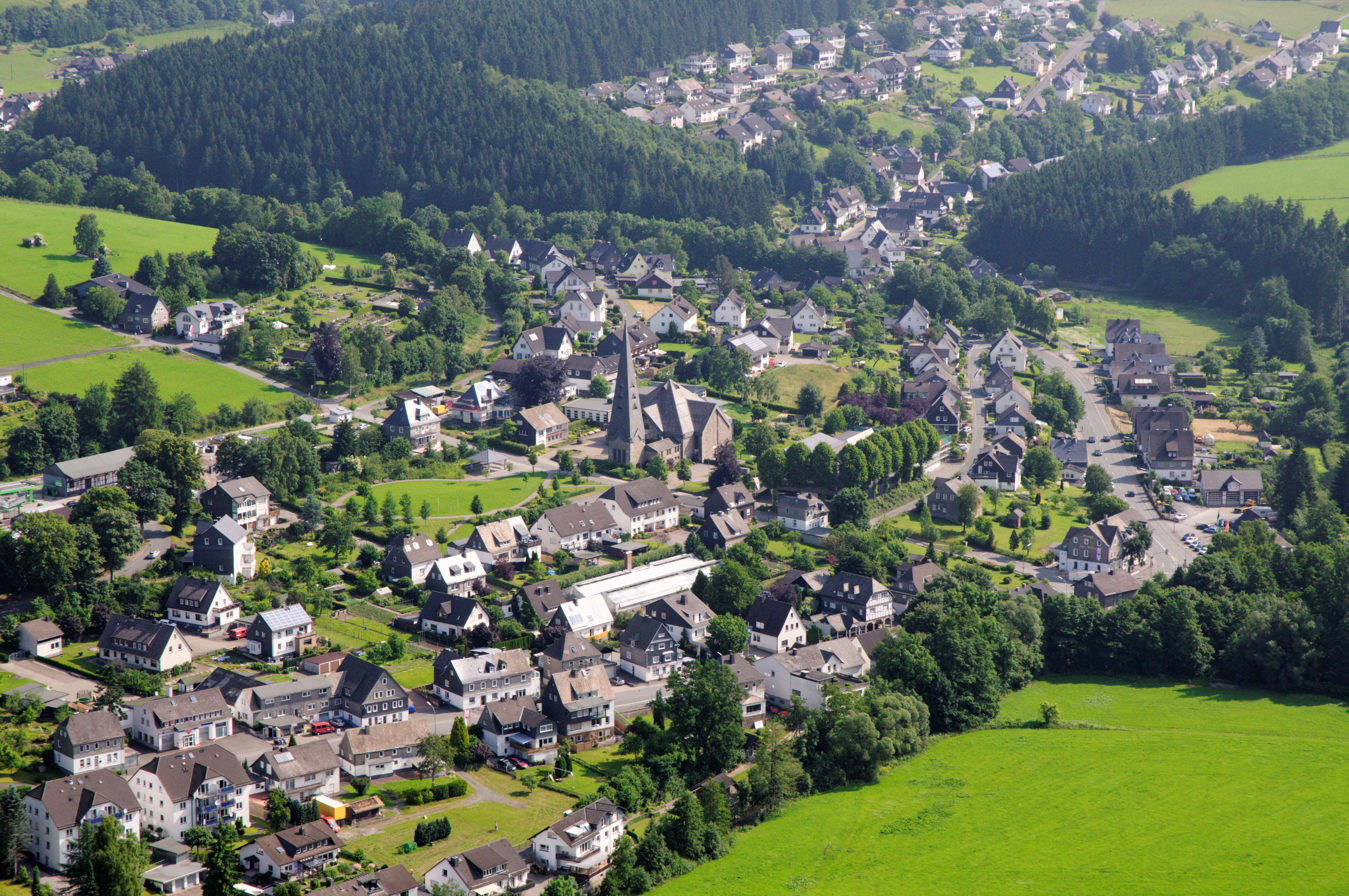
Village center
