= Oberkirchen (Schmallenberg) =

- Stadtteil of Schmallenberg
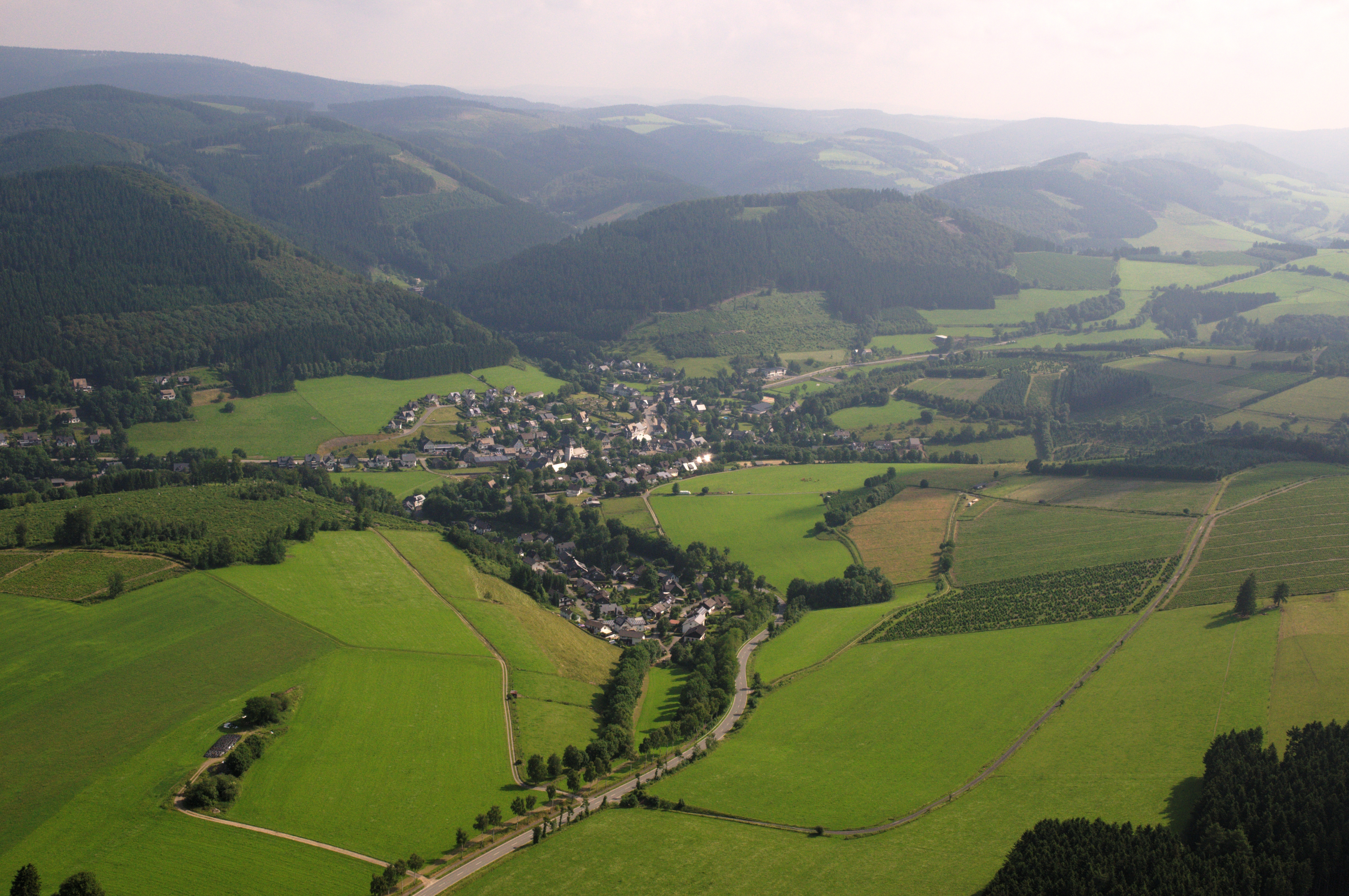

- Coat of arms
- Interactive map of Oberkirchen
- Location within Germany Location within North Rhine-Westphalia
- Coordinates: 51°9′31″N 8°22′22″E
- Country: Germany
- State: North Rhine-Westphalia
- Admin. region: Arnsberg
- District: Hochsauerlandkreis
- Town: Schmallenberg

Population (2021-12-31)
  - Total: 780
- Time zone: UTC+01:00 (CET)
  - Summer (DST): UTC+02:00 (CEST)

Oberkirchen is a locality in the municipality Schmallenberg in the High Sauerland District in North Rhine-Westphalia, Germany.

The village has 780 inhabitants and lies in the east of the municipality of Schmallenberg at a height of around 442 m. The river Lenne flows through the village. In the village centre the Bundesstraße 236 federal road meets the Landesstraße 640. Oberkirchen borders on the villages of Winkhausen, Niedersorpe, Inderlenne, Vorwald and Almert. The village used to belong to the municipality of Oberkirchen in Amt Schmallenberg until the end of 1974.

== Gallery ==
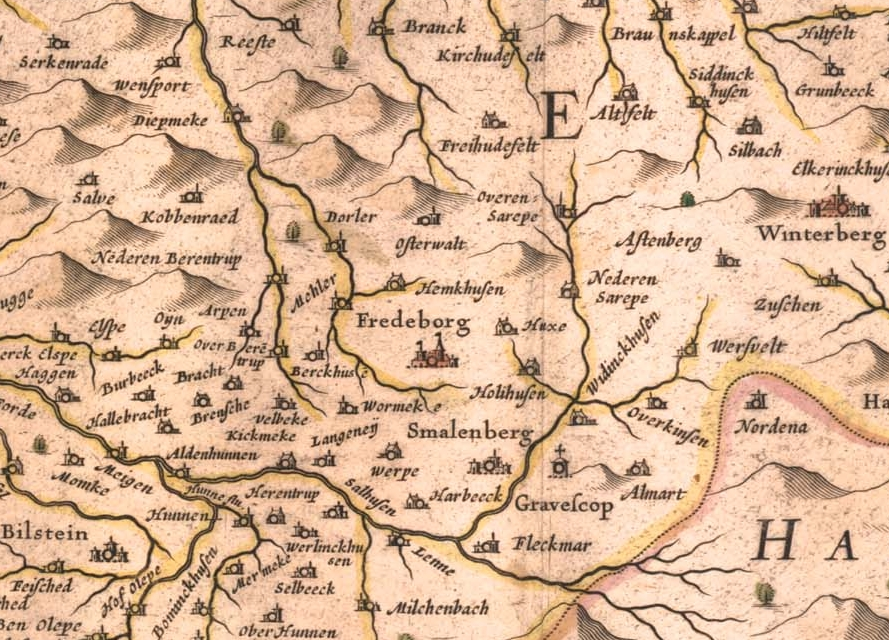
„Overkinsen“ 1645 - Westphalia Ducatus (Duchy of Westphalia)

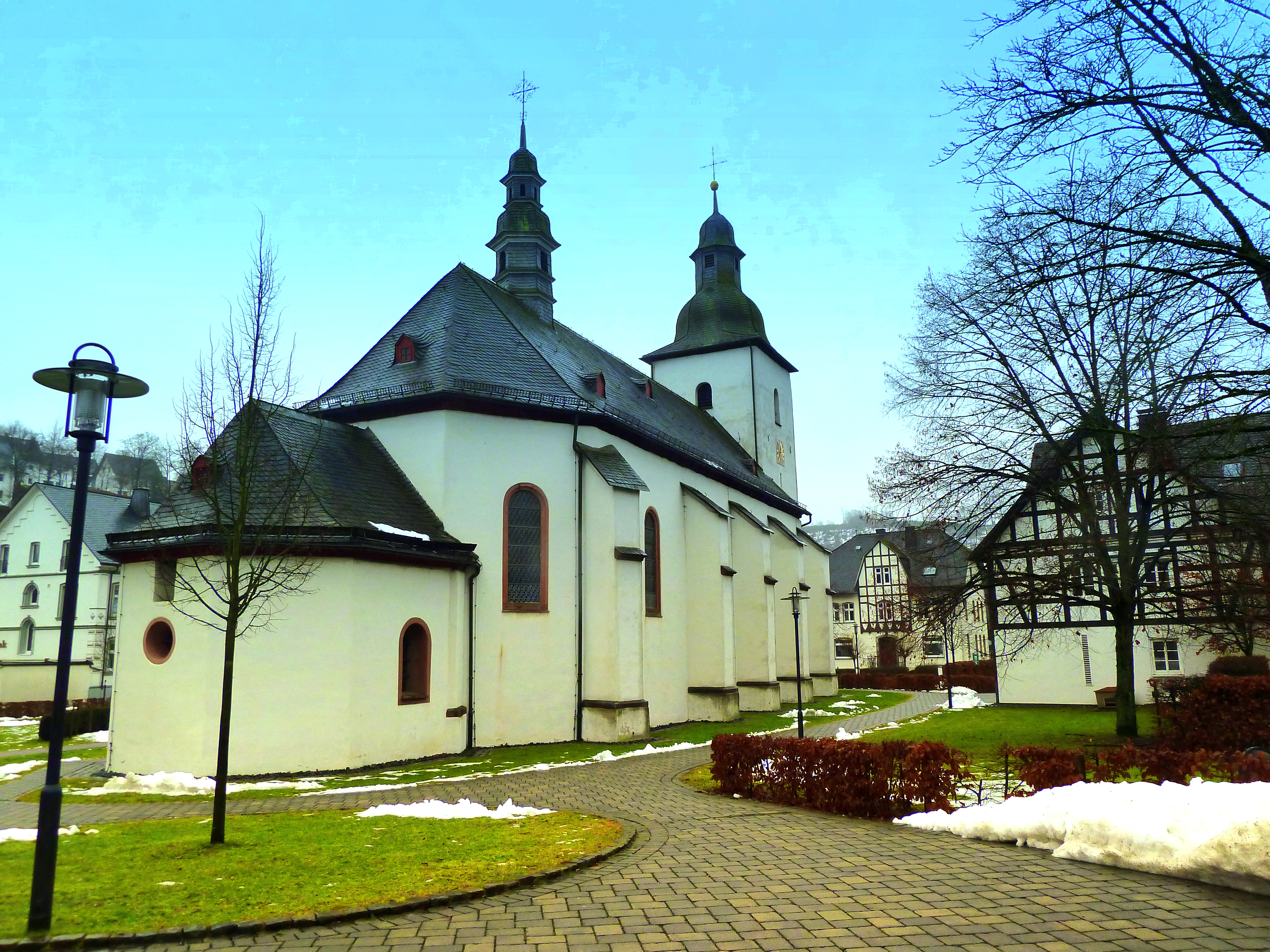
St. Gertrudis Church, Oberkirchen
