= Sorpe (Lenne) =

River in Germany

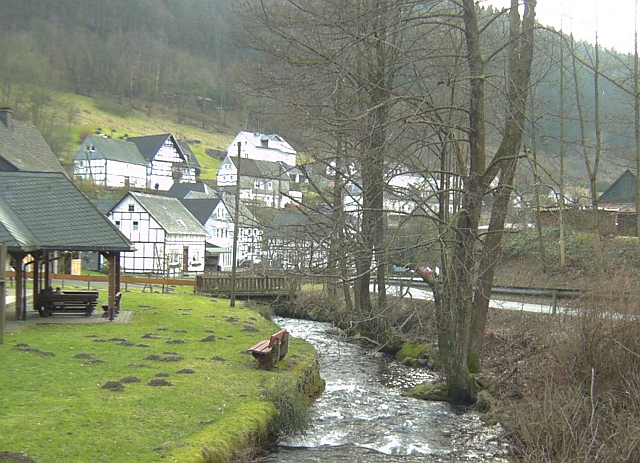

Location
- Country: Germany
- State: North Rhine-Westphalia

Physical characteristics
- Mouth
  - location: Lenne
  - coordinates: 51.1592°N 8.3396°E
- Length: 18.6 km (11.6 mi)

Basin features
- Progression: Lenne→ Ruhr→ Rhine→ North Sea

Sorpe (German pronunciation: [ˈzɔʁpə]) is a river of North Rhine-Westphalia, Germany. It is a right tributary of the Lenne.

== See also ==
- List of rivers of North Rhine-Westphalia
