= Störmecke =

- Stadtteil of Schmallenberg
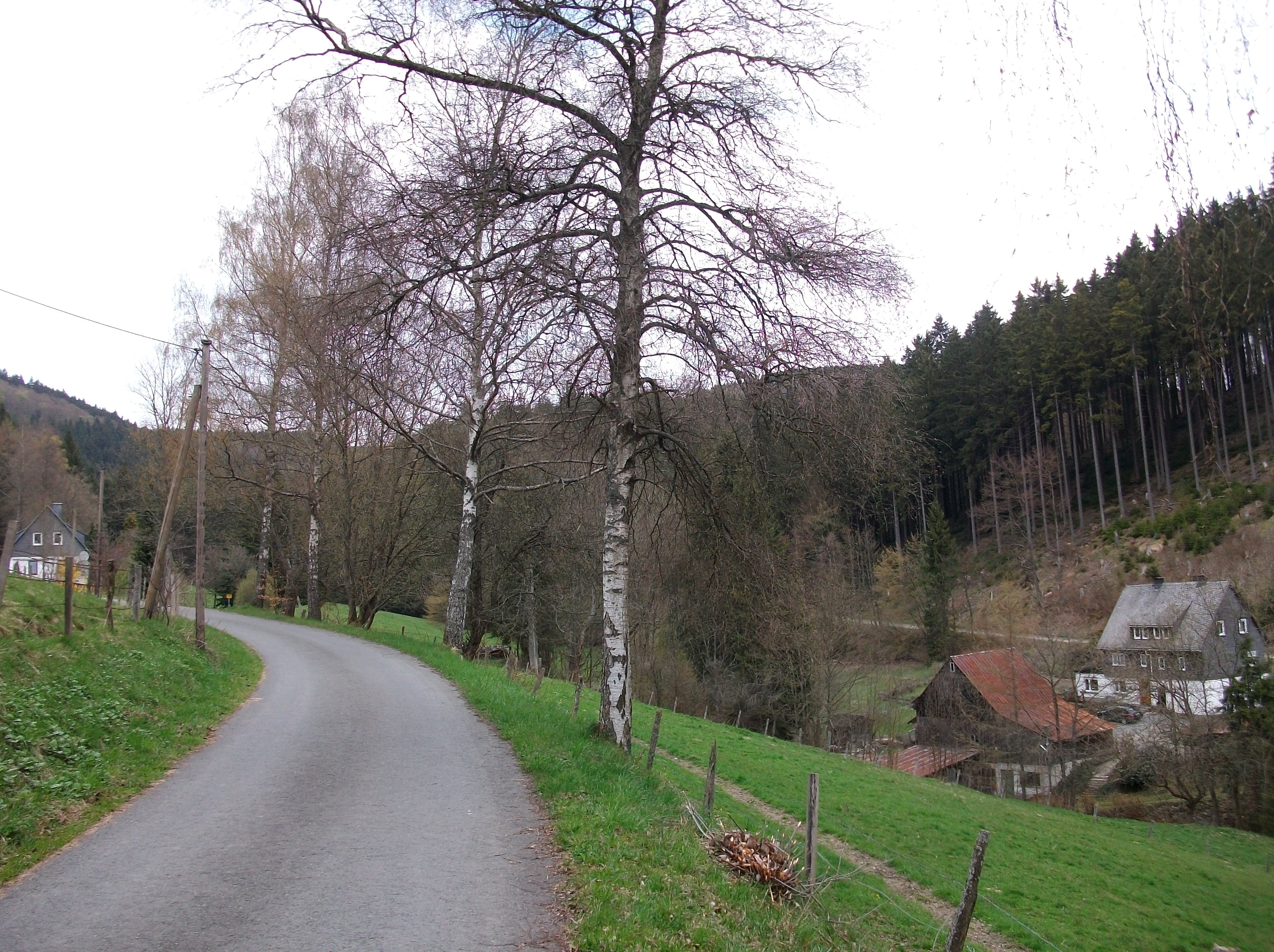
- Interactive map of Störmecke
- Location within Germany Location within North Rhine-Westphalia
- Coordinates: 51°07′11″N 8°20′25″E
- Country: Germany
- State: North Rhine-Westphalia
- Admin. region: Arnsberg
- District: Hochsauerlandkreis
- Town: Schmallenberg

Population (2021-12-31)
  - Total: 4
- Time zone: UTC+01:00 (CET)
  - Summer (DST): UTC+02:00 (CEST)

Störmecke is a locality in the municipality Schmallenberg in the district Hochsauerlandkreis in North Rhine-Westphalia, Germany.

The hamlet has 4 inhabitants and located almost seven kilometres southeast of the Schmallenberg city centre. Störmecke borders on the villages of Latrop, Schanze, Grafschaft and Kühhude.
