= Fleckenberg =

- Stadtteil of Schmallenberg
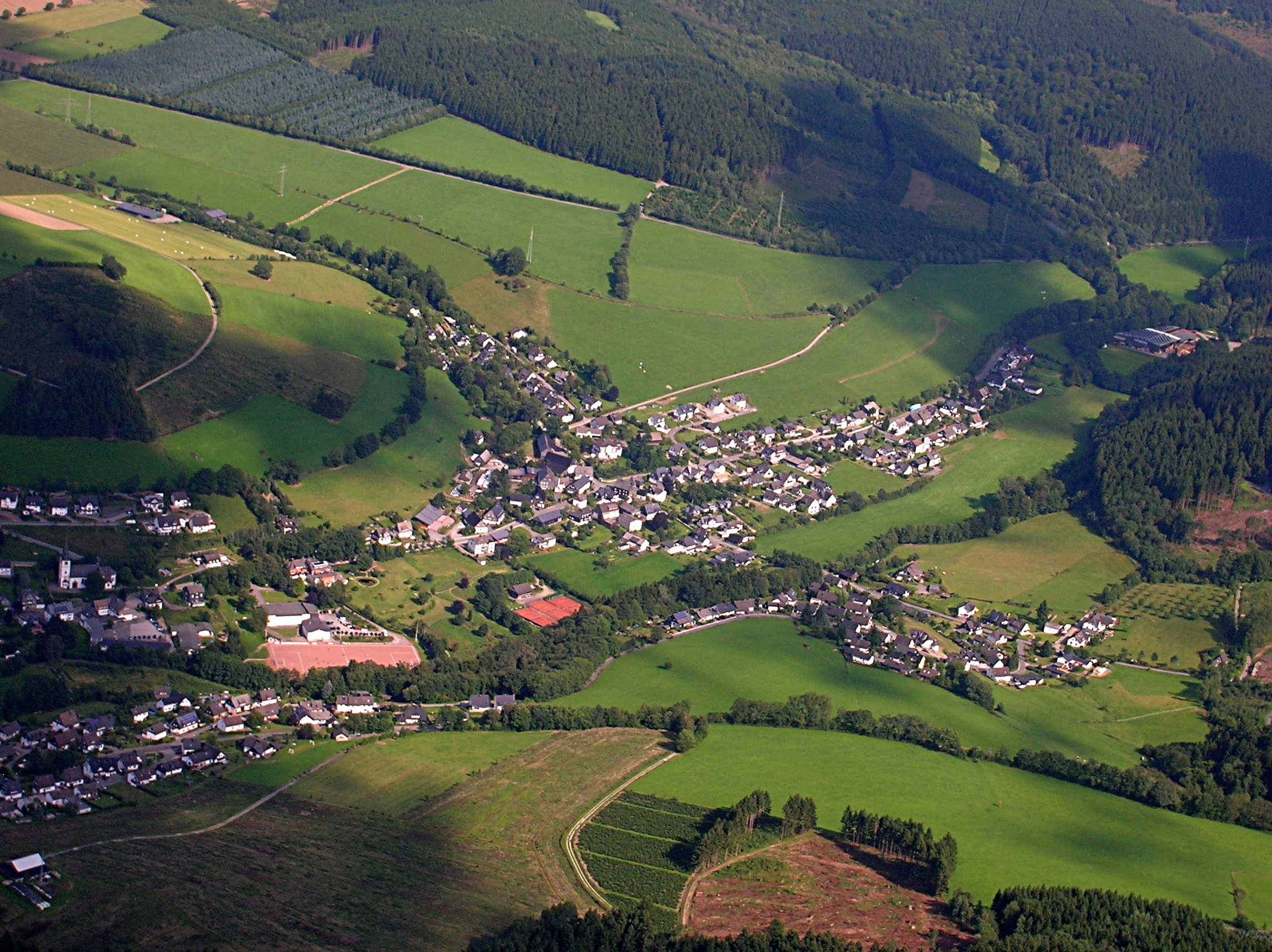

- Coat of arms
- Interactive map of Fleckenberg
- Location within Germany Location within North Rhine-Westphalia
- Coordinates: 51°8′08″N 8°15′38″E
- Country: Germany
- State: North Rhine-Westphalia
- Admin. region: Arnsberg
- District: Hochsauerlandkreis
- Town: Schmallenberg

Population (2021-12-31)
  - Total: 1,544
- Time zone: UTC+01:00 (CET)
  - Summer (DST): UTC+02:00 (CEST)

Fleckenberg is a locality in the municipality Schmallenberg in the district Hochsauerlandkreis in North Rhine-Westphalia, Germany.

The village has 1544 inhabitants and lies in the west of the municipality of Schmallenberg at a height of around 354 m on the Bundesstraße 236. The river Latrop flows in Fleckenberg in the river Lenne.

Fleckenberg borders on the villages of Schmallenberg, Jagdhaus, Waidmannsruh, Wulwesort, Latrop, Harbecke, Werpe and Lenne.

== Gallery ==
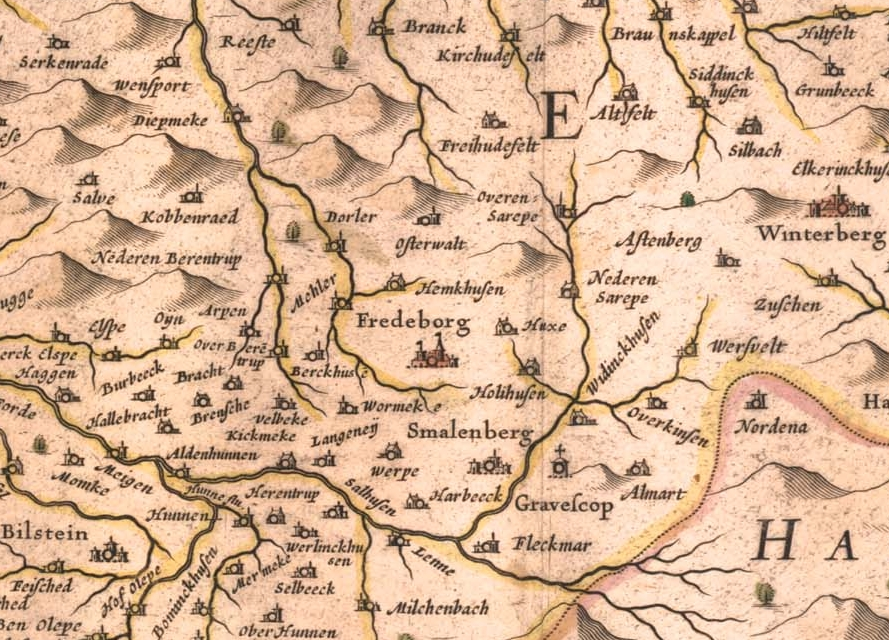
„Fleckmar“ 1645 - Westphalia Ducatus (Duchy of Westphalia)

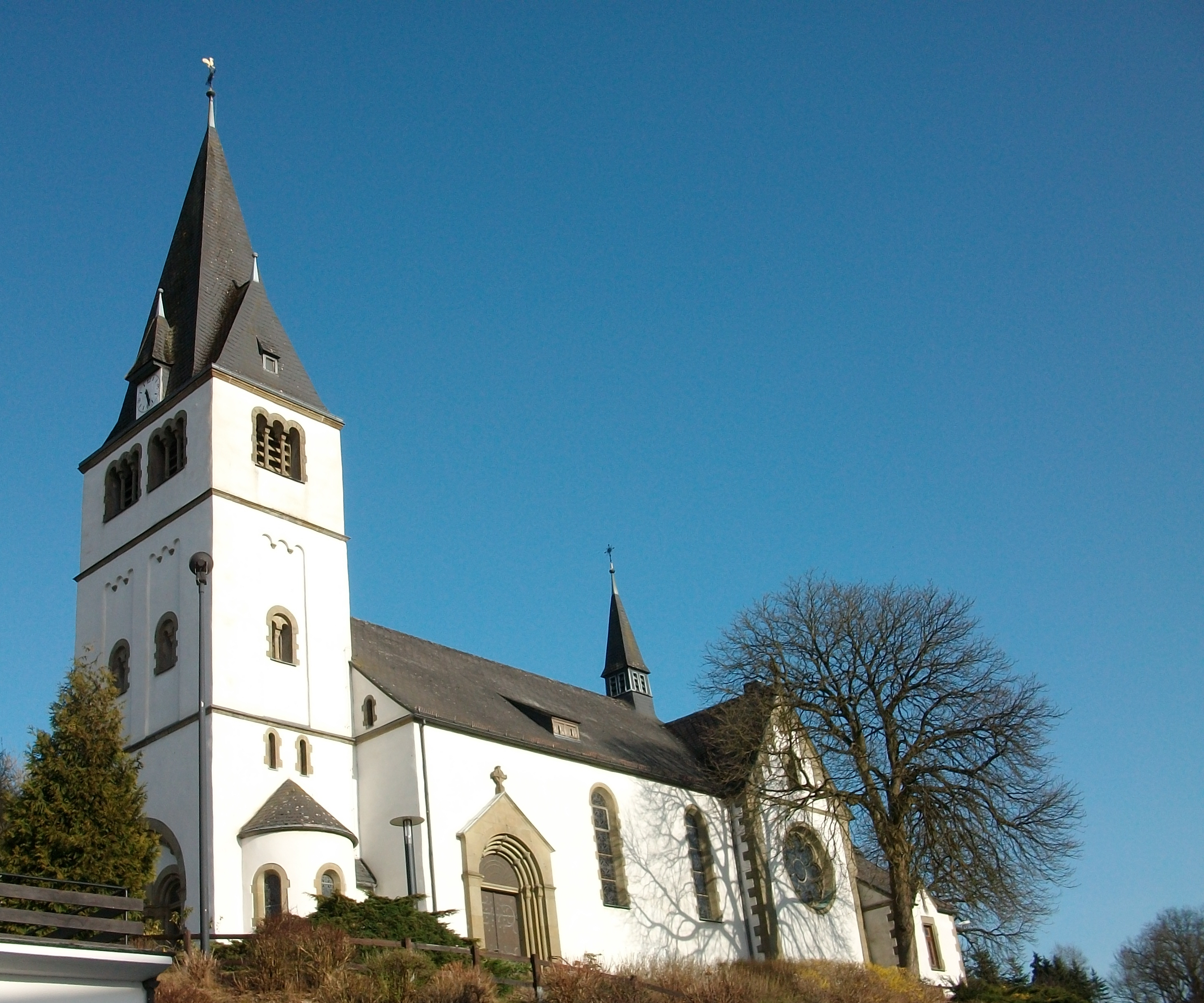
Saint Anthony the Great Church, Fleckenberg

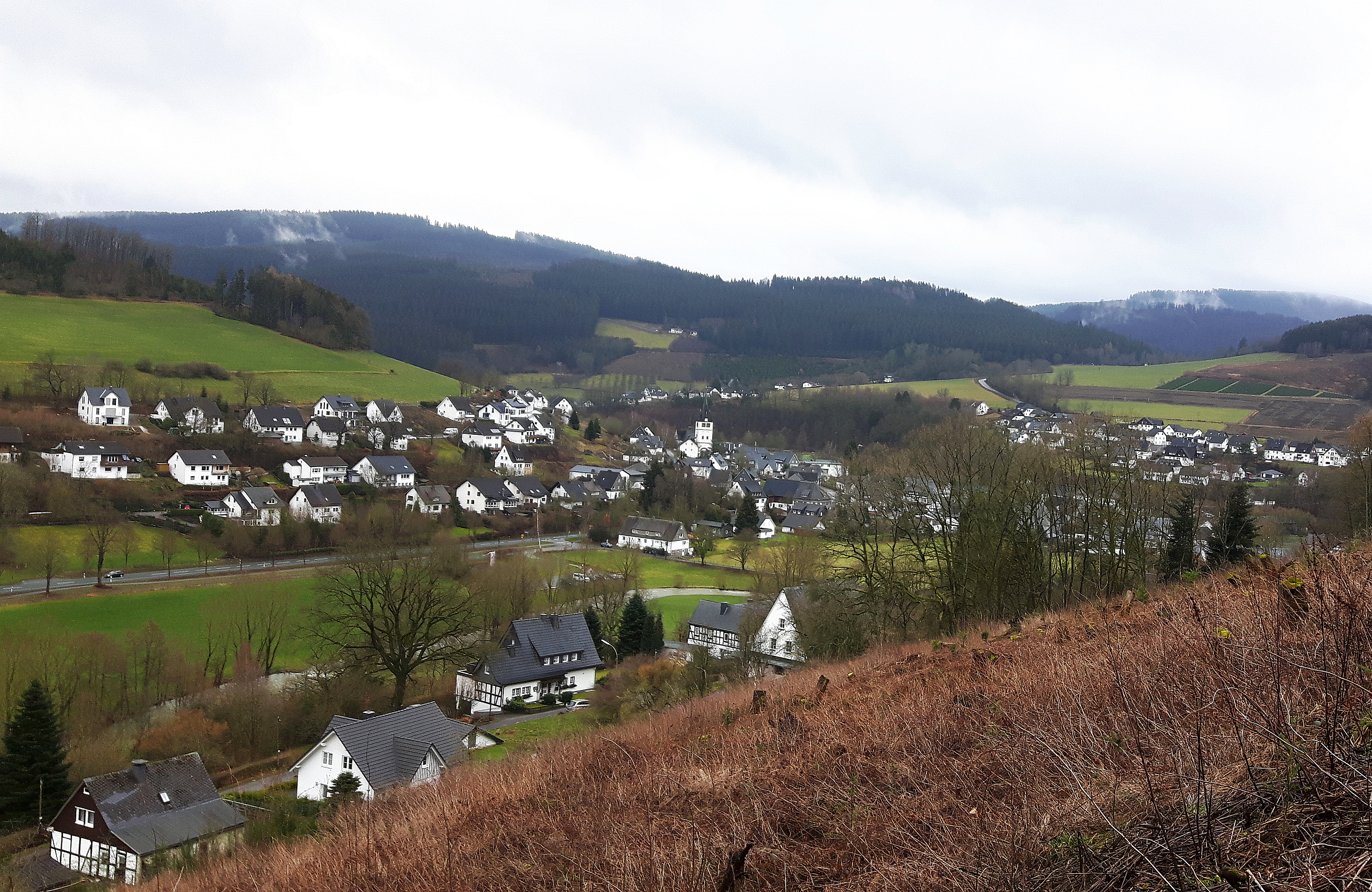
Fleckenberg, 2019
