= Latrop (Schmallenberg) =

- Stadtteil of Schmallenberg
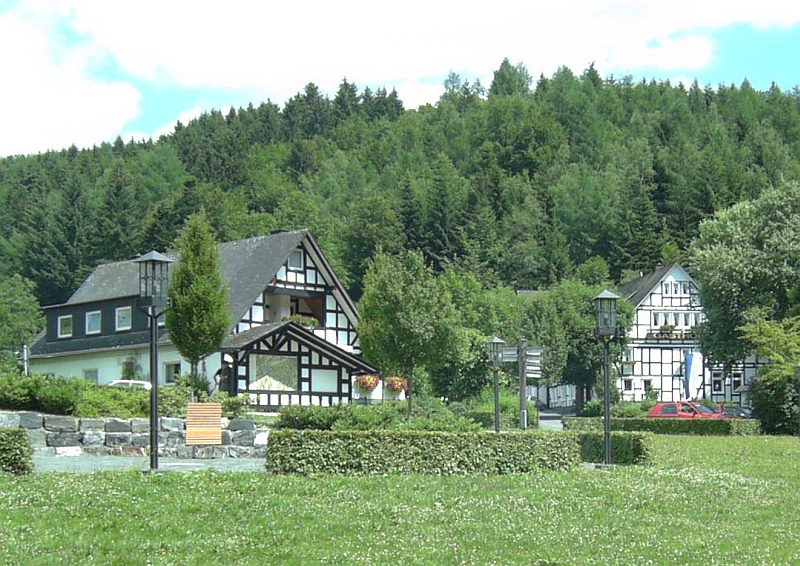
- Interactive map of Latrop
- Location within Germany Location within North Rhine-Westphalia
- Coordinates: 51°6′44″N 8°19′34″E
- Country: Germany
- State: North Rhine-Westphalia
- Admin. region: Arnsberg
- District: Hochsauerlandkreis
- Town: Schmallenberg
- Elevation: 430 m (1,410 ft)

Population (2021-12-31)
  - Total: 176
- Time zone: UTC+01:00 (CET)
  - Summer (DST): UTC+02:00 (CEST)

Latrop is a locality in the municipality Schmallenberg in the High Sauerland District in North Rhine-Westphalia, Germany.

The village has 176 inhabitants and lies in the south of the municipality of Schmallenberg at a height of around 430 m. The river Latrop flows through the village. Latrop borders on the villages of Grafschaft, Störmecke, Schanze, Jagdhaus, Waidmannsruh and Fleckenberg.

In 1257 a Johannes von Latroph was named for the first time in a document. The village used to belong to the municipality of Grafschaft in Amt Schmallenberg until the end of 1974.

Latrop was awarded gold for its beauty in the national competition “Our village has a future”.

== Gallery ==
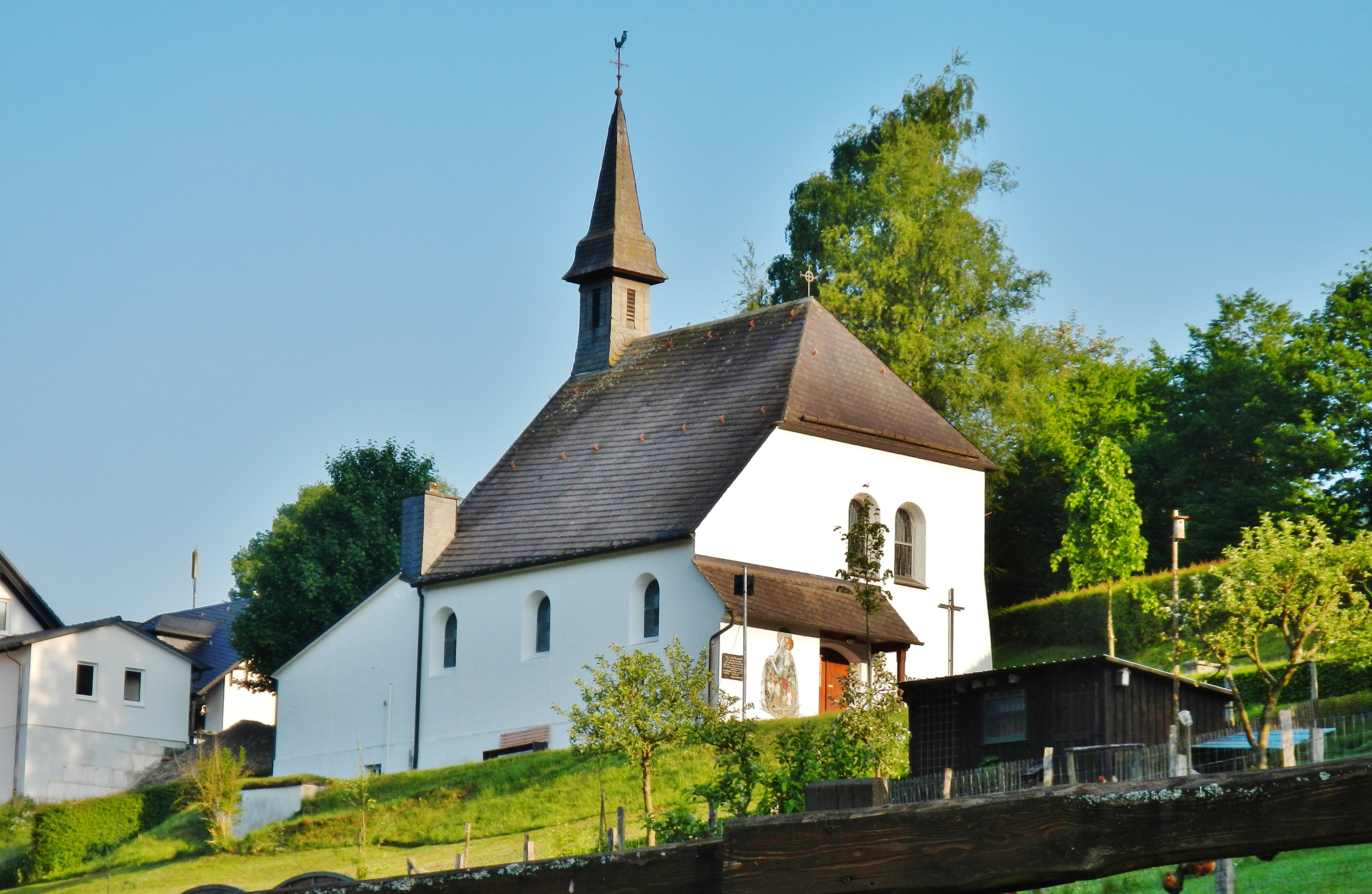
Chapel St. Josef

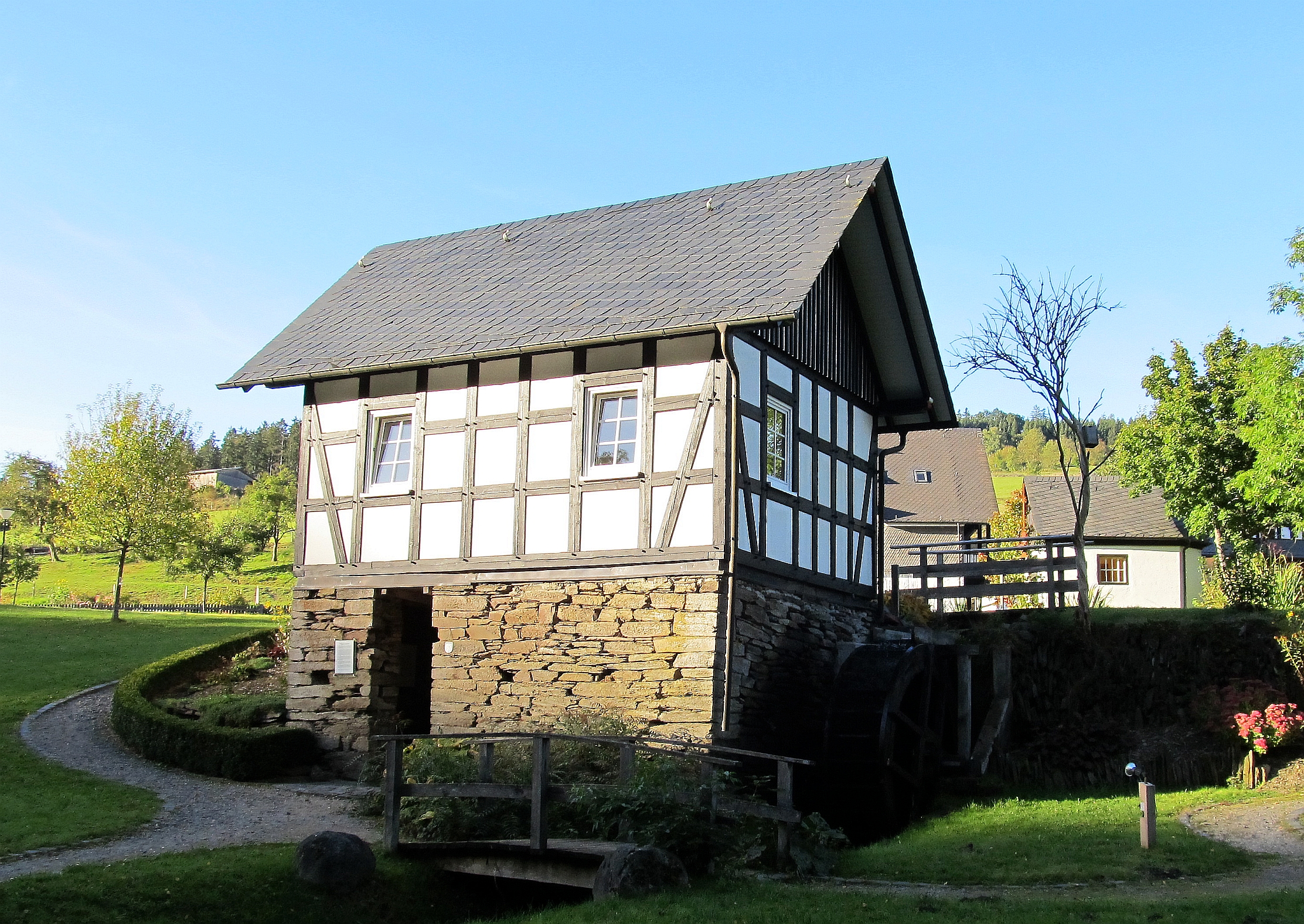
Old watermill

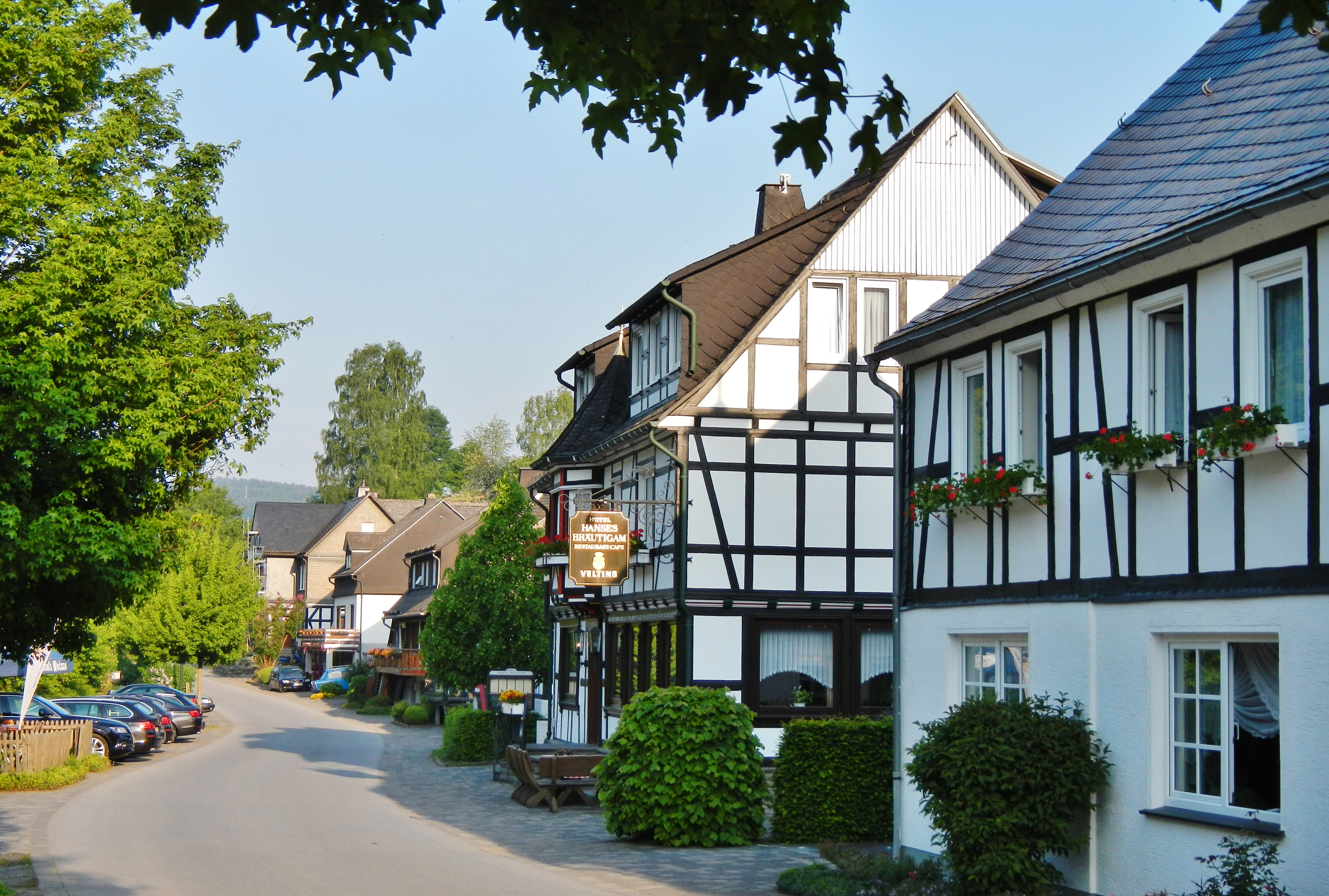
Street in Latrop

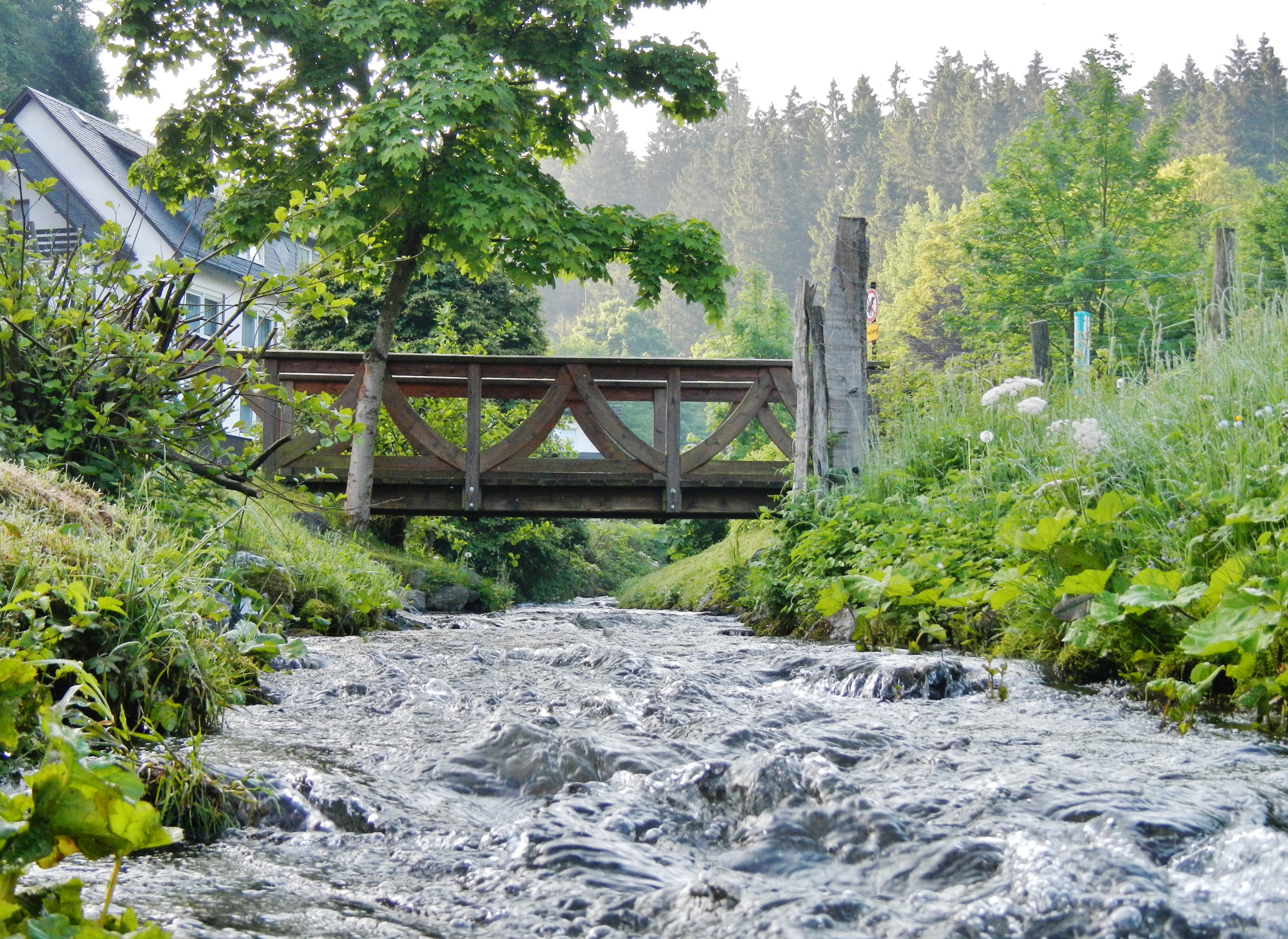
River Latrop
