= Latrop =

River in Germany

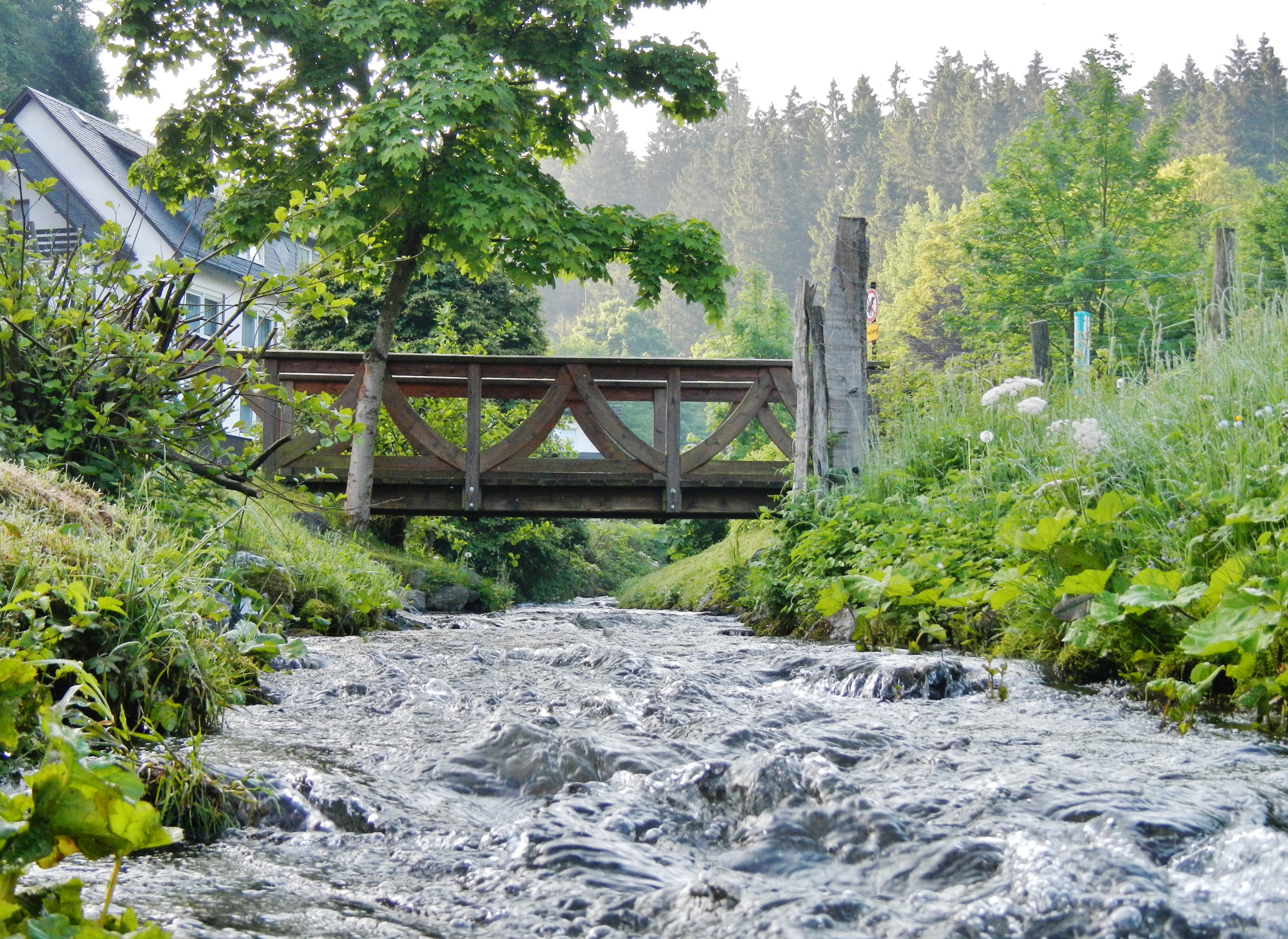
- Latrop river in the town of Latrop

Location
- Country: Germany
- State: North Rhine-Westphalia

Physical characteristics
- Mouth
  - location: Lenne
  - coordinates: 51.1350°N 8.2584°E
- Length: 11.0 km (6.8 mi)

Basin features
- Progression: Lenne→ Ruhr→ Rhine→ North Sea

The Latrop is a river of North Rhine-Westphalia, Germany. It flows from the village of Latrop to Waidmannsruh and in Fleckenberg into the Lenne from the left bank.

== See also ==
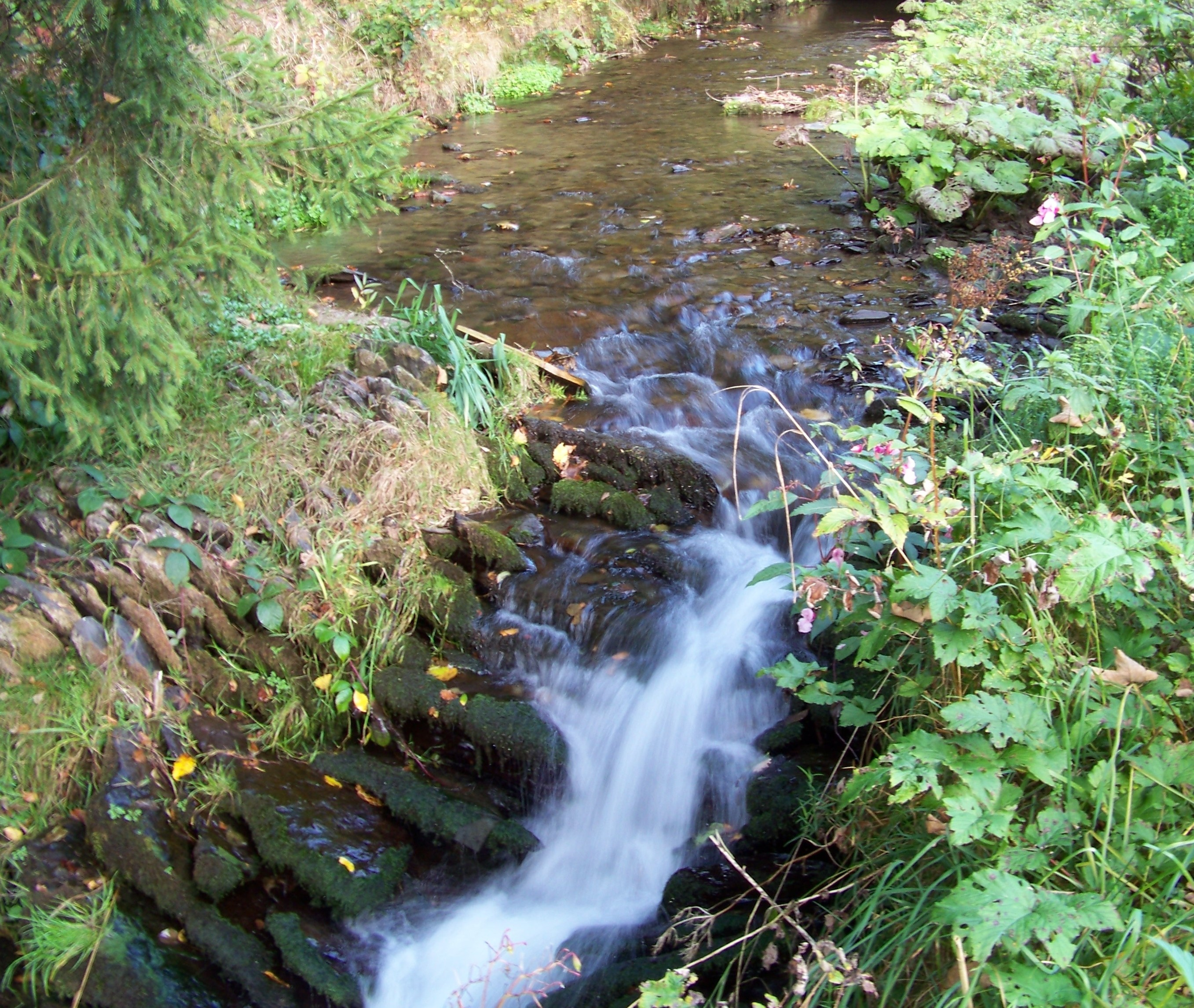
The Latrop by Waidmannsruh

- List of rivers of North Rhine-Westphalia
