= Arpe (Schmallenberg) =

- Stadtteil of Schmallenberg
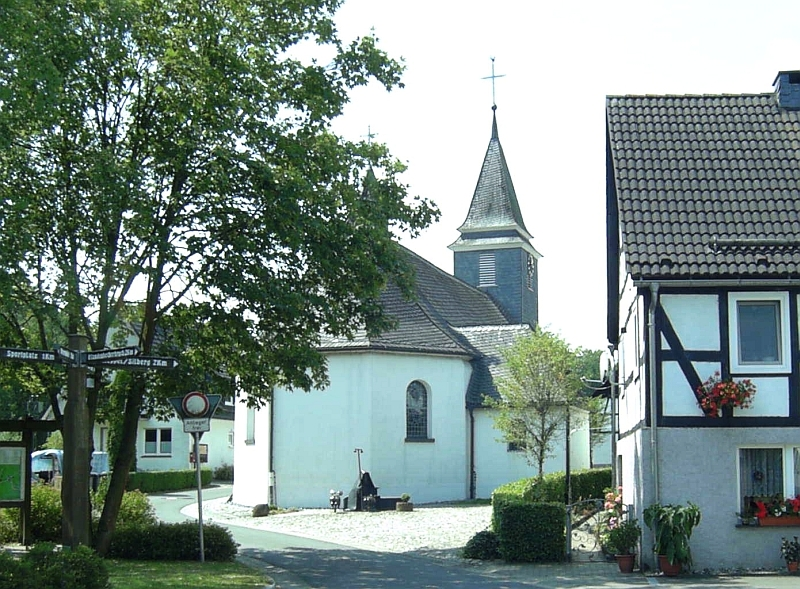
- Interactive map of Arpe
- Location within Germany Location within North Rhine-Westphalia
- Coordinates: 51°11′3″N 8°12′4″E
- Country: Germany
- State: North Rhine-Westphalia
- Admin. region: Arnsberg
- District: Hochsauerlandkreis
- Town: Schmallenberg

Population (2021-12-31)
  - Total: 239
- Time zone: UTC+01:00 (CET)
  - Summer (DST): UTC+02:00 (CEST)

Arpe is a locality in the municipality Schmallenberg in the High Sauerland District in North Rhine-Westphalia, Germany.

The village has 239 inhabitants and lies in the northwest of the municipality of Schmallenberg at a height of around 368 m on the Kreisstraße 35. In the village centre the river Mühlenbach and Heimke flows in the river Arpe.

Arpe borders on the villages of Niederberndorf, Oberberndorf, Selkentrop, Kückelheim, Herschede, Silberg, Keppel and Landenbeckerbruch. The St. Antonius Chapel in the village center was first mentioned in 17th century.

The village used to belong to the municipality of Berghausen in Amt Schmallenberg until the end of 1974.

== Gallery ==
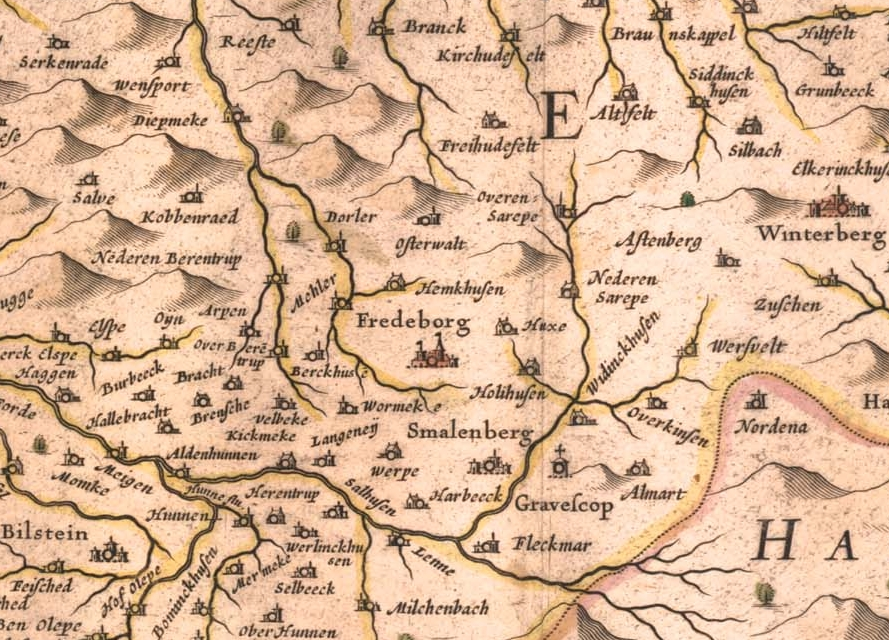
„Arpen“ 1645 - Westphalia Ducatus (Duchy of Westphalia)

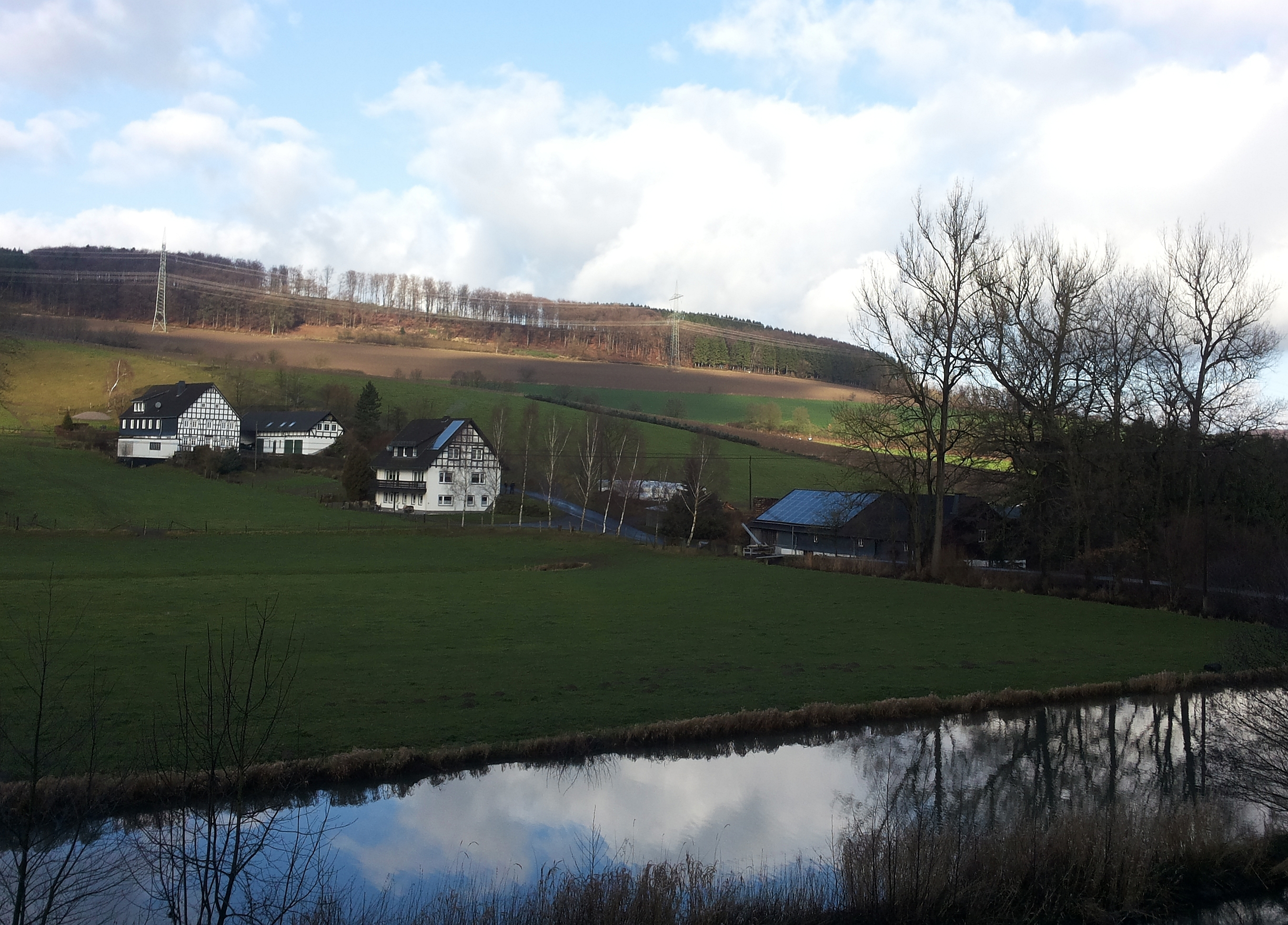
Arpe Mühle
