= Landenbeckerbruch =

- Stadtteil of Schmallenberg
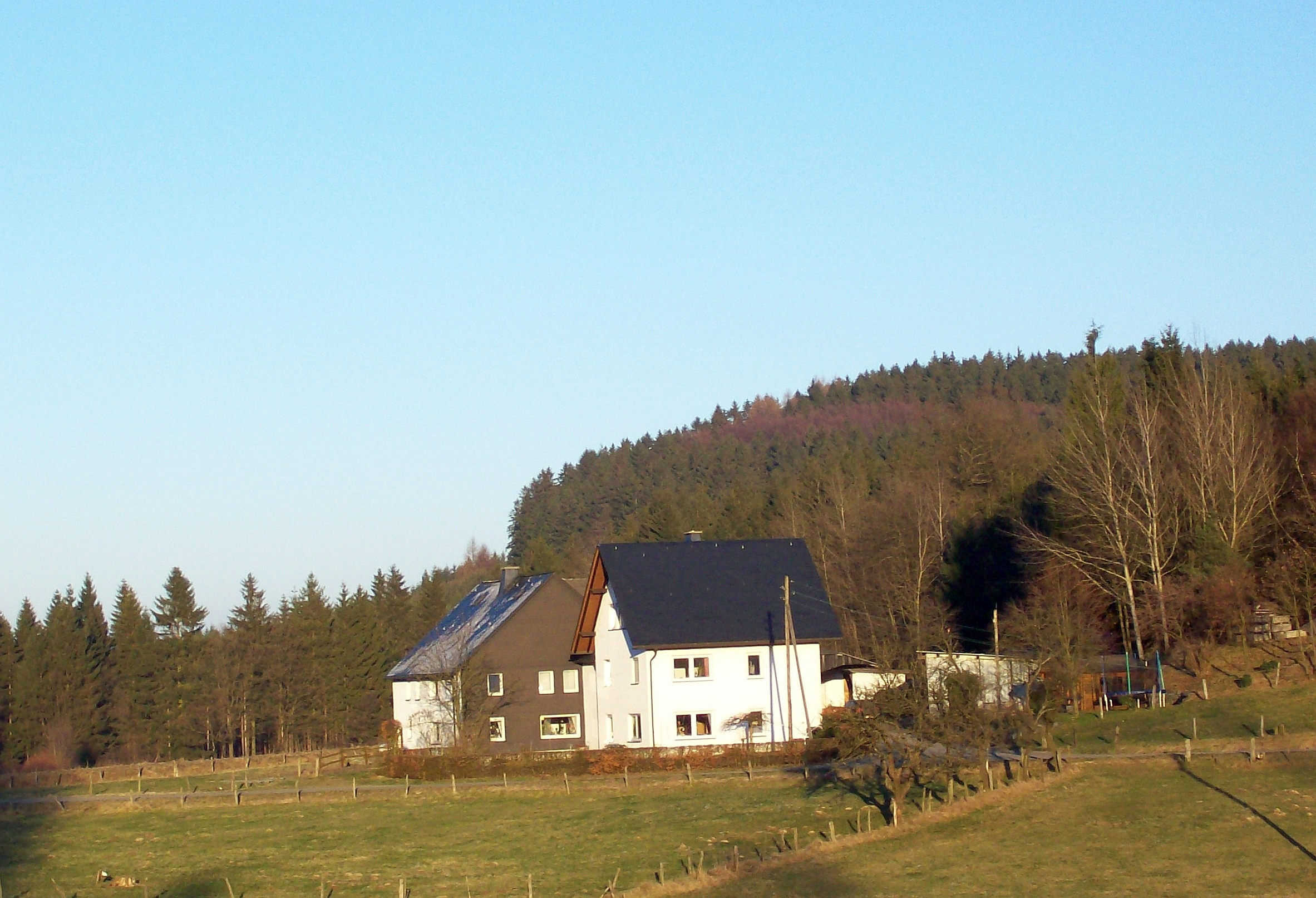
- Interactive map of Landenbeckerbruch
- Location within Germany Location within North Rhine-Westphalia
- Coordinates: 51°11′47″N 8°11′45″E
- Country: Germany
- State: North Rhine-Westphalia
- Admin. region: Arnsberg
- District: Hochsauerlandkreis
- Town: Schmallenberg

Population (2021-12-31)
  - Total: 3
- Time zone: UTC+01:00 (CET)
  - Summer (DST): UTC+02:00 (CEST)

Landenbeckerbruch is a locality in the municipality Schmallenberg in the district Hochsauerlandkreis in North Rhine-Westphalia, Germany.

The hamlet has 3 inhabitants and lies in the west of the municipality of Schmallenberg at a height of around 430 m. Landenbeckerbruch borders on the villages of Keppel, Arpe, Niederberndorf and Niederlandenbeck.
