= Kückelheim =

- Stadtteil of Schmallenberg
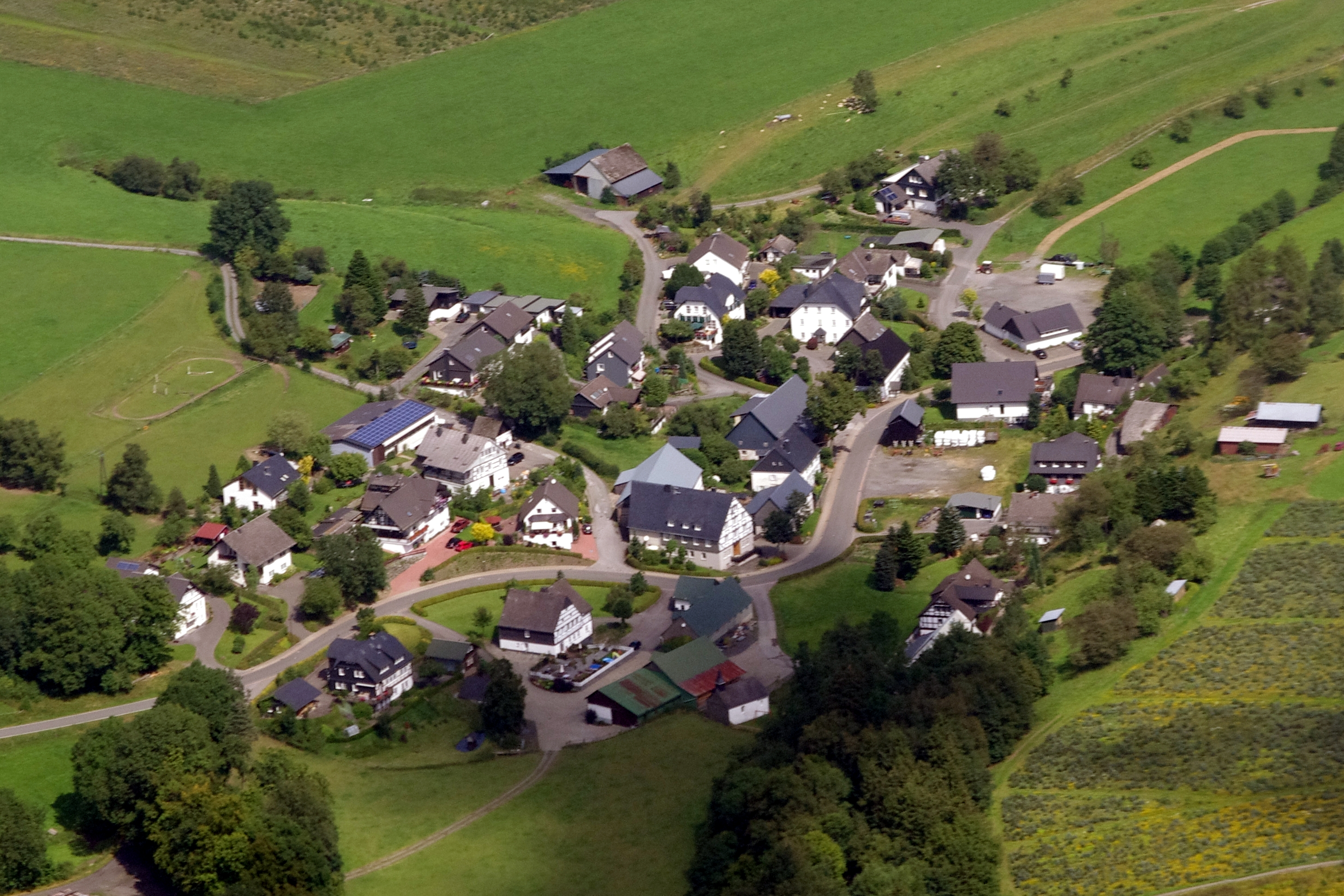
- Interactive map of Kückelheim
- Location within Germany Location within North Rhine-Westphalia
- Coordinates: 51°11′33″N 8°11′40″E
- Country: Germany
- State: North Rhine-Westphalia
- Admin. region: Arnsberg
- District: Hochsauerlandkreis
- Town: Schmallenberg

Population (2021-12-31)
  - Total: 83
- Time zone: UTC+01:00 (CET)
  - Summer (DST): UTC+02:00 (CEST)

Kückelheim is a locality in the municipality Schmallenberg in the district Hochsauerlandkreis in North Rhine-Westphalia, Germany.

The village has 83 inhabitants and lies in the west of the municipality of Schmallenberg at a height of around 390 m. Kückelheim borders on the villages of Arpe, Bracht, Selkentrop and Werntrop.
