= Steinsieksbach =

River in Germany

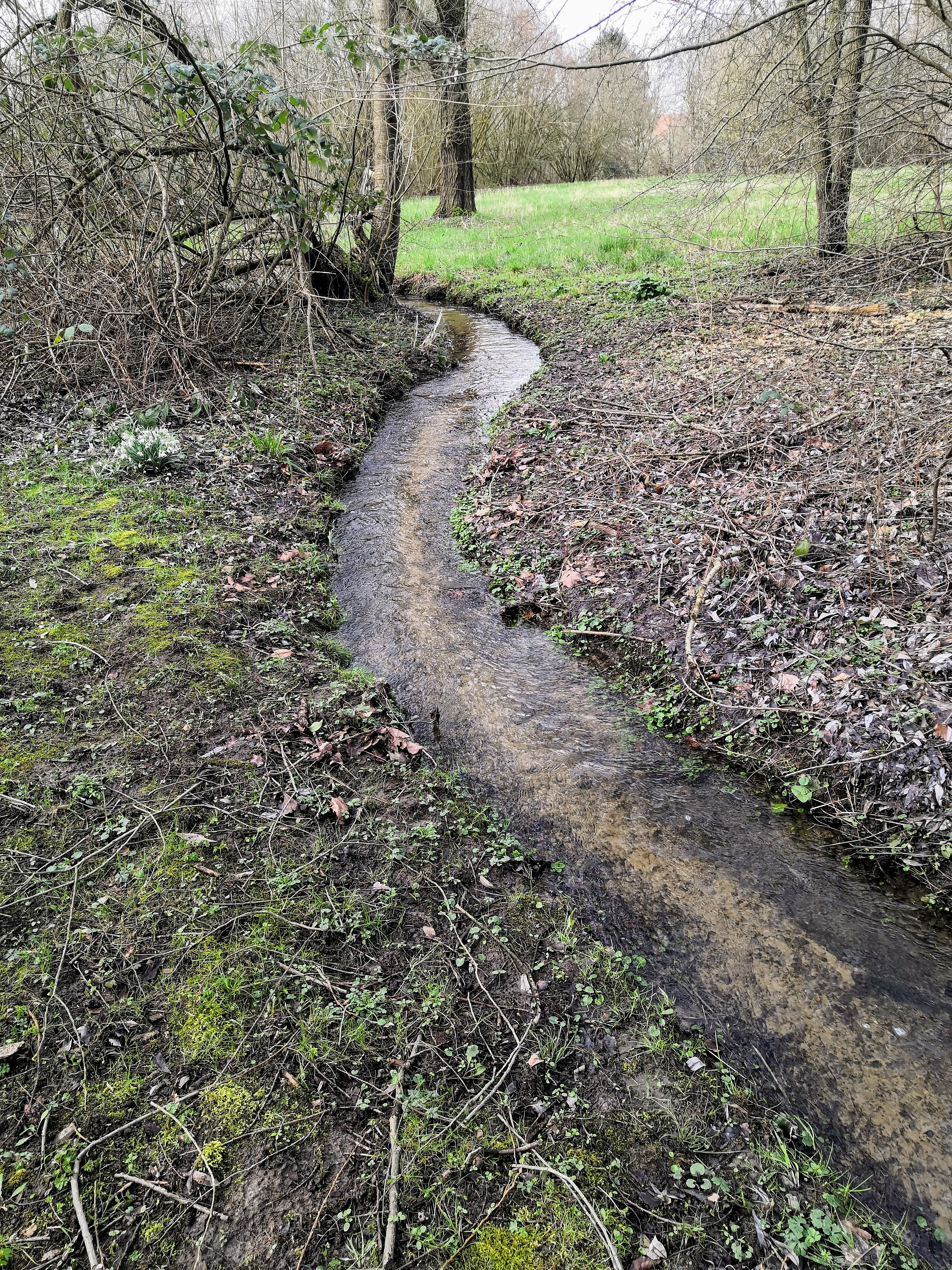

Location
- Country: Germany
- State: North Rhine-Westphalia

Physical characteristics
- Mouth
  - location: Werre
  - coordinates: 52.0986°N 8.6914°E

Basin features
- Progression: Werre→ Weser→ North Sea

Steinsieksbach is a small river of North Rhine-Westphalia, Germany. It is 3.4 km (2.1 mi) long and flows into the Werre as a right tributary near Herford.

== See also ==
- List of rivers of North Rhine-Westphalia.
