= Ostscheider Bach =

River in Germany

Location
- Country: Germany
- States: North Rhine-Westphalia

Physical characteristics
- Mouth
  - location: Werre
  - coordinates: 52.2072°N 8.7539°E

Basin features
- Progression: Werre→ Weser→ North Sea

Ostscheider Bach is a small river of North Rhine-Westphalia, Germany. It is 5.4 km (3.4 mi) long and flows into the Werre as a left tributary near Löhne.

== See also ==
- List of rivers of North Rhine-Westphalia
