= Schwelge =

River in Germany

Coordinates: 51°24′48″N 8°37′39″E

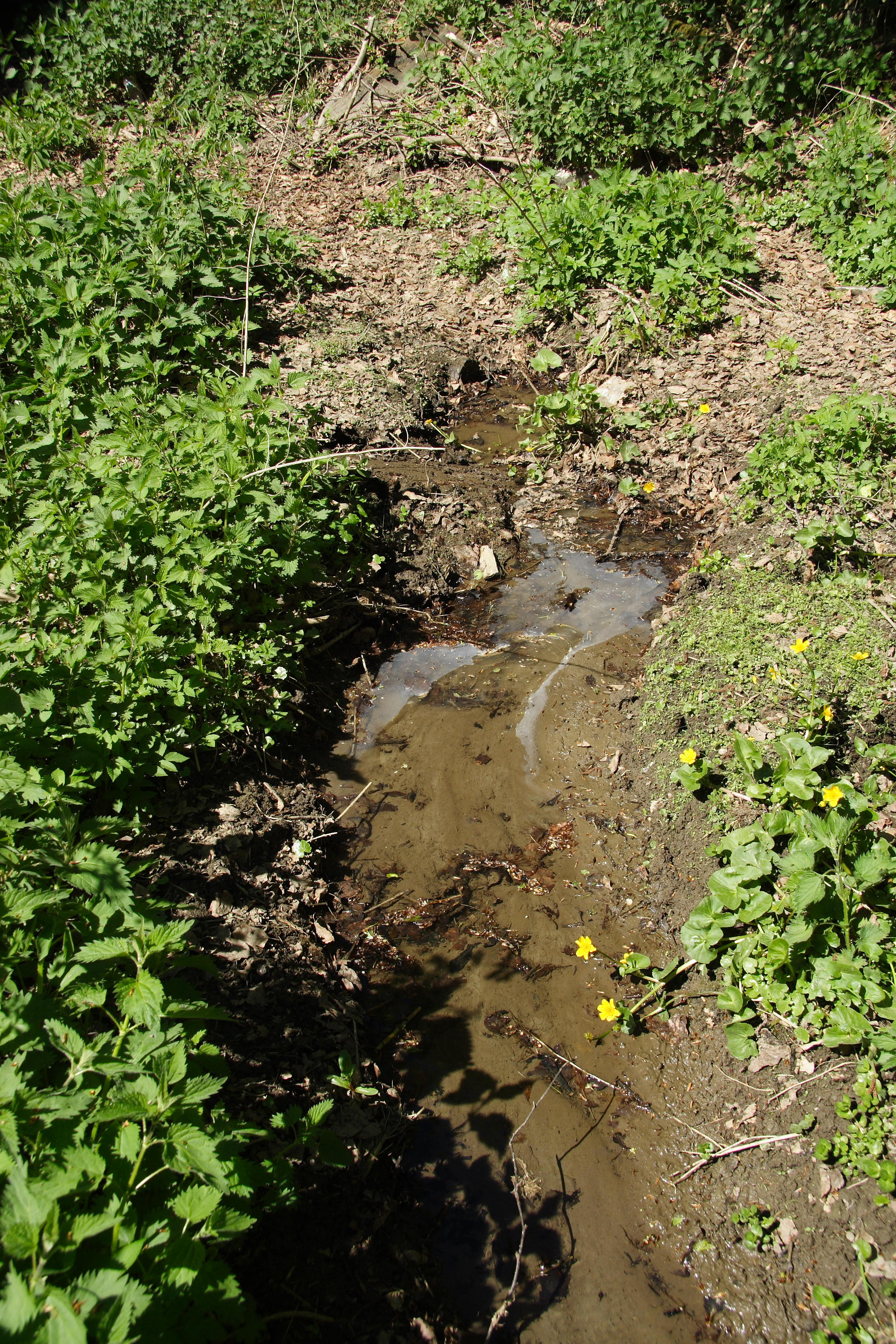

Location
- Country: Germany
- State: North Rhine-Westphalia

Schwelge is a river of North Rhine-Westphalia, Germany.

== See also ==
- List of rivers of North Rhine-Westphalia
