= Randelbach =

River in Germany

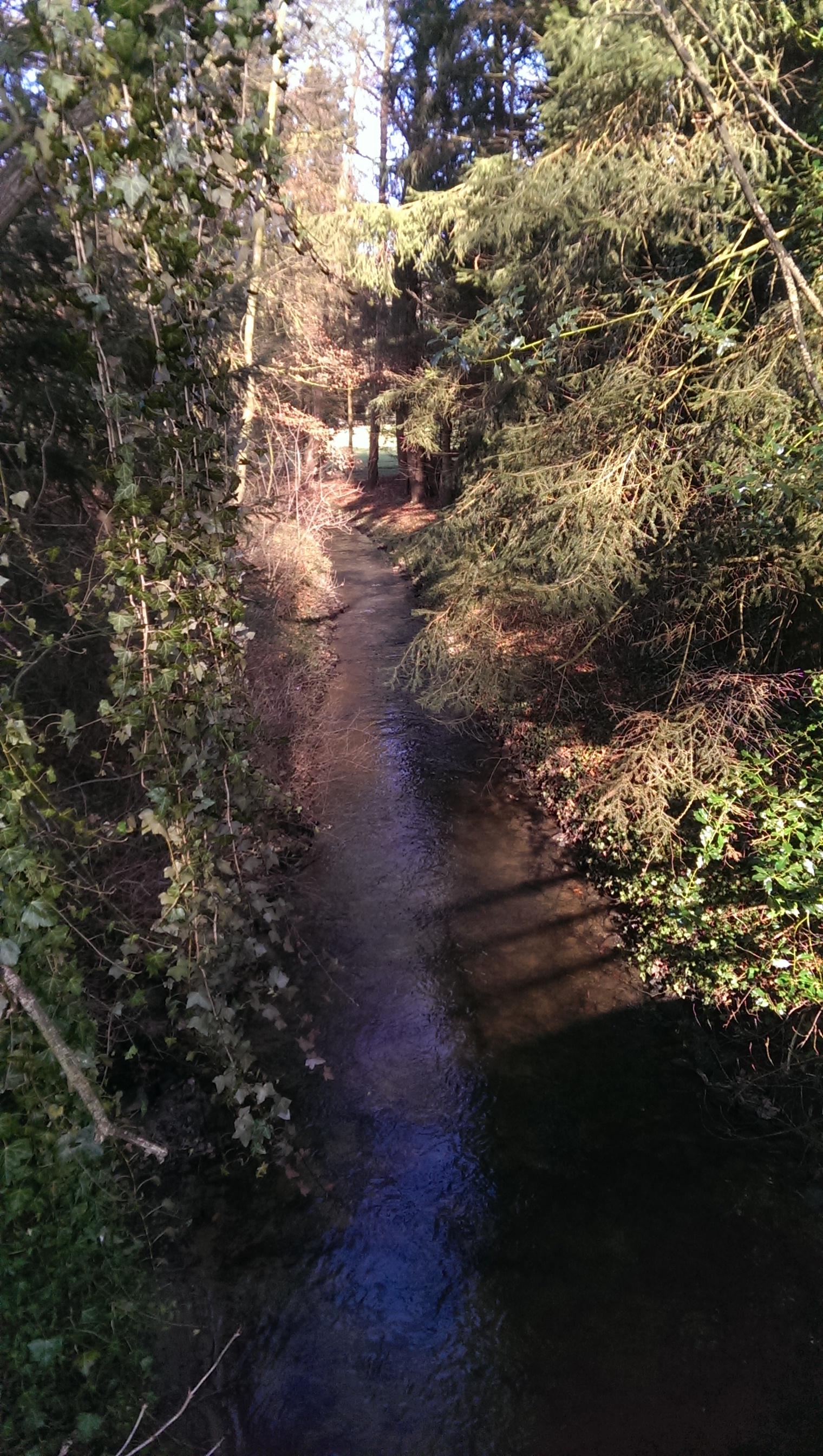

Location
- Country: Germany
- States: North Rhine-Westphalia

Physical characteristics
- Mouth
  - location: Ems
  - coordinates: 52.3078°N 7.4086°E

Basin features
- Progression: Ems→ North Sea

Randelbach is a small river of North Rhine-Westphalia, Germany. It is 5.9 km (3.7 mi) long and flows as a left tributary into the Ems near Rheine.

== See also ==
- List of rivers of North Rhine-Westphalia
