= Mutzbach =

River in Germany

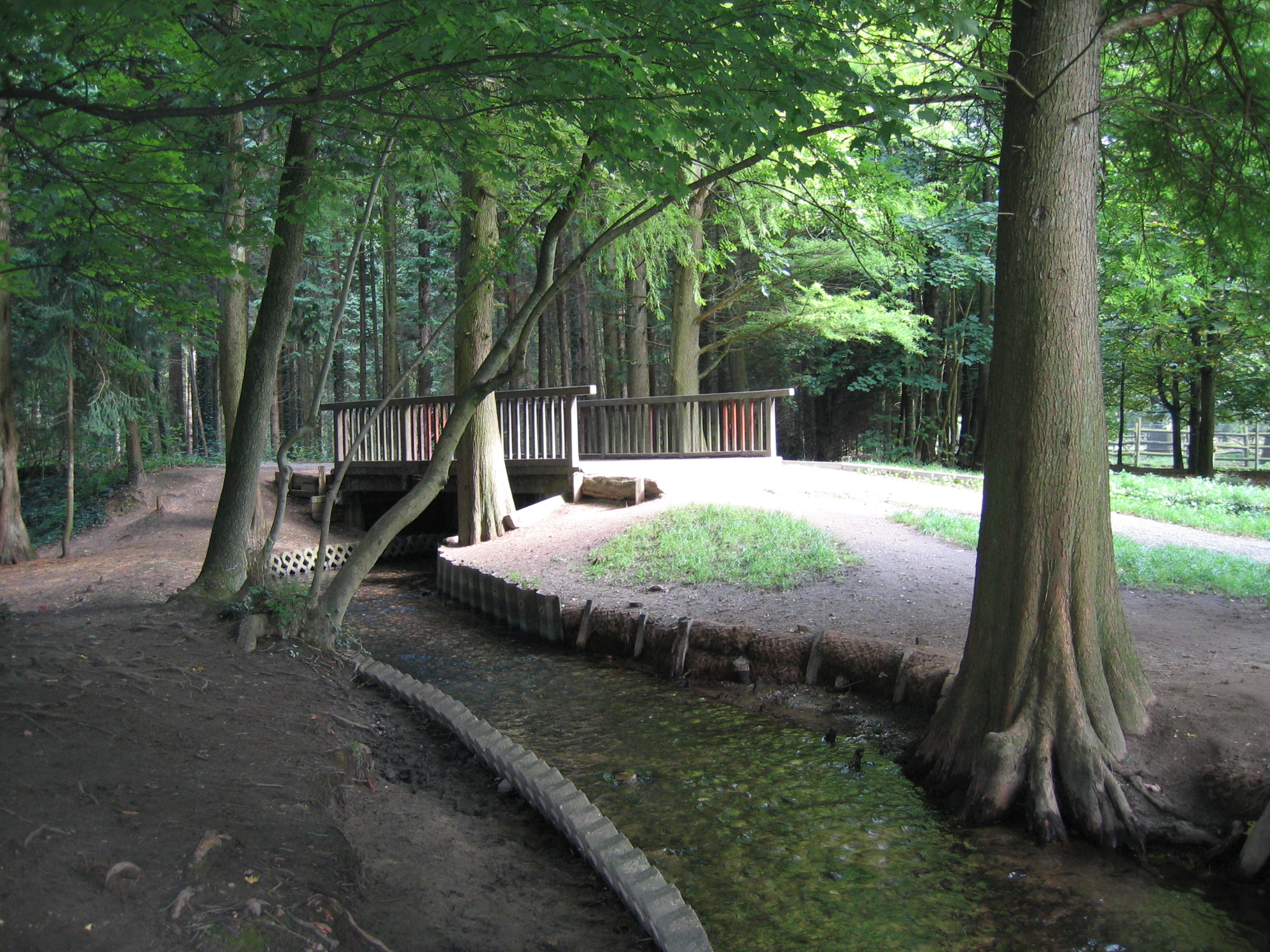

Location
- Country: Germany
- State: North Rhine-Westphalia

Physical characteristics
- Mouth
  - location: Dhünn
  - coordinates: 51.0353°N 6.9972°E
- Length: 15.1 km (9.4 mi)

Basin features
- Progression: Dhünn→ Wupper→ Rhine→ North Sea

Mutzbach is a river of North Rhine-Westphalia, Germany. It flows into the Dhünn in Leverkusen.

== See also ==
- List of rivers of North Rhine-Westphalia
