= Olligsbach =

River in Germany

Coordinates: 50.6863°N 7.0666°E

Location
- Country: Germany
- States: North Rhine-Westphalia

Olligsbach is a river of North Rhine-Westphalia, Germany.

== See also ==
- List of rivers of North Rhine-Westphalia
