= Pulheimer Bach =

River in Germany

Coordinates: 50.9959°N 6.8263°E

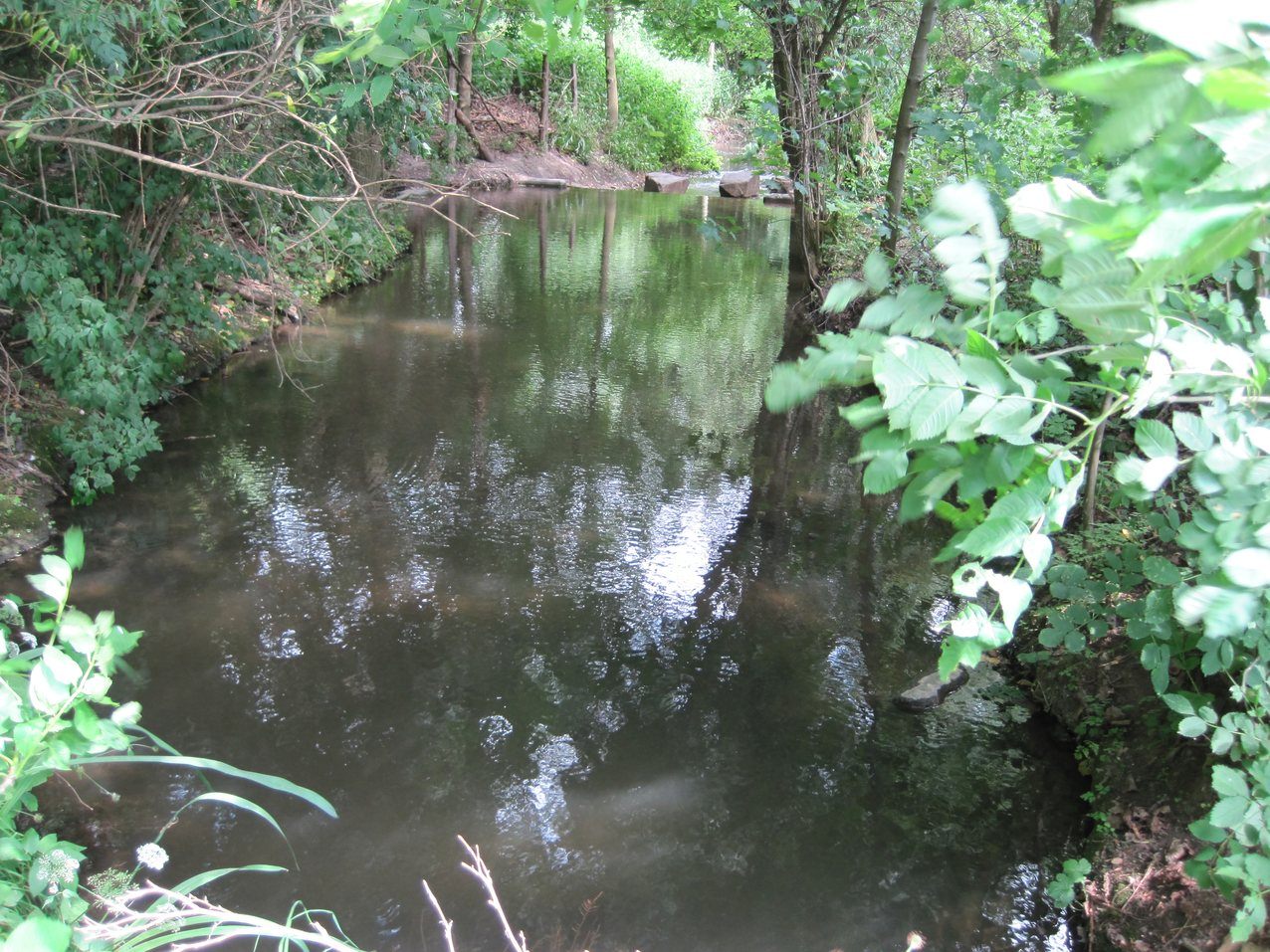

Location
- Country: Germany
- States: North Rhine-Westphalia

Pulheimer Bach is a stream in North Rhine-Westphalia, Germany. It is 8.5 km (5.3 mi) long.

After its final section near town of Pulheim, named the Große Laache, it seeps as groundwater over the course of several years to water treatment works, in a system that has been specially redesigned to better deal with the floodplain environment. As such, the watercourse has no confluence with another river or stream. The Große Laache is also designated as a nature reserve.

== See also ==
- List of rivers of North Rhine-Westphalia
