= Frischhofsbach =

River in Germany

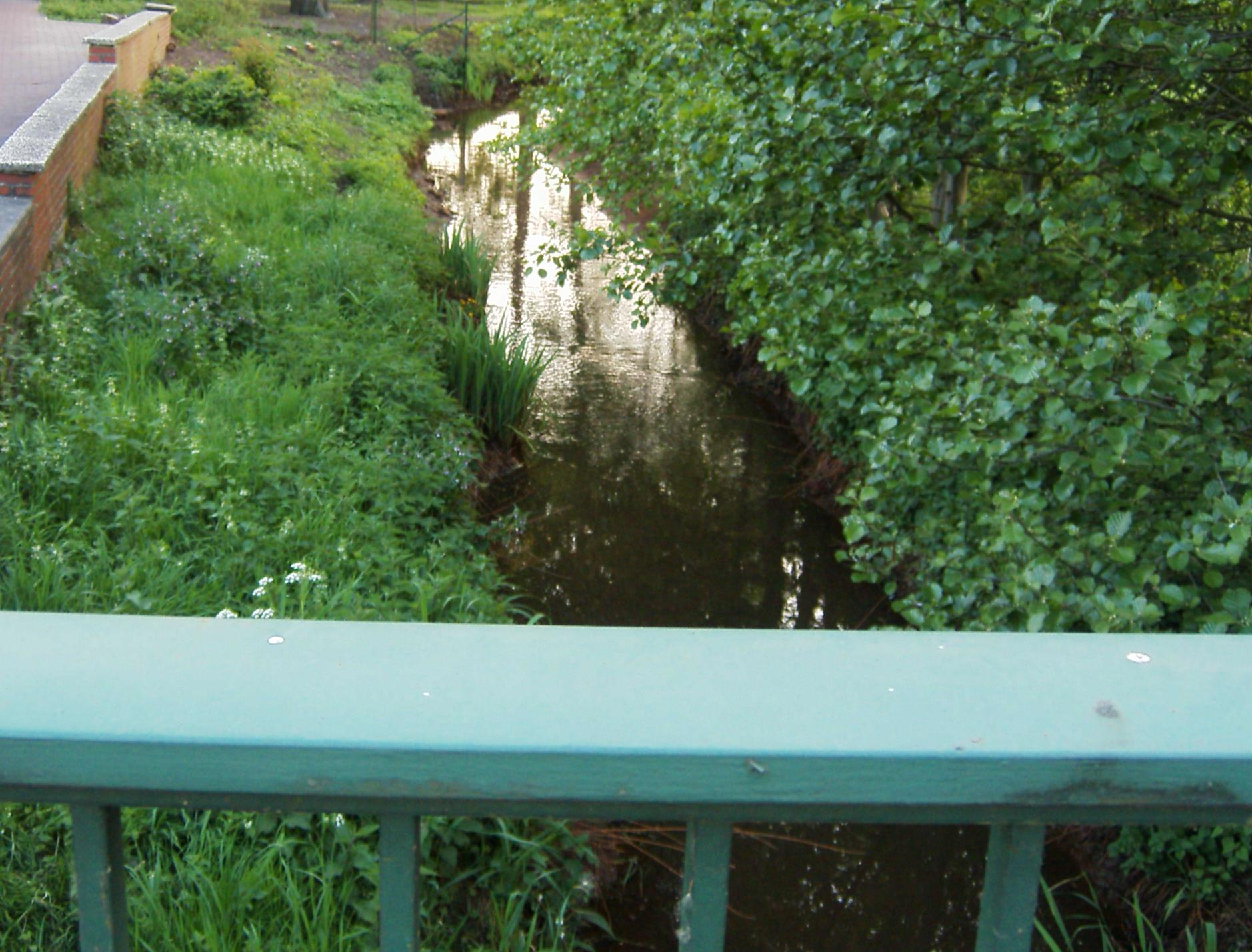

Location
- Country: Germany
- State: North Rhine-Westphalia

Physical characteristics
- Mouth
  - location: Ems
  - coordinates: 52°14′59″N 7°28′21″E
- Length: 18.6 km (11.6 mi)

Basin features
- Progression: Ems→ North Sea

Frischhofsbach is a river of North Rhine-Westphalia, Germany. It flows into the Ems near Rheine.

== See also ==
- List of rivers of North Rhine-Westphalia
