= Leimbach (Wupper) =

River in North Rhine-Westphalia, Germany

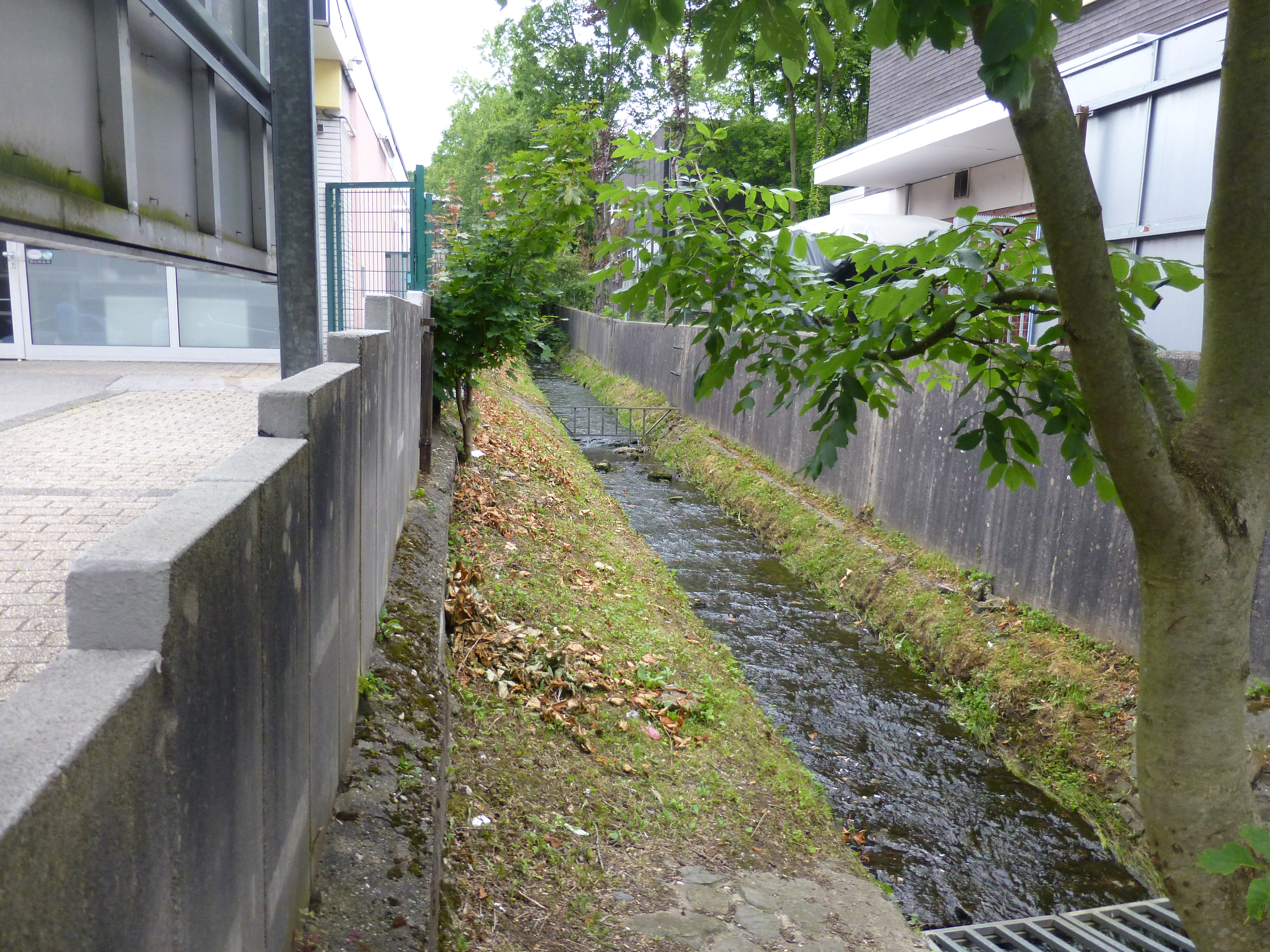

Location
- Country: Germany
- State: North Rhine-Westphalia

Physical characteristics
- Mouth: Wupper
  - coordinates: 51.2711°N 7.1957°E

Basin features
- Progression: Wupper→ Rhine→ North Sea
- Tributaries
  - left: Bachlauf an der Zietenstraße

The Leimbach or Lehmbeck is a river of North Rhine-Westphalia, Germany. It is a right tributary of the Wupper in Wuppertal.

== See also ==
- List of rivers of North Rhine-Westphalia
