= Mahlbergbach =

River in Germany

Coordinates: 50.7001°N 7.0724°E

Location
- Country: Germany
- States: North Rhine-Westphalia

Basin features
- Progression: Endenicher Bach→ Hardtbach→ Rhine→ North Sea

Mahlbergbach is a 380-metre-long brook in Bonn, Germany.

== See also ==
- List of rivers of North Rhine-Westphalia
