= Krabach =

River in Germany

Location
- Country: Germany
- State: North Rhine-Westphalia

Physical characteristics
- Mouth
  - location: Sieg
  - coordinates: 50.7619°N 7.3995°E
- Length: 10.2 km (6.3 mi)

Basin features
- Progression: Sieg→ Rhine→ North Sea

Krabach is a river of North Rhine-Westphalia, Germany. It flows into the Sieg near Eitorf.

== See also ==
- List of rivers of North Rhine-Westphalia
