= Werthenbach (Sieg) =

River in Germany

Location
- Country: Germany
- State: North Rhine-Westphalia

Physical characteristics
- Mouth
  - location: Sieg
  - coordinates: 50.8819°N 8.1430°E

Basin features
- Progression: Sieg→ Rhine→ North Sea

Werthenbach (or Werthen Bach) is a river of North Rhine-Westphalia, Germany. It is 9.7 km (6.0 mi) long and is a left tributary of the Sieg near Netphen.

== See also ==
- List of rivers of North Rhine-Westphalia
