= Thelenbach =

River in Germany

Coordinates: 50.7403°N 7.1370°E

Location
- Country: Germany
- State: North Rhine-Westphalia

Thelenbach is a river of North Rhine-Westphalia, Germany.

== See also ==
- List of rivers of North Rhine-Westphalia
