= List of rivers of North Rhine-Westphalia =

A list of rivers of North Rhine-Westphalia, Germany:

== A ==
- Aa, left tributary of the Möhne
- Aa, left tributary of the Nethe
- Aa, left tributary of the Werre
- Aabach, tributary of the Afte
- Aabach, small river in the Ems river system
- Abbabach
- Abrocksbach
- Afte
- Agger
- Ahler Bruchgraben
- Ahr
- Ahre
- Ahse
- Alaunbach
- Albaumer Bach
- Alche
- Alme
- Alte Emscher
- Alte Hessel
- Alte Issel
- Altenau
- Angel
- Angerbach
- Ankerbach
- Arbach
- Armuthsbach
- Arpe, left tributary of the Wenne joining it at Berge (a district of Meschede)
- Arpe, left tributary of the Wenne joining it at Niederberndorf (a district of Schmallenberg)
- Arzdorfer Bach, alternative name for Godesberger Bach
- Asbeke
- Asdorf
- Aue
- Auelsbach
- Auer Bach
- Aupke
- Axtbach

== B ==
- Baagebach
- Baarbach
- Babenhausener Bach
- Bachseifen
- Bachumer Bach
- Banfe
- Bärenbach
- Bastau
- Beberbach
- Beckendorfer Mühlenbach
- Bega
- Beilbach
- Beke
- Bekelbach
- Belgenbach
- Bendahler Bach
- Benfe
- Bennier Graben
- Bentgraben
- Berghauser Bach
- Berkel
- Berkelbach
- Berlebecke
- Bermecke, drained by the Heve
- Bermecke, tributary of the Möhne
- Bever, tributary of the Ems
- Bever, tributary of the Weser
- Bever, tributary of the Wupper
- Beverbach
- Bexter
- Biber
- Bieberbach
- Bieke, tributary of the Bigge
- Bieke, tributary of the Elpe
- Bieke, right tributary of the Glenne
- Bieke, tributary of the Kleine Henne
- Bigge
- Bilsteinbach
- Blombach
- Bocholter Aa
- Bockhorner Bach
- Borbach, tributary of the Ennepe
- Borbach, tributary of the Ruhr
- Bormelsbach
- Börnepader
- Bornscheider Bach
- Börstelbach
- Borstenbach
- Bowerre
- Brabecke
- Brachtpe
- Bramschebach
- Brandbach
- Brandenbaumer Bach
- Brebach
- Bremecke, tributary of the Hoppecke
- Bremecke, tributary of the Möhne
- Briller Bach
- Bröl
- Bruchbach
- Bruchhauser Bach
- Brucht
- Brunsbach, tributary of the Sülz
- Brunsbach, tributary of the Wupper
- Buchenhofener Siepen
- Buchheller
- Bückeburger Aue
- Bürgerbuschbach
- Burgholzbach
- Butterbach

== C ==
- Calenberger Bach
- Casumer Bach
- Compbach

== D ==
- Dalke
- Dammpader
- Darmühlenbach
- Deilbach
- Derenbach
- Dettmers Bach
- Dhünn
- Dichbach
- Dickopsbach
- Dielenpader
- Diemel
- Diestelbach
- Dinkel
- Dondert
- Dornmühlenbach
- Dörpe
- Dörspe
- Dortenbach
- Dreierwalder Aa
- Dreisbach, tributary of the Bröl
- Dreisbach, tributary of the Sieg
- Duffesbach
- Durbeke
- Düsedieksbach
- Düssel

== E ==
- Edelrather Bach
- Eder, tributary of the Fulda
- Eder, tributary of the Eggel
- Eggel
- Ehrenberger Bach
- Eickumer Mühlenbach
- Eifgenbach
- Eipbach
- Eisernbach
- Eistringhauser Bach
- Ellebach
- Ellerbach
- Ellerbrockgraben
- Ellersieker Bach
- Elpe
- Elpenbach
- Else, tributary of the Lenne
- Else, tributary of the Werre
- Elsebach
- Elsoff
- Elspebach
- Elsternbuschbach
- Emmer
- Emmerbach
- Ems
- Emscher
- Emsdettener Mühlenbach
- Endenicher Bach
- Ennepe
- Erft
- Erlenbach
- Erpa
- Eschbach
- Eschenbeek
- Eschensiepen
- Eselsbach, left tributary of the Else
- Eselsbach, right tributary of the Warmenau
- Esselbach
- Eusternbach
- Exter

== F ==
- Falbecke, alternative name for Glingebach
- Felderbach
- Ferndorfbach
- Finkelbach
- Finkenbach
- Fischbach
- Fischertaler Bach
- Flehbach
- Florabach
- Forellenbach
- Forthbach
- Freebach
- Fretterbach
- Frischebach
- Frischhofsbach
- Frohnhauser Bach
- Frohnholzbach
- Fülsenbecke
- Furlbach

== G ==
- Galkhausener Bach
- Gaulbach
- Gebke, right tributary of the Ruhr in Meschede
- Gebke, right tributary of the Ruhr in Wennemen, district of Meschede
- Gehle
- Geinegge
- Gelderner Fleuth
- Gelpe
- Genkel
- Geseker Bach
- Gewinghauser Bach
- Gierskoppbach
- Gierzhagener Bach
- Gievenbach
- Gillbach
- Gilsbach
- Gladbach
- Glane
- Glanerbeek
- Glasbach
- Gleierbach, tributary of the Lenne in Schmallenberg
- Gleierbach, tributary of the Lenne in Gleierbrück
- Glenne, tributary of the Lippe
- Glenne, tributary of the Möhne
- Glimke
- Glingebach
- Godesberger Bach
- Goldbach
- Gosenbach
- Göttchesbach
- Grafschaft
- Grenzbach
- Grift
- Grippenbach
- Große Aa
- Große Aue
- Große Dumecke
- Große Schmalenau
- Großer Bastergraben
- Großer Dieckriver
- Grube
- Grubebach
- Grüner Bach
- Gruttbach
- Günse
- Gürzenicher Bach
- Gutenbach

== H ==
- Habighorster Bach
- Haferbach
- Hagenbach
- Hagerbeck
- Hahnenbach
- Hahnerberger Siepen
- Halle
- Hallerbach
- Halstenbach
- Halstenbecker Bach
- Halterner Mühlenbach
- Halverder Aa
- Halverder-Schaler Aa
- Hammer Bach
- Hanfbach
- Hardenberger Bach
- Hardtbach, tributary of the Rhine
- Hardtbach, tributary of the Wupper
- Harlebach
- Hartmecke
- Haßbach
- Hasselbach, tributary of the Dalke
- Hasselbach, tributary of the Werre
- Hatzenbeck
- Hauptkanal Sterkrade
- Hebbecke
- Heder
- Heesbach
- Heidenbach
- Heilsbach
- Heipker Bach
- Hellbach
- Helle
- Heller
- Hemelter Bach
- Hengelsbach
- Hengstener Bach
- Henne
- Herbringhauser Bach
- Hessel
- Hettmecke
- Heubach, upstream of the Halterner Mühlenbach
- Heubach, tributary of the Emmer
- Heusiepen
- Heve
- Hilgenbach
- Hillbringse
- Hillebach
- Hirschberger Bach
- Höbecke
- Hofsiefen
- Hohenhager Bach
- Hohnderfeldbach
- Hohner Bach
- Holperbach
- Holtebach
- Holzbach, tributary of the Ahse
- Holzbach, tributary of the Auelsbach
- Holzbach, tributary of the Belgenbach
- Holzbach, tributary of the Dickopsbach
- Holzbach, tributary of the Ems
- Holzbach, tributary of the Emscher
- Holzbach, tributary of the Erft
- Holzbach, tributary of the Finkenbach
- Holzer Bach
- Honebach
- Hönne
- Hönnige
- Hoppecke
- Horbacher Bach
- Hormecke
- Hörster Bach
- Hörsterholzer Bach
- Hovebach
- Hover Bach
- Hubertusbach
- Humme
- Hundem
- Hunnebecke

== I ==
- Ickbach
- Ihne
- Ilpe
- Ilse, tributary of the Bega
- Ilse, tributary of the Lahn
- Inde
- Irserbach
- Issumer Fleuth
- Itter, tributary of the Diemel
- Itter, tributary of the Rhine

== J ==
- Jabach
- Johannisbach
- Jöllenbecker Mühlenbach

== K ==
- Kall
- Kalle
- Kaltenbach
- Kanal III C
- Kanal III3b
- Kannenbach
- Katzenbach
- Kelbke
- Kendel
- Kerspe
- Kervenheimer Mühlenfleuth
- Kielhackensiepen
- Kilverbach
- Kinderbach, tributary of the Kannenbach southwest of Münster
- Kinderbach, tributary of the Münstersche Aa north of Münster
- Kittelbach
- Kleine Aa
- Kleine Düssel
- Kleine Emscher
- Kleine Gebke
- Kleine Henne
- Kleine Schmalenau
- Kleinebach
- Kleiner Wildenbach
- Kleppe
- Klosterbach, tributary of the Große Aue
- Klosterbach, tributary of the Schwarzbach
- Kloßsiepen
- Klusensprung
- Knisterbach
- Knochenbach
- Knollerbach
- Knöselbach
- Köhm
- Kollenbach
- Kothener Bach
- Köttelbach
- Krabach
- Krampsbach
- Krebsbach
- Kretzer Bach
- Kreuzbach
- Krollbach
- Krudtscheider Bach
- Krullsbach
- Kühlbach
- Künsebecker Bach
- Kürtener Sülz
- Küttelbieke
- Kyll

== L ==
- Ladbergener Mühlbach
- Lahn
- Laibach
- Lambach, tributary of the Loper Bach
- Lambach, tributary of the Eickumer Mühlenbach
- Landerbach
- Langer Bach
- Lannertbach
- Latrop
- Leimbach, tributary of the Dhünn
- Leimbach, tributary of the Wupper
- Leiße
- Lenne
- Leppe
- Leyerbach
- Lichtebach
- Liese, tributary of the Glenne
- Liese, tributary of the Nuhne
- Liesendählke
- Lindlarer Sülz
- Linkläuer Bach
- Linnenbeeke
- Linnepe
- Linnicher Mühlenteich
- Lippe
- Lippinghauser Bach
- Lister
- Littfe
- Lobach
- Lochbach
- Loddenbach
- Loemühlenbach
- Logebach
- Lohbach
- Lohmühlenbach
- Löhner Schulbach
- Lollenbach
- Lombach
- Loopebach
- Loper Bach
- Lörmecke
- Lottenbach
- Lötzelbach
- Lüntenbeck
- Lütte Bermecke
- Lutter, headwater stream of the Aa
- Lutter, tributary of the Ems

== M ==
- Mahlbergbach
- Maibach
- Malefinkbach
- Markbach
- Marpe
- Marscheider Bach
- Maspernpader
- Mausbach
- Meckelbach
- Medebach
- Mehner Bach
- Melbbach
- Menkebach
- Mersbach
- Merzbach
- Mettmecke
- Mirker Bach
- Mitbach
- Mittelbach
- Mittelbuschbach
- Möhne
- Moorbach, tributary of the Bever
- Moorbach, tributary of the Werfener Bach
- Morsbach
- Mühlbach
- Mühlenbach, tributary of the Eggel
- Mühlenbach, tributary of the Ruhr
- Mühlenbach, tributary of the Werre
- Mühlenbach, tributary of the Schwarzbach
- Mülmecke
- Münstersche Aa
- Murbach
- Murmelbach
- Mutzbach

== N ==
- Naafbach
- Nahmerbach
- Namenlose
- Napte
- Nebenkämper Siefen
- Neerdar
- Neffelbach
- Neger, tributary of the Bieke
- Neger, tributary of the Ruhr
- Neismecke
- Nesselbach
- Nethe
- Netphe
- Nette, tributary of the Alme
- Nette, tributary of the Lenne
- Nette, tributary of the Niers
- Neye
- Nienberger Bach
- Nierbach
- Niers
- Niese
- Nöllenberger Bach
- Nonnenbach
- Nordbach
- Norfbach
- Norrenberger Bach
- Noßbach
- Nuhne

== O ==
- Obernau
- Oberscheider Bach
- Oberwiesengraben
- Odeborn
- Oefter Bach
- Oesber Bach
- Oese
- Oetternbach
- Ölbach, tributary of the Berkel
- Ölbach, tributary of the Wapelbach
- Olef
- Olfe, tributary of the Nuhne
- Olfe, tributary of the Werse
- Olligsbach
- Olpe, tributary of the Bigge
- Olpe, tributary of the Hundem
- Omerbach
- Ophover Mühlenbach
- Orke
- Orpe
- Öse
- Ösper
- Ossenbeck
- Ostbach, tributary of the Else
- Ostbach, tributary of the Emscher
- Ostscheider Bach
- Otterbach, tributary of the Inde
- Otterbach, tributary of the Weser
- Ottersbach

== P ==
- Pader
- Passade
- Pastoratshofer Bach
- Pau
- Paunell
- Perlenbach
- Peschsiefen
- Pixwaager Bach
- Platißbach
- Pleisbach
- Poggenbach
- Pöppelsche
- Pottsiepen
- Pulheimer Bach
- Pustmühlenbach

== Q ==
- Quamecke
- Quirrenbach

== R ==
- Rahmede
- Randelbach
- Rarbach
- Rehmerloh-Mennighüffer Mühlenbach
- Reiherbach
- Reingser Bach
- Remelsbach
- Remlingrader Bach
- Renau
- Rengse
- Repe
- Rethlager Bach
- Rhedaer Bach
- Rhine
- Rheindorfer Bach
- Riedenbach
- Rinderbach
- Rinnebach
- Rißneibach
- Rodenbach
- Roderbach
- Röhr
- Röhrbach
- Rolfbach
- Romecke, tributary of the Möhne
- Romecke, tributary of the Linnepe
- Ronceva
- Rose
- Rosenaue
- Rospebach
- Roßsiefenbach
- Rotbach, tributary of the Erft
- Rotbach, tributary of the Rhine
- Rothbroicher Bach
- Rothenbach, tributary of the Ems
- Rothenbach, tributary of the Werre
- Rothobornpader
- Rottscheider Bach
- Rumbach
- Rur
- Rutenbeck
- Ruthebach
- Ruthenbach

== S ==
- Saalbach
- Sagebach
- Salwey
- Salze
- Saubach
- Sauer
- Schaler Aa
- Scharrenberger Bach
- Scheebach
- Schelderbach
- Schellenbeck
- Scheuerbach
- Schierenbeke
- Schinderbach
- Schipbeek
- Schledde, tributary of the Ahse
- Schledde, tributary of the Störmeder Bach
- Schlinge
- Schlingenbach
- Schloßhofbach
- Schmala
- Schmalenbach
- Schmalenhofer Bach
- Schmelzbach
- Schmitteborner Bach
- Schmittwasser
- Schnakenbach
- Schönebeck
- Schorenbach
- Schottmecke
- Schwalm
- Schwarzbach, tributary of the Johannisbach i.e. Westfälische Aa
- Schwarzbach, of the Bergisches Land, tributary of the Rhine
- Schwarzbach, tributary of the Emscher
- Schwarzbach, tributary of the Wupper
- Schwarzer Graben
- Schwarzes Siepen
- Schwarzwasserbach
- Schwelge
- Schwelme
- Sengbach
- Sennebach
- Senserbach
- Seßmarbach
- Settmecke
- Sichter
- Sickingmühlenbach
- Siebenbach
- Siechenbach
- Sieg
- Siegburger Mühlengraben
- Siekbach
- Silberbach
- Silvertbach
- Soestbach
- Sonneborn
- Sorpe, tributary of the Lenne
- Sorpe, tributary of the Röhr
- Speller Aa
- Spenger Mühlenbach
- Spreeler Bach
- Springebach
- Springer Bach
- Sprockhöveler Bach
- Sprungbach
- Stackenberger Bach
- Stakelberger Bach
- Steinagger
- Steinbach, tributary of the Laerbach
- Steinbach, tributary of the Vilicher Bach
- Steinbecke, tributary of the Möhne
- Steinbecke, tributary of the Valme
- Steinbeke
- Steinbruch Siefen
- Steinfurter Aa
- Steinhauser Bach, tributary of the Wupper
- Steinhauserbergbach
- Steinsiekbach
- Stever
- Stoffelsberger Bach
- Störmeder Bach
- Strangbach
- Strombach
- Strothbach
- Strothe
- Strülleken
- Strunde
- Sudbach
- Sudbrackbach
- Sülz
- Sunderbach, tributary of the Trüggelbach
- Sunderbach, tributary of that Else that is a tributary of the Werre
- Swist

== T ==
- Teufelsbach, in the district Beuel of Bonn
- Teufelsbach, a tributary of the Müggenbach which is itself a tributary of the Morsbach
- Teufelsbach, a tributary of the Rhynerscher Bach
- Thelenbach
- Thune
- Thunebach
- Toppmannsbach
- Treise
- Trüfte
- Trüggelbach
- Tüterbach
- Twiste

== U ==
- Uelfe
- Uentrop
- Uhlenbach
- Untreue
- Urft

== V ==
- Valme
- Varresbeck
- Vechte
- Veischede
- Verse
- Veybach
- Vichtbach
- Vilicher Bach
- Villiper Bach
- Violenbach
- Vlattener Bach
- Vogelsangbach
- Volkersbach
- Volme
- Vorthgraben
- Voßmecke

== W ==
- Wacker
- Wahnbach
- Walbach
- Waldbach, tributary of the Gürzenicher Bach
- Waldbach, tributary of the Röhr
- Waldbach, tributary of the similar named river Waldbach that is a tributary of the Röhr
- Waldbrölbach
- Waldsiepen
- Wanne, tributary of the Möhne
- Wanne, tributary of the Ruhr
- Wannebach, right tributary of the Lenne
- Wannebach, left tributary of the Ruhr
- Wannebach, right tributary of the Ruhr
- Wannenbach
- Wapelbach
- Warme Pader
- Warmenau
- Wehebach
- Wehmerhorster Bach
- Weibe
- Weierbach
- Weilandsiepen
- Weiß
- Welplagebach
- Weltersbach
- Wendbach
- Wenne
- Werfener Bach
- Werre
- Werschbach
- Werse
- Werthenbach
- Weser, flows into the North Sea
- Weser, tributary of the Ourthe in Belgium
- Westbach
- Wester
- Westerholter Bach
- Westernahbach
- Wideybach
- Wiebach
- Wiebelhäuser Bach
- Wiebelsaat
- Wiedey
- Wiehl
- Wiembach
- Wiembecke
- Wiesengraben
- Wiggenbach
- Wildbach
- Wilde Aa
- Wildenbach
- Wilhelmstaler Bach
- Willicher Fleuth
- Wimberbach
- Windwehe
- Wippe
- Wipperfelder Bach
- Wisser Bach
- Wolfsbach
- Wörbke
- Wupper
- Wurm

== Z ==
- Bachlauf an der Zietenstraße
