= Galkhausener Bach =

River in Germany

Coordinates: 51.1376°N 6.9064°E

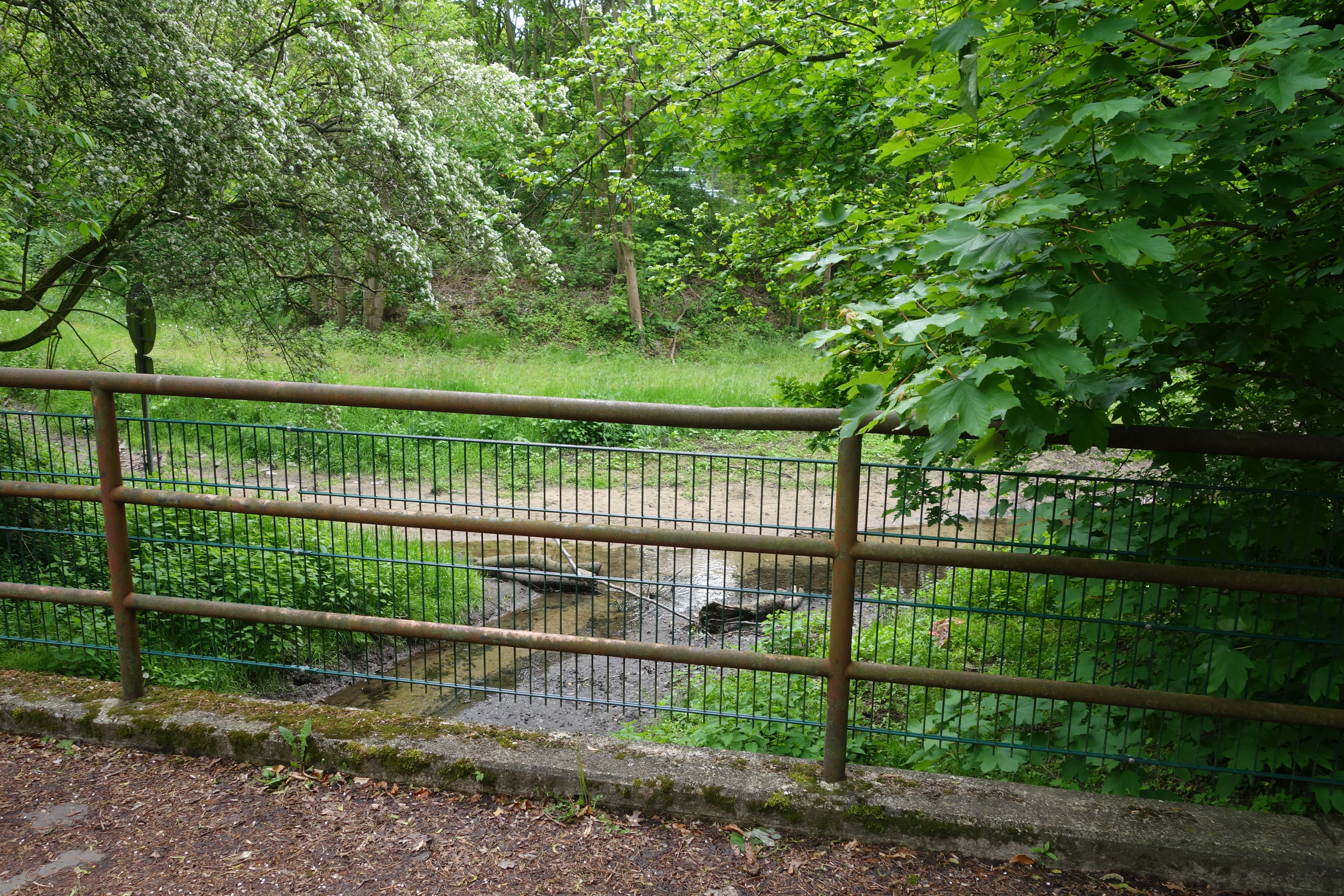

Location
- Country: Germany
- States: North Rhine-Westphalia

Galkhausener Bach is a river of North Rhine-Westphalia, Germany. It is 9.8 km long and a left tributary of the Garather Mühlenbach, which in turn flows into Rhine.

== See also ==
- List of rivers of North Rhine-Westphalia
