= Heidenbach =

River in Germany

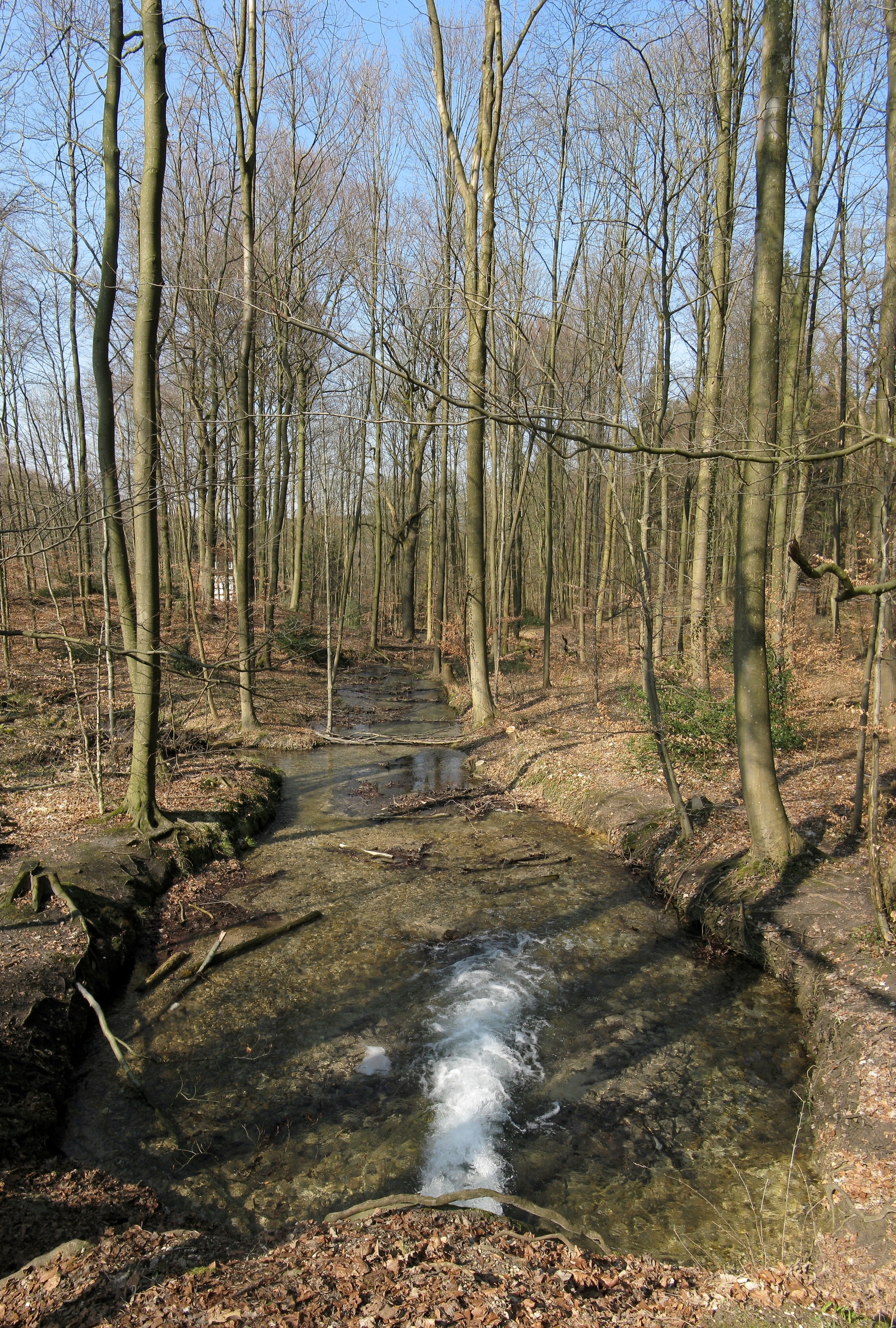

Location
- Country: Germany
- States: North Rhine-Westphalia

Physical characteristics
- Mouth
  - location: Werre
  - coordinates: 51°57′16″N 8°50′45″E

Basin features
- Progression: Werre→ Weser→ North Sea

Heidenbach is a small river of North Rhine-Westphalia, Germany. It is 6.6 km long and flows into the Werre near Detmold.

== See also ==
- List of rivers of North Rhine-Westphalia
