= Steinbach (Vilicher Bach) =

River in Bonn, Germany

Coordinates: 50.7482°N 7.1645°E

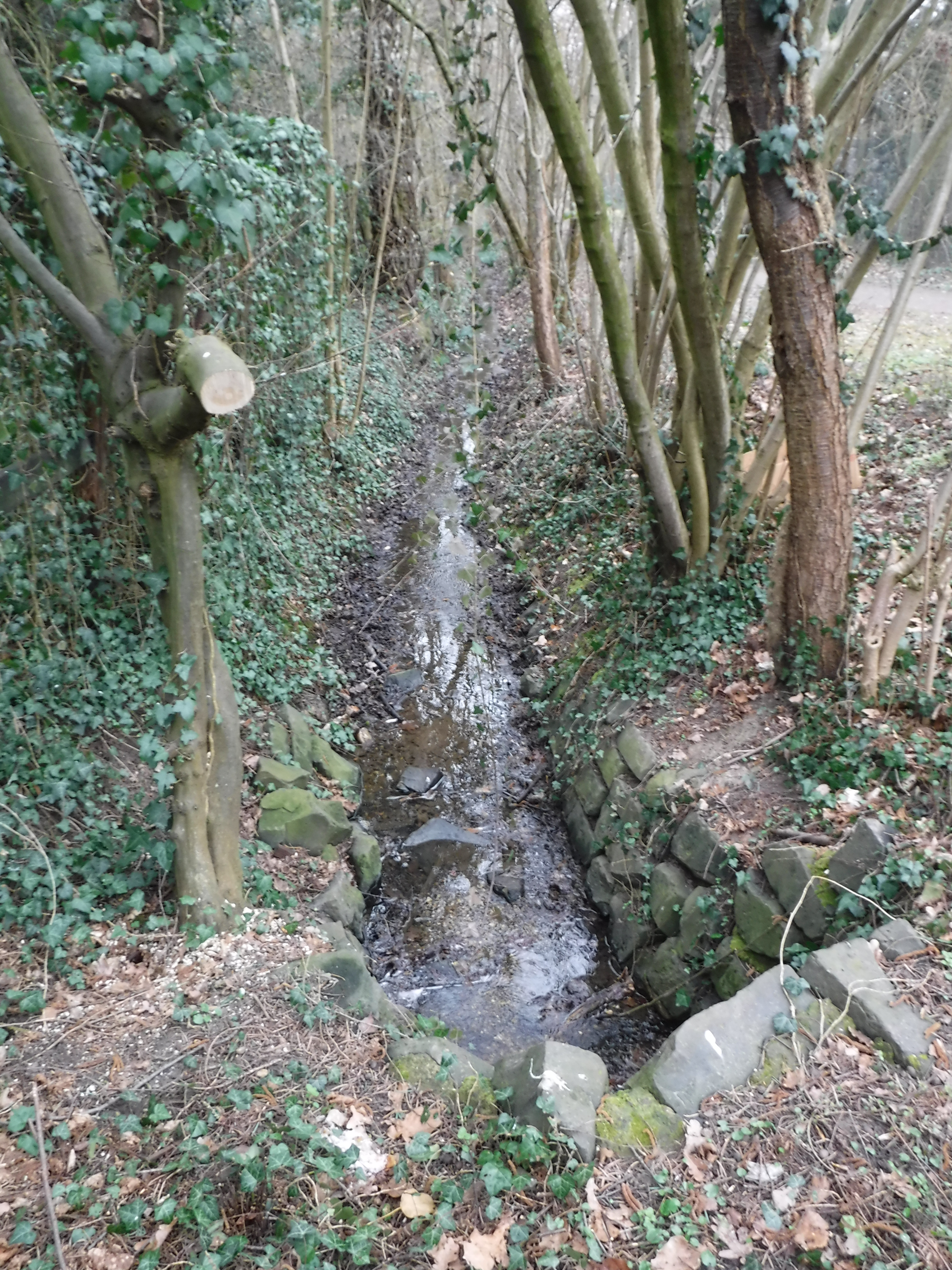

Location
- Country: Germany
- State: North Rhine-Westphalia

Steinbach is a river of North Rhine-Westphalia, Germany, in the district Beuel of Bonn. It is 2.2 km (1.4 mi) long and flows as a left tributary into the Mühlenbach, a section of the Vilicher Bach. It is one of 30 rivers and streams in North Rhine-Westphalia officially recorded under the name Steinbach.

== See also ==
- List of rivers of North Rhine-Westphalia
