= Meckelbach =

River in Germany

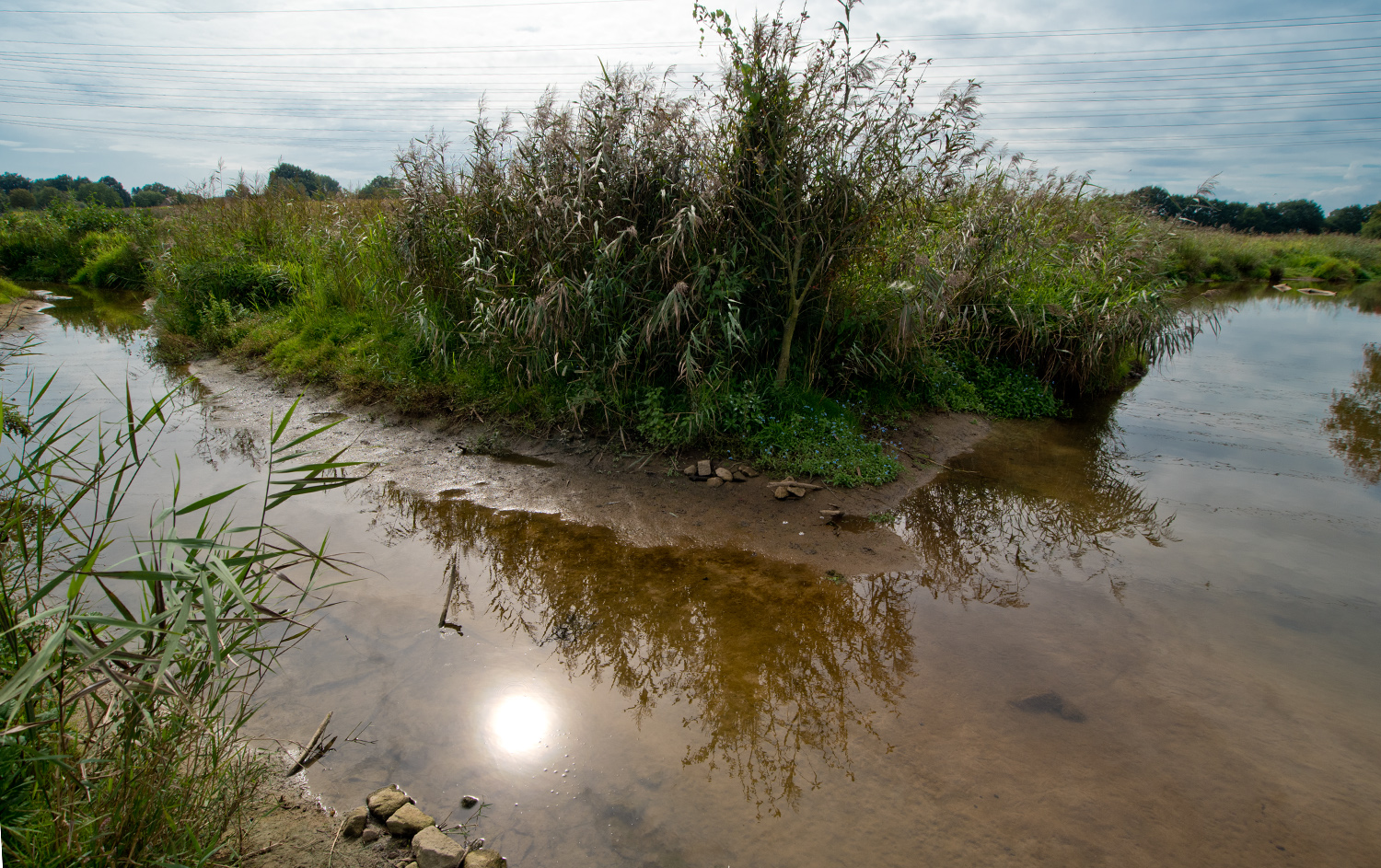

Location
- Country: Germany
- State: North Rhine-Westphalia

Physical characteristics
- Mouth
  - location: Münstersche Aa
  - coordinates: 51.9386°N 7.5828°E
- Length: 8.1 km (5.0 mi)

Basin features
- Progression: Münstersche Aa→ Ems→ North Sea

Meckelbach is a river of North Rhine-Westphalia, Germany. It flows into the Münstersche Aa southwest of Münster.

== See also ==
- List of rivers of North Rhine-Westphalia
