= Frohnholzbach =

River in Germany

Coordinates: 50.6636°N 7.1332°E

Location
- Country: Germany
- States: North Rhine-Westphalia

Frohnholzbach is a river of North Rhine-Westphalia, Germany.

== See also ==
- List of rivers of North Rhine-Westphalia
