= Hemelter Bach =

River in Germany

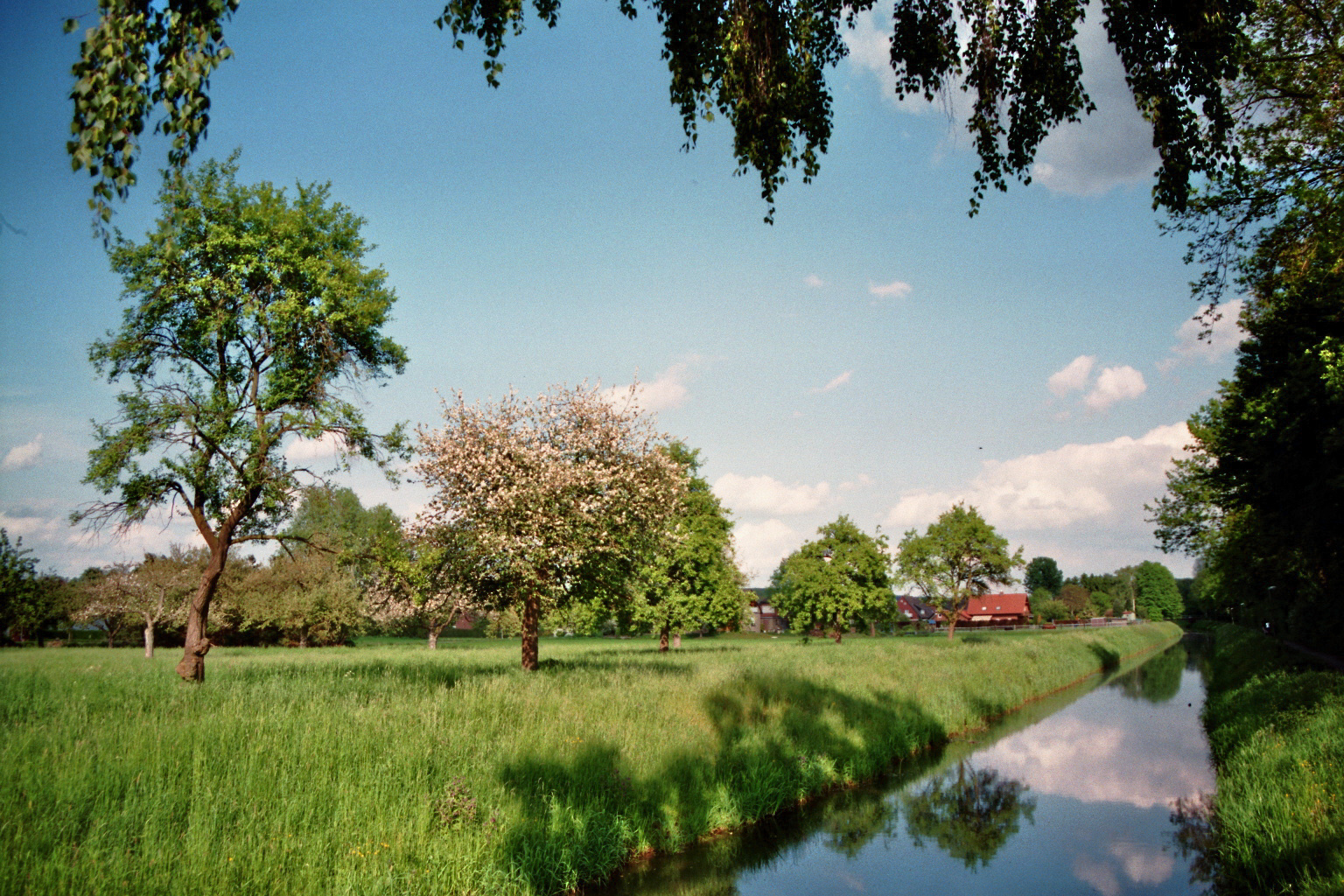

Location
- Country: Germany
- State: North Rhine-Westphalia

Physical characteristics
- Mouth
  - location: Ems
  - coordinates: 52.2719°N 7.4544°E
- Length: 33.9 km (21.1 mi)
- Basin size: 109 km^{2} (42 sq mi)

Basin features
- Progression: Ems→ North Sea

Hemelter Bach is a river of North Rhine-Westphalia, Germany. It flows into the Ems in Rheine.

== See also ==
- List of rivers of North Rhine-Westphalia
