= Horbacher Bach =

River in Germany

Location
- Country: Germany
- States: North Rhine-Westphalia

Physical characteristics
- Mouth
  - location: Bröl
  - coordinates: 50.8246°N 7.3616°E

Basin features
- Progression: Bröl→ Sieg→ Rhine→ North Sea

Horbacher Bach is a small river of North Rhine-Westphalia, Germany. It is 4.8 km long and a right tributary of the Bröl.

== See also ==
- List of rivers of North Rhine-Westphalia
