= Tüterbach =

River in Germany

Coordinates: 51.9686°N 8.4647°E

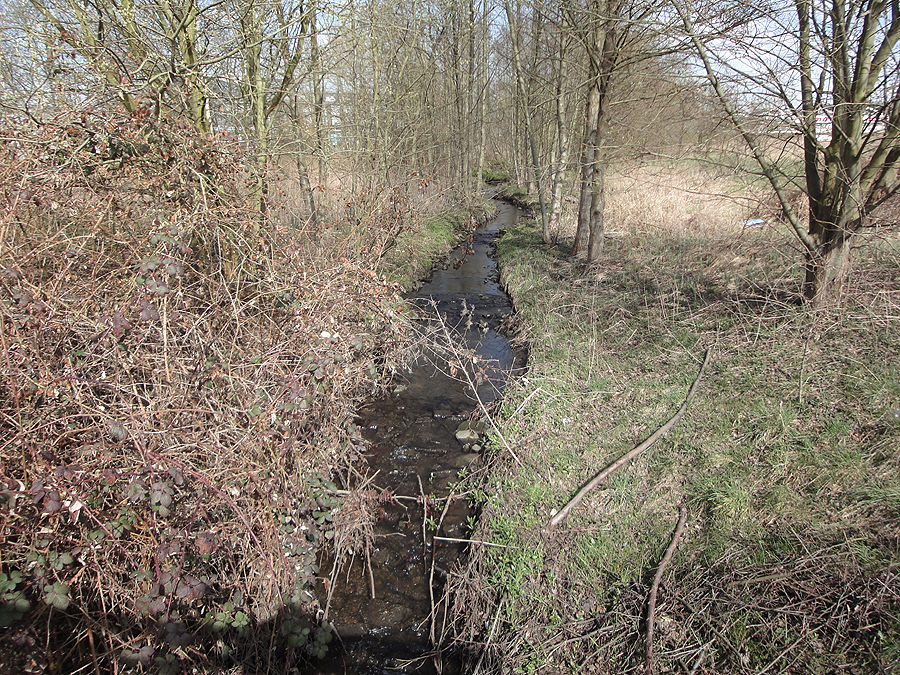

Location
- Country: Germany
- State: North Rhine-Westphalia

Tüterbach is a river of North Rhine-Westphalia, Germany.

== See also ==
- List of rivers of North Rhine-Westphalia
