= Issumer Fleuth =

River in Germany

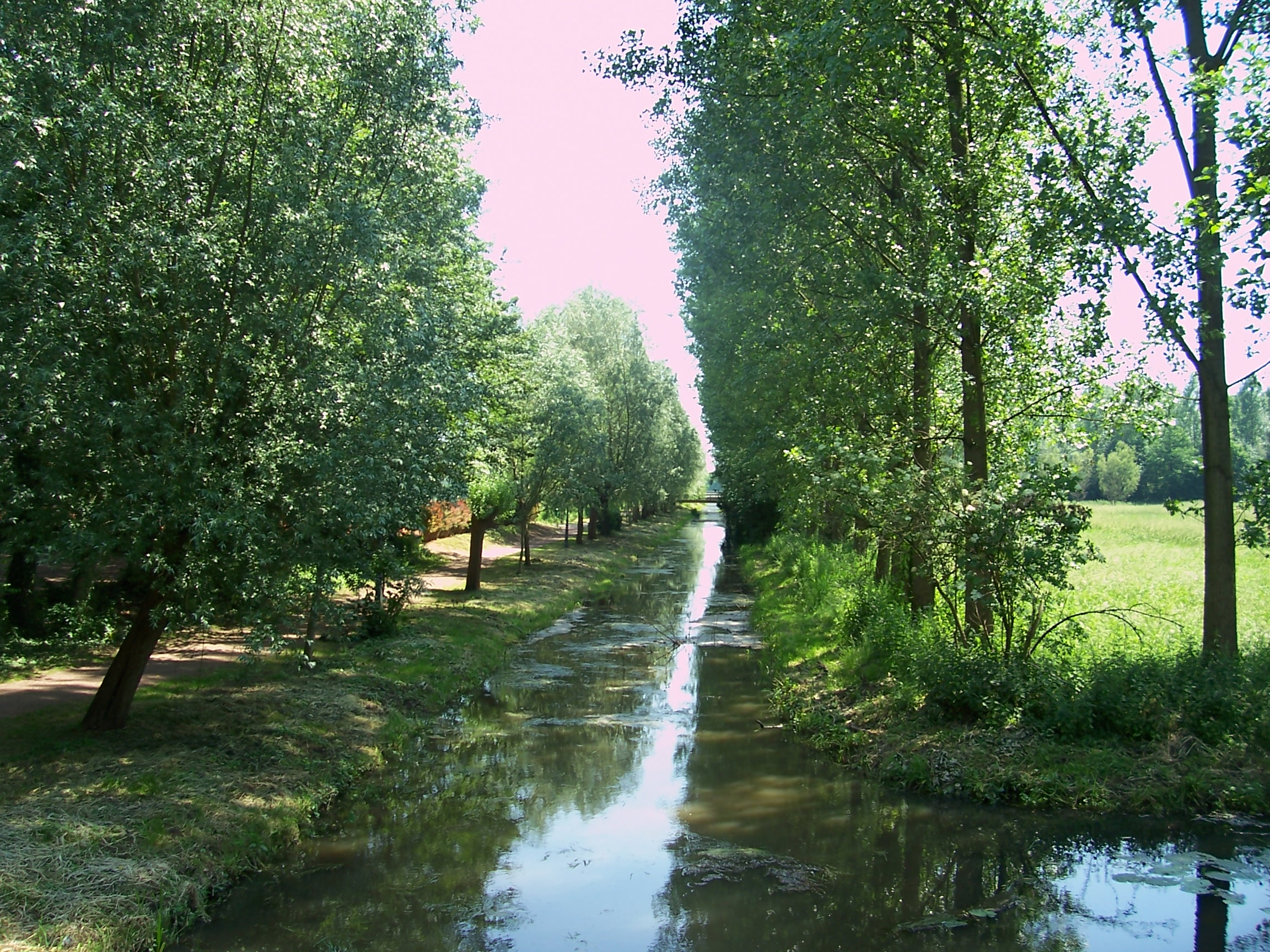

Location
- Country: Germany
- State: North Rhine-Westphalia

Physical characteristics
- Mouth
  - location: Niers
  - coordinates: 51.5889°N 6.2852°E
- Length: 24.8 km (15.4 mi)

Basin features
- Progression: Niers→ Meuse→ North Sea

Issumer Fleuth is a river of North Rhine-Westphalia, Germany. It flows into the Niers near Kevelaer.

== See also ==
- List of rivers of North Rhine-Westphalia
