= Eusternbach =

River in Germany

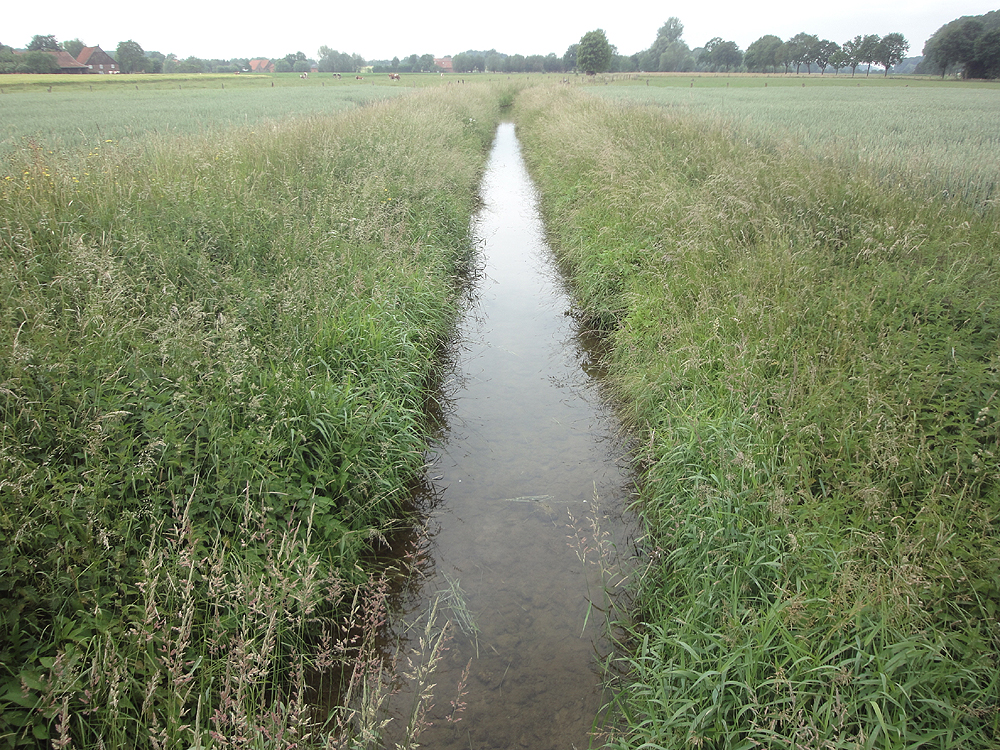

Location
- Country: Germany
- State: North Rhine-Westphalia

Physical characteristics
- Mouth
  - location: Ems
  - coordinates: 51.8289°N 8.3278°E
- Length: 15.9 km (9.9 mi)

Basin features
- Progression: Ems→ North Sea

Eusternbach is a river of North Rhine-Westphalia, Germany. It flows into the Ems in Rheda-Wiedenbrück.

== See also ==
- List of rivers of North Rhine-Westphalia
