= Ickbach =

River in Germany

Coordinates: 51°12′15″N 6°48′33″E

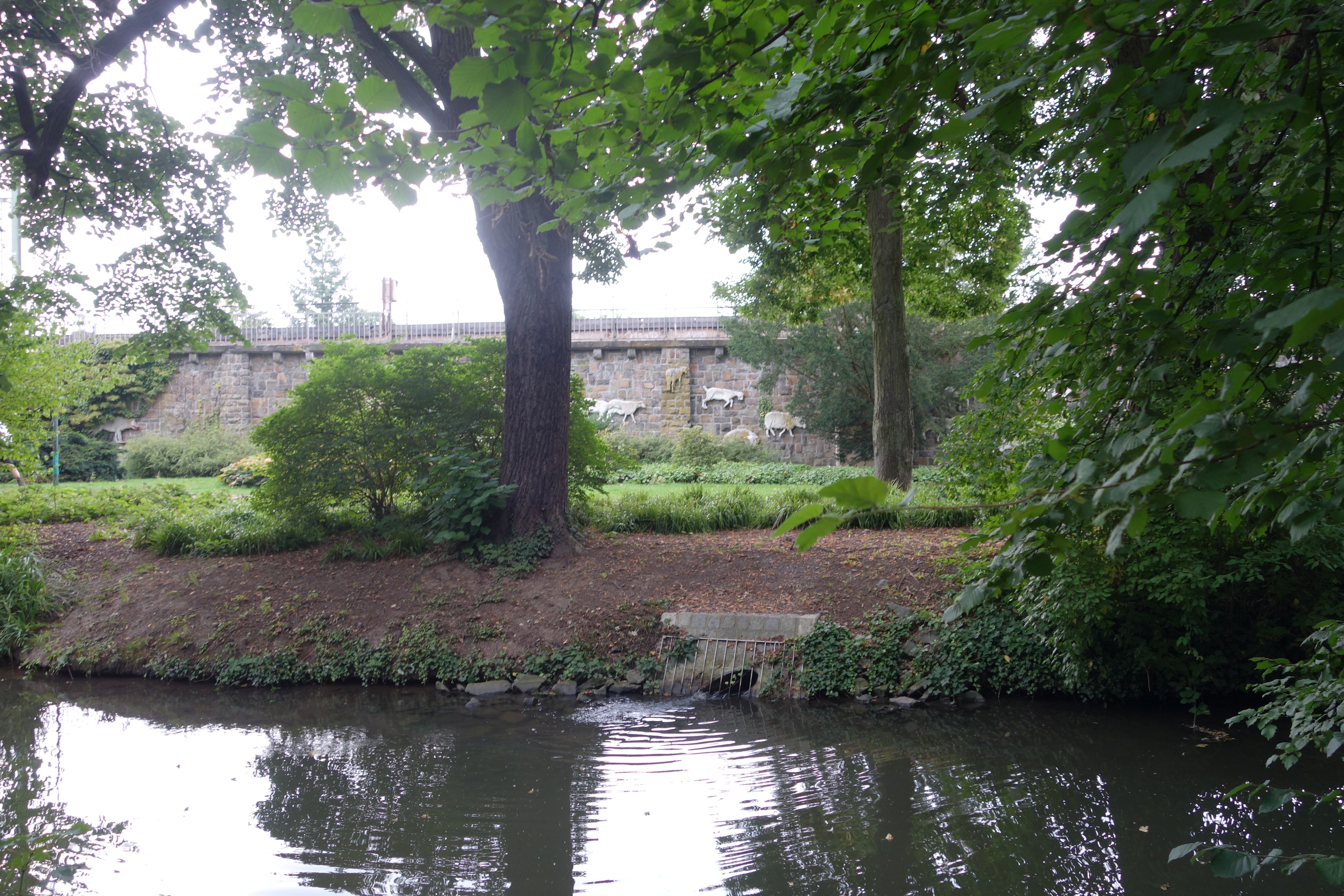

Location
- Country: Germany
- States: North Rhine-Westphalia

Ickbach is a river of Düsseldorf, North Rhine-Westphalia, Germany.

== History ==
Around the year 1900, this river was channeled underground. Since it runs completely underground and is no longer listed on current maps, its exact course is unknown. It flows into the Düssel river a little south of the Mitsubishi Electric Halle.

In 2010 it was accidentally discovered during construction work.

== See also ==
- List of rivers of North Rhine-Westphalia
