= Edelrather Bach =

River in Germany

Location
- Country: Germany
- State: North Rhine-Westphalia

Physical characteristics
- Mouth
  - location: Dhünn
  - coordinates: 51.0281°N 7.0696°E

Basin features
- Progression: Dhünn→ Wupper→ Rhine→ North Sea

Edelrather Bach is a small river of North Rhine-Westphalia, Germany. It is 1 km long and flows into the Dhünn near Leverkusen.

== See also ==
- List of rivers of North Rhine-Westphalia
