= Emsdettener Mühlenbach =

River in Germany

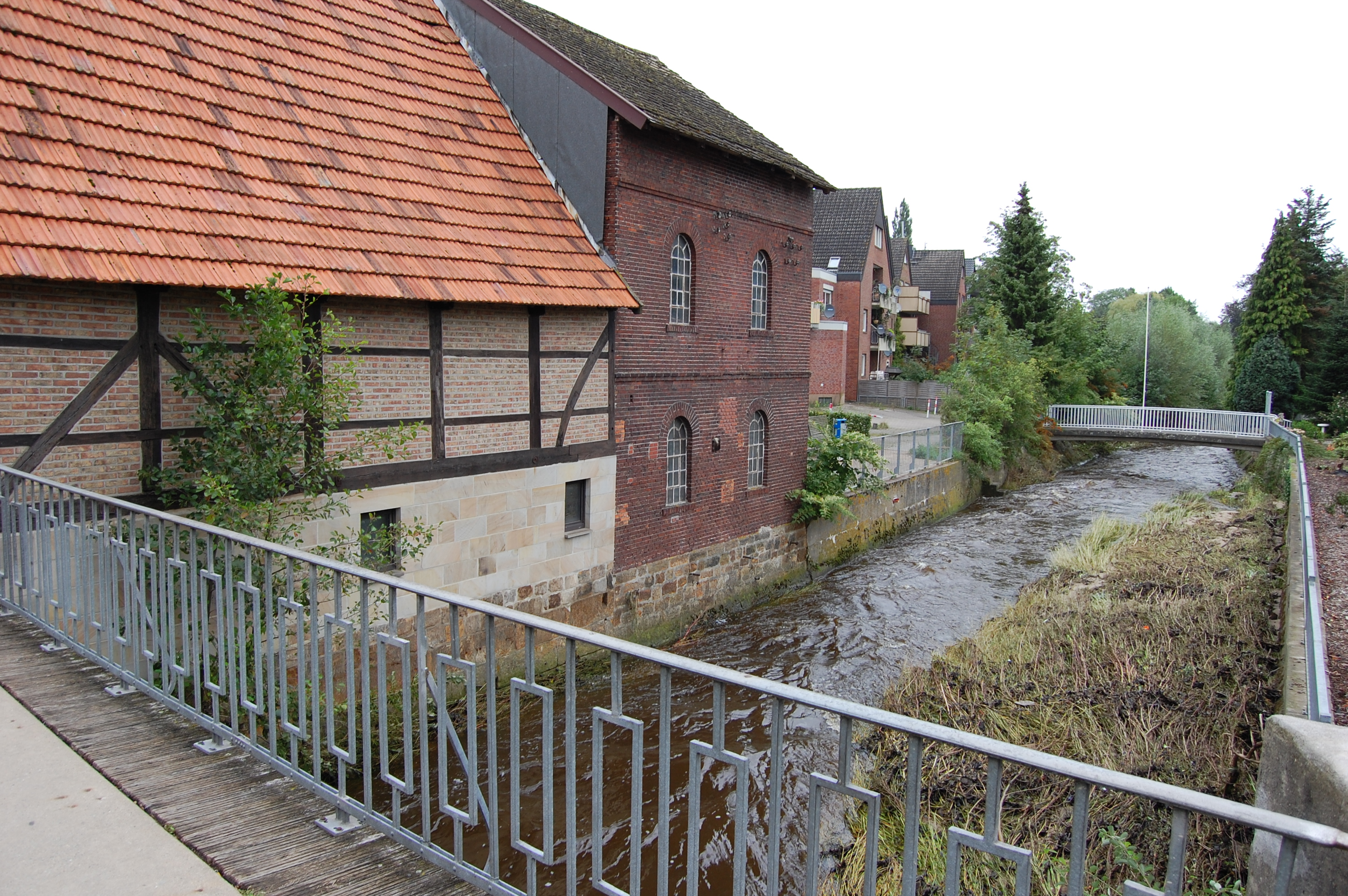

Location
- Country: Germany
- State: North Rhine-Westphalia

Physical characteristics
- Mouth
  - location: Ems
  - coordinates: 52.1805°N 7.5443°E
- Length: 19.6 km (12.2 mi)

Basin features
- Progression: Ems→ North Sea

Emsdettener Mühlenbach is a river of North Rhine-Westphalia, Germany and is a tributary of River Ems in Emsdetten. It has a length of 19.6 kilometers.

== See also ==
- List of rivers of North Rhine-Westphalia
