= Hunnebecke =

River in Germany

Location
- Country: Germany
- States: North Rhine-Westphalia

Physical characteristics
- Mouth
  - location: Krummer Bach
  - coordinates: 51.9808°N 7.5206°E

Basin features
- Progression: Krummer Bach→ Münstersche Aa→ Ems→ North Sea

Hunnebecke is a small river of North Rhine-Westphalia, Germany. It is 4.8 km long and flows into the Krummer Bach near Münster.

== See also ==
- List of rivers of North Rhine-Westphalia
