= Alche =

River in Germany

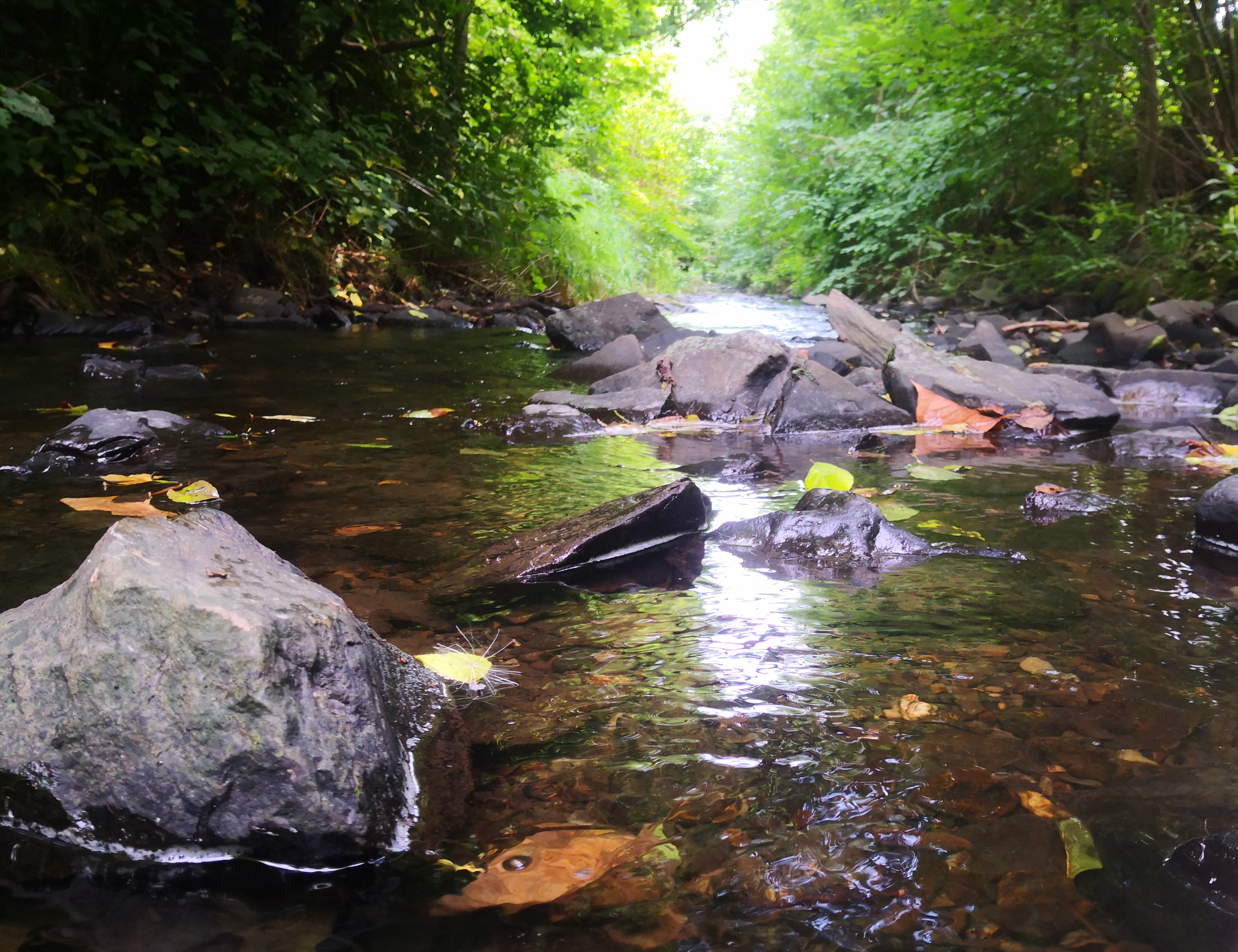

Location
- Country: Germany
- State: North Rhine-Westphalia

Physical characteristics
- Mouth
  - location: Sieg
  - coordinates: 50.8717°N 8.0109°E
- Length: 11.5 km (7.1 mi)

Basin features
- Progression: Sieg→ Rhine→ North Sea

Alche is a river of North Rhine-Westphalia, Germany. It flows into the Sieg in Siegen.

== See also ==
- List of rivers of North Rhine-Westphalia
