= Hellbach =

River in Germany

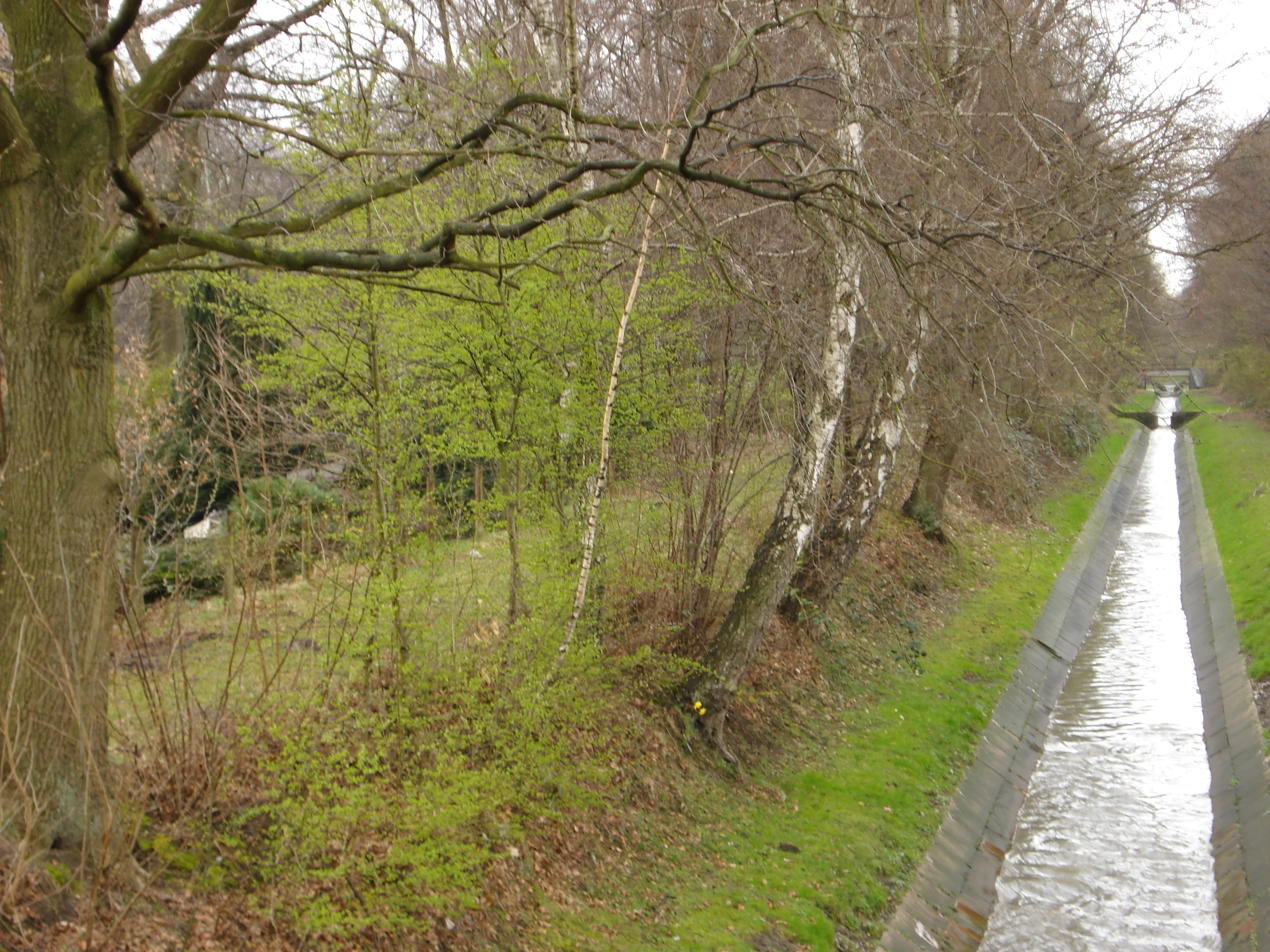

Location
- Country: Germany
- States: North Rhine-Westphalia

Physical characteristics
- Mouth
  - location: Emscher
  - coordinates: 51°33′35″N 07°12′17″E

Basin features
- Progression: Emscher→ Rhine→ North Sea

Hellbach is a small river of North Rhine-Westphalia, Germany. It is 6.7 km long and flows into the Emscher near Herne.

It is one of nine rivers and streams in North Rhine-Westphalia named Hellbach.

== See also ==
- List of rivers of North Rhine-Westphalia
