= Derenbach (Bröl) =

River in Germany

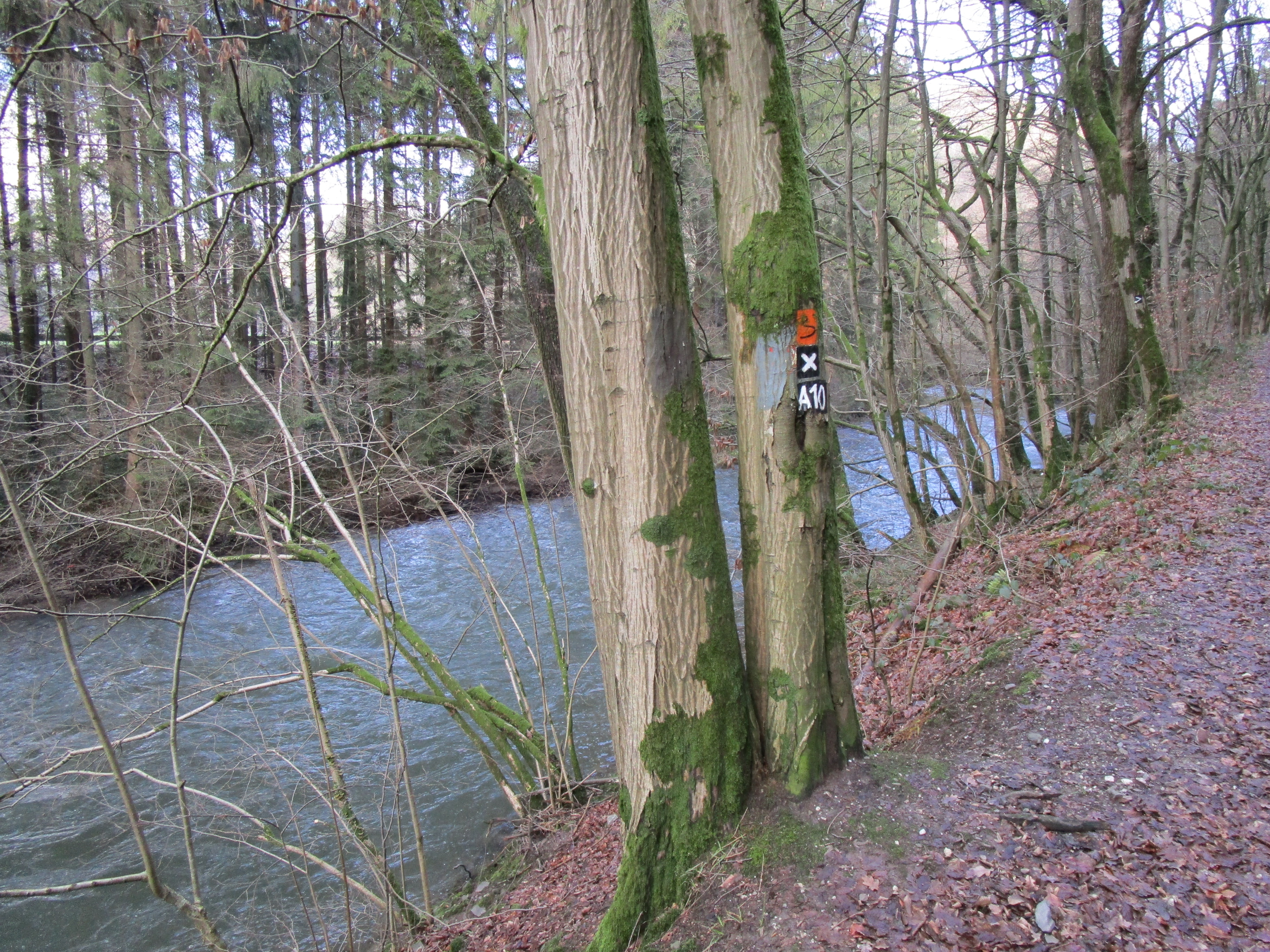

Location
- Country: Germany
- State: North Rhine-Westphalia

Physical characteristics
- Mouth
  - location: Bröl
  - coordinates: 50.7958°N 7.3400°E

Basin features
- Progression: Bröl→ Sieg→ Rhine→ North Sea

Derenbach is a river of North Rhine-Westphalia, Germany. It is 7.7 km long, and a left tributary of the Bröl.

== See also ==
- List of rivers of North Rhine-Westphalia
