= Leyerbach =

River in Germany

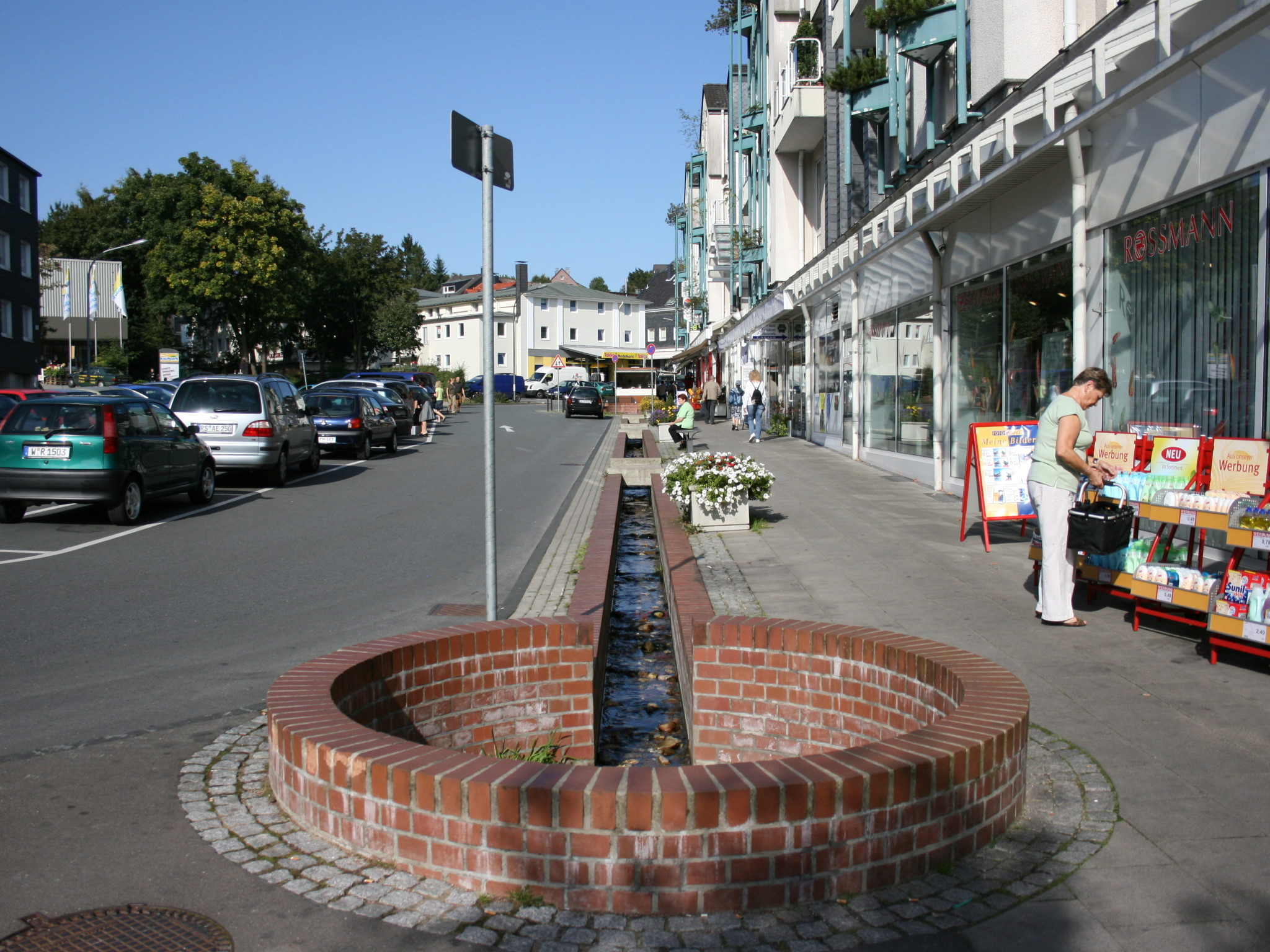

Location
- Country: Germany
- States: North Rhine-Westphalia

Physical characteristics
- Mouth
  - location: Morsbach
  - coordinates: 51°11′55″N 07°11′38″E

Basin features
- Progression: RMorsbach (Wupper)

Leyerbach is a small river of North Rhine-Westphalia, Germany. It is 5.6 km long and flows into the Morsbach as a right tributary near Remscheid.

== See also ==
- List of rivers of North Rhine-Westphalia
