= Mirker Bach =

River in Germany

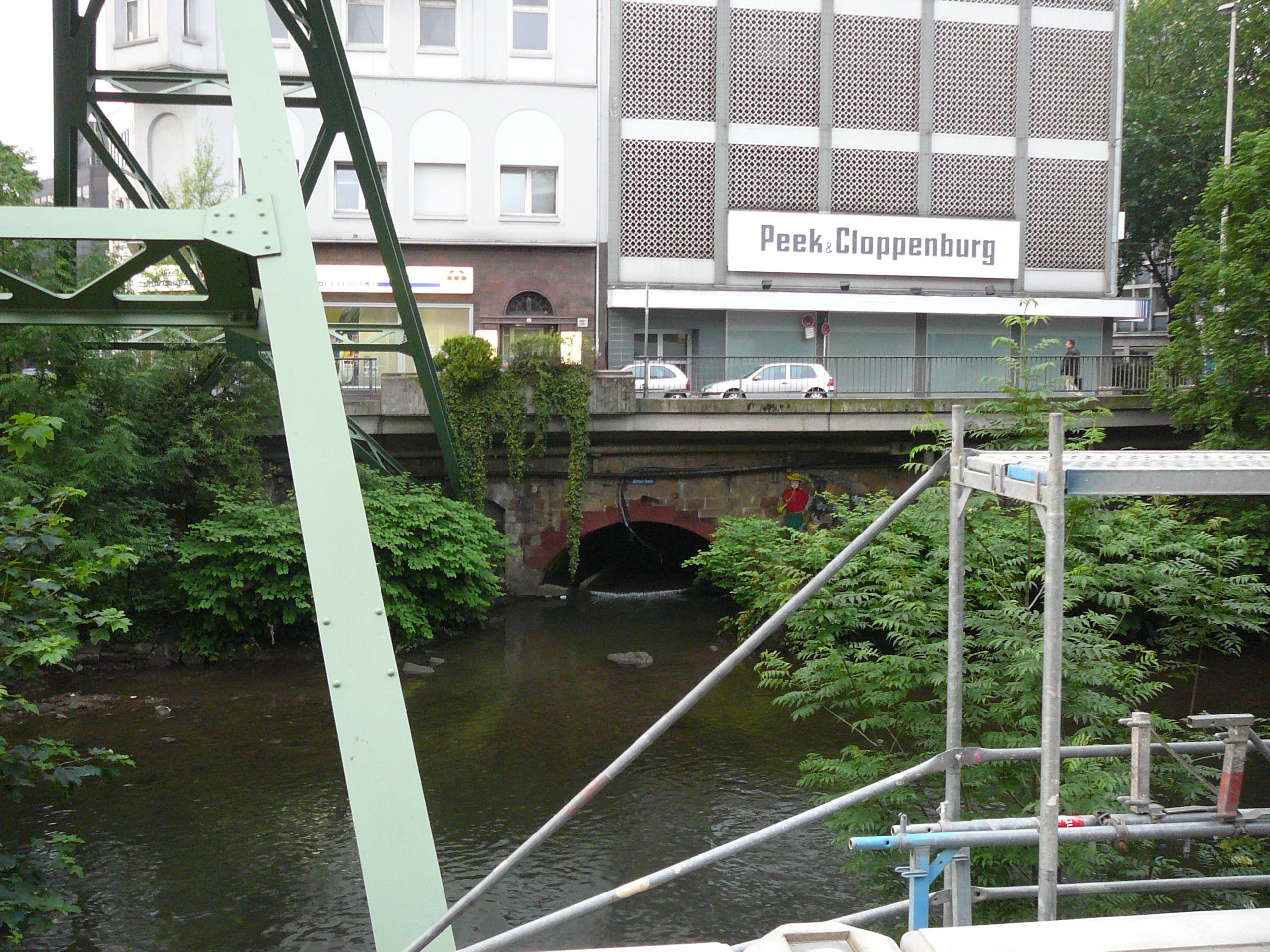

Location
- Country: Germany
- State: North Rhine-Westphalia

Physical characteristics
- Mouth
  - location: Wupper
  - coordinates: 51.2556°N 7.1461°E
- Length: 5.9 km (3.7 mi)

Basin features
- Progression: Wupper→ Rhine→ North Sea
- Tributaries
  - right: Hager Bach, Vogelsangbach, Eschenbeek

Mirker Bach is a small river in Wuppertal, North Rhine-Westphalia, Germany. It is a right tributary of the Wupper in Wuppertal-Elberfeld.

== See also ==
- List of rivers of North Rhine-Westphalia
