= Ankerbach =

River in Germany

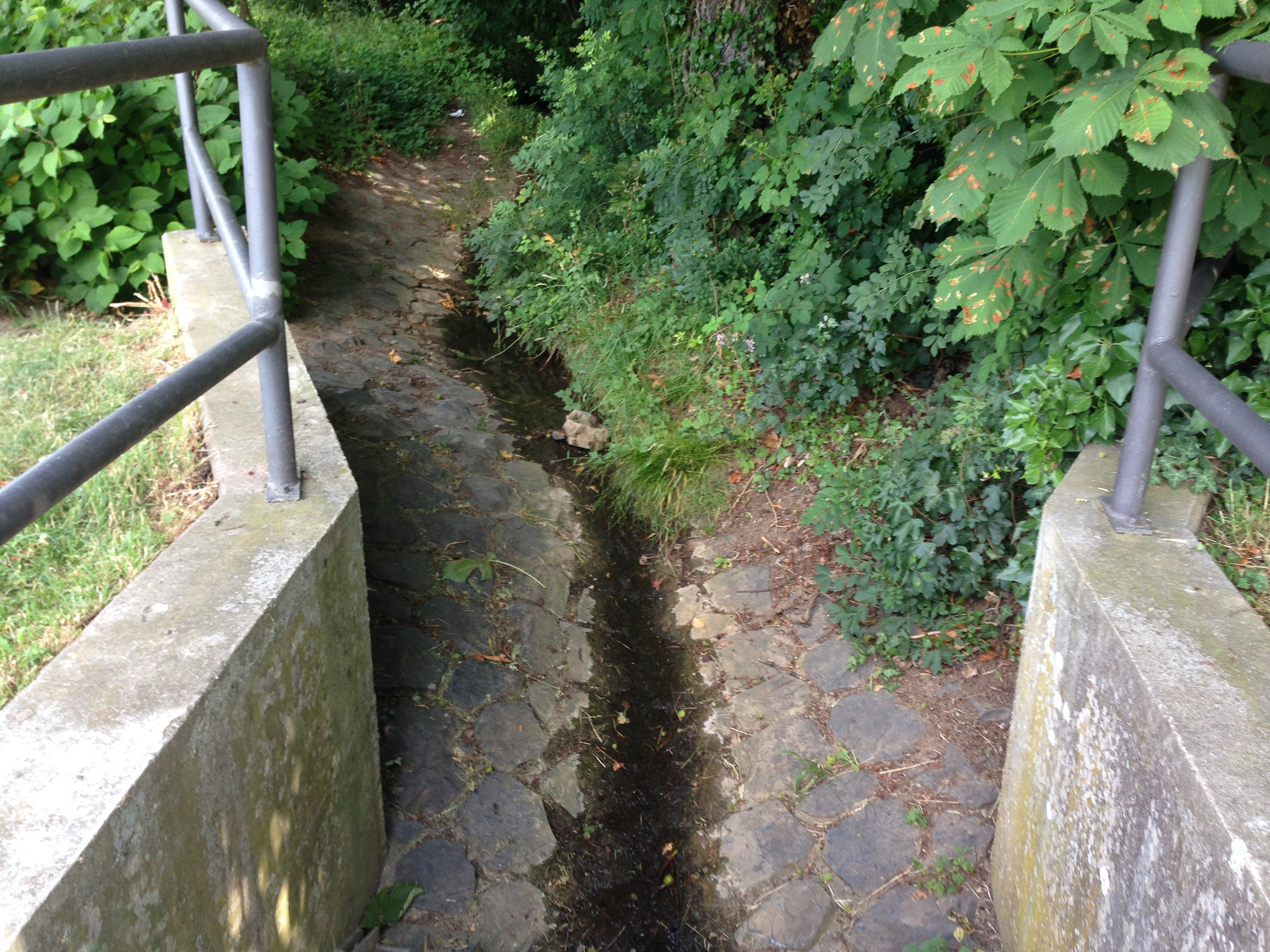

Location
- Country: Germany
- State: North Rhine-Westphalia

Physical characteristics
- Mouth
  - location: Rhine
  - coordinates: 50.7155°N 7.1554°E
- Length: 4.374 km (2.718 mi)

Basin features
- Progression: Rhine→ North Sea

Ankerbach is a small river of North Rhine-Westphalia, Germany. It has a length of 4.4 km and its drainage basin has am area of 3 km^{2}. It joins the Rhine river at km 650.55, near Bonn.

== See also ==
- List of rivers of North Rhine-Westphalia
