= Netphe =

River in Germany

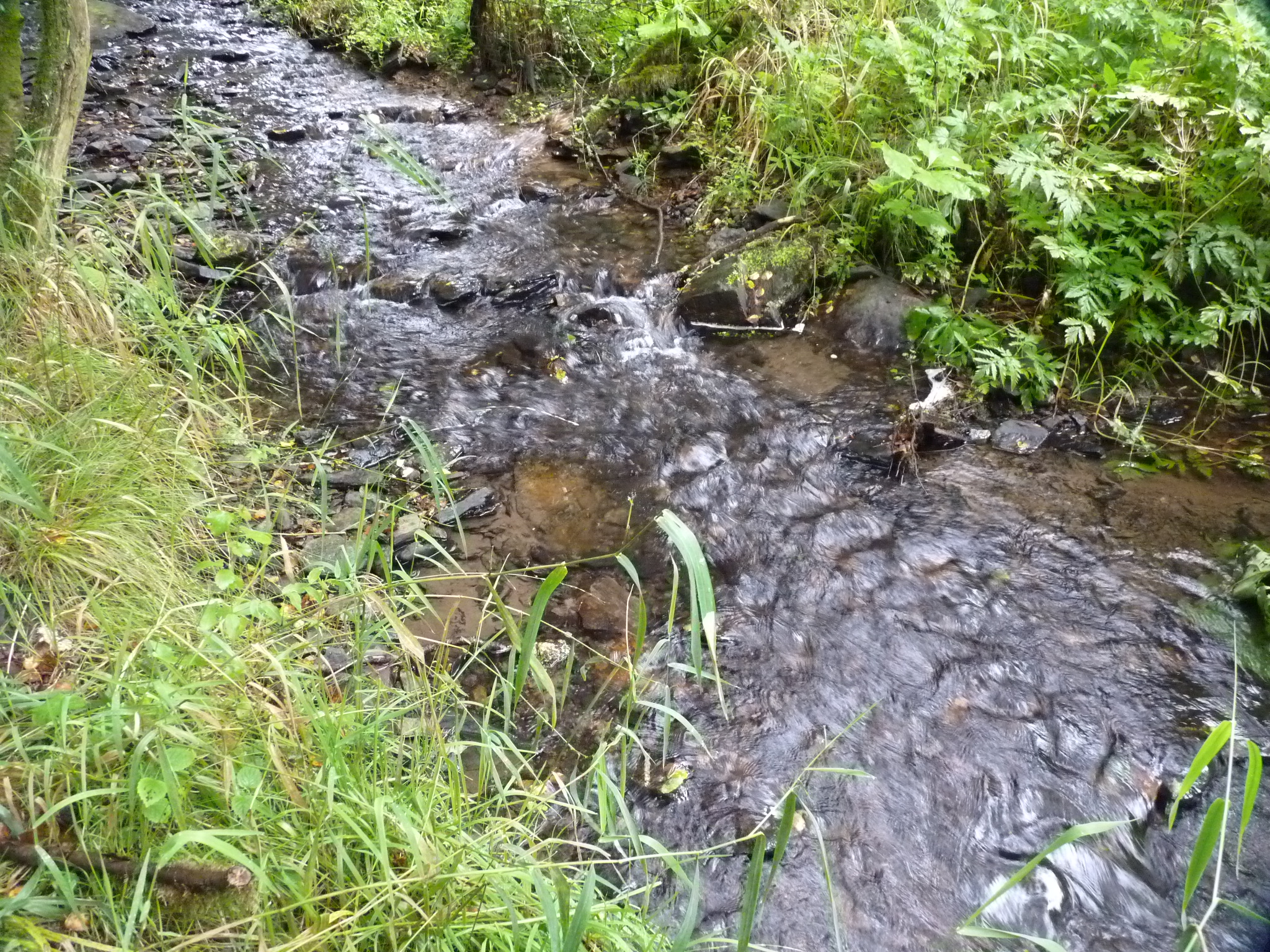

Location
- Country: Germany
- State: North Rhine-Westphalia

Physical characteristics
- Mouth
  - location: Sieg
  - coordinates: 50.9131°N 8.0951°E
- Length: 10.8 km (6.7 mi)

Basin features
- Progression: Sieg→ Rhine→ North Sea

Netphe is a river of North Rhine-Westphalia, Germany. It flows into the Sieg in Netphen.

== See also ==
- List of rivers of North Rhine-Westphalia
