= Mersbach =

River in Germany

Location
- Country: Germany
- States: North Rhine-Westphalia

Physical characteristics
- Mouth
  - location: Vilicher Bach
  - coordinates: 50.7323°N 7.1892°E

Basin features
- Progression: Vilicher Bach→ Rhine→ North Sea

Mersbach is a small river of North Rhine-Westphalia, Germany. It flows into the Vilicher Bach near Bonn-Niederholtorf.

== See also ==
- List of rivers of North Rhine-Westphalia
