= Dettmers Bach =

River in Germany

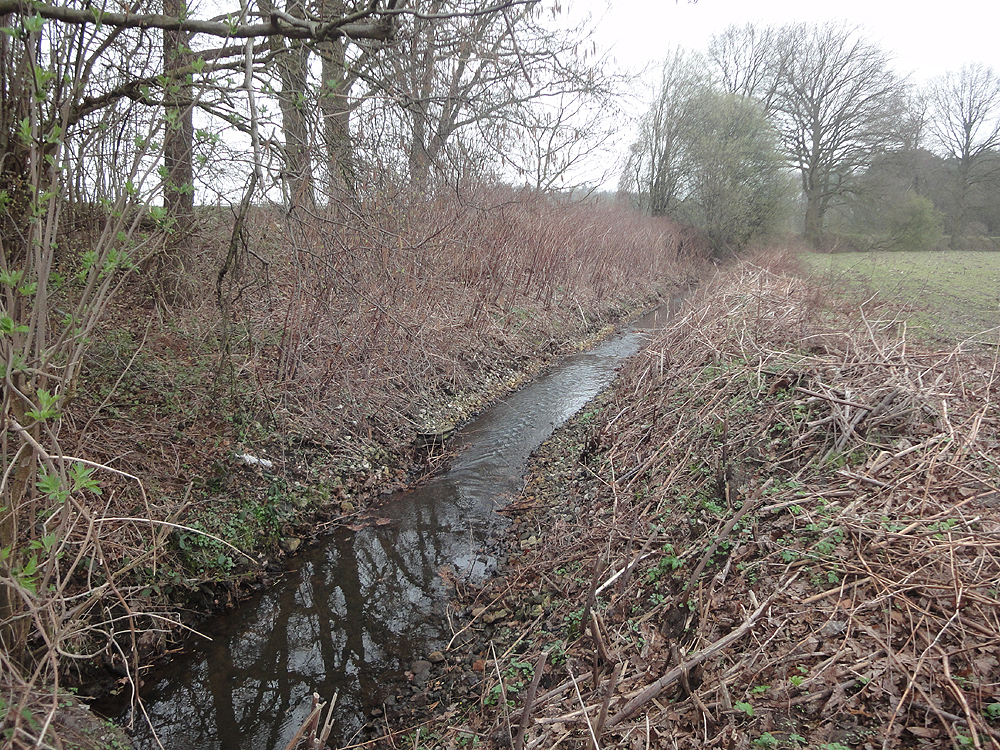

Location
- Country: Germany
- State: North Rhine-Westphalia

Physical characteristics
- Mouth
  - location: Ems
  - coordinates: 51.9200°N 8.2942°E

Basin features
- Progression: Ems→ North Sea

Dettmersbach is a small river of North Rhine-Westphalia, Germany. It is 5.3 km long and flows into the Ems near Gütersloh.

== See also ==
- List of rivers of North Rhine-Westphalia
