= Schwarzes Siepen =

River in Germany

Location
- Country: Germany
- State: North Rhine-Westphalia

Physical characteristics
- Mouth
  - location: Lenne
  - coordinates: 51.1568°N 8.4312°E

Basin features
- Progression: Lenne→ Ruhr→ Rhine→ North Sea

The Schwarzes Siepen is a small river in North Rhine-Westphalia, Germany, right tributary of the Lenne.

== See also ==
- List of rivers of North Rhine-Westphalia
