= Kleine Emscher =

River in Germany

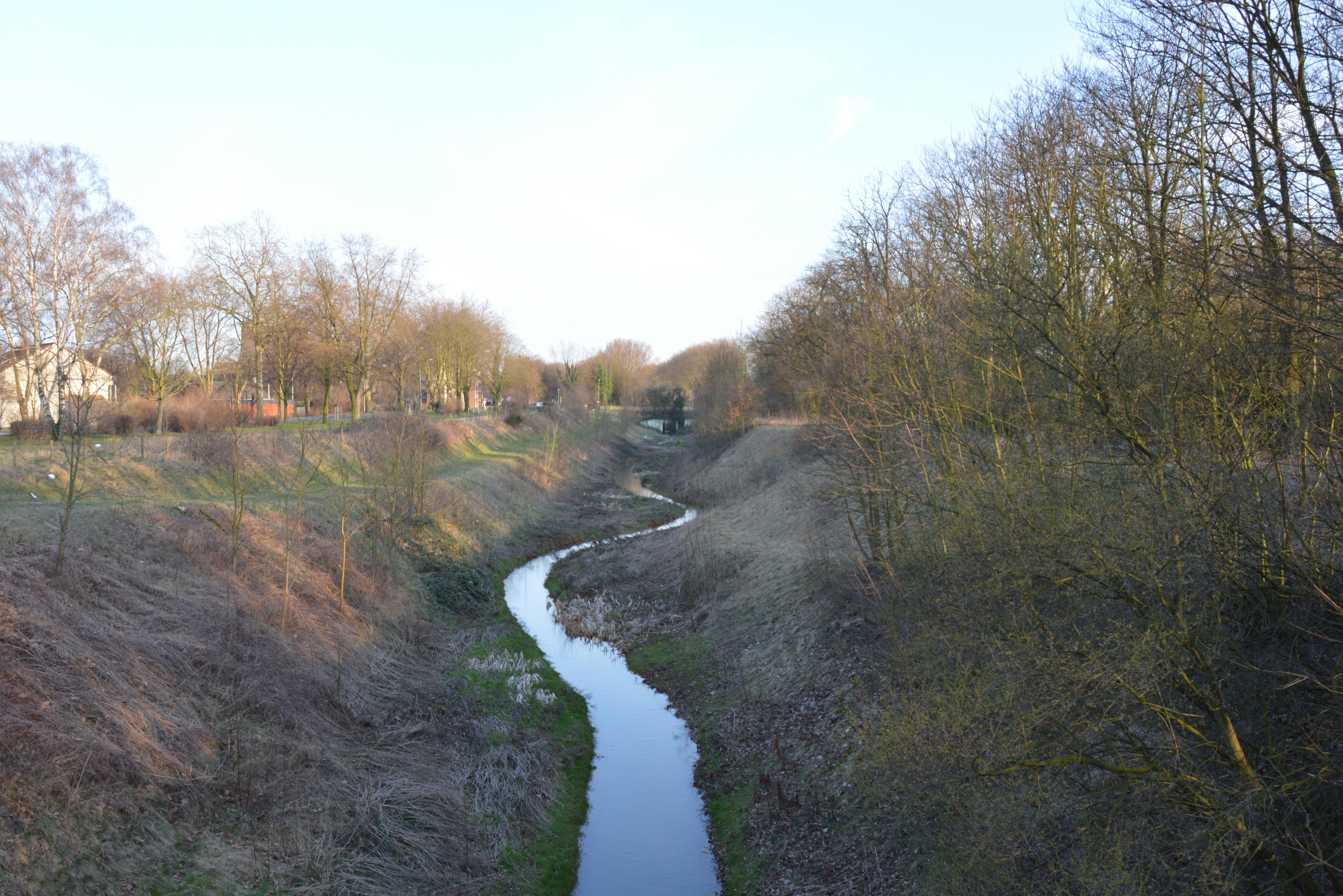

Location
- Country: Germany
- State: North Rhine-Westphalia

Physical characteristics
- Mouth
  - location: Rhine
  - coordinates: 51.5190°N 6.7164°E
- Length: 10.3 km (6.4 mi)

Basin features
- Progression: Rhine→ North Sea

Kleine Emscher is a river of North Rhine-Westphalia, Germany. The former lower course of the Emscher, it flows into the Rhine near Duisburg-Walsum.

== See also ==
- List of rivers of North Rhine-Westphalia
