= Eisernbach =

River in Germany

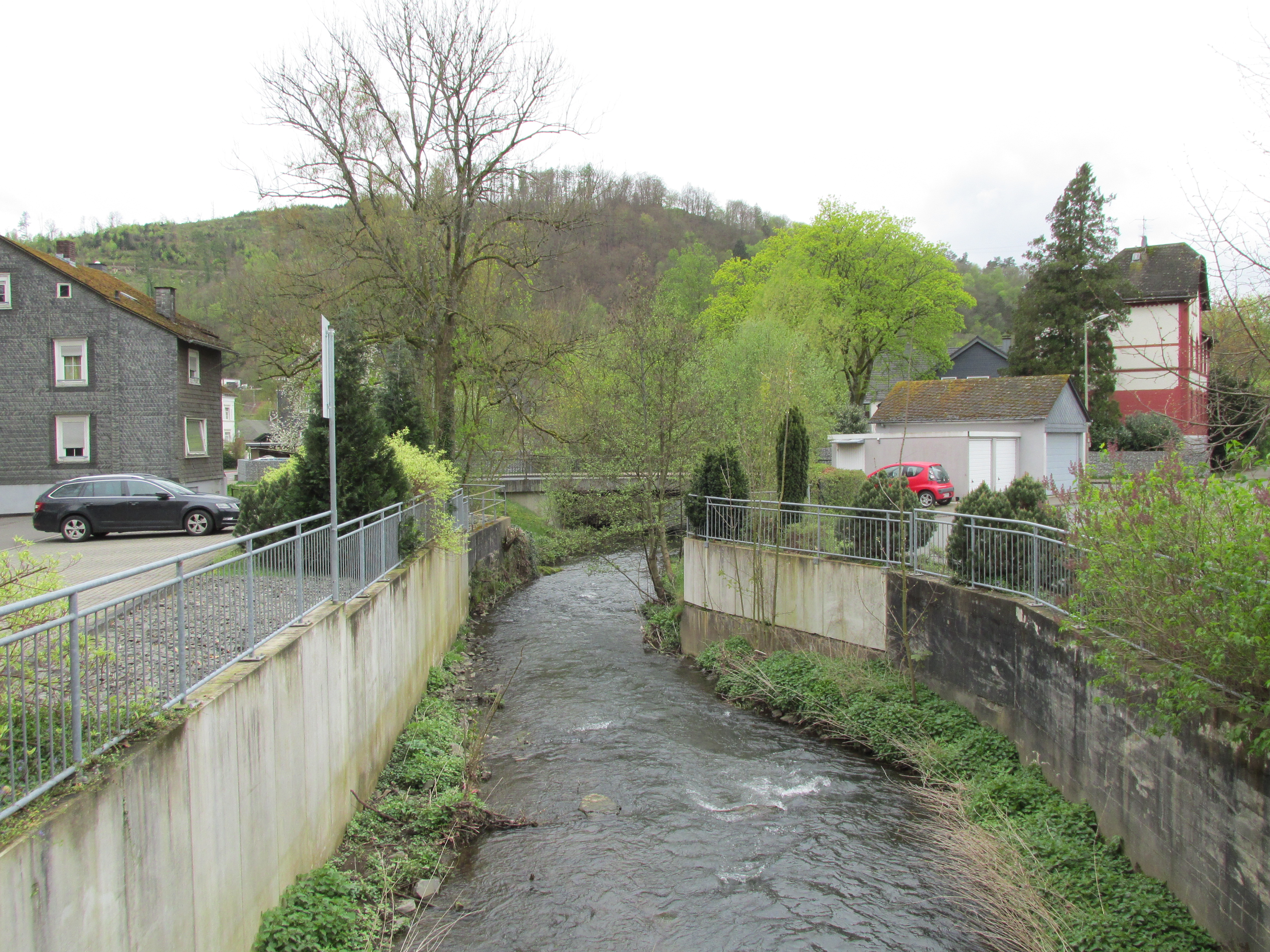

Location
- Country: Germany
- State: North Rhine-Westphalia

Physical characteristics
- Source
  - location: Schneiser-Born (South-East of Wilnsdorf)
  - elevation: 468 m (1,535 ft)
- Mouth
  - location: Sieg
  - coordinates: 50.8349°N 7.9837°E
  - elevation: 220 m (720 ft)
- Length: 13.4 km (8.3 mi)

Basin features
- Progression: Sieg→ Rhine→ North Sea

Eisernbach is a river of North Rhine-Westphalia, Germany. It flows into the Sieg near Siegen.

== See also ==
- List of rivers of North Rhine-Westphalia
