= Duffesbach =

River in Germany

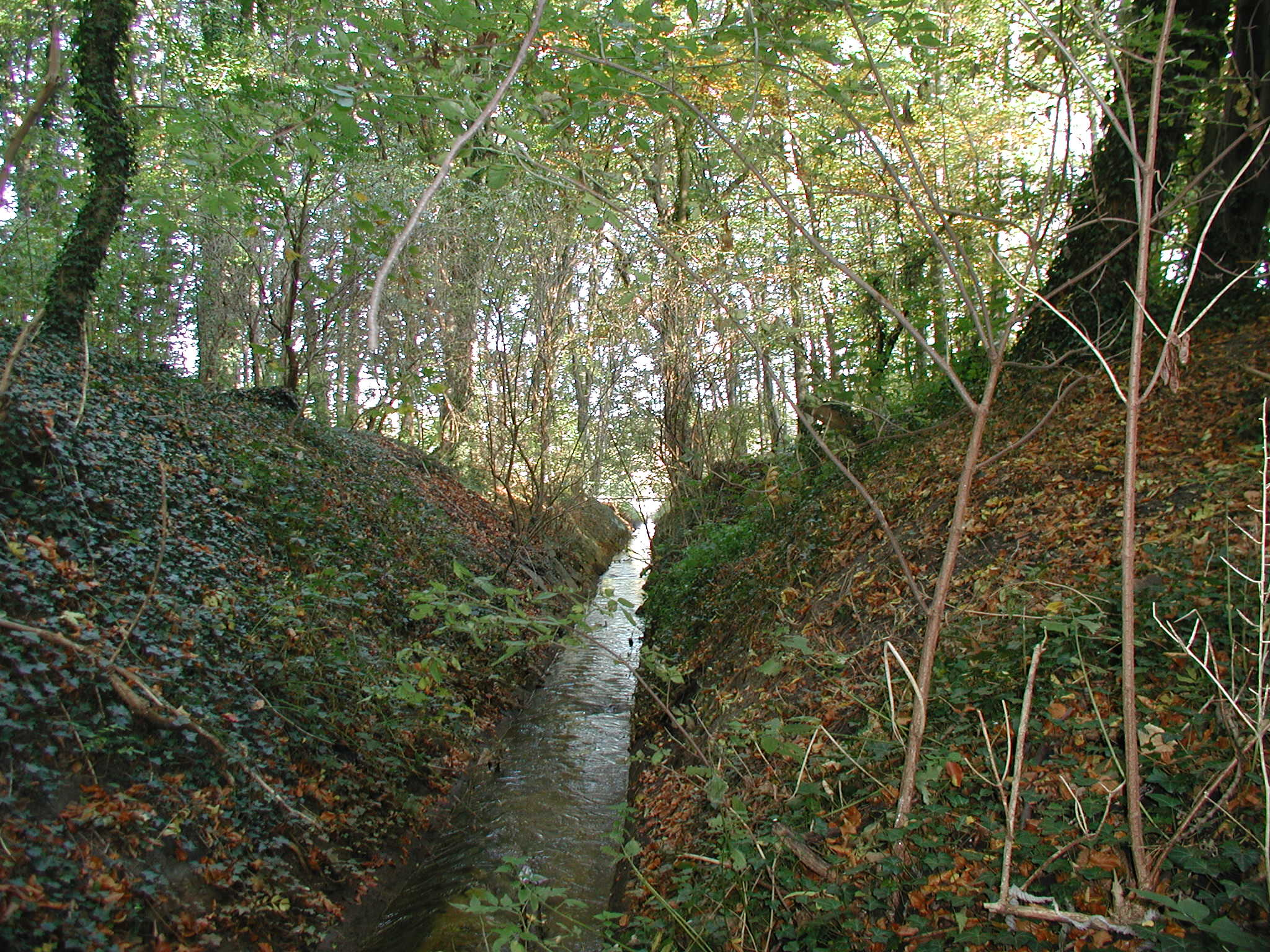

Location
- Country: Germany
- State: North Rhine-Westphalia

Physical characteristics
- Mouth
  - location: Rhine
  - coordinates: 50.9342°N 6.9636°E
- Length: 12.9 km (8.0 mi)

Basin features
- Progression: Rhine→ North Sea

Duffesbach is a small river of North Rhine-Westphalia, Germany. It flows into the Rhine in Cologne.

== See also ==
- List of rivers of North Rhine-Westphalia
