= Dortenbach =

River in Germany

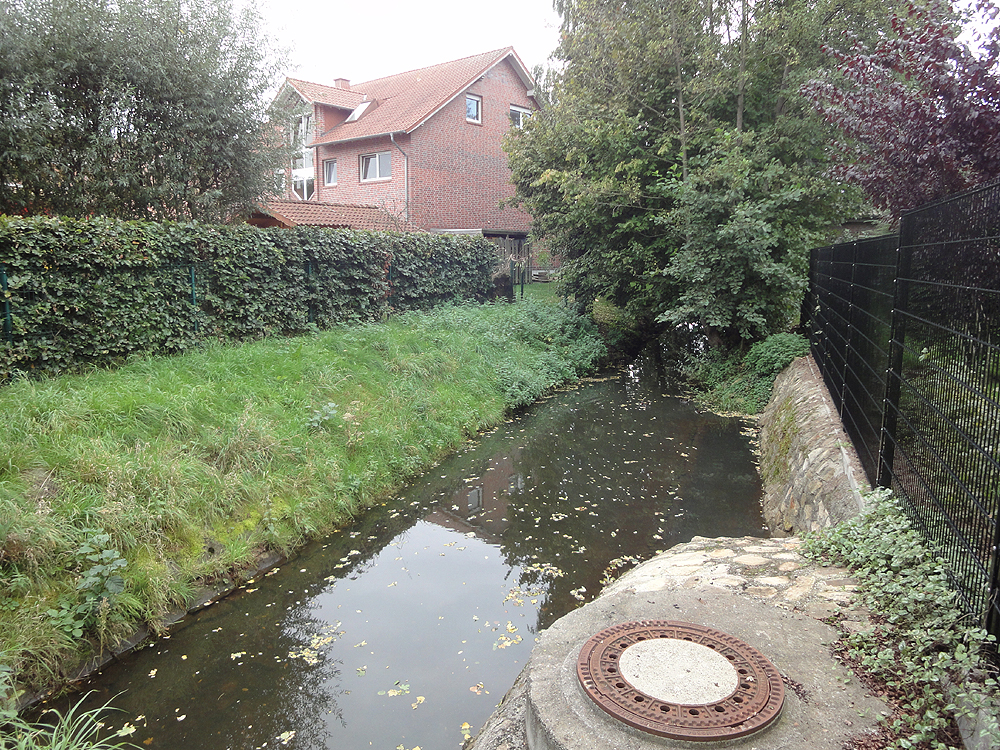

Location
- Country: Germany
- State: North Rhine-Westphalia

Physical characteristics
- Mouth
  - location: Ems
  - coordinates: 51.8118°N 8.4205°E

Basin features
- Progression: Ems→ North Sea

Dortenbach is a small river of North Rhine-Westphalia, Germany. It is 3.2 km long flows into the Ems in Rietberg.

== See also ==
- List of rivers of North Rhine-Westphalia
