= Rottscheider Bach =

River in Germany

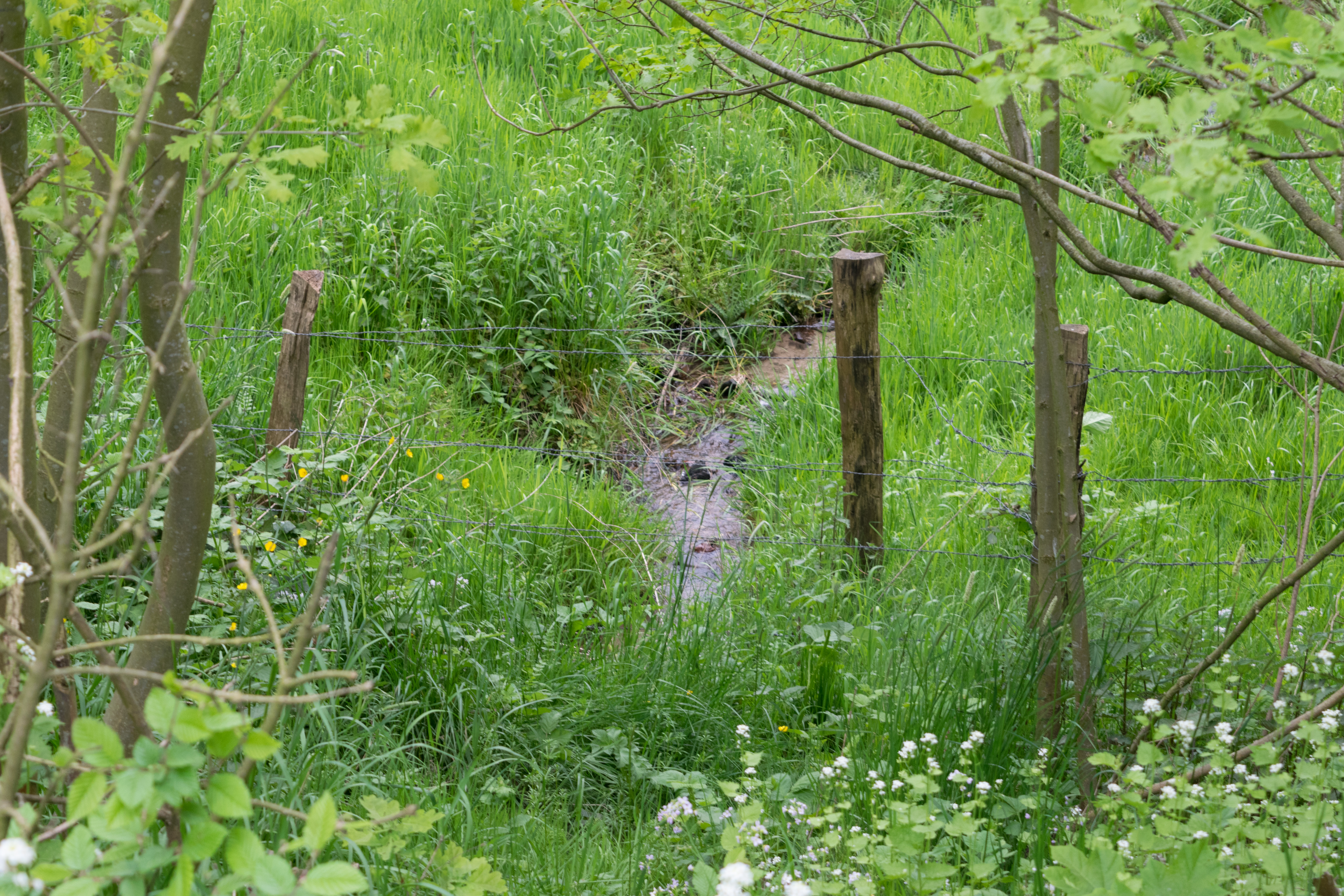

Location
- Country: Germany
- State: North Rhine-Westphalia

Physical characteristics
- Mouth
  - location: Wupper
  - coordinates: 51.2361°N 7.0906°E

Basin features
- Progression: Wupper→ Rhine→ North Sea
- Tributaries
  - right: Stackenberger Bach

Rottscheider Bach is a small river of North Rhine-Westphalia, Germany. It is 2.8 km (1.7 mi) long and flows as a right tributary into the Wupper in Wuppertal.

== See also ==
- List of rivers of North Rhine-Westphalia
