= Linkläuer Bach =

River in Germany

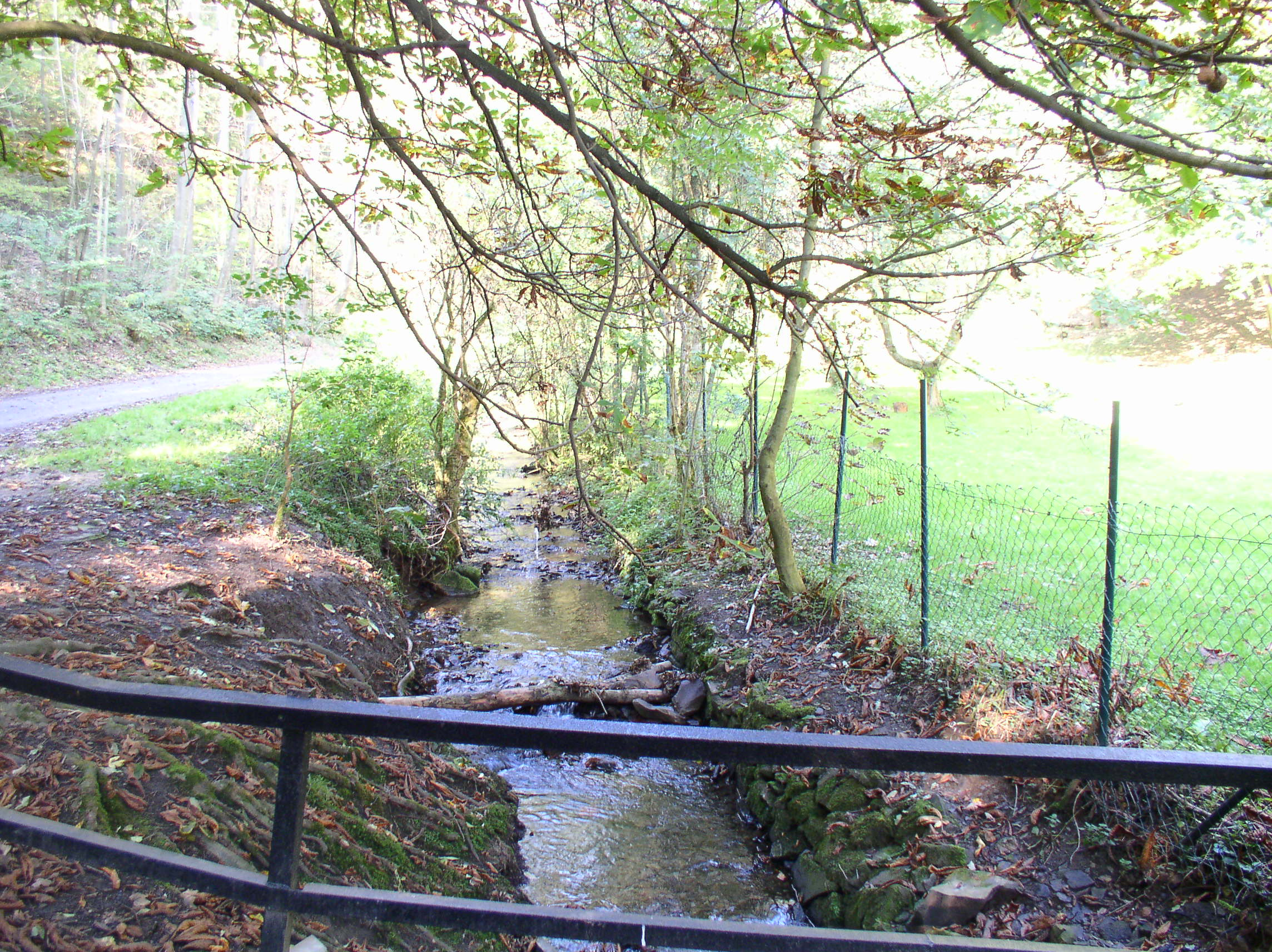

Location
- Country: Germany
- States: North Rhine-Westphalia

Physical characteristics
- Mouth
  - location: Lobach
  - coordinates: 51.1654°N 7.1693°E

Basin features
- Progression: Lobach→ Eschbach→ Wupper→ Rhine→ North Sea

Linkläuer Bach is a small river of North Rhine-Westphalia, Germany. It is 1.9 km long flows into the Lobach as a right tributary near Remscheid.

== See also ==
- List of rivers of North Rhine-Westphalia
