= Schmalenhofer Bach =

River of North Rhine-Westphalia, Germany

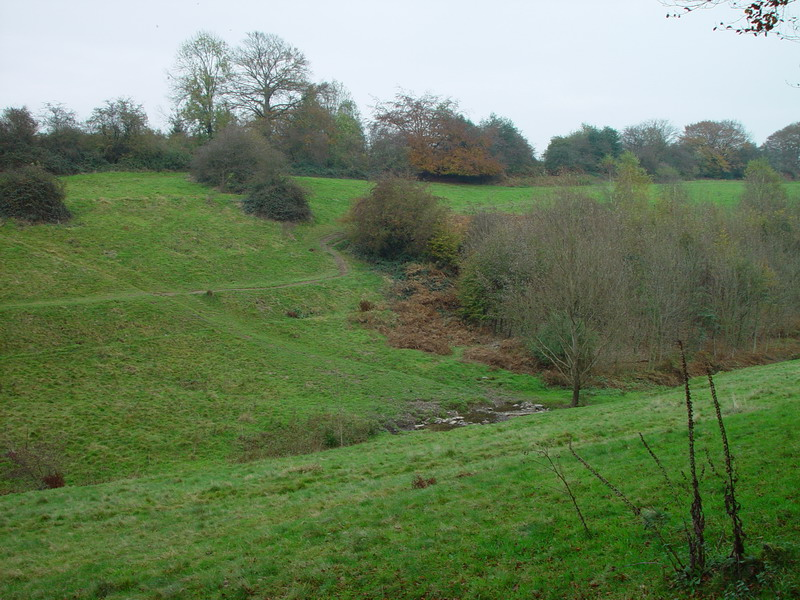

Location
- Country: Germany
- States: North Rhine-Westphalia

Physical characteristics
- Mouth
  - location: Blombach
  - coordinates: 51.2487°N 7.2251°E

Basin features
- Progression: Blombach→ Wupper→ Rhine→ North Sea

Schmalenhofer Bach is a small river of North Rhine-Westphalia, Germany. It is 2 km (1.2 mi) long and flows as a left tributary into the Blombach near Wuppertal.

== See also ==
- List of rivers of North Rhine-Westphalia
