= Schellenbeck =

River in Germany

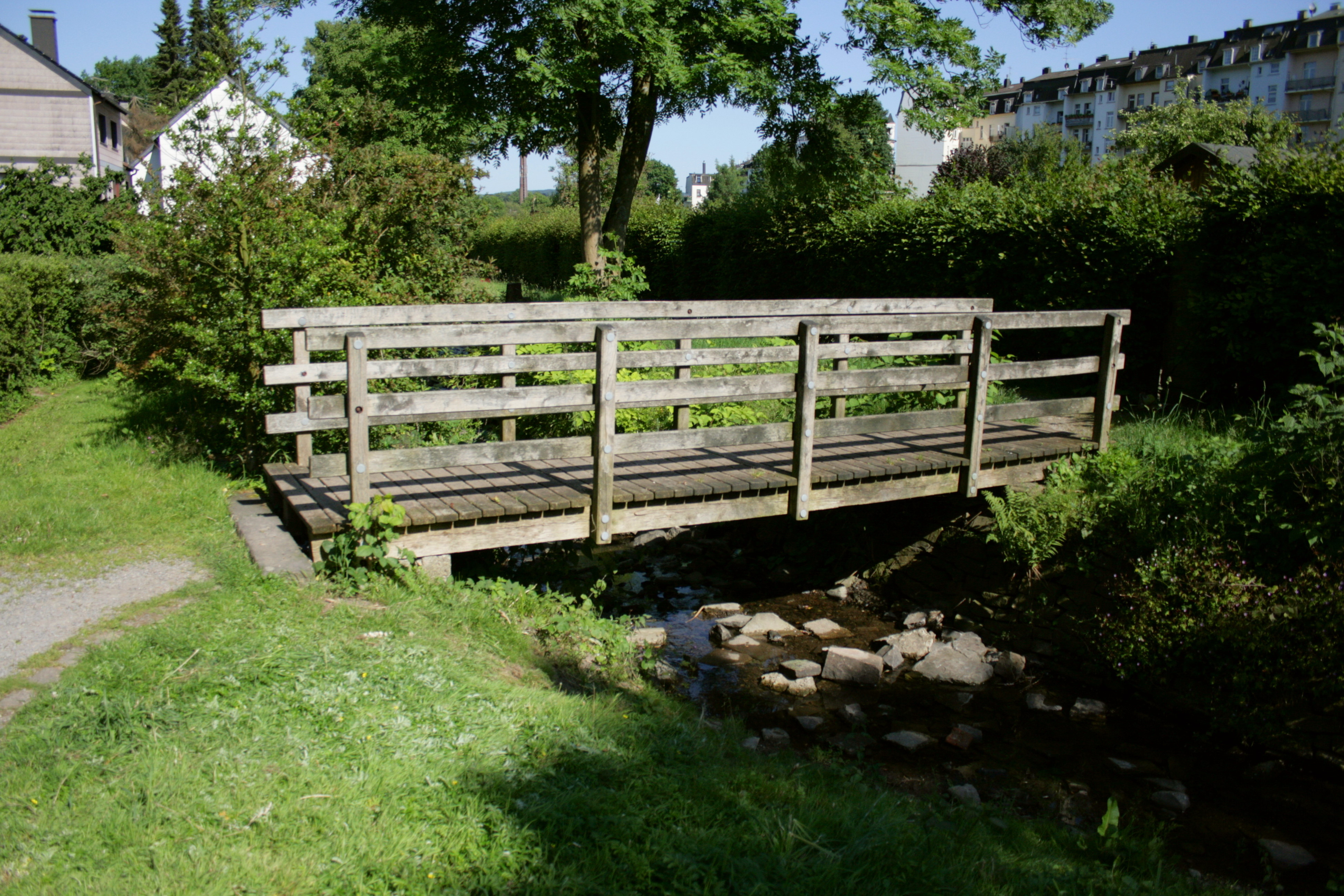

Location
- Country: Germany
- States: North Rhine-Westphalia

Physical characteristics
- Mouth
  - location: Schwarzbach
  - coordinates: 51.2867°N 7.2303°E

Basin features
- Progression: Schwarzbach→ Wupper→ Rhine→ North Sea

Schellenbeck (also: Schellenbecker Bach) is a small river of North Rhine-Westphalia, Germany. It is 2.1 km (1.3 mi) long and flows into the Schwarzbach as a right tributary near Wuppertal.

== See also ==
- List of rivers of North Rhine-Westphalia
