= Weierbach =

Weierbach may refer to:

- Weierbach (Brunsbach), a river of North Rhine-Westphalia, Germany, right tributary of the Brunsbach
- Weierbach, a community today part of Idar-Oberstein, Rhineland-Palatinate, Germany
