= Lobach (Eschbach) =

River in Germany

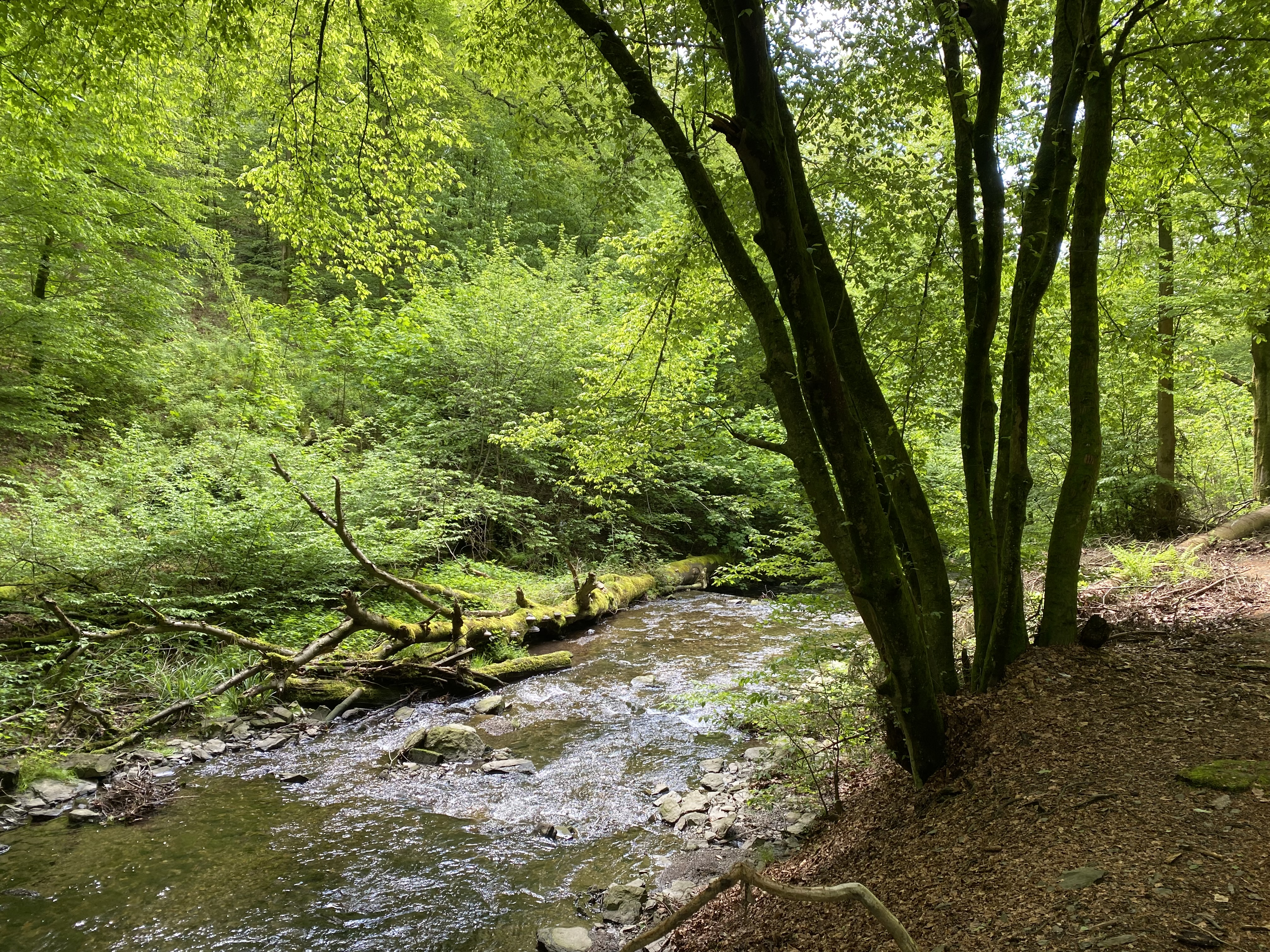

Location
- Country: Germany
- States: North Rhine-Westphalia

Physical characteristics
- Mouth
  - location: Eschbach
  - coordinates: 51.1552°N 7.1601°E

Basin features
- Progression: Eschbach→ Wupper→ Rhine→ North Sea

Lobach is a small river of North Rhine-Westphalia, Germany. It is 4.3 km long and flows into the Eschbach as a right tributary near Remscheid.

== See also ==
- List of rivers of North Rhine-Westphalia
