= Eistringhauser Bach =

River in Germany

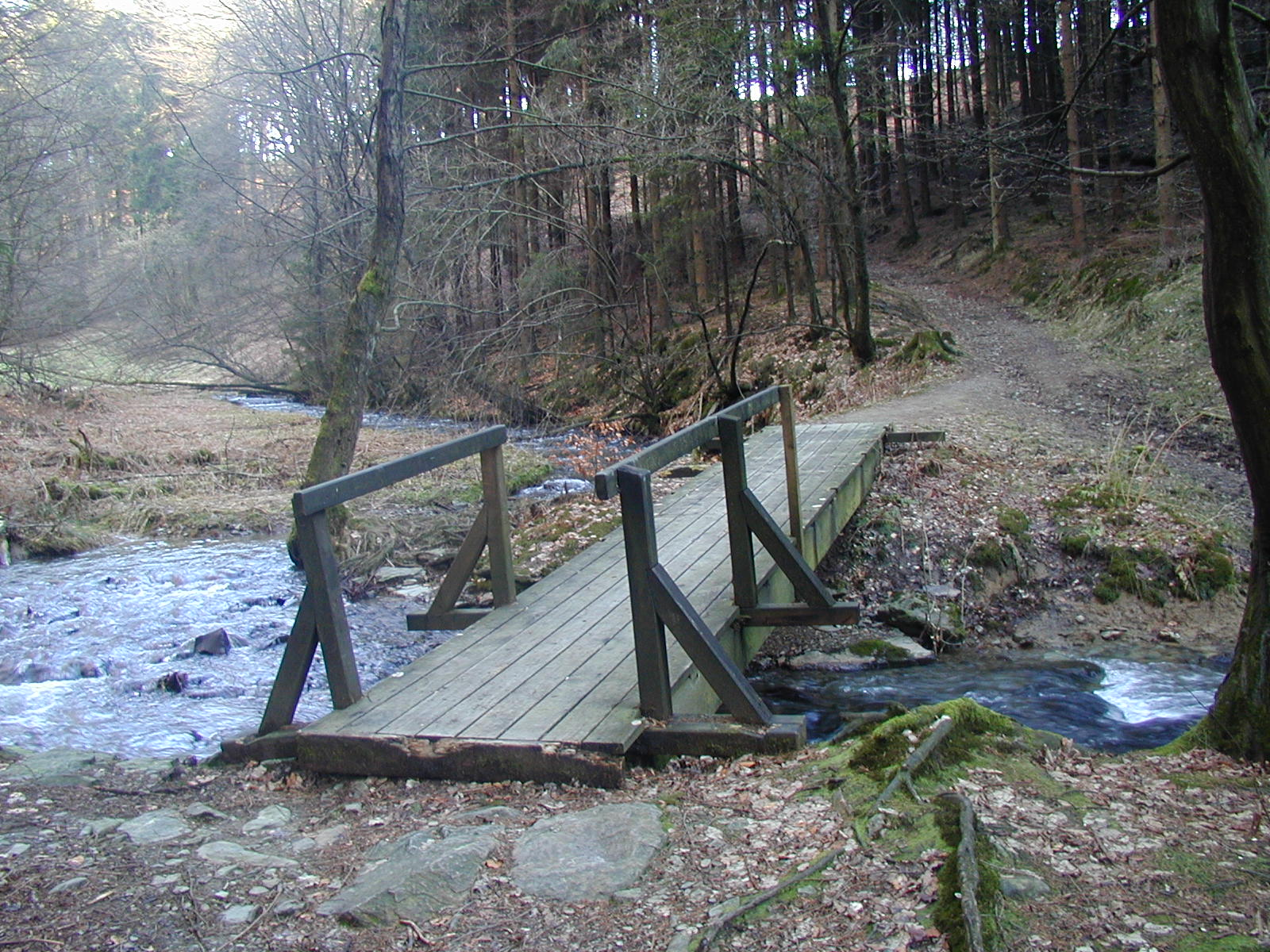

Location
- Country: Germany
- State: North Rhine-Westphalia

Physical characteristics
- Mouth
  - location: Uelfe
  - coordinates: 51.2123°N 7.3274°E

Basin features
- Progression: Uelfe→ Wupper→ Rhine→ North Sea

Eistringhauser Bach is a small river of North Rhine-Westphalia, Germany. It flows into the Uelfe near Radevormwald.

== See also ==
- List of rivers of North Rhine-Westphalia
