= Brebach =

Brebach may refer to:

- Brebach (Spreeler Bach), a river of North Rhine-Westphalia, Germany
- Brebach, a former municipality, today part of Saarbrücken, Germany
