= Rutenbeck =

Rutenbeck may refer to:

- Rutenbeck (Wupper), a river of North Rhine-Westphalia, Germany, tributary of the Wupper
- the village Rutenbeck, part of the municipality Bliedersdorf, Lower Saxony, Germany
