= Weltersbach =

River in Germany

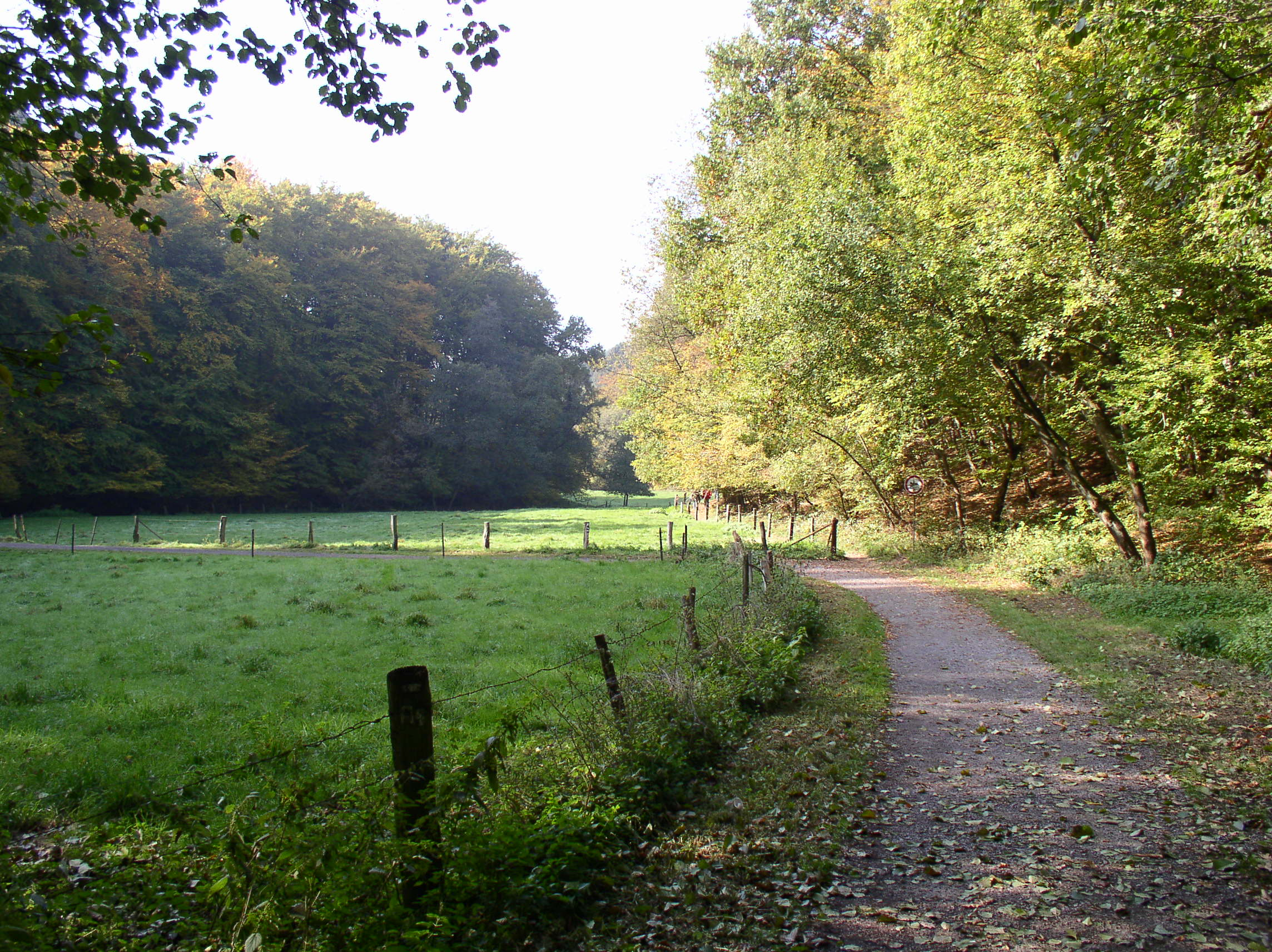

Location
- Country: Germany
- State: North Rhine-Westphalia

Physical characteristics
- Mouth
  - location: Wupper
  - coordinates: 51.0981°N 7.0139°E

Basin features
- Progression: Wupper→ Rhine→ North Sea

Weltersbach is a river of North Rhine-Westphalia, Germany. It is 8.4 km (5.2 mi) long and flows as a left tributary into the Wupper in Leichlingen.

== See also ==
- List of rivers of North Rhine-Westphalia
