= Hatzenbeck =

River in Germany

Location
- Country: Germany
- State: North Rhine-Westphalia

Physical characteristics
- Source
  - coordinates: 51°14′0″N 7°8′47″E
  - elevation: 285 metres (935 ft)
- Mouth
  - coordinates: 51°15′11″N 7°8′13″E
  - elevation: 142 metres (466 ft)
- Length: 2.4 km (1.5 mi)
- Basin size: 2.32 km^{2} (0.90 sq mi)

Basin features
- Progression: Wupper→ Rhine→ North Sea

The Hatzenbeck is a left tributary of the Wupper River in the municipal division of Elberfeld-West of the North Rhine-Westphalian city of Wuppertal.

== Location and topography ==
The Hatzenbeck rises to 285 metres (935 ft) above sea level. It flows northwest to Ravensberger Road and goes downhill to the University of Wuppertal to the northeast. It passes under the Wuppertal-Steinbeck station to the Wupper at a height of 141 metres (463 ft) above sea level. In earlier times the lower reaches had the name Steinbeck.
