= Auer Bach =

River in Germany

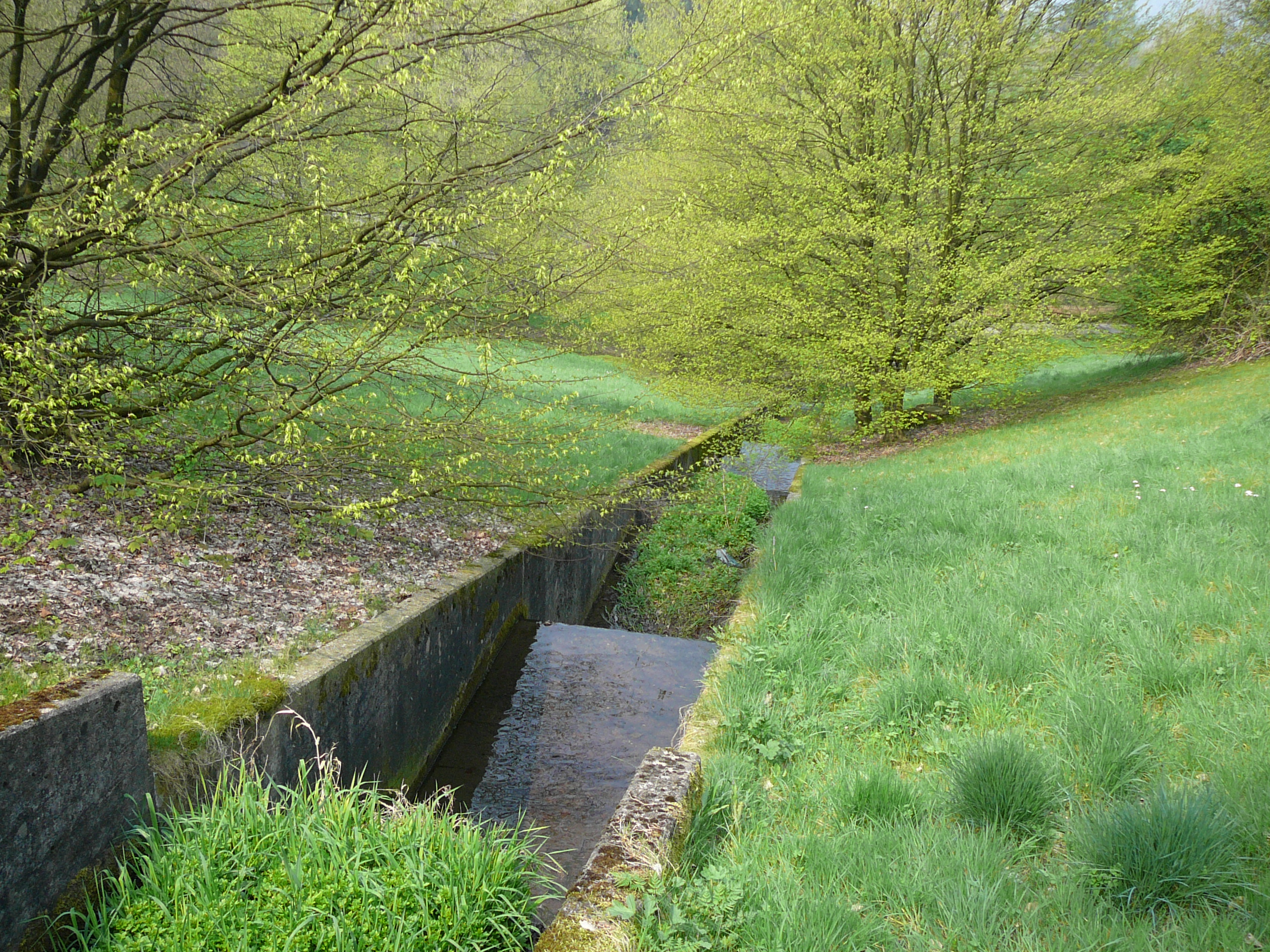

Location
- Country: Germany
- State: North Rhine-Westphalia

Physical characteristics
- Mouth
  - location: Wupper
  - coordinates: 51.2619°N 7.1725°E
- Length: 2.064 km (1.283 mi)

Basin features
- Progression: Wupper→ Rhine→ North Sea

Auer Bach (German pronunciation: [ˈaʊɐ ˈbax]) is a small river of North Rhine-Westphalia, Germany. It flows into the Wupper in Wuppertal.

== See also ==
- List of rivers of North Rhine-Westphalia
