= Herbringhauser Bach =

River in Germany

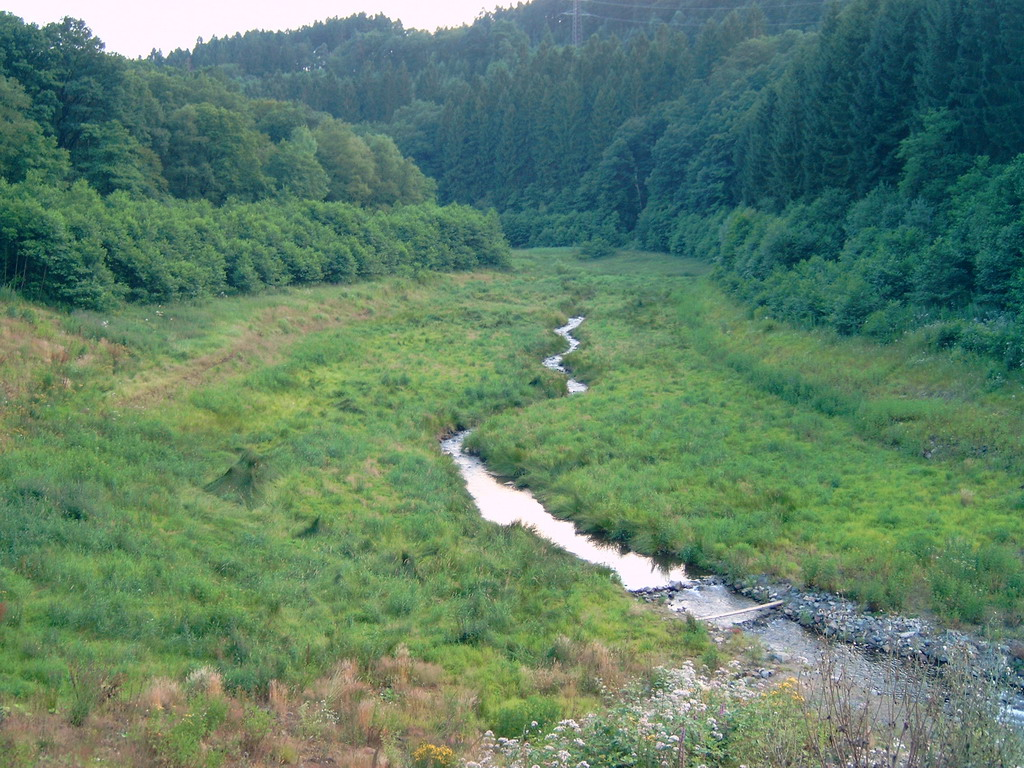

Location
- Country: Germany
- States: North Rhine-Westphalia

Physical characteristics
- Mouth
  - location: Wupper
  - coordinates: 51.2534°N 7.2708°E

Basin features
- Progression: Wupper→ Rhine→ North Sea

Herbringhauser Bach is a small river of North Rhine-Westphalia, Germany. It flows into the Wupper near Beyenburg. It is roughly 7 km long, and its valley is protected as a nature reserve, Herbringhauser Bachtal. This provides an important habitat to wildlife, and helps with carbon sequestration.

== See also ==
- List of rivers of North Rhine-Westphalia
