= Spreeler Bach =

River in Germany

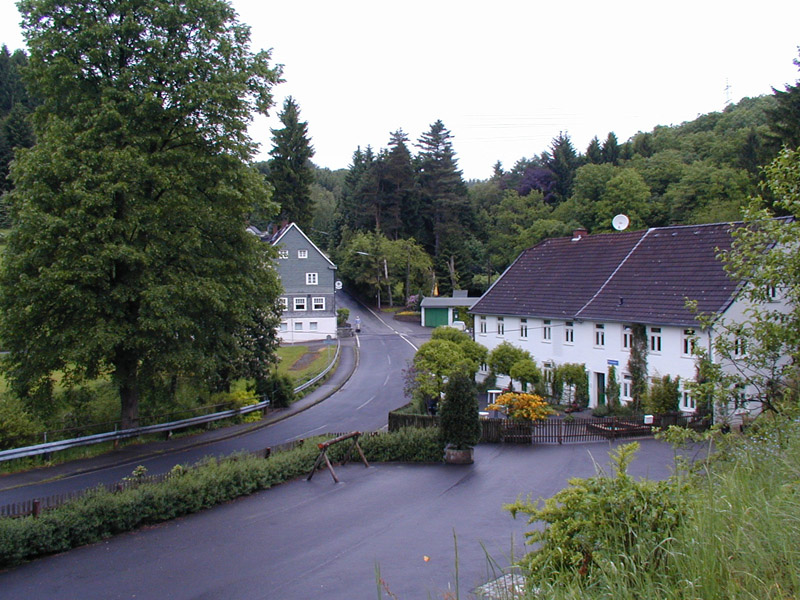

Location
- Country: Germany
- State: North Rhine-Westphalia

Physical characteristics
- Mouth
  - location: Wupper
  - coordinates: 51.2397°N 7.3067°E

Basin features
- Progression: Wupper→ Rhine→ North Sea
- Tributaries
  - left: Brebach, Pastoratshofer Bach

Spreeler Bach is a small river of North Rhine-Westphalia, Germany. It is 4.1 km (2.5 mi) long and flows as a right tributary into the Wupper near Radevormwald.

== See also ==
- List of rivers of North Rhine-Westphalia
