= Hönnige (Wupper) =

River in Germany

Location
- Country: Germany
- States: North Rhine-Westphalia

Physical characteristics
- Mouth
  - location: Wupper
  - coordinates: 51.1220°N 7.4083°E

Basin features
- Progression: Wupper→ Rhine→ North Sea

Hönnige is a river of North Rhine-Westphalia, Germany. It is 9.1 km long and a right tributary of the Wupper in Wipperfürth.

== See also ==
- List of rivers of North Rhine-Westphalia
