= Kaltenbach (Wupper) =

River in Germany

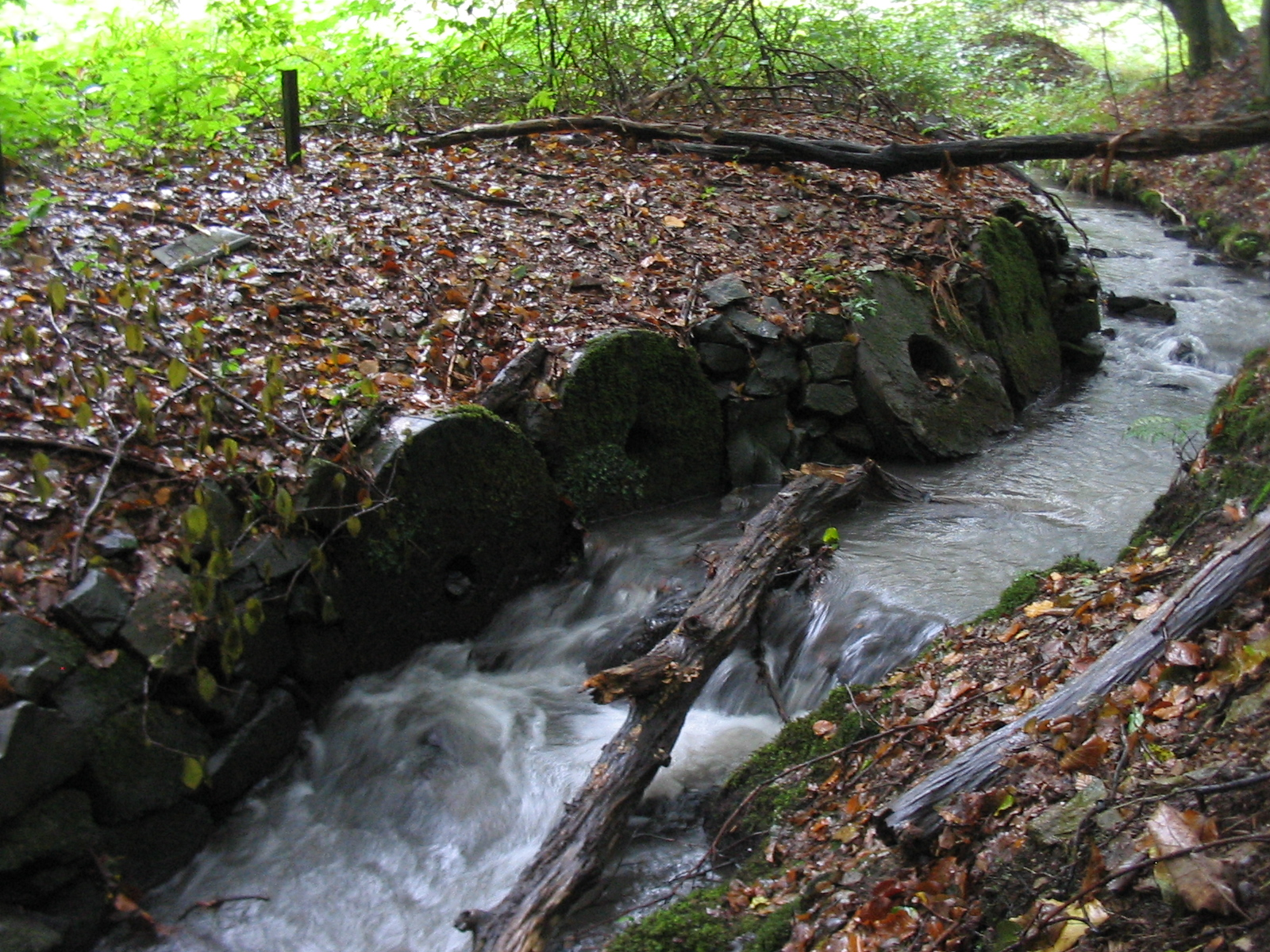

Location
- Country: Germany
- States: North Rhine-Westphalia

Physical characteristics
- Mouth
  - location: Wupper
  - coordinates: 51.1890°N 7.1124°E

Basin features
- Progression: Wupper→ Rhine→ North Sea

Kaltenbach is a small river of North Rhine-Westphalia, Germany. It is 2.2 km long and flows into the Wupper at a left tributary near Solingen.

It is one of four rivers and streams in North Rhine-Westphalia named Kaltenbach.

== See also ==
- List of rivers of North Rhine-Westphalia
