= Marscheider Bach =

River in Germany

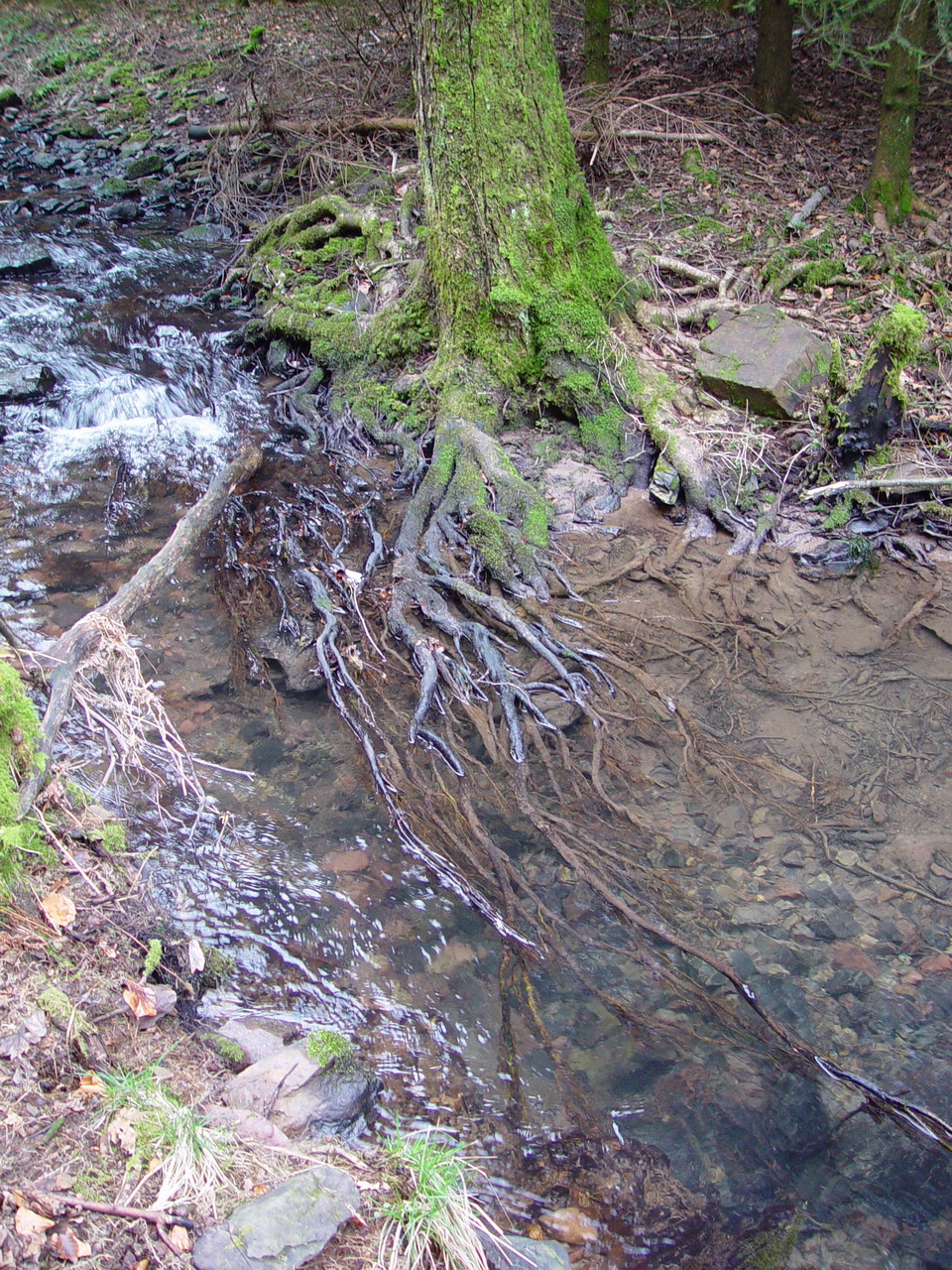

Location
- Country: Germany
- State: North Rhine-Westphalia

Physical characteristics
- Mouth
  - location: Wupper
  - coordinates: 51.2544°N 7.2542°E
- Length: 6.1 km (3.8 mi)

Basin features
- Progression: Wupper→ Rhine→ North Sea

Marscheider Bach is a river of North Rhine-Westphalia, Germany. It flows into the Wupper near Wuppertal.

== See also ==
- List of rivers of North Rhine-Westphalia
