= Wilhelmstaler Bach =

River in Germany

Location
- Country: Germany
- State: North Rhine-Westphalia

Physical characteristics
- Mouth
  - location: Wupper
  - coordinates: 51.2069°N 7.3039°E

Basin features
- Progression: Wupper→ Rhine→ North Sea

Wilhelmstaler Bach is a small river of North Rhine-Westphalia, Germany. It is 2.3 km (1.4 mi) long and is a left tributary of the Wupper near Radevormwald.

== See also ==
- List of rivers of North Rhine-Westphalia
