= Kerspe =

River in Germany

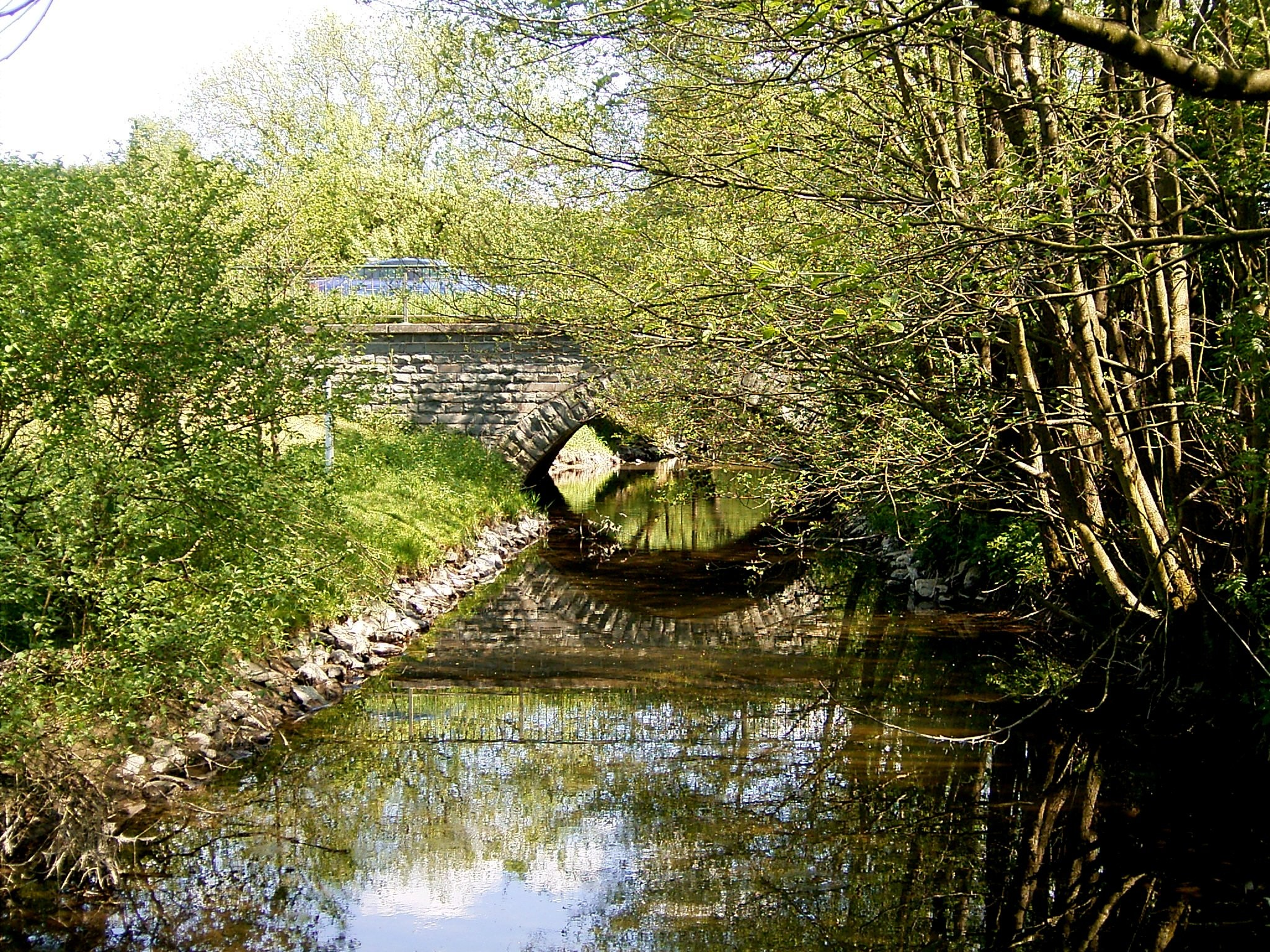

Location
- Country: Germany
- State: North Rhine-Westphalia

Physical characteristics
- Mouth
  - location: Wupper
  - coordinates: 51.1139°N 7.4823°E
- Length: 12.5 km (7.8 mi)

Basin features
- Progression: Wupper→ Rhine→ North Sea

Kerspe is a river of North Rhine-Westphalia, Germany. It flows into the Wupper near Wipperfürth-Ohl.

== See also ==
- List of rivers of North Rhine-Westphalia
