= Remlingrader Bach =

River in Germany

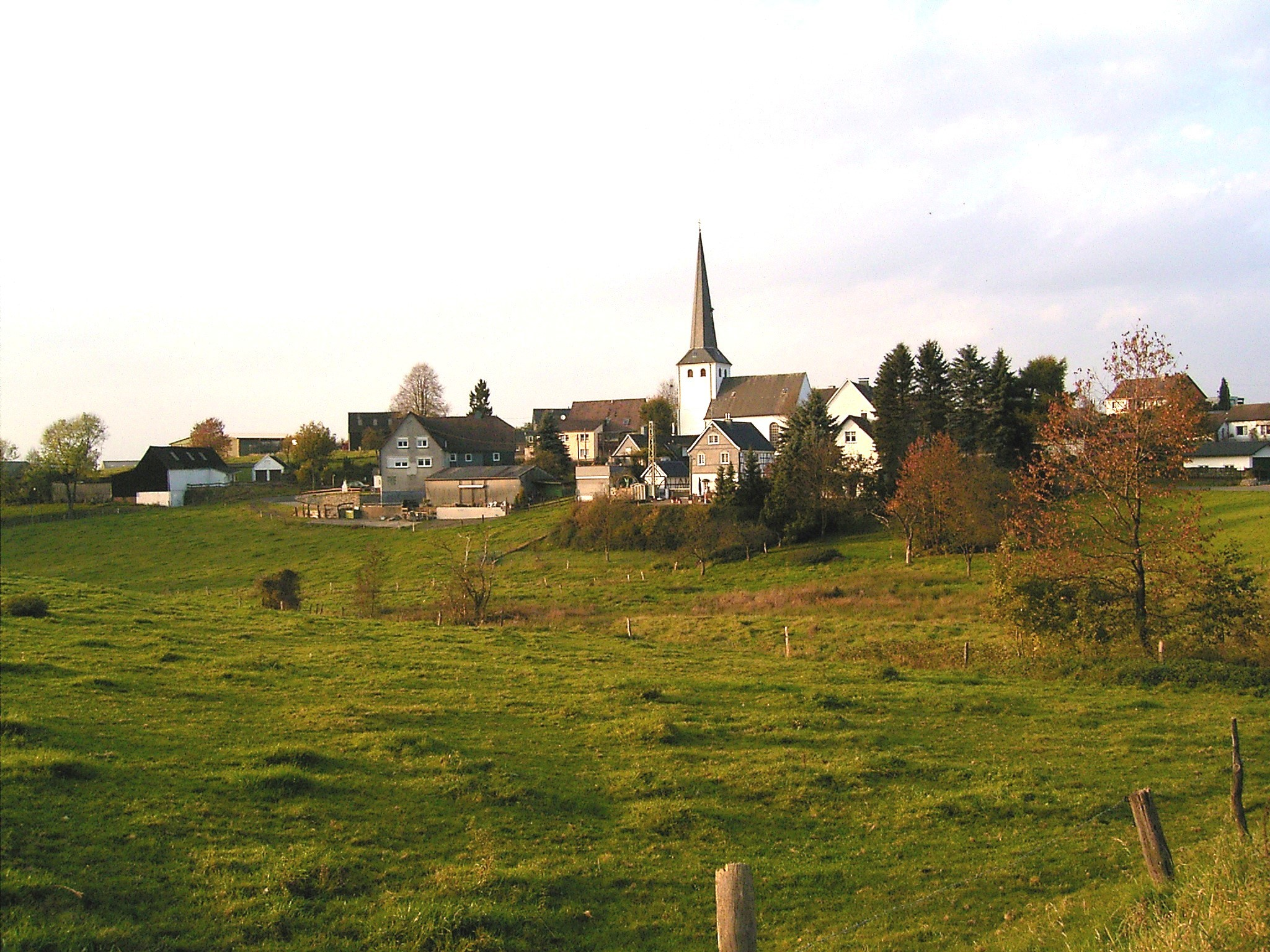

Location
- Country: Germany
- States: North Rhine-Westphalia

Physical characteristics
- Mouth
  - location: Wupper
  - coordinates: 51.2367°N 7.3109°E

Basin features
- Progression: Wupper→ Rhine→ North Sea

Remlingrader Bach is a small river of North Rhine-Westphalia, Germany. It is 2.9 km (1.8 mi) long and flows as a right tributary into the Wupper near Radevormwald.

== See also ==
- List of rivers of North Rhine-Westphalia
