= Murmelbach (Wupper) =

River in Germany

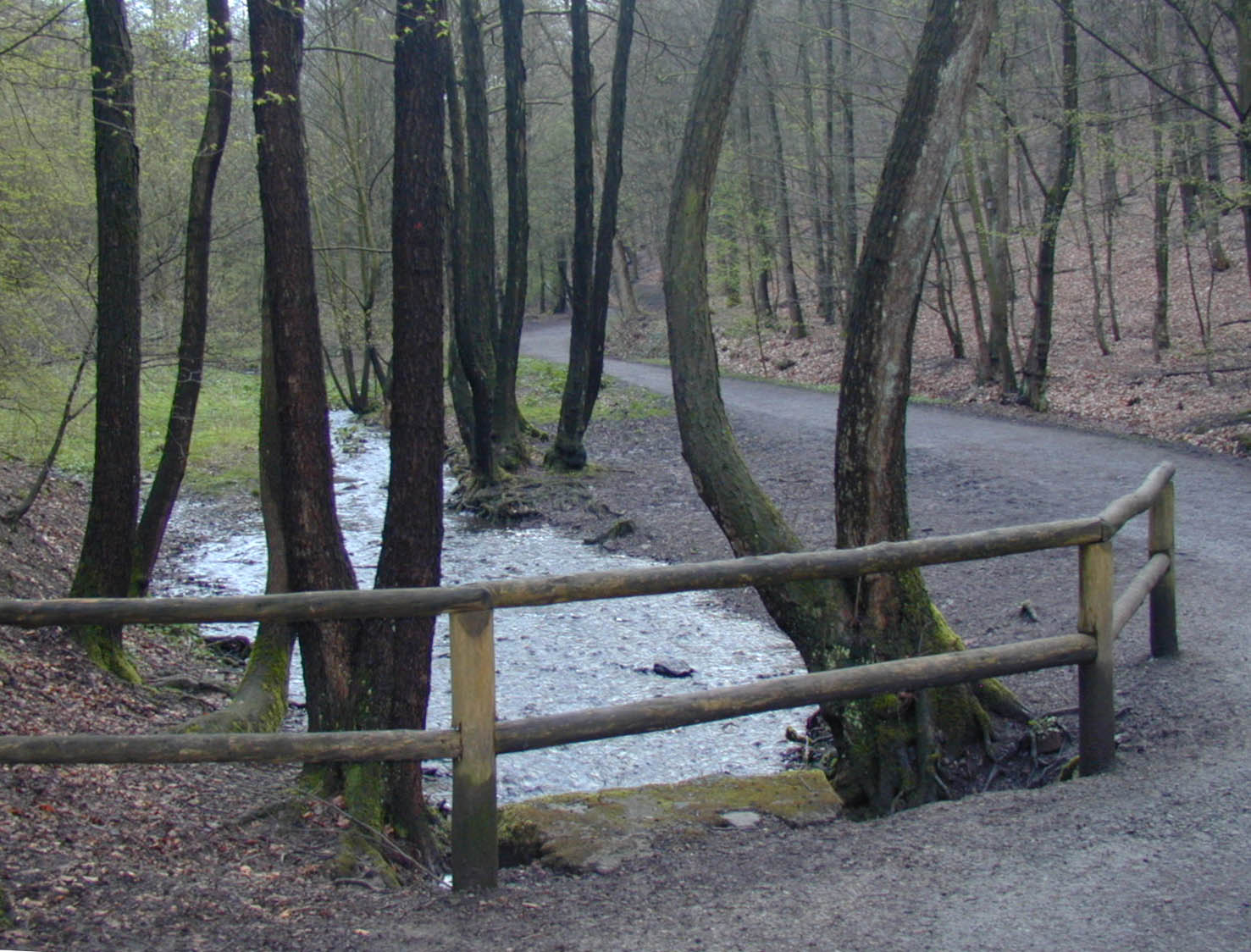

Location
- Country: Germany
- State: North Rhine-Westphalia

Physical characteristics
- Mouth
  - location: Wupper
  - coordinates: 51.2708°N 7.2311°E
- Length: 3.6 km (2.2 mi)

Basin features
- Progression: Wupper→ Rhine→ North Sea

Murmelbach is a small river of North Rhine-Westphalia, Germany. It flows into the Wupper in Wuppertal.

== See also ==
- List of rivers of North Rhine-Westphalia
