= Wiembach =

River in Germany

Location
- Country: Germany
- State: North Rhine-Westphalia

Physical characteristics
- Mouth
  - location: Wupper
  - coordinates: 51.0738°N 6.9999°E
- Length: 10.5 km (6.5 mi)

Basin features
- Progression: Wupper→ Rhine→ North Sea

Wiembach is a river of North Rhine-Westphalia, Germany. It flows into the Wupper near Opladen.

== See also ==
- List of rivers of North Rhine-Westphalia
