= Briller Bach =

River in Germany

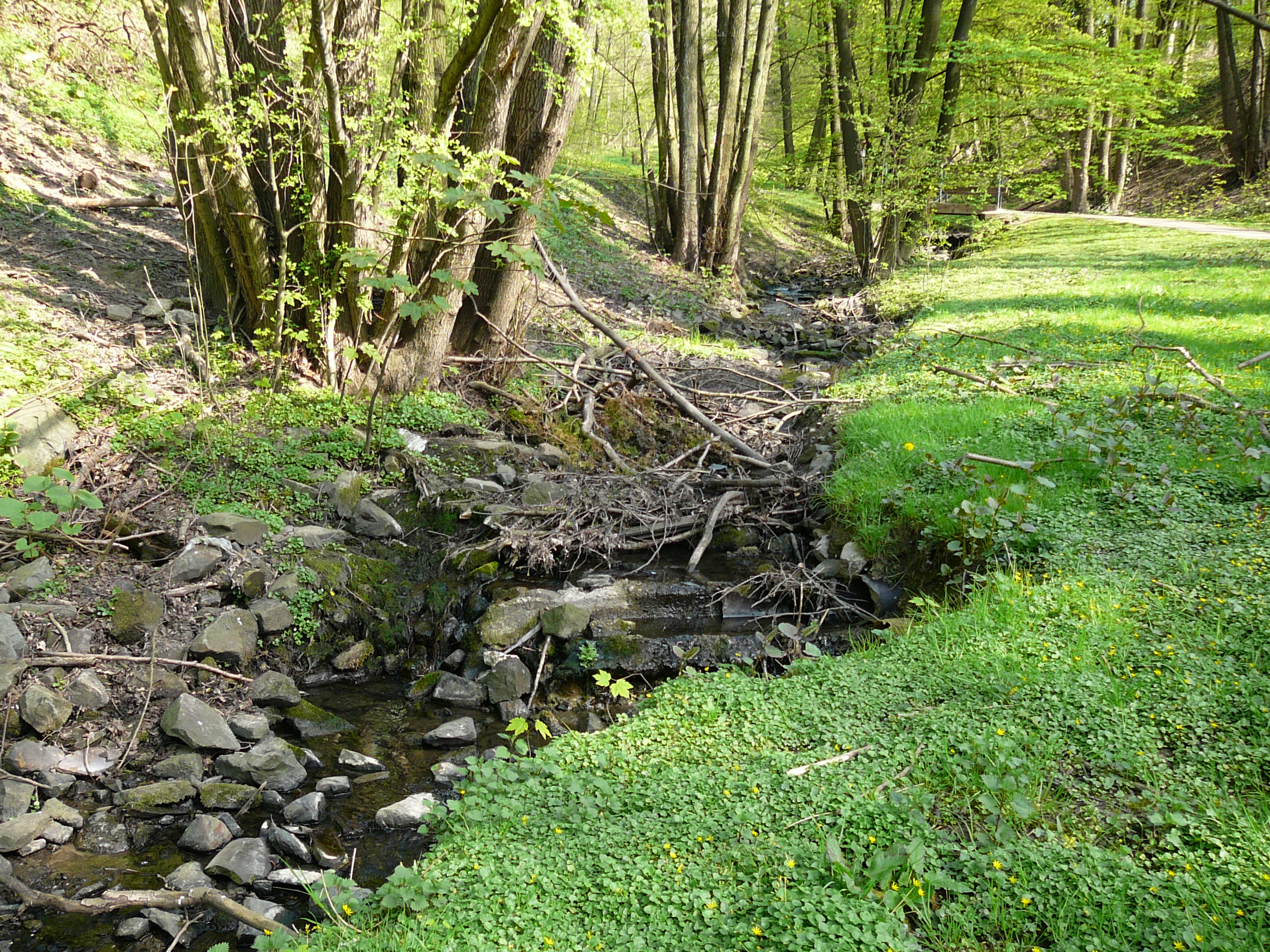

Location
- Country: Germany
- State: North Rhine-Westphalia

Physical characteristics
- Mouth
  - location: Wupper
  - coordinates: 51.2524°N 7.1340°E

Basin features
- Progression: Wupper→ Rhine→ North Sea

Briller Bach is a small river of North Rhine-Westphalia, Germany. It is 3.5 km long and flows into the Wupper in Wuppertal.

== See also ==
- List of rivers of North Rhine-Westphalia
