= Murbach (Wupper) =

River in Germany

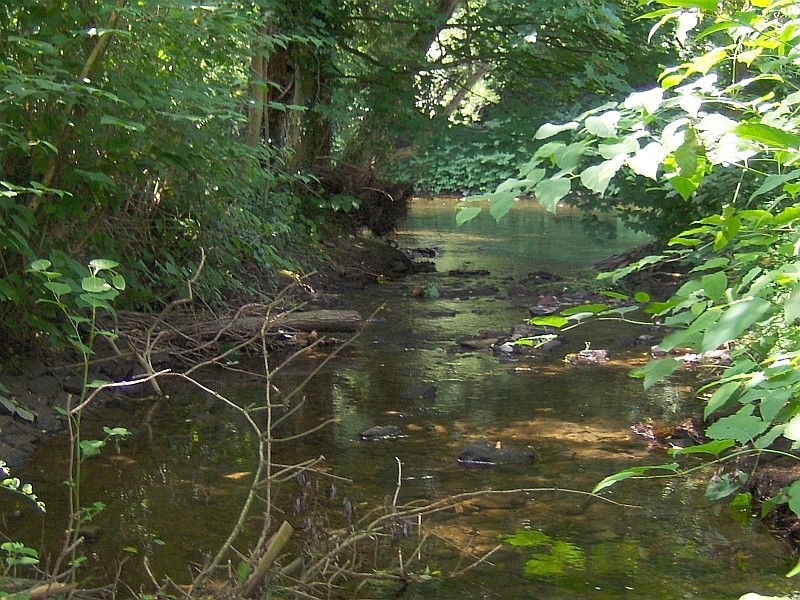

Location
- Country: Germany
- State: North Rhine-Westphalia

Physical characteristics
- Source
  - coordinates: 51°06′14″N 7°08′40″E
- Mouth
  - location: Wupper
  - coordinates: 51.0899°N 7.0214°E
- Length: 11.1 km (6.9 mi)

Basin features
- Progression: Wupper→ Rhine→ North Sea

Murbach is a river of North Rhine-Westphalia, Germany. It is a left tributary of the Wupper near Leichlingen.

== See also ==
- List of rivers of North Rhine-Westphalia
