= Sengbach =

River in Germany

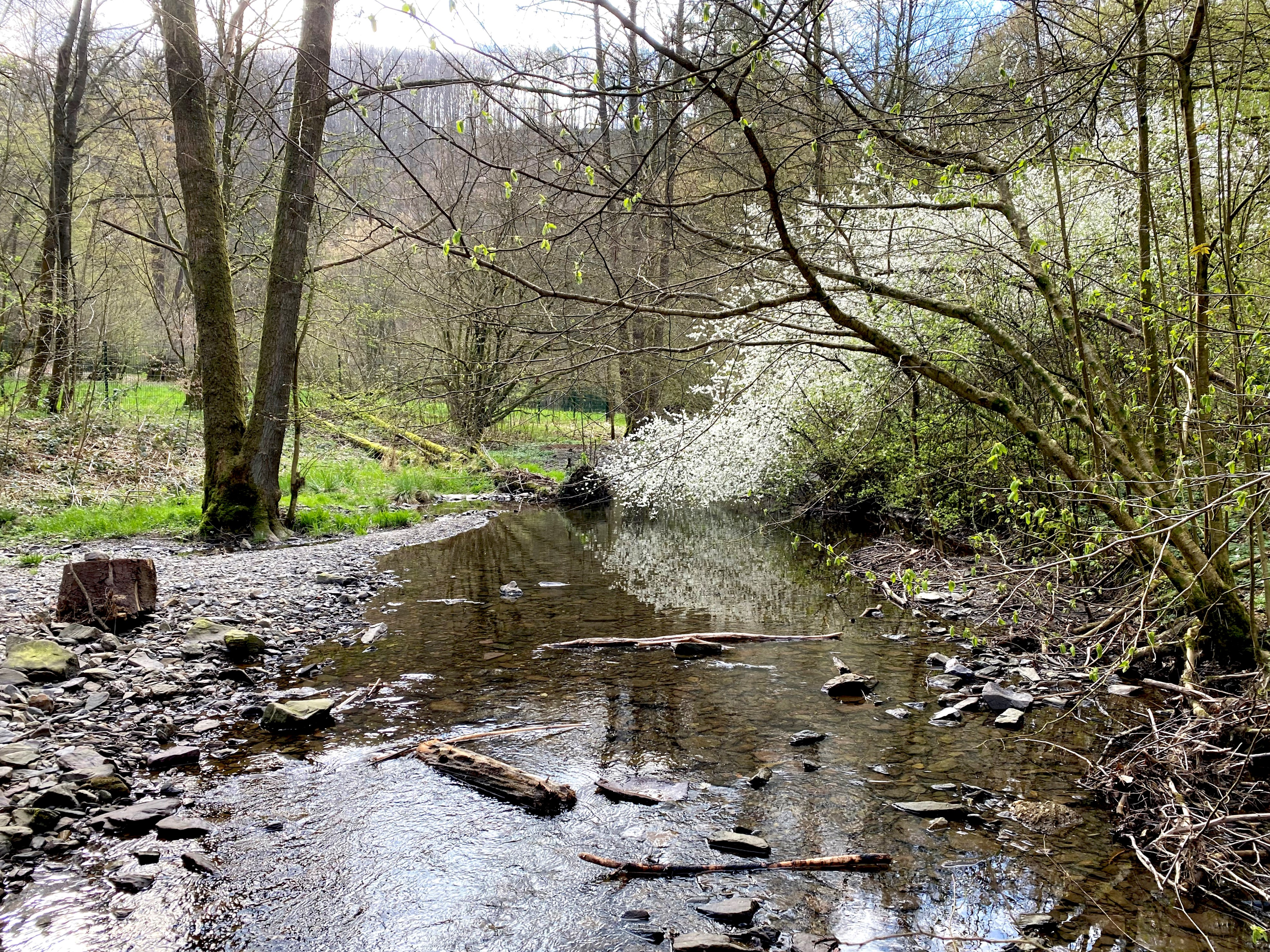

Location
- Country: Germany
- State: North Rhine-Westphalia

Physical characteristics
- Mouth
  - location: Wupper
  - coordinates: 51.1333°N 7.1197°E

Basin features
- Progression: Wupper→ Rhine→ North Sea

Sengbach is a river of North Rhine-Westphalia, Germany. It is 7.4 km (4.6 mi) long and flows as a left tributary into the Wupper near Solingen.

== See also ==
- List of rivers of North Rhine-Westphalia
