= Brebach (Spreeler Bach) =

River in Germany

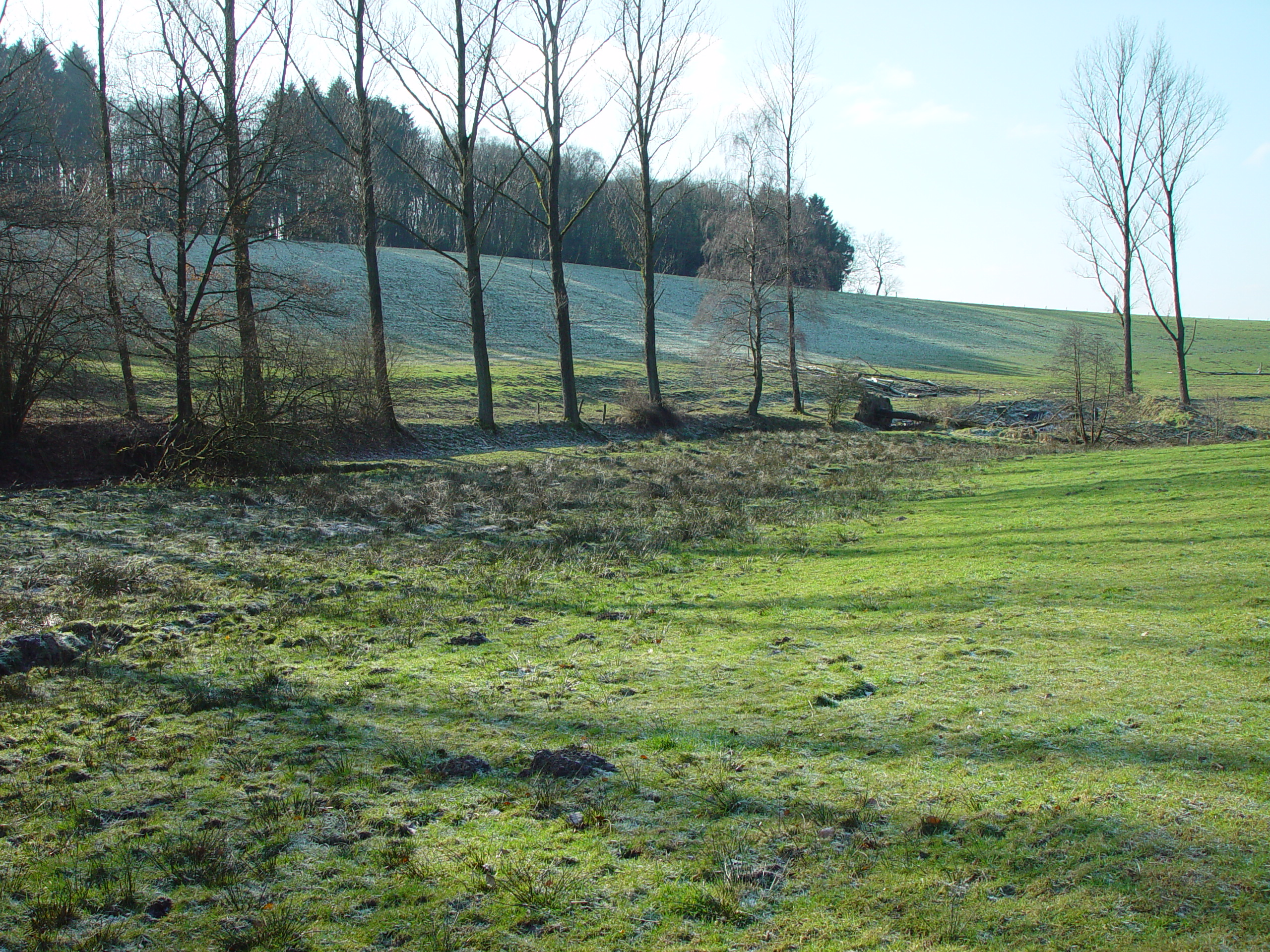

Location
- Country: Germany
- State: North Rhine-Westphalia

Physical characteristics
- Mouth
  - location: Spreeler Bach
  - coordinates: 51.2498°N 7.3272°E

Basin features
- Progression: Spreeler Bach→ Wupper→ Rhine→ North Sea

The Brebach is a river of North Rhine-Westphalia, Germany. It is 3.5 km long and is a left tributary of the Spreeler Bach.

== See also ==
- List of rivers of North Rhine-Westphalia
