= Uelfe =

River in Germany

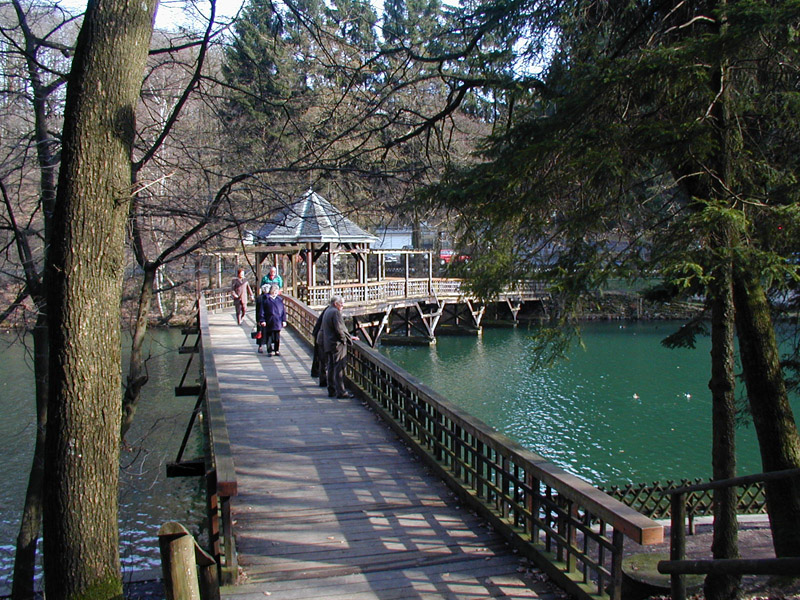
- Bridge over the Uelfe

Location
- Country: Germany
- State: North Rhine-Westphalia

Physical characteristics
- Mouth
  - location: Wupper
  - coordinates: 51.2150°N 7.3092°E

Basin features
- Progression: Wupper→ Rhine→ North Sea
- Tributaries
  - right: Eistringhauser Bach

The Uelfe is a small river of North Rhine-Westphalia, Germany. It is 7.9 km (4.9 mi) long and flows as a right tributary into the Wupper near Radevormwald.

== See also ==
- List of rivers of North Rhine-Westphalia
