= Gaulbach =

River in Germany

Location
- Country: Germany
- States: North Rhine-Westphalia

Physical characteristics
- Mouth
  - location: Wupper
  - coordinates: 51.1195°N 7.3983°E

Basin features
- Progression: Wupper→ Rhine→ North Sea

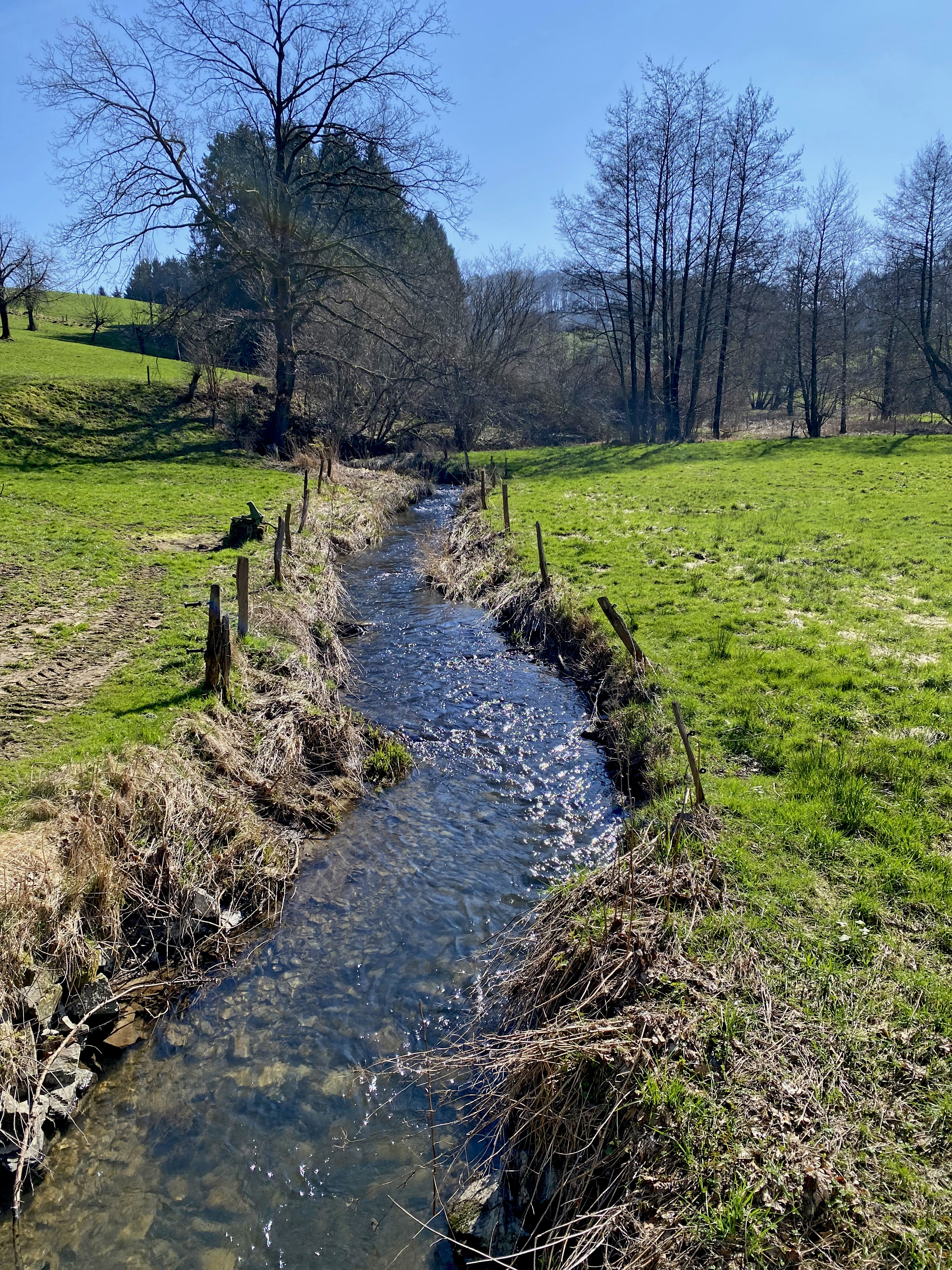
Gaulbach near Niedergaul.

Gaulbach is a river of North Rhine-Westphalia, Germany. It flows into the Wupper in Wipperfürth.

== See also ==
- List of rivers of North Rhine-Westphalia
