= Neye (Wupper) =

Location
- Country: Germany
- State: North Rhine-Westphalia

Physical characteristics
- Mouth
  - location: Wupper
  - coordinates: 51.1227°N 7.3805°E
- Length: 9.8 km (6.1 mi)

Basin features
- Progression: Wupper→ Rhine→ North Sea

Neye is a river of North Rhine-Westphalia, Germany. It is a right tributary of the Wupper near Wipperfürth.

== See also ==
- List of rivers of North Rhine-Westphalia
