= Wiebach =

River in Germany

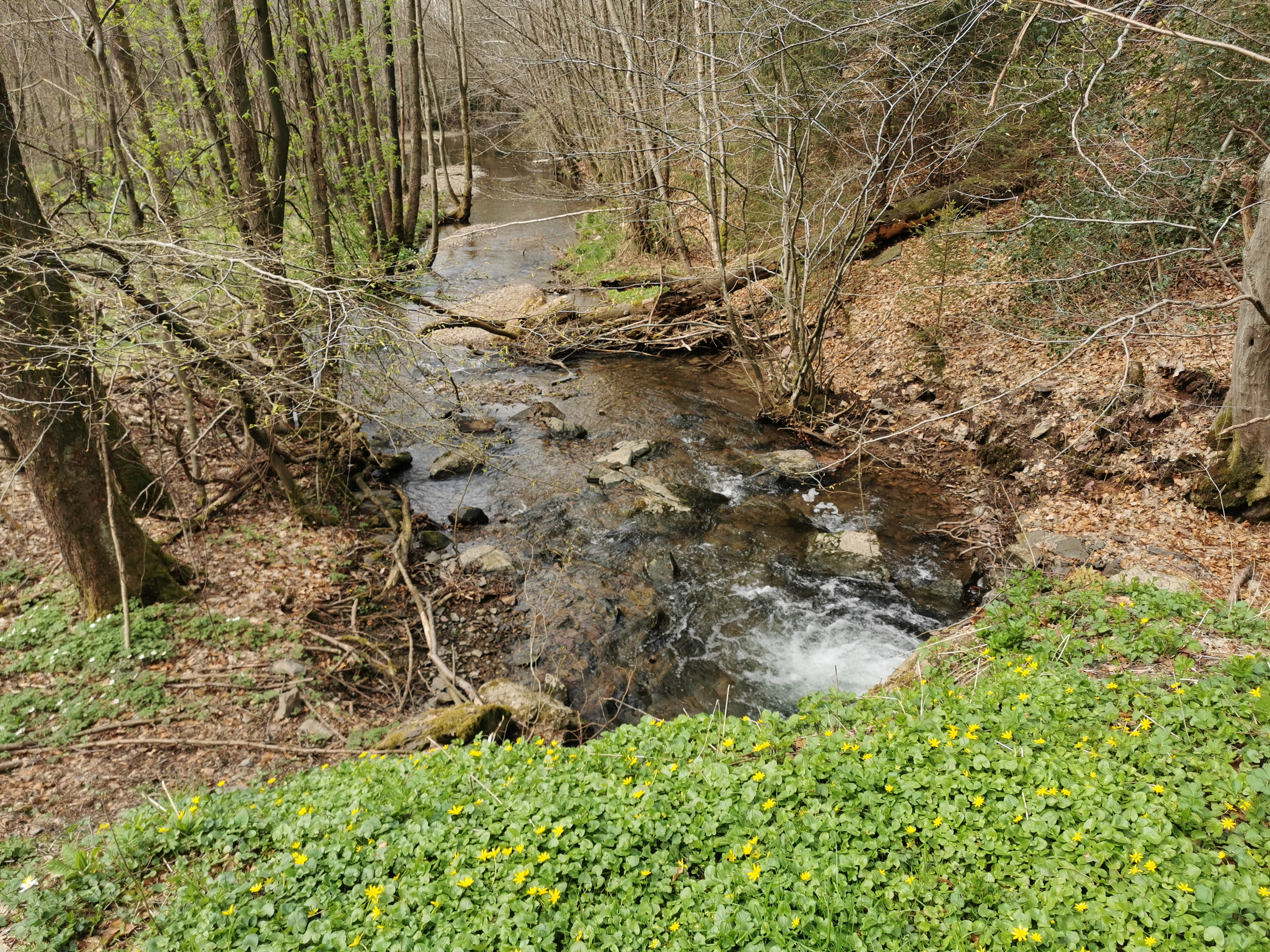
- Wiebach in summer, right before its confluence with the Wiebach pre-dam of the Wuppertal Dam

Location
- Country: Germany
- State: North Rhine-Westphalia

Physical characteristics
- Mouth
  - location: Wupper
  - coordinates: 51.1804°N 7.3308°E

Basin features
- Progression: Wupper→ Rhine→ North Sea

Wiebach is a small river of North Rhine-Westphalia, Germany. It is 4.1 km (2.5 mi) long and flows into the Wupper as a right tributary near Radevormwald.

== See also ==
- List of rivers of North Rhine-Westphalia
