= Bendahler Bach =

River in Germany

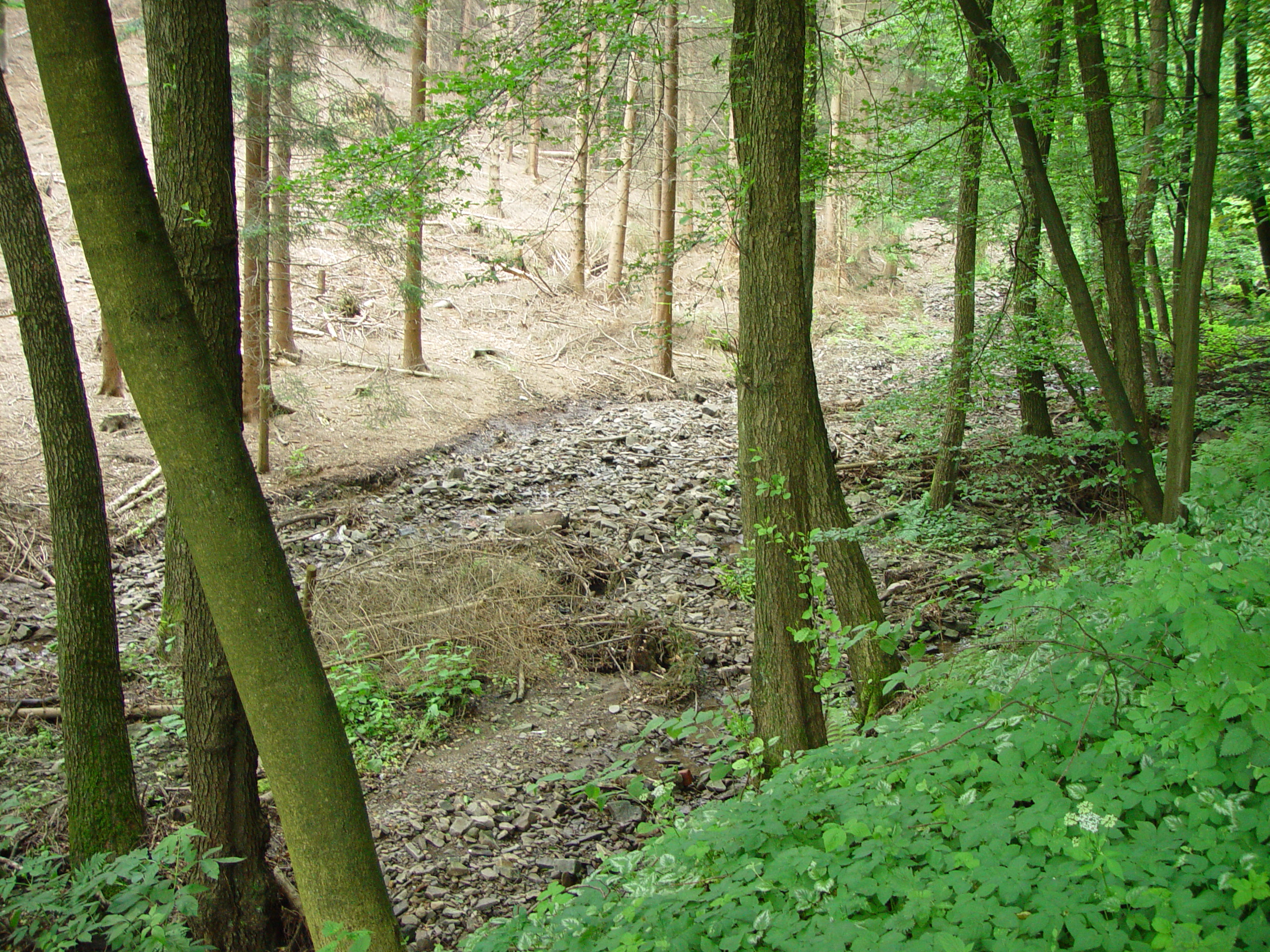

Location
- Country: Germany
- State: North Rhine-Westphalia

Physical characteristics
- Mouth
  - location: Wupper
  - coordinates: 51.2578°N 7.1633°E

Basin features
- Progression: Wupper→ Rhine→ North Sea

Bendahler Bach is a small river of North Rhine-Westphalia, Germany. It flows into the Wupper in Wuppertal.

== See also ==
- List of rivers of North Rhine-Westphalia
