= Varresbeck =

Small river of North Rhine-Westphalia, Germany

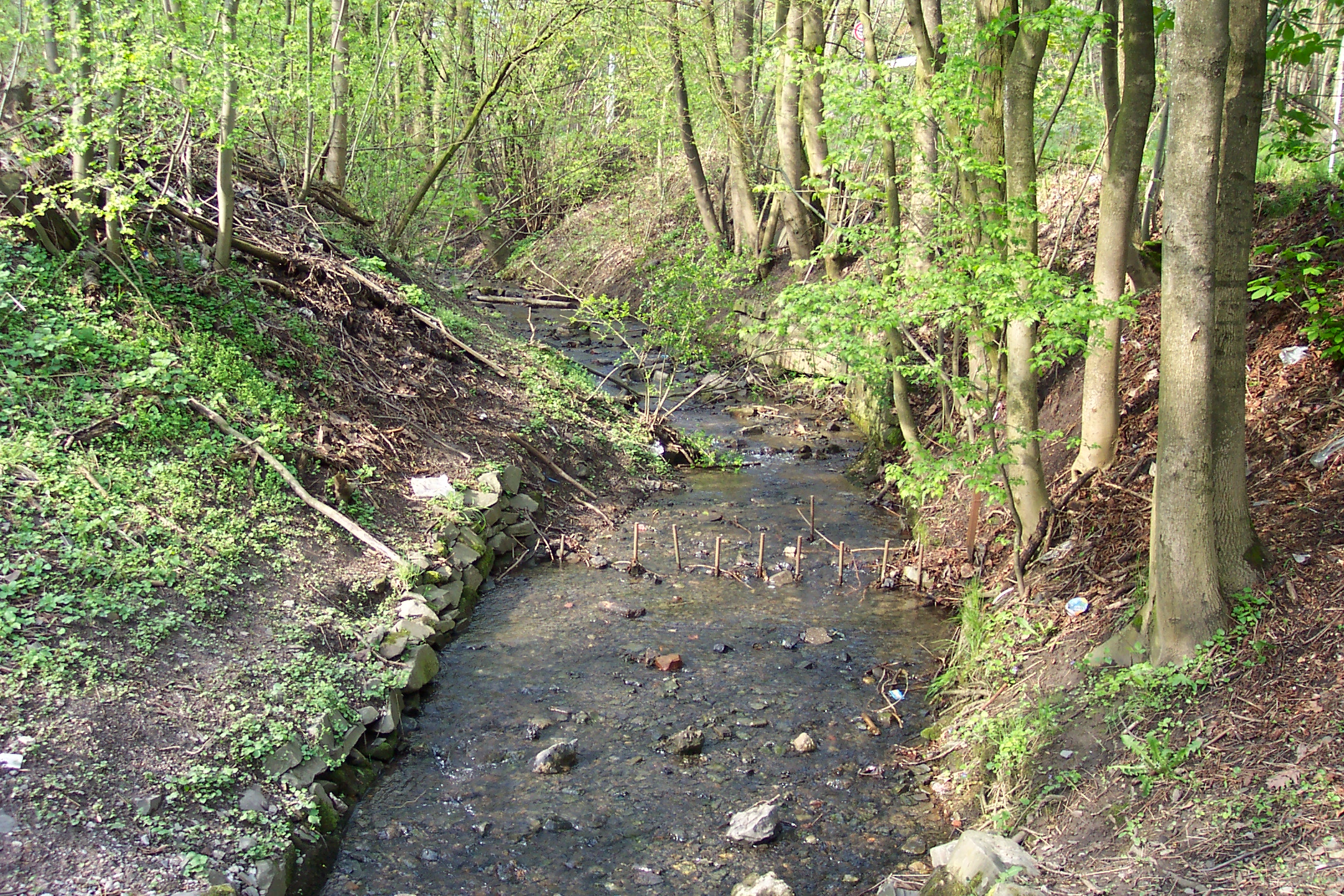

Location
- Country: Germany
- State: North Rhine-Westphalia

Physical characteristics
- Mouth
  - location: Wupper
  - coordinates: 51.2456°N 7.1061°E

Basin features
- Progression: Wupper→ Rhine→ North Sea

Varresbeck is a small river of North Rhine-Westphalia, Germany. It is 3.2 km (2.0 mi) long and flows as a right tributary into the Wupper in Wuppertal.

== See also ==
- List of rivers of North Rhine-Westphalia
