= Hengstener Bach =

River in Germany

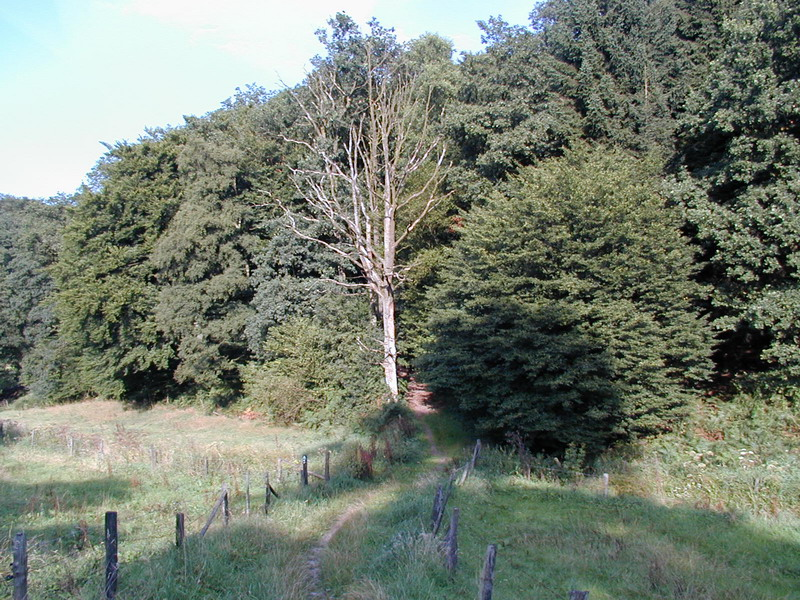

Location
- Country: Germany
- States: North Rhine-Westphalia

Physical characteristics
- Mouth
  - location: Wupper
  - coordinates: 51.2445°N 7.2996°E

Basin features
- Progression: Wupper→ Rhine→ North Sea

Hengstener Bach is a small river of North Rhine-Westphalia, Germany. It is 2.9 km long and flows into the Wupper near Beyenburg.

== See also ==
- List of rivers of North Rhine-Westphalia
