= Schwarzbach (Wupper) =

River in Germany

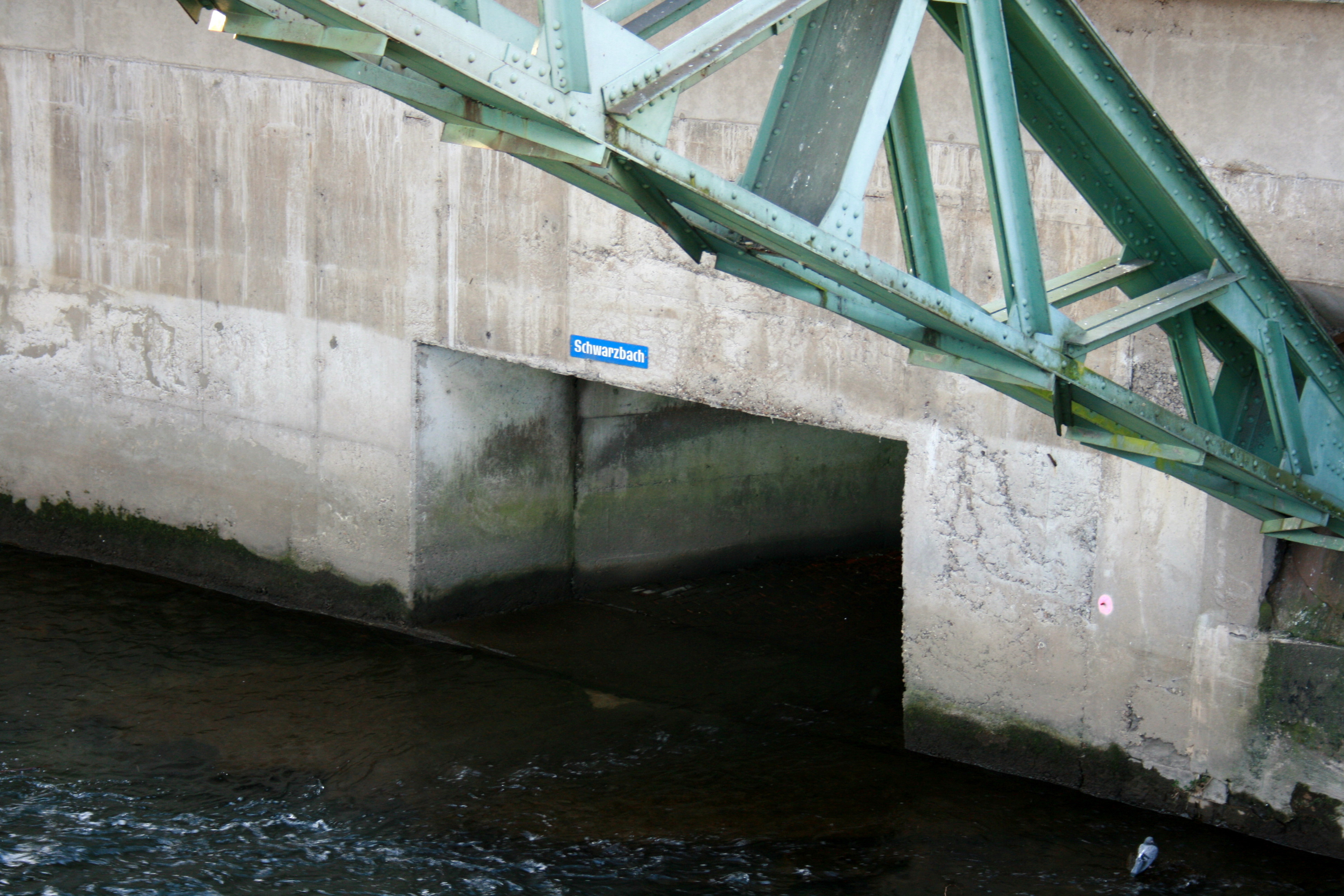

Location
- Country: Germany
- States: North Rhine-Westphalia

Physical characteristics
- Mouth
  - location: Wupper
  - coordinates: 51.2748°N 7.2220°E

Basin features
- Progression: Wupper→ Rhine→ North Sea

Schwarzbach (German pronunciation: [ˈʃvaʁtsˌbax]) is a small river of North Rhine-Westphalia, Germany. It is 4 km (2.5 mi) long and is a right tributary of the Wupper in Wuppertal. It is one of 14 rivers and streams in North Rhine-Westphalia listed officially under the name Schwarzbach.

== See also ==
- List of rivers of North Rhine-Westphalia
