= Blombach =

River in Germany

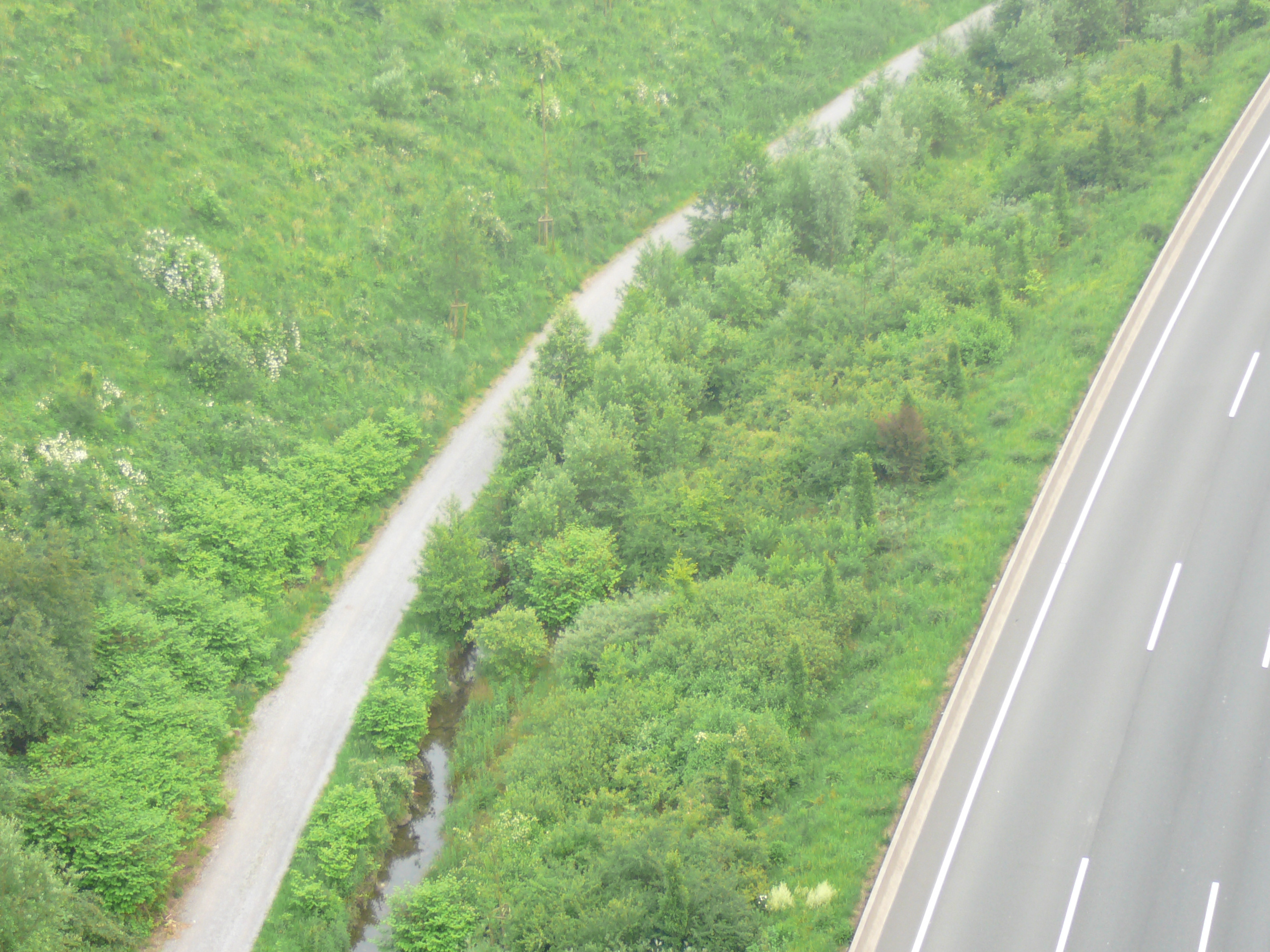

Location
- Country: Germany
- State: North Rhine-Westphalia

Physical characteristics
- Mouth
  - location: Wupper
  - coordinates: 51.2561°N 7.2322°E

Basin features
- Progression: Wupper→ Rhine→ North Sea

Blombach is a small river of North Rhine-Westphalia, Germany. It is 3.6 km long and flows into the Wupper near Wuppertal.

== See also ==
- List of rivers of North Rhine-Westphalia
