= Brunsbach (Wupper) =

River of North Rhine-Westphalia, Germany

Location
- Country: Germany
- State: North Rhine-Westphalia

Physical characteristics
- Mouth
  - location: Wupper
  - coordinates: 51.1520°N 7.3442°E

Basin features
- Progression: Wupper→ Rhine→ North Sea
- Tributaries
  - right: Weierbach

Brunsbach is a small river of North Rhine-Westphalia, Germany. It is a left tributary of the Wupper in Hückeswagen. The Weierbach river is a tributary of the Brunsbach.

== See also ==
- List of rivers of North Rhine-Westphalia
