= Eschbach (Wupper) =

River in Germany

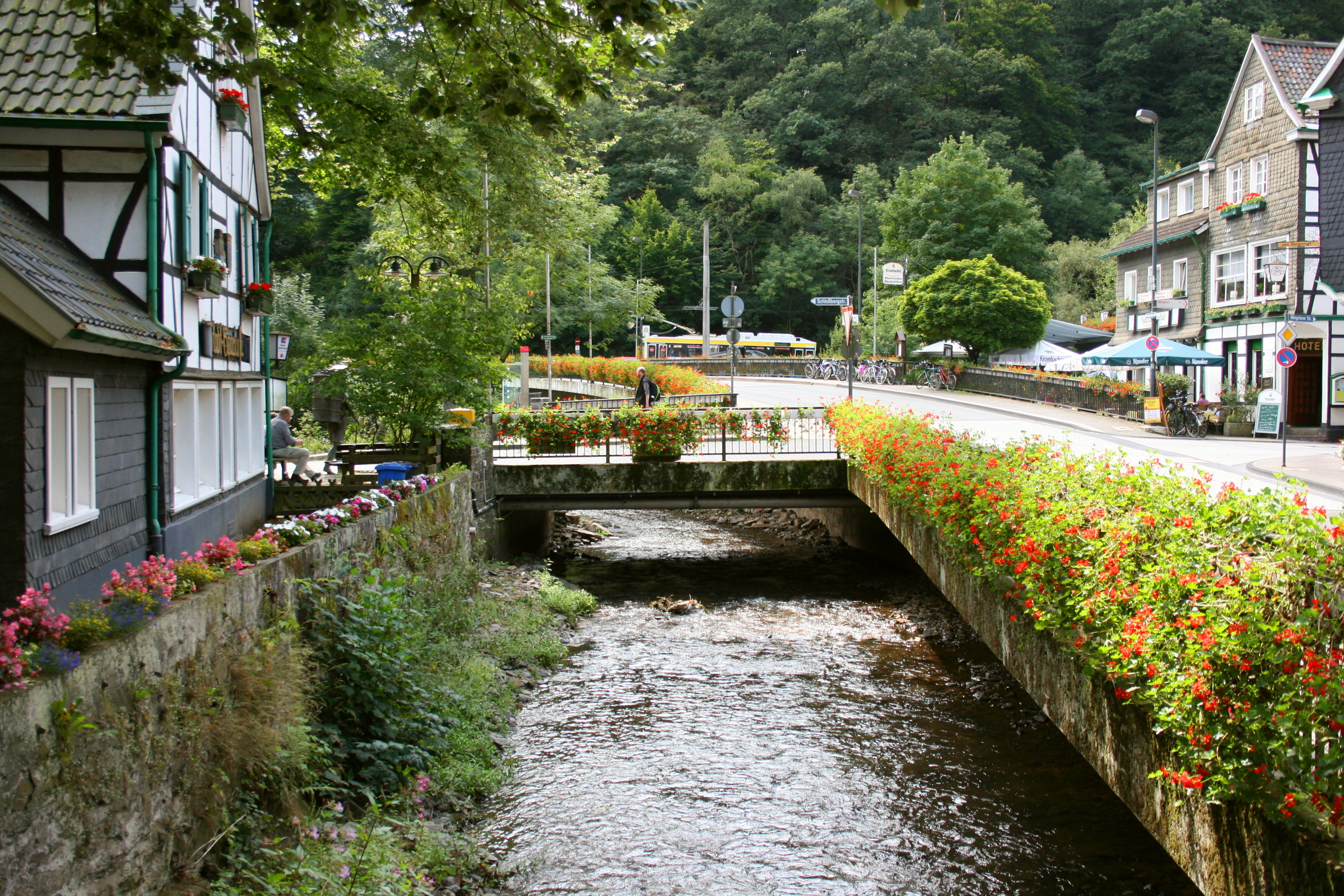

Location
- Country: Germany
- State: North Rhine-Westphalia

Physical characteristics
- Mouth
  - location: Wupper
  - coordinates: 51.1375°N 7.1478°E
- Length: 12.0 km (7.5 mi)

Basin features
- Progression: Wupper→ Rhine→ North Sea

Eschbach (German pronunciation: [ˈɛʃbax]) is a river of North Rhine-Westphalia, Germany. It flows into the Wupper in Burg an der Wupper.

== See also ==
- List of rivers of North Rhine-Westphalia
