= Wupper =

River in Germany

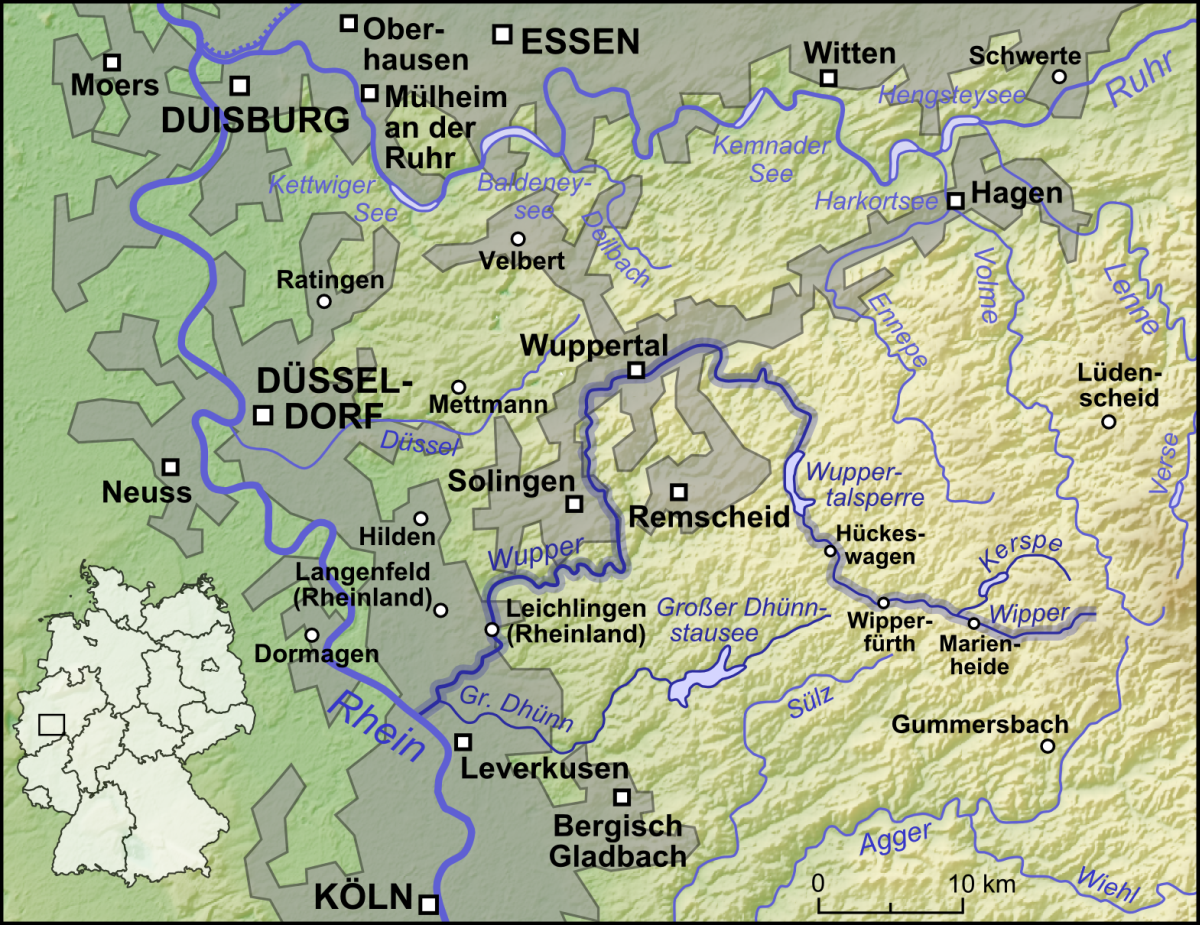
- Wupper

Location
- Country: Germany
- State: North Rhine-Westphalia

Physical characteristics
- Source
  - location: Sauerland
  - elevation: 441 m (1,447 ft)
- Mouth
  - location: Rhine
  - coordinates: 51°02′43″N 6°56′27″E
- Length: 115.8 km (72.0 mi)
- Basin size: 813 km^{2} (314 sq mi)
- Discharge
  - average: 17 m^{3}/s (600 cu ft/s)

Basin features
- Progression: Rhine→ North Sea
- Tributaries
  - left: Dhünn

The Wupper (German pronunciation: [ˈvʊpɐ]) is a right tributary of the Rhine in the state of North Rhine-Westphalia, Germany. Rising near Marienheide in western Sauerland it runs through the mountainous region of the Bergisches Land and enters the Rhine at Leverkusen, south of Düsseldorf. Its upper course is called Wipper. Both names are related to "weave", and refer to the river's twisting course.

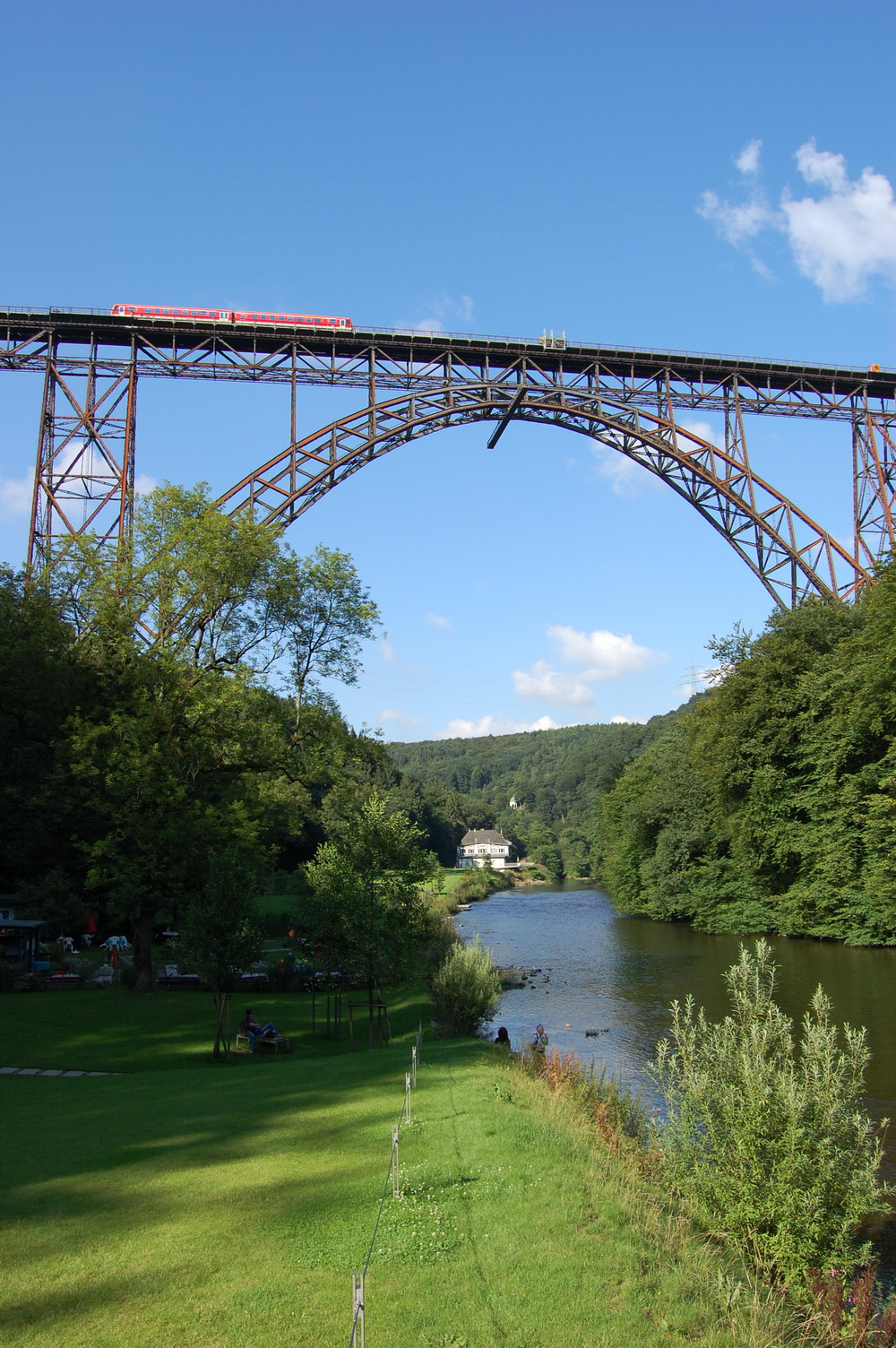
Müngsten Bridge between Remscheid and Solingen.

On its course of about 116 kilometers (72 mi), the Wupper passes through the city of Wuppertal where the suspension railway runs for 10 kilometers (6.2 mi) above the river.

It is crossed by the highest railway bridge in Germany near Müngsten, between Remscheid and Solingen. A few kilometers further down, Burg Castle is located on a hill overlooking the river.

== Hydropower ==
From the 15th century on, the Wupper and its numerous streams gave birth to hundreds of workshops, mills and factories on their banks. Originally water was used for dyeing, bleaching and washing canvas and cloth; later it was used to power machines or transport waste.

The Wupper thus facilitated the early industrial expansion of Wuppertal (German for "Wupper Valley") during the 18th, 19th, and early 20th centuries. The Wupper Valley was one of the world's first industrialized regions and empowered inter alia the Ruhr valley as a coal-mining region.

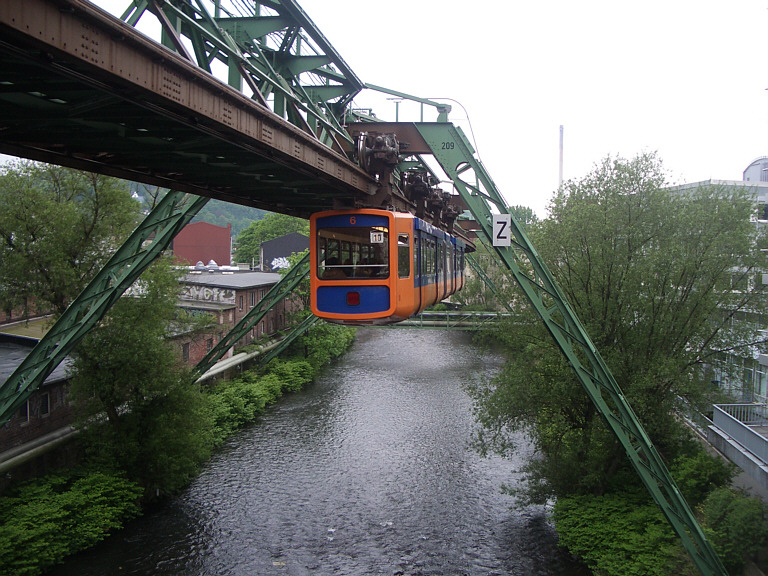
The suspension railway over the Wupper in Wuppertal.

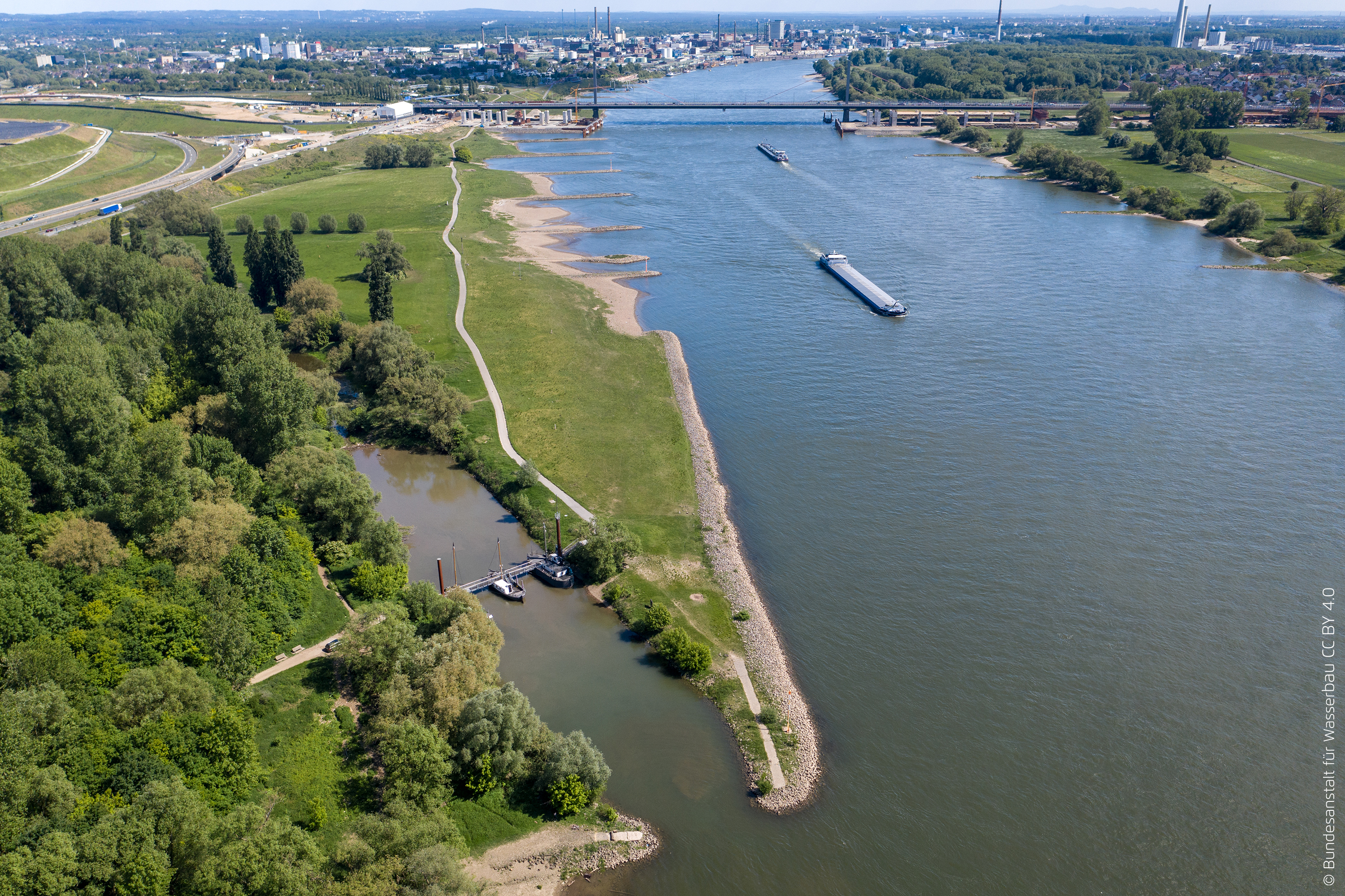
The mouth of the Wupper into the Rhine.

== Tributaries ==
The following rivers are tributaries to the river Wupper (from source to mouth):

- Left: Gaulbach, Brunsbach, Pixwaager Bach, Dörpe, Wilhelmstaler Bach, Hardtbach, Lohbach, Nöllenberger Bach, Stoffelsberger Bach, Hofsiefen, Hengstener Bach, Steinhauser Bach, Lohmühlenbach, Herbringhauser Bach, Marscheider Bach, Eschensiepen, Blombach, Norrenberger Bach, Murmelbach, Fischertaler Bach, Springer Bach, Kothener Bach, Auer Bach, Bendahler Bach, Klusensprung, Holzer Bach, Hatzenbeck, Ossenbeck, Rutenbeck, Glasbach, Burgholzbach, Weilandsiepen, Kaltenbach, Morsbach, Eschbach, Sengbach, Weltersbach, Murbach, Wiembach, Dhünn.
- Right: Kerspe, Hönnige, Neye, Bever, Frohnhauser Bach, Wiebach, Kretzer Bach, Uelfe, Remlingrader Bach, Spreeler Bach, Steinhauserbergbach, Nebenkämper Siefen, Ehrenberger Bach, Steinbruch Siefen, Schmitteborner Bach, Hebbecke, Schwelme, Schwarzbach, Leimbach, Schönebeck, Mirker Bach, Briller Bach, Varresbeck, Lüntenbeck, Rottscheider Bach, Buchenhofener Siepen.

== Other ==
- On July 21, 1950, a young elephant named Tuffi, made to ride on the train by her handler as an advertising stunt, decided she did not like the ride, panicked (and panicked the other, human, passengers), burst out of the car she was riding in, and jumped or fell into the Wupper, only slightly injuring herself. In 1970 Marguerita Eckel and Ernst-Andreas Ziegler published a children's picture book about the incident, Tuffi und die Schwebebahn.
- The Wupper is cited in the German sayings: "Über die Wupper gehen", literally "To go over the Wupper", metaphorically meaning "going bankrupt", "going into jail" or "going to die".
- Else Lasker-Schüler wrote a drama entitled Die Wupper.

== See also ==
- List of rivers of North Rhine-Westphalia
