= Henne =

Henne may refer to:

== People ==
- Albert Leon Henne (1901–1967), American chemist
- Chad Henne (born 1985), American football quarterback
- Diedrich Henne (1834–1903), German born botanist and plant collector
- Ernst Jakob Henne (1904–2005), German motorcycle racer and racecar driver
- Fred W. Henne, labour leader and politician
- Frances E. Henne (1906–1985), American librarian
- Henry Henne (1918–2002), Norwegian linguist
- Josef Anton Henne (1798–1870), Swiss historian and politician active during the formative phase of modern Switzerland
- Jan Henne (born 1947), American former competition swimmer
- Michael Henne (born 1961), member of the Ohio House of Representatives
- Otto Henne am Rhyn (1828–1914), Swiss writer
- Rolf Henne (1901–1966), Swiss politician who supported a form of Nazism
- Rudolf Henne (1913–1962), Bomber Ace in the German Luftwaffe during WW II

== Other uses ==
- Henne (magazine), a Norwegian women's magazine
- Henne (river), of North Rhine-Westphalia, Germany
- Kleine Henne, a river of North Rhine-Westphalia, Germany
- Haine (German name Henne), a river in southern Belgium and northern France
- Henne Jewelers, a jewelry store in Pittsburgh
- Robert Henne House, located in the West End of Davenport, Iowa, United States
- Kalitharu Henne, a 1963 Indian Kannada film
- Fred Henne Territorial Park, in the Northwest Territories of Canada
