= Steinbecke =

Steinbecke may refer to:

- Steinbecke (Möhne), a river of North Rhine-Westphalia, Germany, tributary of the Möhne
- Steinbecke (Valme), a river of North Rhine-Westphalia, Germany, tributary of the Valme

== See also ==
- Steinbeke
