= Gellinghausen =

- Stadtteil of Schmallenberg
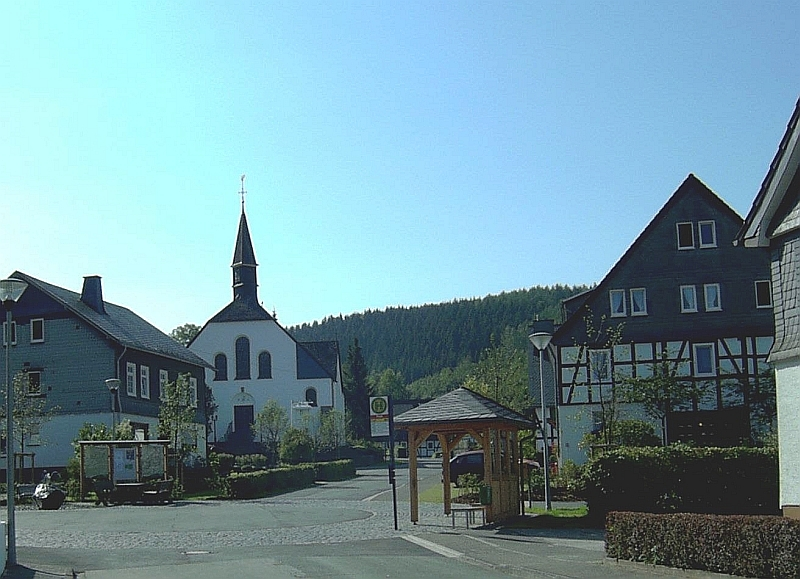
- Interactive map of Gellinghausen
- Location within Germany Location within North Rhine-Westphalia
- Coordinates: 51°14′41″N 8°21′31″E
- Country: Germany
- State: North Rhine-Westphalia
- Admin. region: Arnsberg
- District: Hochsauerlandkreis
- Town: Schmallenberg

Population (2021-12-31)
  - Total: 97
- Time zone: UTC+01:00 (CET)
  - Summer (DST): UTC+02:00 (CEST)

Gellinghausen is a locality in the municipality Schmallenberg in the district Hochsauerlandkreis in North Rhine-Westphalia, Germany.

The village has 97 inhabitants and lies in the north of the municipality of Schmallenberg at a height of around 480 m. Gellinghausen borders on the villages of Westernbödefeld, Bödefeld, Osterwald, Rimberg, Oberrarbach and Dornheim. The Gellinghausen brook flows through the village. The Landstraße 776 on the outskirts runs parallel to Dorfstrasse.

Gellinghausen was first mentioned in 1280 in a document. The village used to belong to the municipality of Bödefeld Land in Amt Fredeburg until the end of 1974.

== Gallery ==
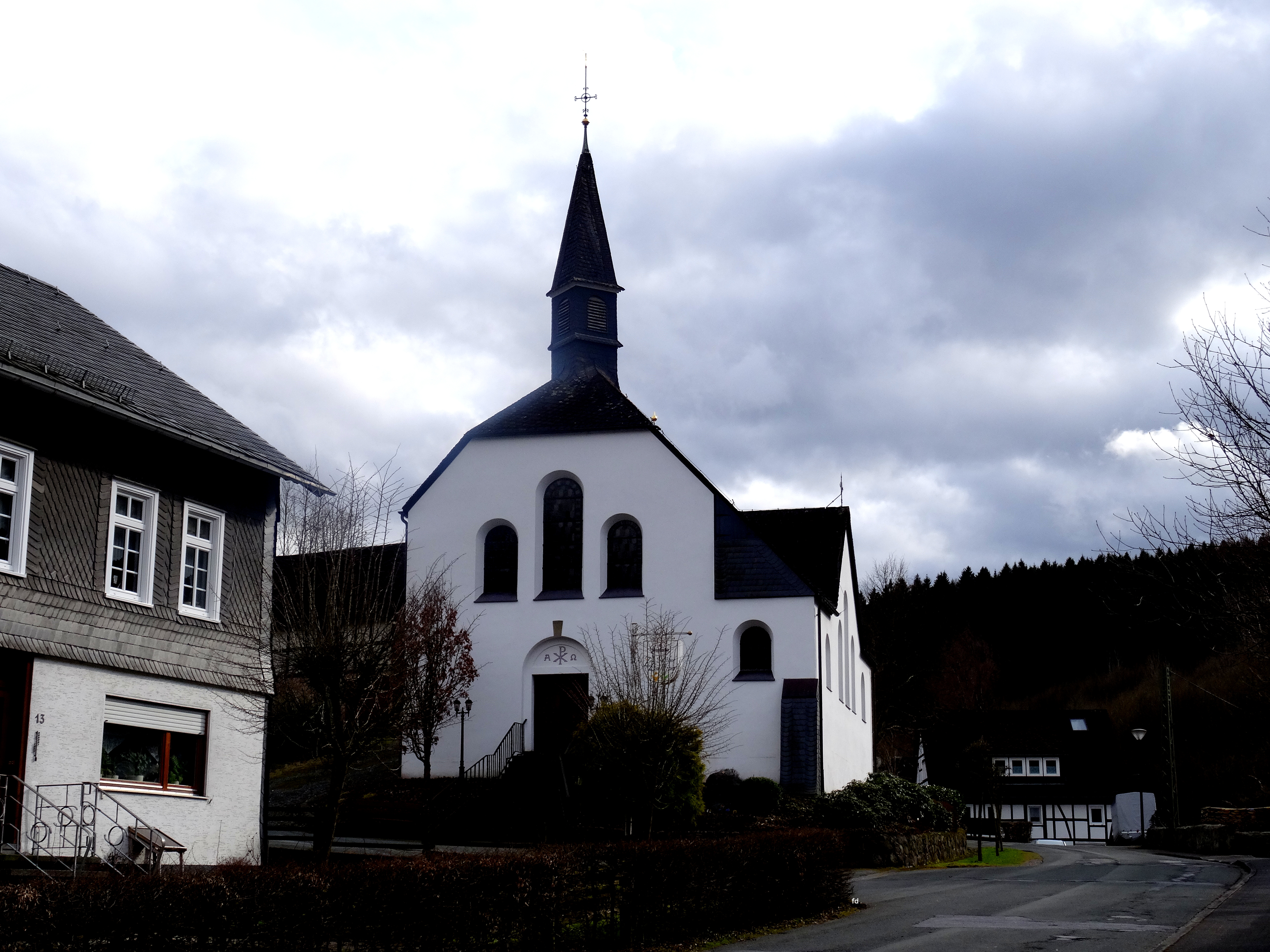
St.-Vinzenz-Cappel

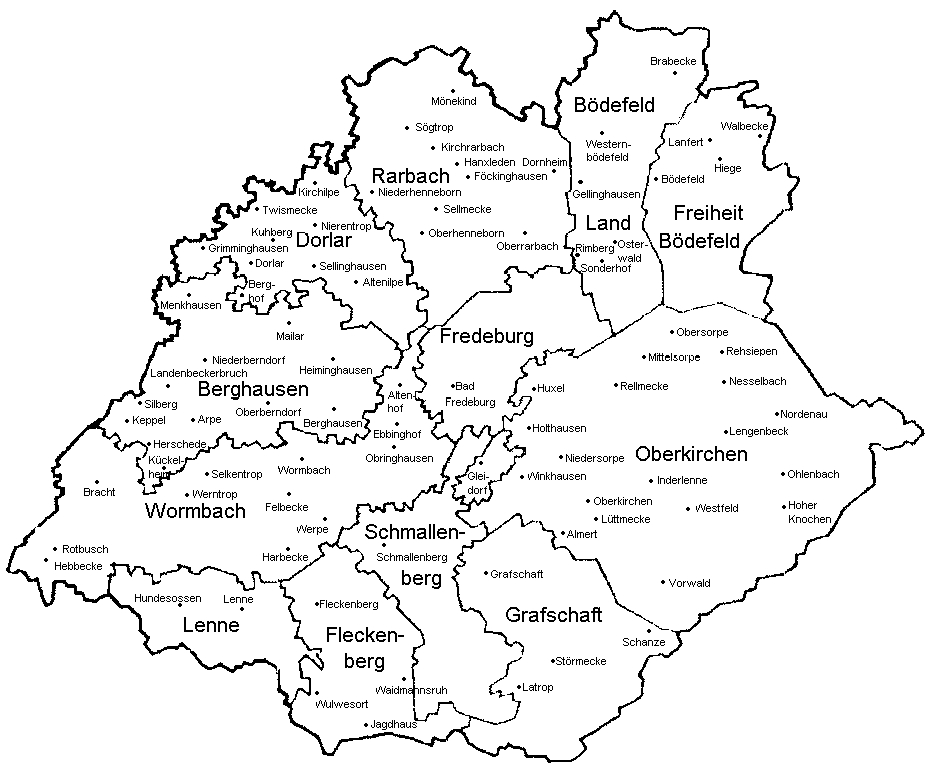
Places in the town Schmallenberg and outline of the former municipalities before 1975
