= Oberhenneborn =

- Stadtteil of Schmallenberg
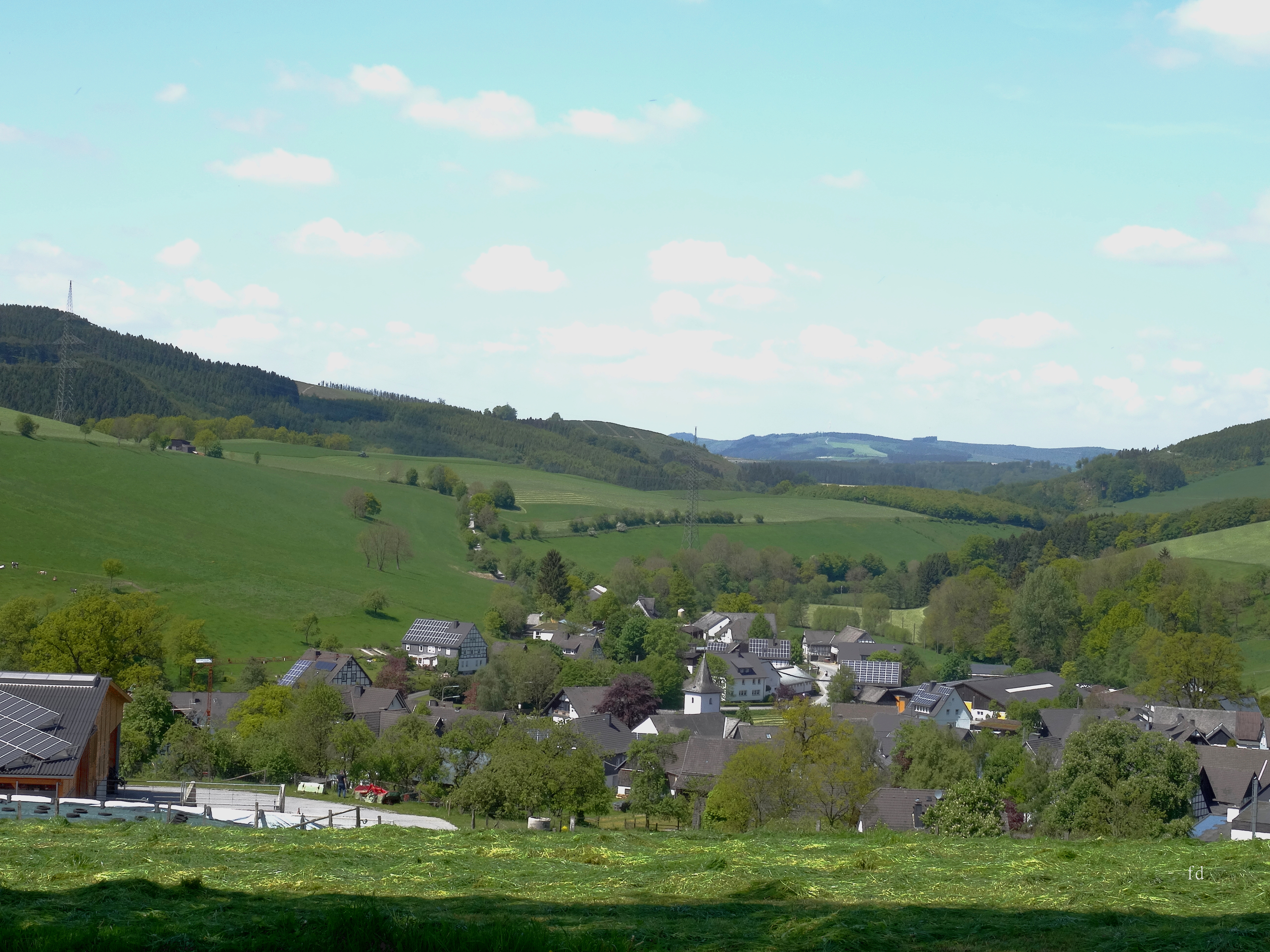
- Interactive map of Oberhenneborn
- Location within Germany Location within North Rhine-Westphalia
- Coordinates: 51°14′0″N 8°17′50″E
- Country: Germany
- State: North Rhine-Westphalia
- Admin. region: Arnsberg
- District: Hochsauerlandkreis
- Town: Schmallenberg

Population (2021-12-31)
  - Total: 388
- Time zone: UTC+01:00 (CET)
  - Summer (DST): UTC+02:00 (CEST)

Oberhenneborn is a locality in the municipality Schmallenberg in the district Hochsauerlandkreis in North Rhine-Westphalia, Germany.

The village has 388 inhabitants and lies in the north of the municipality of Schmallenberg at a height of around 430 m on the Landstraße 914. Oberhenneborn borders on the villages of Altenilpe, Kirchilpe, Nierentrop, Niederhenneborn, Sögtrop, Kirchrarbach, Hanxleden, Föckinghausen, Oberrarbach and Sellmecke. The river Henne flows through the village.

Oberhenneborn was first mentioned in 1326 in a document. The village used to belong to the municipality of Rarbach in Amt Fredeburg until the end of 1974.

== Gallery ==
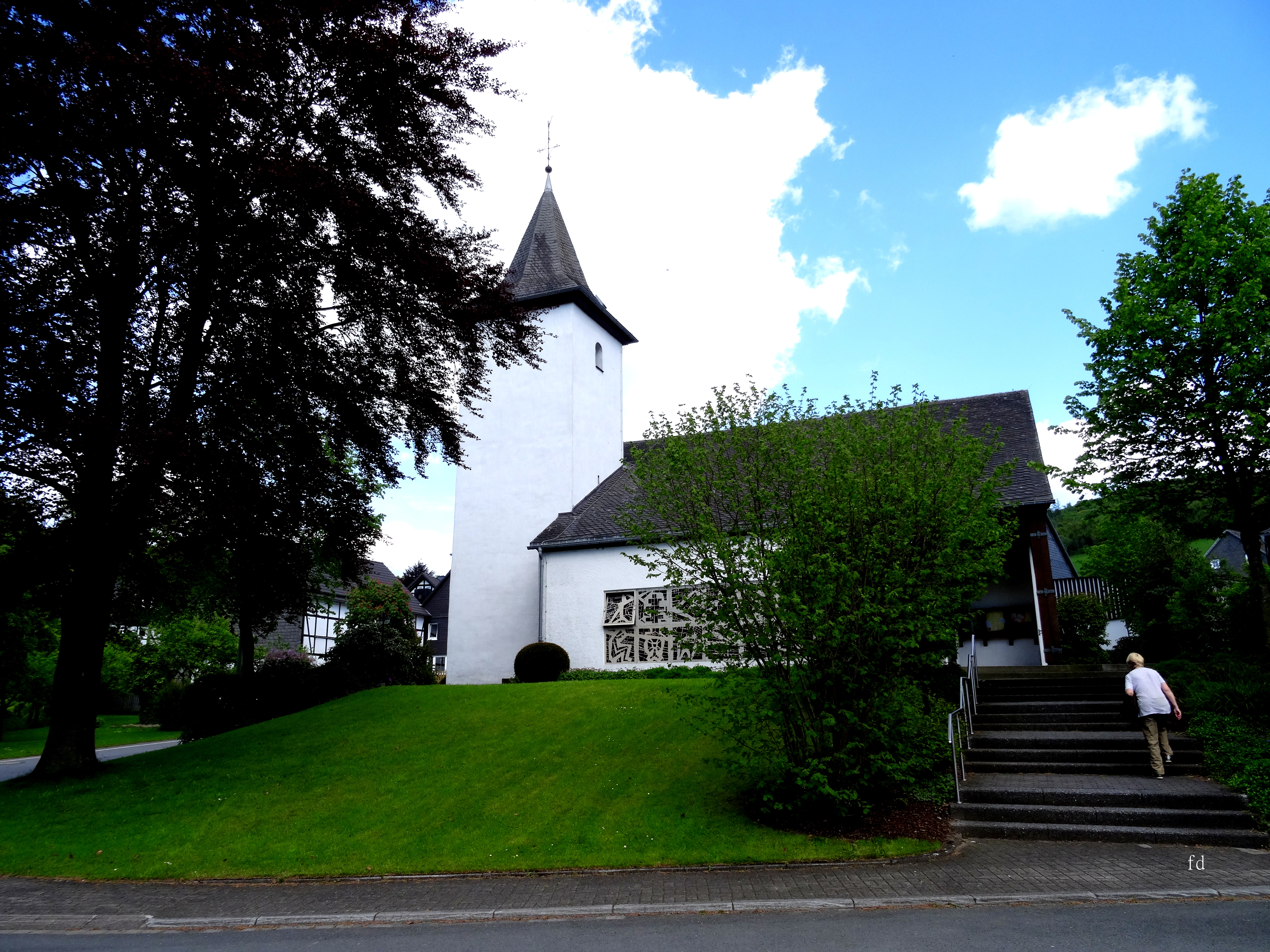
Oberhenneborn, Saint Agatha Church

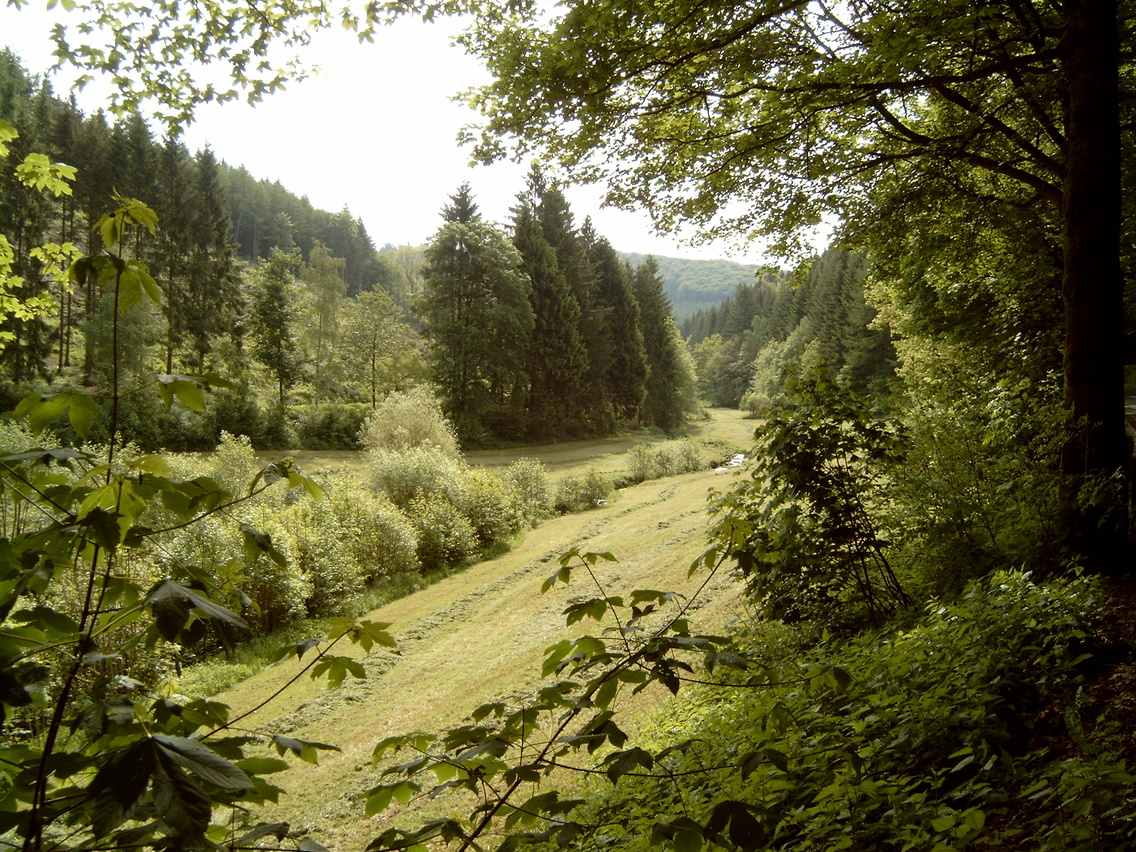
River Henne
