= Brabecke =

Locality in North Rhine-Westphalia, Germany

- Stadtteil of Schmallenberg
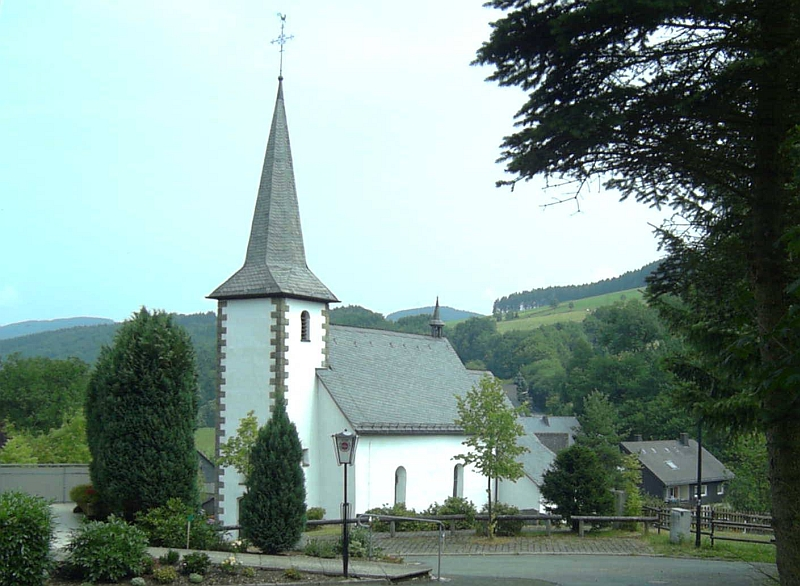
- Interactive map of Brabecke
- Location within Germany Location within North Rhine-Westphalia
- Coordinates: 51°16′N 8°23′E
- Country: Germany
- State: North Rhine-Westphalia
- Admin. region: Arnsberg
- District: Hochsauerlandkreis
- Town: Schmallenberg

Population (2021-12-31)
  - Total: 194
- Time zone: UTC+01:00 (CET)
  - Summer (DST): UTC+02:00 (CEST)

Brabecke is a locality in the municipality Schmallenberg in the district Hochsauerlandkreis in North Rhine-Westphalia, Germany.

The village has 194 inhabitants and lies in the north of the municipality of Schmallenberg at a height of around 141 m. Brabecke borders on the villages of Ramsbeck, Untervalme, Obervalme, Bödefeld und Westernbödefeld.

Brabecke is mentioned for the first time in 1203. Knight Godard von Meschede built a permanent house or small castle in Brabecke in 1328, which was under the feudal lord Count Wilhelm von Arnsberg of the county of Arnsberg. The building existed until 1740. The village used to belong to the municipality of Bödefeld Land in Amt Fredeburg until the end of 1974.
