= Kirchrarbach =

- Stadtteil of Schmallenberg
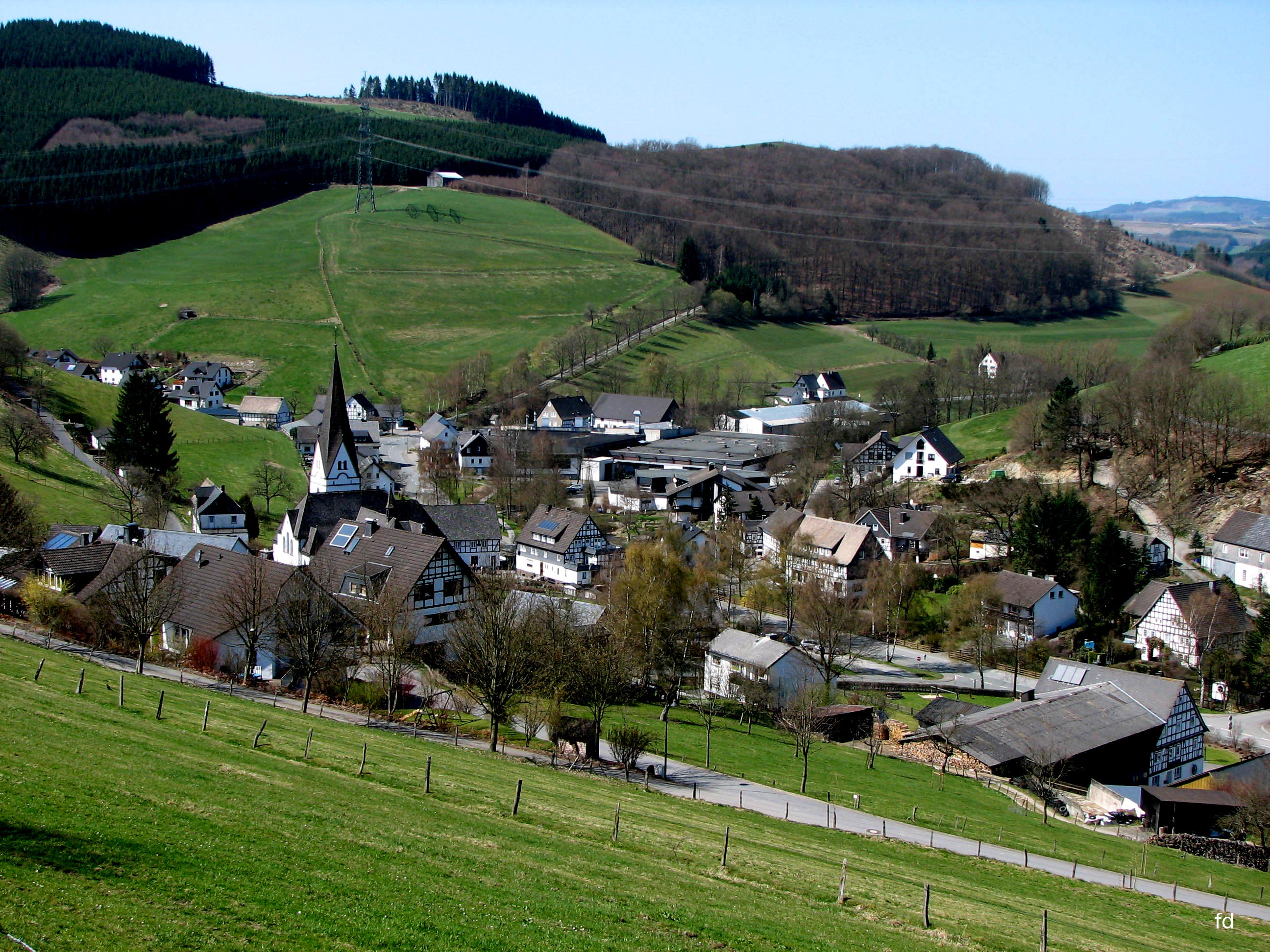
- Interactive map of Kirchrarbach
- Location within Germany Location within North Rhine-Westphalia
- Coordinates: 51°15′13″N 8°17′54″E
- Country: Germany
- State: North Rhine-Westphalia
- Admin. region: Arnsberg
- District: Hochsauerlandkreis
- Town: Schmallenberg

Population (2021-12-31)
  - Total: 273
- Time zone: UTC+01:00 (CET)
  - Summer (DST): UTC+02:00 (CEST)

Kirchrarbach is a locality in the municipality Schmallenberg in the district Hochsauerlandkreis in North Rhine-Westphalia, Germany.

The village has 273 inhabitants and lies in the north of the municipality of Schmallenberg at a height of around 393 m on the Kreisstraße 38. The river Rarbach flows through the village. Kirchrarbach borders on the villages of Hanxleden, Niederhenneborn, Sellmecke, Oberhenneborn and Sögtrop.

The village used to belong to the municipality of Rarbach in Amt Fredeburg until the end of 1974.

== Gallery ==
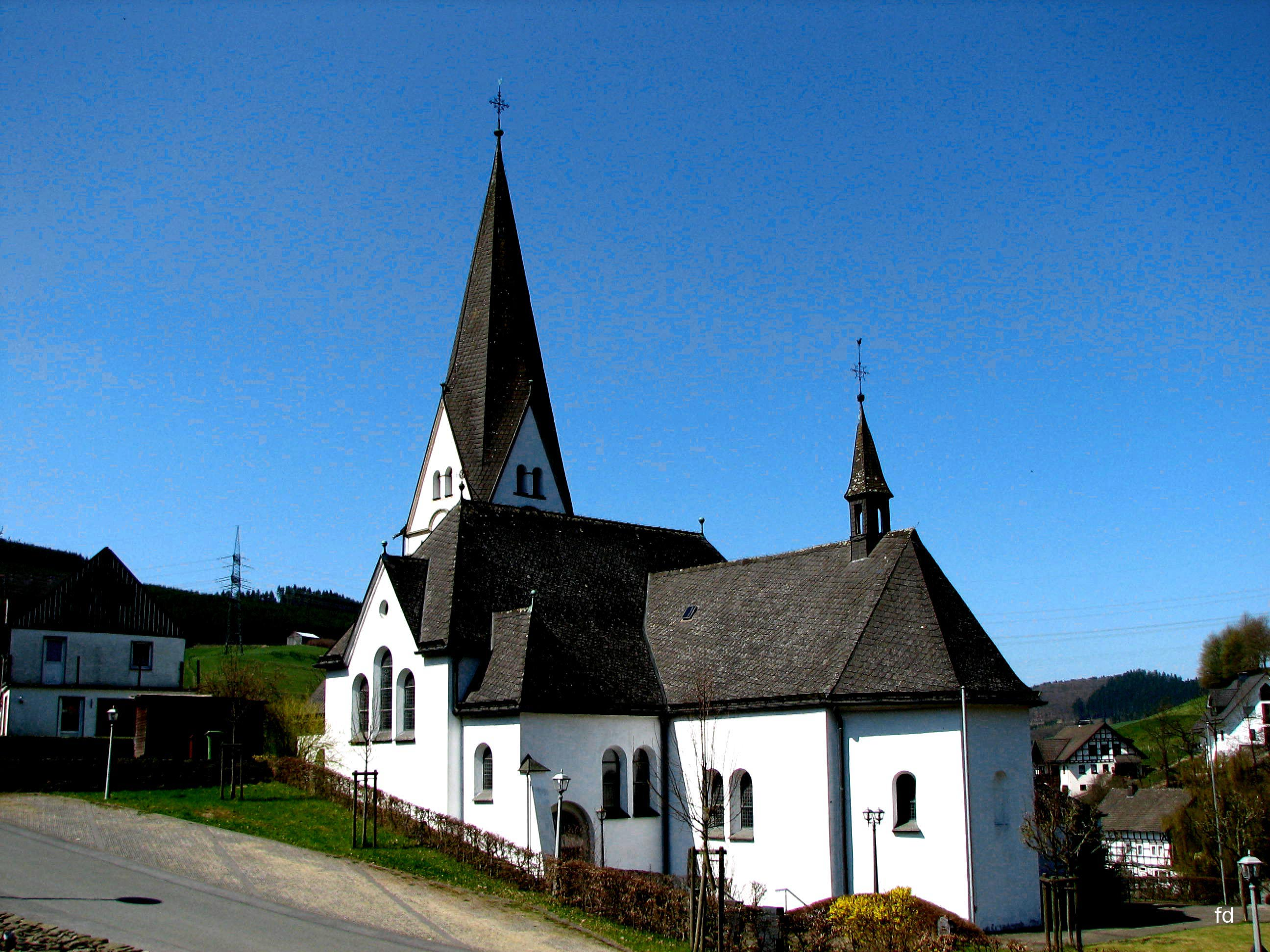
Saint Lambertus Church

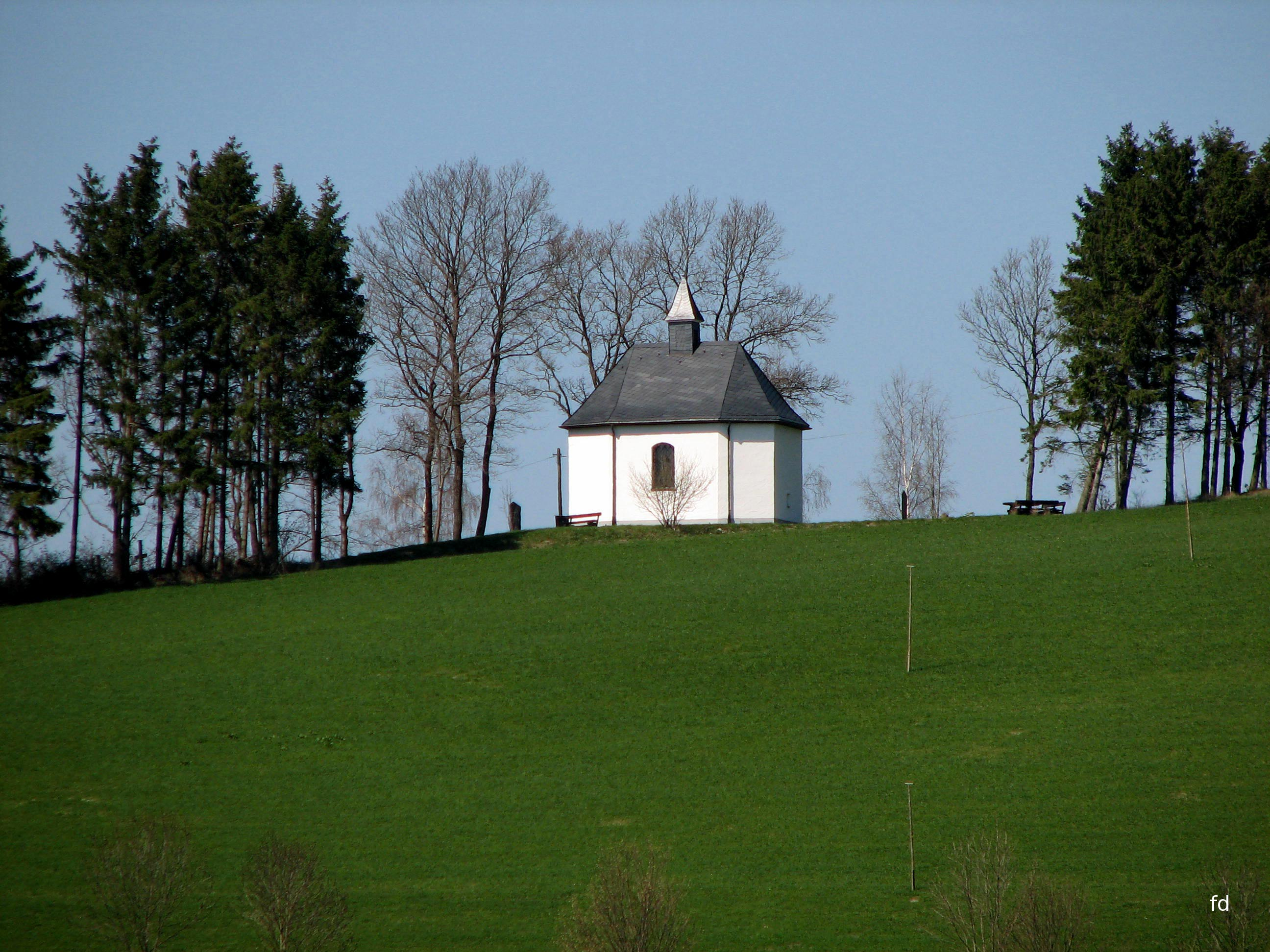
Kreuzberg Chapel
