= Störner =

Mountain in Germany

Highest point
- Peak: Rimberg (497.7m)
- Coordinates: 50.82421°N 8.61362°E

Dimensions
- Area: 66.56 km^{2} (25.70 mi^{2})

Geography
- Location: Hesse, Germany
- Country: Germany
- District: Marburg-Biedenkopf district

Störner is a mountain of Hesse, Germany. They are in the Natural regions number 32.
