= Föckinghausen =

- Stadtteil of Schmallenberg
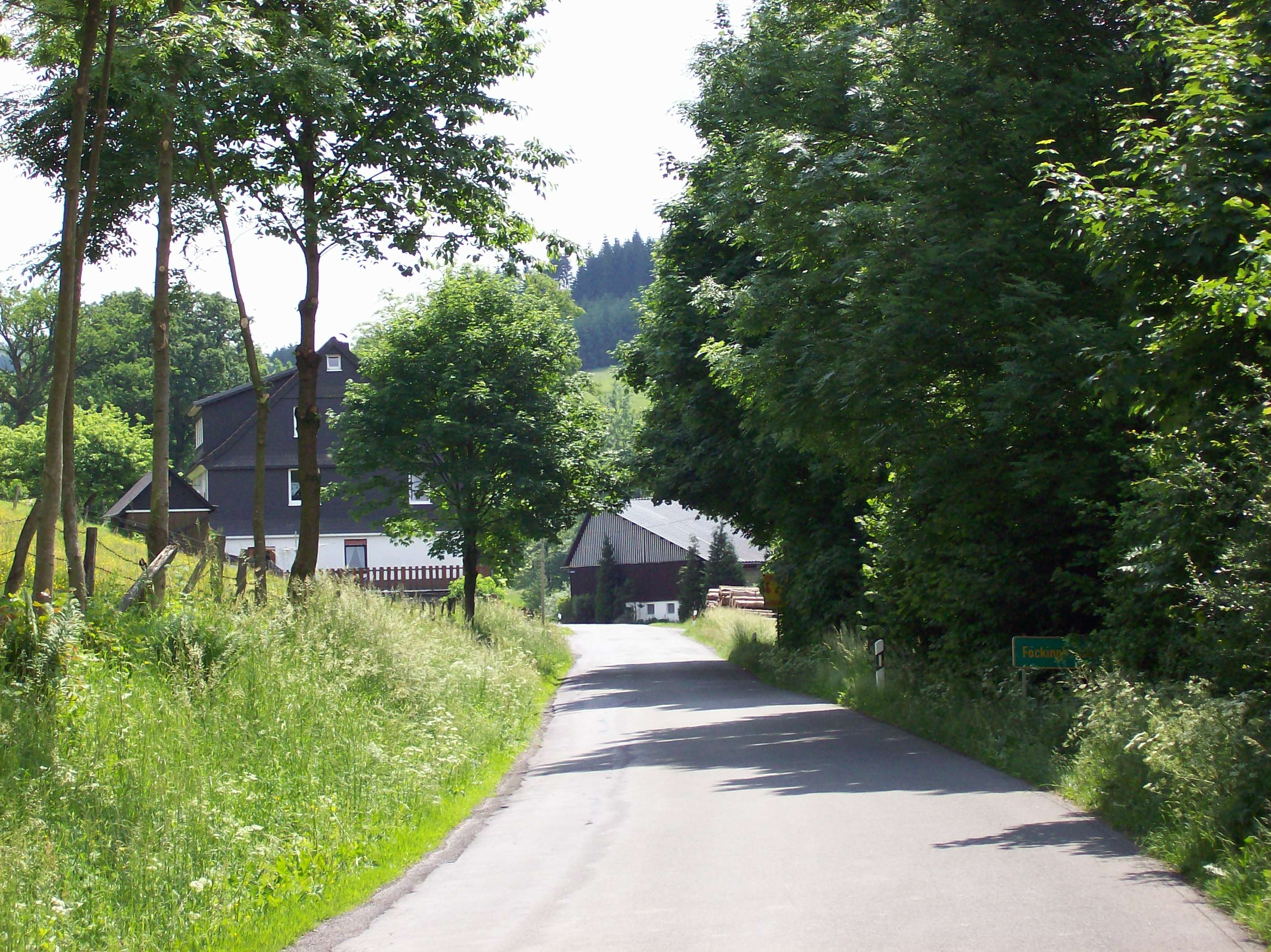
- Interactive map of Föckinghausen
- Location within Germany Location within North Rhine-Westphalia
- Coordinates: 51°14′28″N 8°19′04″E
- Country: Germany
- State: North Rhine-Westphalia
- Admin. region: Arnsberg
- District: Hochsauerlandkreis
- Town: Schmallenberg

Population (2021-12-31)
  - Total: 9
- Time zone: UTC+01:00 (CET)
  - Summer (DST): UTC+02:00 (CEST)

Föckinghausen is a locality in the municipality Schmallenberg in the district Hochsauerlandkreis in North Rhine-Westphalia, Germany.

The village has 9 inhabitants and lies in the north of the municipality of Schmallenberg at a height of around 450 m. Föckinghausen borders on the villages of Oberhenneborn, Oberrarbach, Hanxleden and Dornheim.

The village used to belong to the municipality of Rarbach in Amt Fredeburg until the end of 1974.
