= Otto Henne am Rhyn =

Swiss writer (1828–1914)

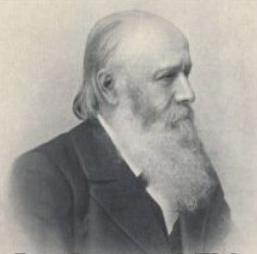

Otto Henne am Rhyn (August 26, 1828 in St. Gallen – April 30, 1914 in Weiz) was a Swiss writer.

He was a son of Josef Anton Henne called "von Sargans". After marrying Elisabeth am Rhyn, a member of the important Lucerne family am Rhyn, he added her name to his own family name. After studying philosophy and history in Bern and Geneva, he became a teacher at a school in St. Gallen in 1857. Between 1859 and 1877, as well as between 1885 and 1912, he was state archivist in St. Gallen. Between 1872 and 1879, he had been an editor in Leipzig and Hirschberg (Silesia), from 1879 to 1885 at the NZZ. Since 1861, he was an active member of the Freemasons.

== Works ==
- Geschichte des Schweizervolkes und seiner Kultur von den ältesten Zeiten bis zur Gegenwart (1865–1866)
- Allgemeine Kulturgeschichte (8 volumes; 1877–1908)
- Die Kreuzzüge und die Kultur ihrer Zeit (1 vol - 1880? - illustré par Gustave Doré)
- Kulturgeschichte des deutschen Volkes (2 volumes, 1886)
- Geschichte des Rittertums (ein Nachdruck ist im Phaidon-Verlag, Essen, erschienen)
- Geschichte des Kantons St. Gallen (2 volumes, 1863–1896)
- Mysteria: a history of the secret doctrines and mystic rites of ancient religions and medieval and modern secret orders (1895 - translated by Joseph Fitzgerald)
- Kulturgeschichte des jüdischen Volkes von den ältesten Zeiten bis zur Gegenwart. Hermann Costenoble. Iena. 1892
