= Oberrarbach =

- Stadtteil of Schmallenberg
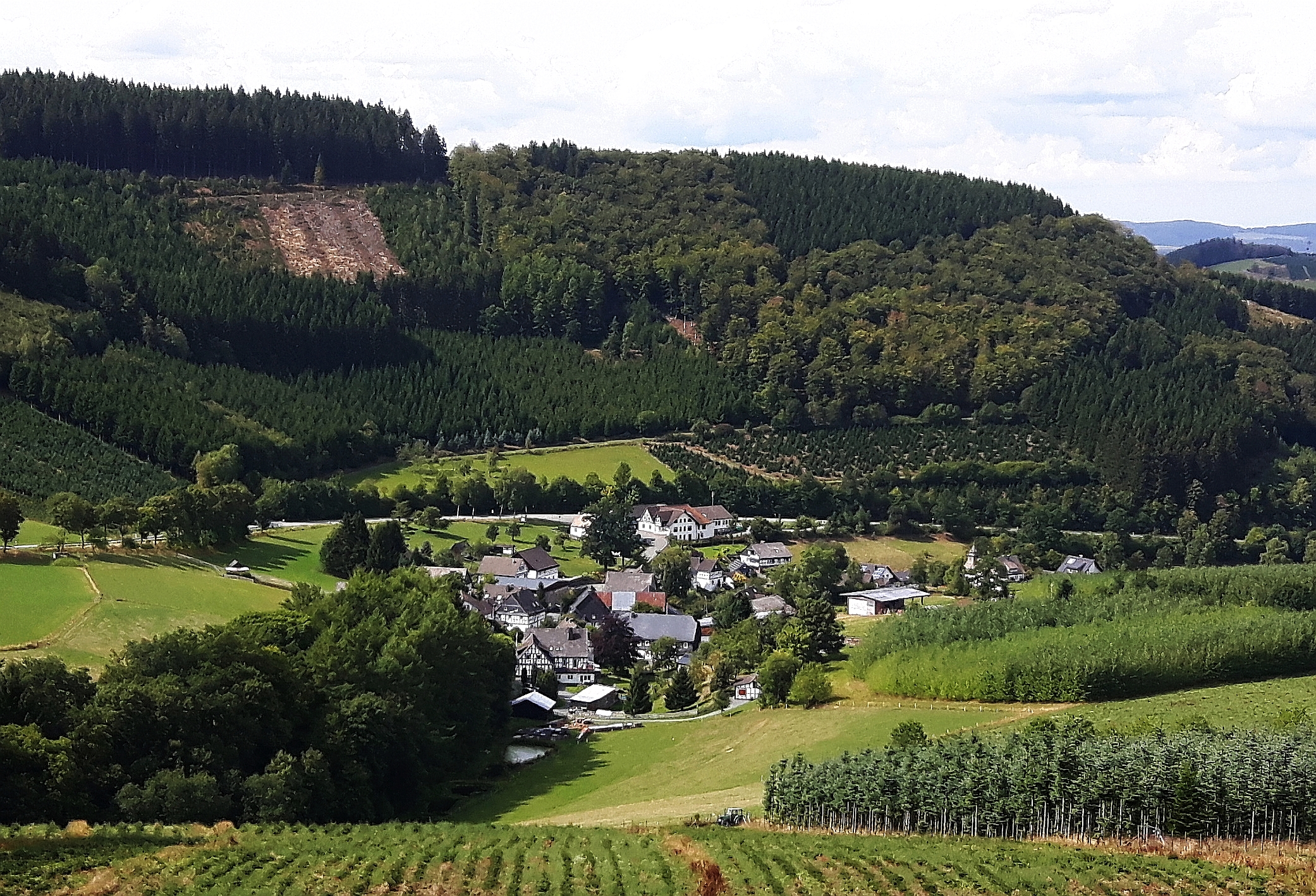
- Interactive map of Oberrarbach
- Location within Germany Location within North Rhine-Westphalia
- Coordinates: 51°13′45″N 8°19′22″E
- Country: Germany
- State: North Rhine-Westphalia
- Admin. region: Arnsberg
- District: Hochsauerlandkreis
- Town: Schmallenberg

Population (2021-12-31)
  - Total: 52
- Time zone: UTC+01:00 (CET)
  - Summer (DST): UTC+02:00 (CEST)

Oberrarbach is a locality in the municipality Schmallenberg in the district Hochsauerlandkreis in North Rhine-Westphalia, Germany.

The village has 52 inhabitants and lies in the west of the municipality of Schmallenberg at a height of around 512 m. Oberrarbach borders on the villages of Oberhenneborn, Sellmecke, Föckinghausen and Gellinghausen.

The village used to belong to the municipality of Rarbach in Amt Fredeburg until the end of 1974.

== Gallery ==
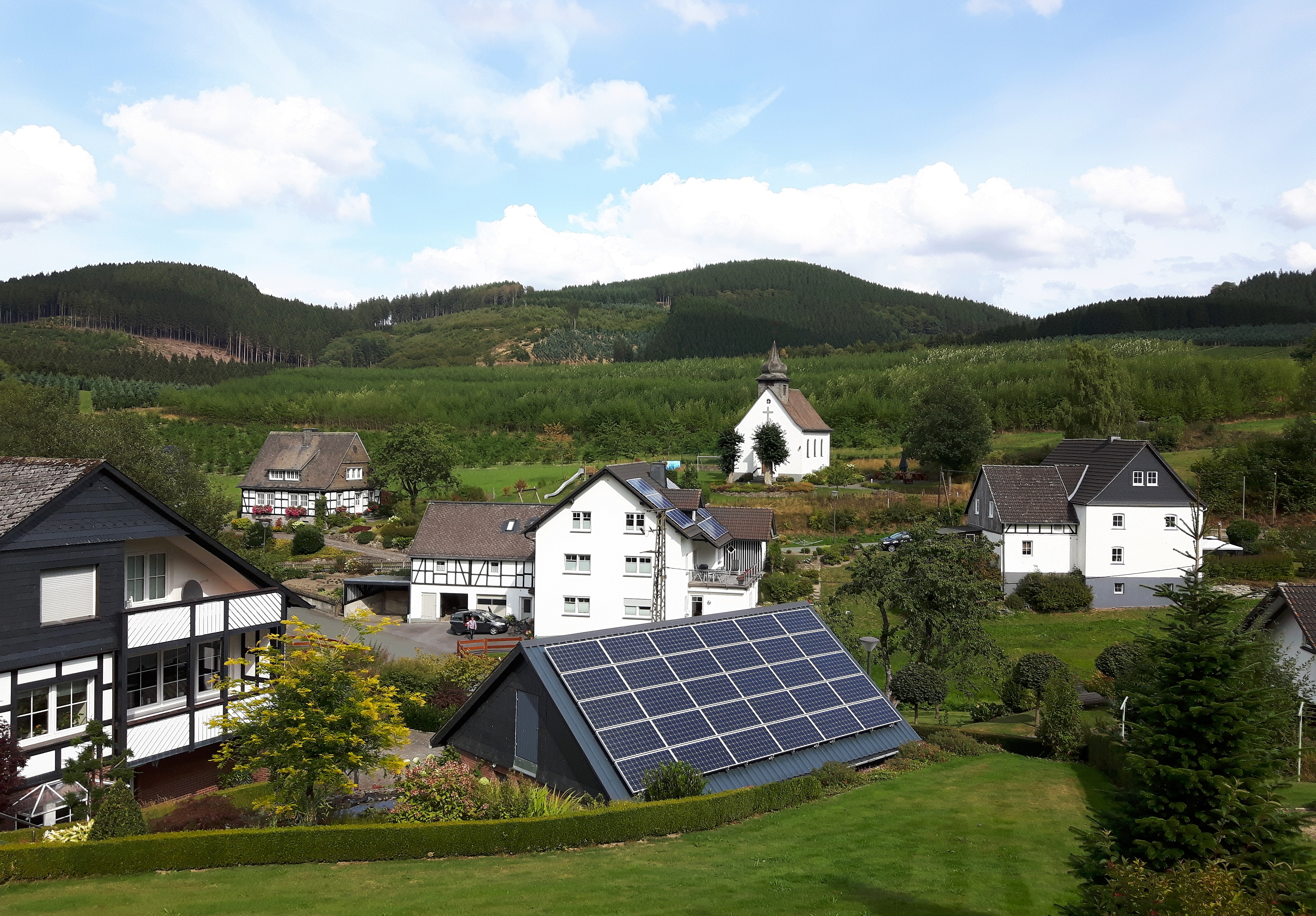
Oberrarbach

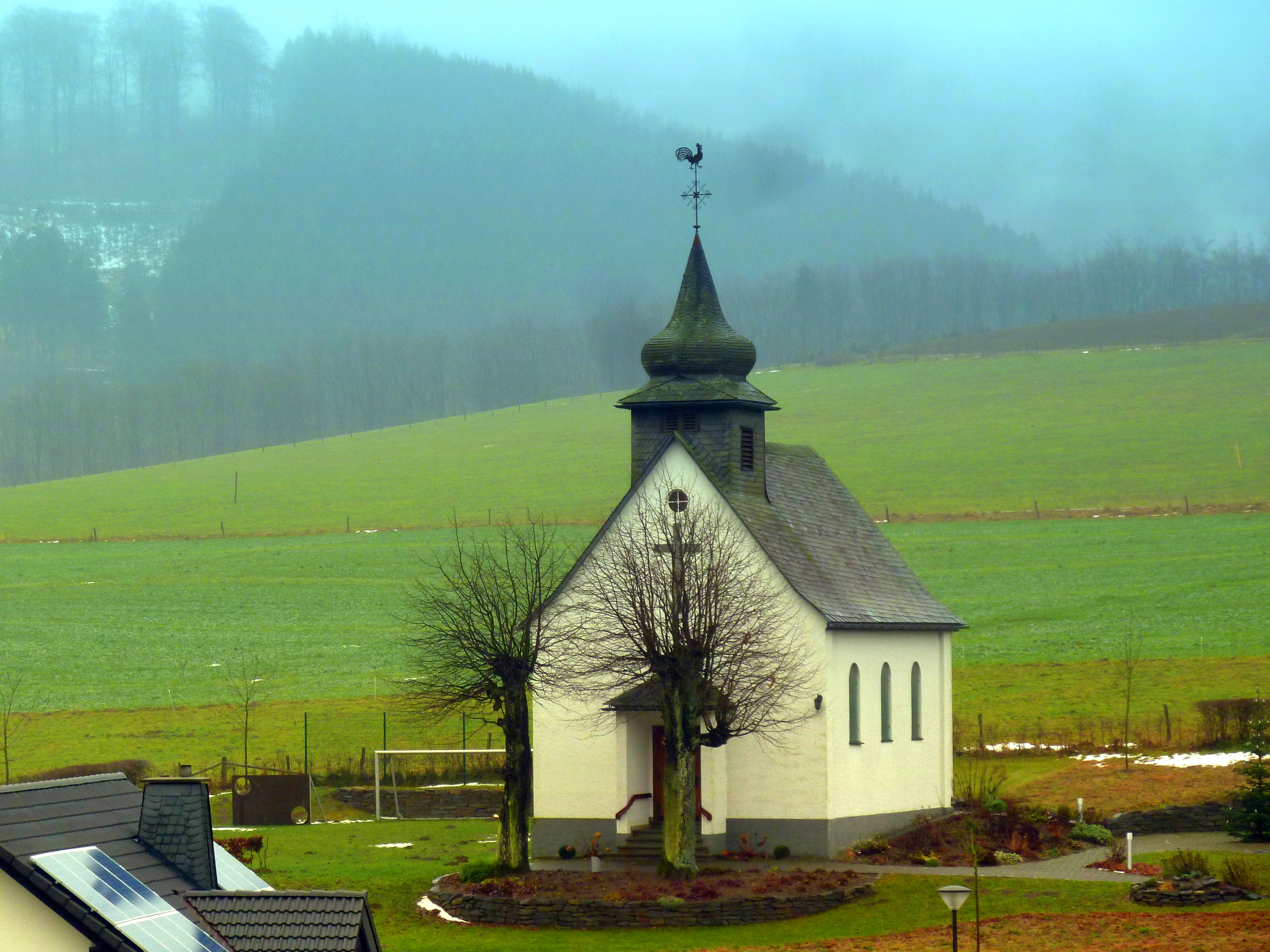
Chapel Anthony the Great
