= Steinbecke (Valme) =

River in Germany

Location
- Country: Germany
- State: North Rhine-Westphalia

Physical characteristics
- Mouth
  - location: Valme
  - coordinates: 51.2647°N 8.4100°E

Basin features
- Progression: Valme→ Ruhr→ Rhine→ North Sea

Steinbecke is a small river of North Rhine-Westphalia, Germany. It is 1.3 km (0.8 mi) long and is a right tributary of the Valme.

== See also ==
- List of rivers of North Rhine-Westphalia
