= Kleine Henne =

River in Germany

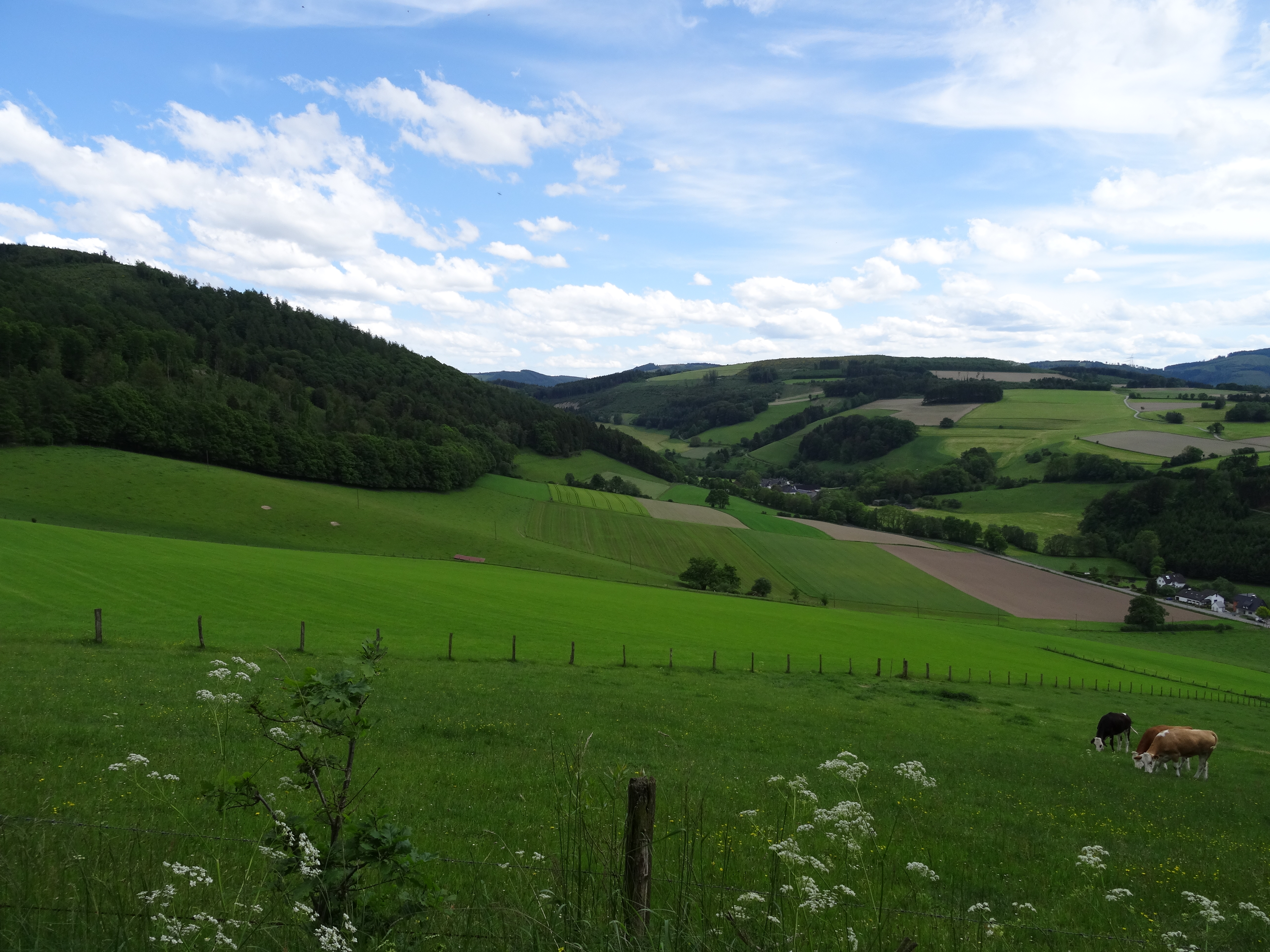

Location
- Country: Germany
- State: North Rhine-Westphalia

Physical characteristics
- Mouth
  - location: Henne
  - coordinates: 51.3400°N 8.2844°E
- Length: 18.0 km (11.2 mi)

Basin features
- Progression: Henne→ Ruhr→ Rhine→ North Sea

Kleine Henne is a river of North Rhine-Westphalia, Germany. It flows into the Henne near Meschede.

== See also ==
- List of rivers of North Rhine-Westphalia
