= Sellmecke =

- Stadtteil of Schmallenberg
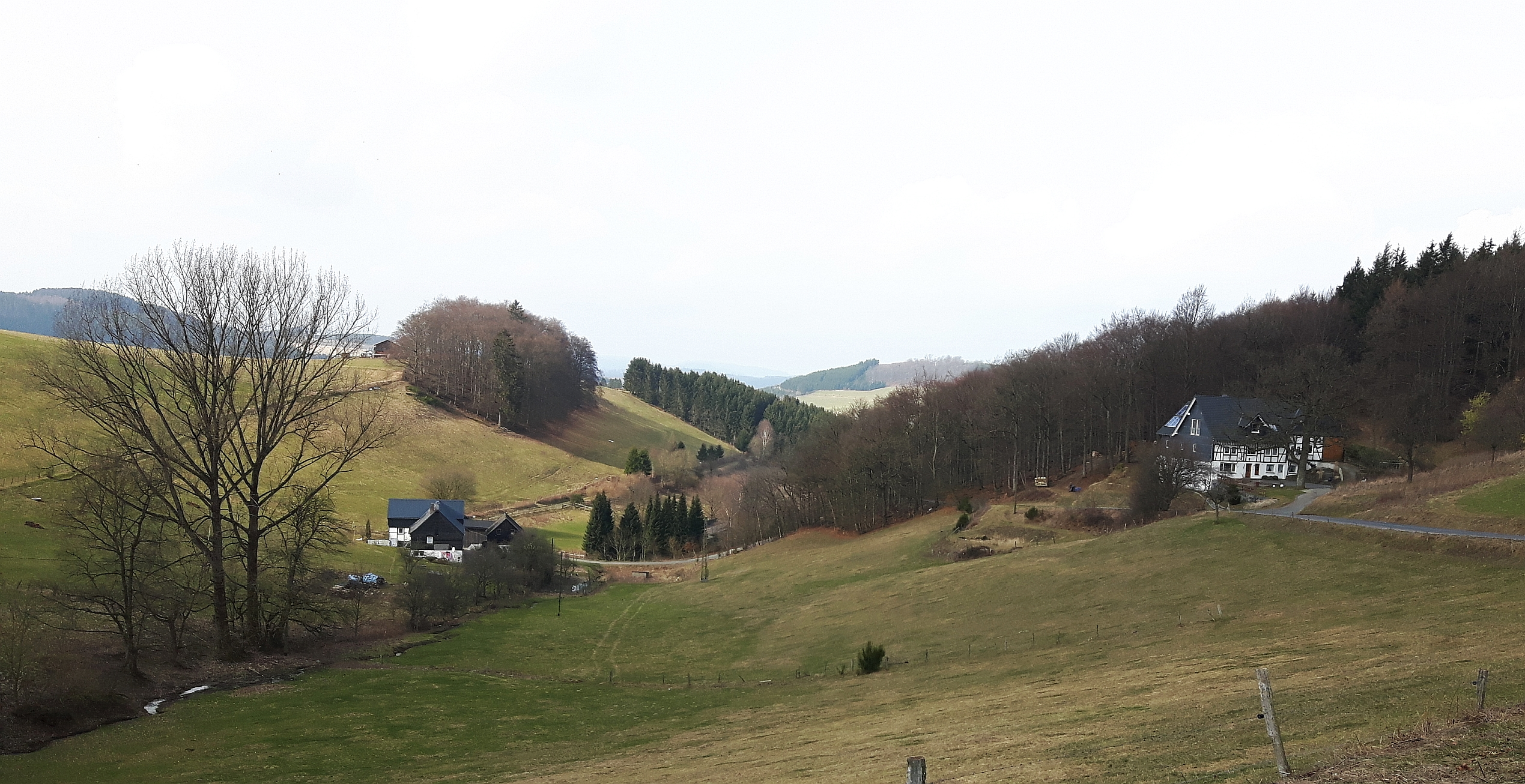
- Interactive map of Sellmecke
- Location within Germany Location within North Rhine-Westphalia
- Coordinates: 51°14′29″N 8°18′17″E
- Country: Germany
- State: North Rhine-Westphalia
- Admin. region: Arnsberg
- District: Hochsauerlandkreis
- Town: Schmallenberg

Population (2021-12-31)
  - Total: 13
- Time zone: UTC+01:00 (CET)
  - Summer (DST): UTC+02:00 (CEST)

Sellmecke is a locality in the municipality Schmallenberg in the district Hochsauerlandkreis in North Rhine-Westphalia, Germany.

The village has 13 inhabitants and lies in the north of the municipality of Schmallenberg at a height of around 480 m. Sellmecke borders on the villages of Oberrarbach, Oberhenneborn, Niederhenneborn and Kirchrarbach.

The village used to belong to the municipality of Rarbach in Amt Fredeburg until the end of 1974.
