= Brabecke (Valme) =

River in Germany

Location
- Country: Germany
- State: North Rhine-Westphalia

Physical characteristics
- Mouth
  - location: Valme
  - coordinates: 51.3008°N 8.4053°E
- Length: 13.6 km (8.5 mi)

Basin features
- Progression: Valme→ Ruhr→ Rhine→ North Sea

Brabecke is a river of North Rhine-Westphalia, Germany. It is a left tributary of the Valme.

== See also ==
- List of rivers of North Rhine-Westphalia
