= Westernbödefeld =

- Stadtteil of Schmallenberg
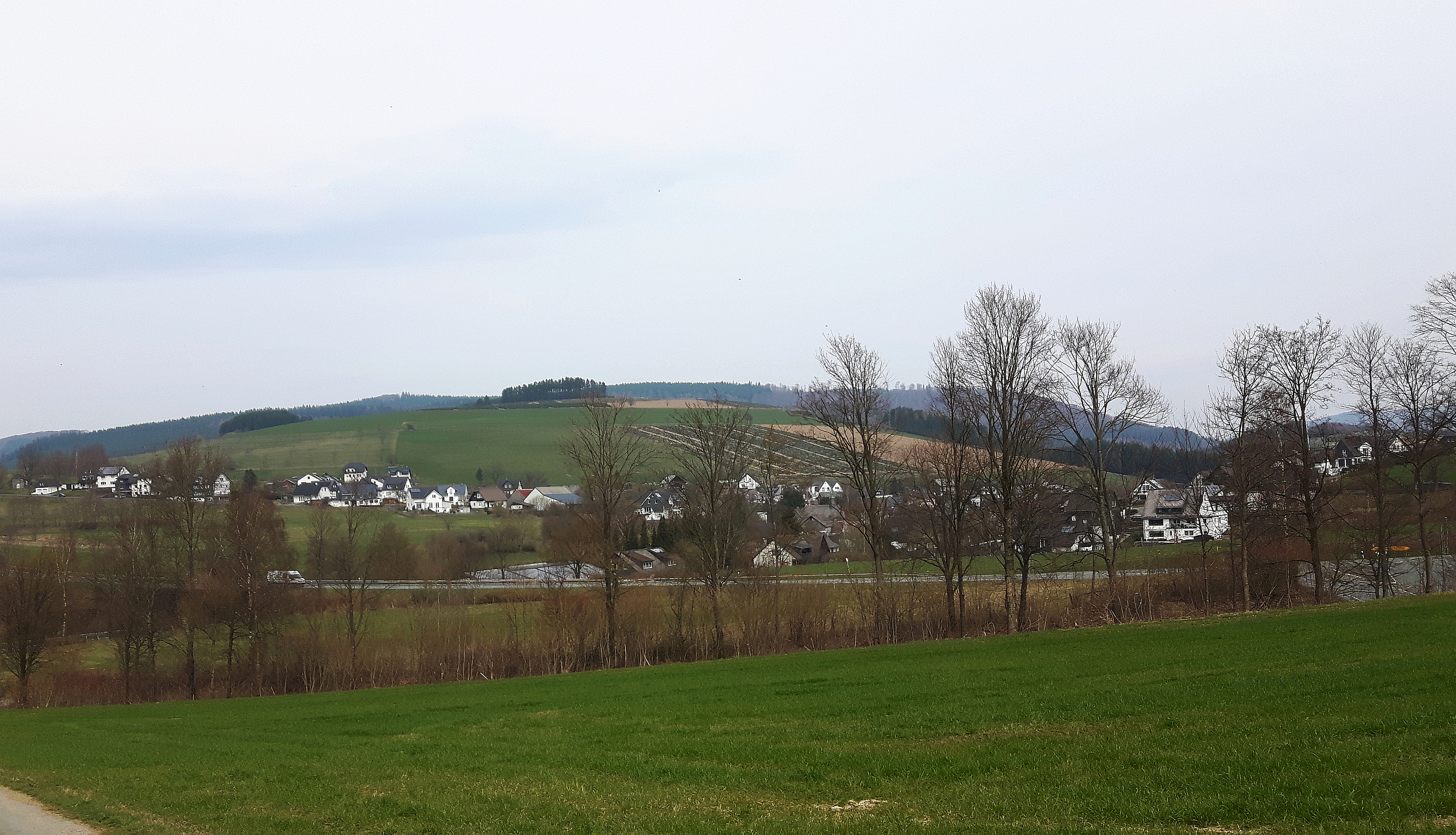
- Interactive map of Westernbödefeld
- Location within Germany Location within North Rhine-Westphalia
- Coordinates: 51°15′25″N 8°22′18″E
- Country: Germany
- State: North Rhine-Westphalia
- Admin. region: Arnsberg
- District: Hochsauerlandkreis
- Town: Schmallenberg

Population (2021-12-31)
  - Total: 316
- Time zone: UTC+01:00 (CET)
  - Summer (DST): UTC+02:00 (CEST)

Westernbödefeld is a locality in the municipality Schmallenberg in the district Hochsauerlandkreis in North Rhine-Westphalia, Germany.

The village has 316 inhabitants and lies in the north of the municipality of Schmallenberg at a height of around 443 m. Westernbödefeld borders on the villages of Brabecke, Bödefeld, Gellinghausen, Dornheim and Frielinghausen. In the village centre the river Palme flows in the Brabecke and the Landstraße 776 meets the Landstraße L 740.

Westernbödefeld was first mentioned in 1314 in a document. The village used to belong to the municipality of Bödefeld Land in Amt Fredeburg until the end of 1974.

== Gallery ==
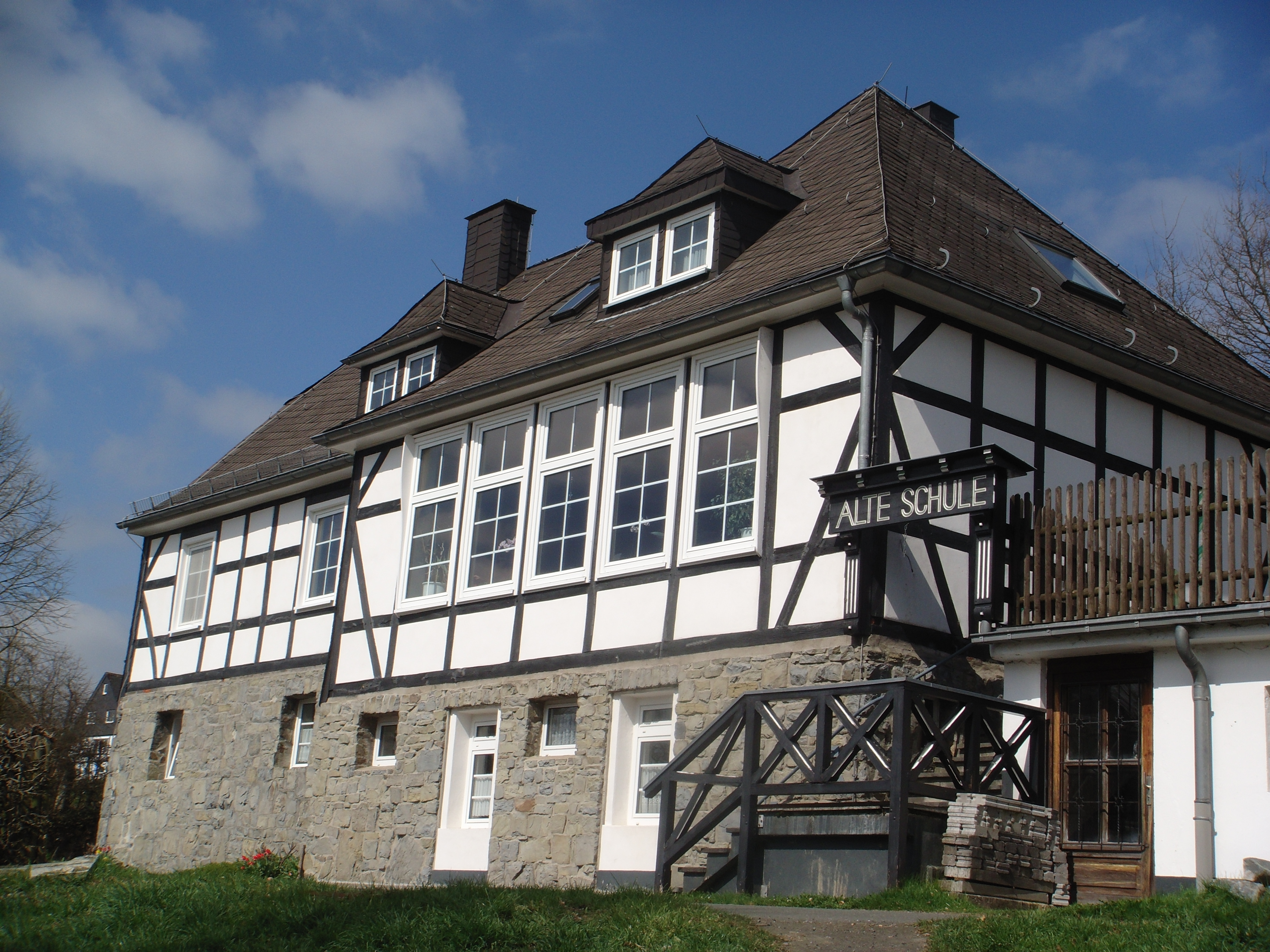
Old School

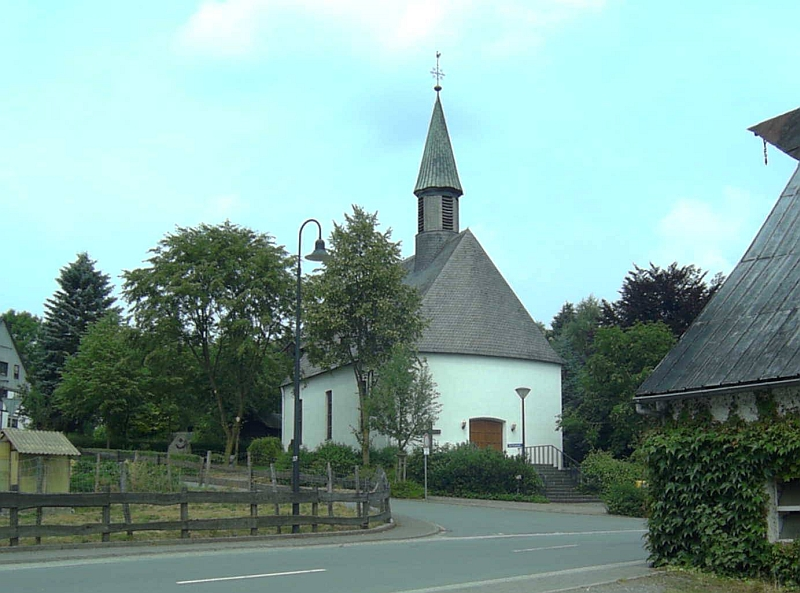
Chappel Saint Mary
