= Sögtrop =

- Stadtteil of Schmallenberg
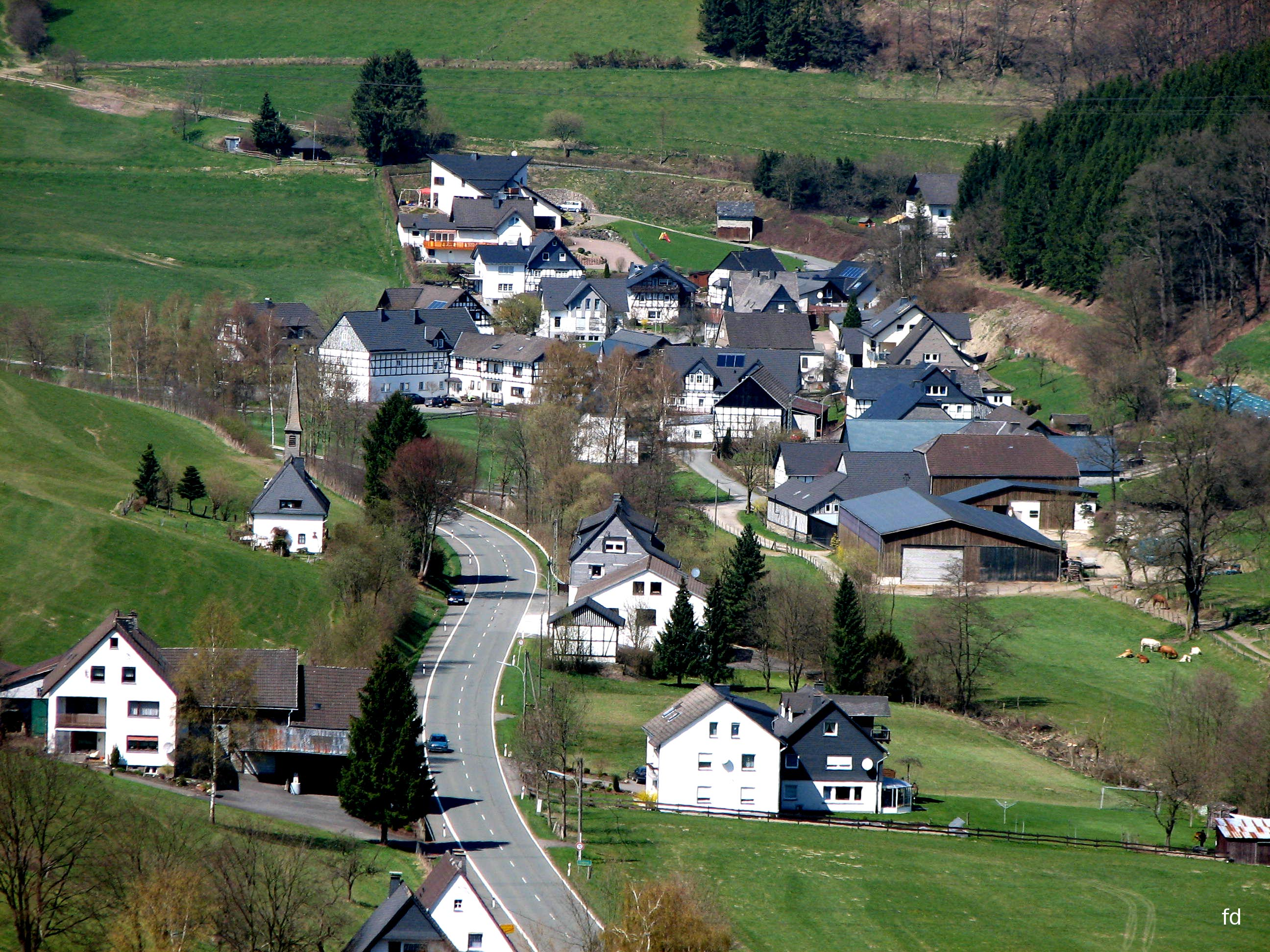
- Interactive map of Sögtrop
- Location within Germany Location within North Rhine-Westphalia
- Coordinates: 51°15′44″N 8°17′18″E
- Country: Germany
- State: North Rhine-Westphalia
- Admin. region: Arnsberg
- District: Hochsauerlandkreis
- Town: Schmallenberg

Population (2021-12-31)
  - Total: 109
- Time zone: UTC+01:00 (CET)
  - Summer (DST): UTC+02:00 (CEST)

Sögtrop is a locality in the municipality Schmallenberg in the district Hochsauerlandkreis in North Rhine-Westphalia, Germany.

The village has 109 inhabitant and lies in the north of the municipality of Schmallenberg at a height of around 383 m on the Kreisstraße 38. The river Rarbach flows through the village. Sögtrop borders on the villages of Kirchrarbach, Landenbeck, Mönekind and Herhagen.

Sögtrop was first mentioned in 1225 in a document. The village used to belong to the municipality of Rarbach in Amt Fredeburg until the end of 1974.

== Gallery ==
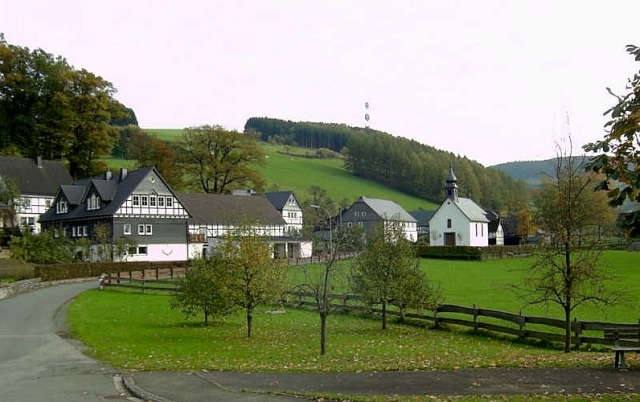
Sögtrop

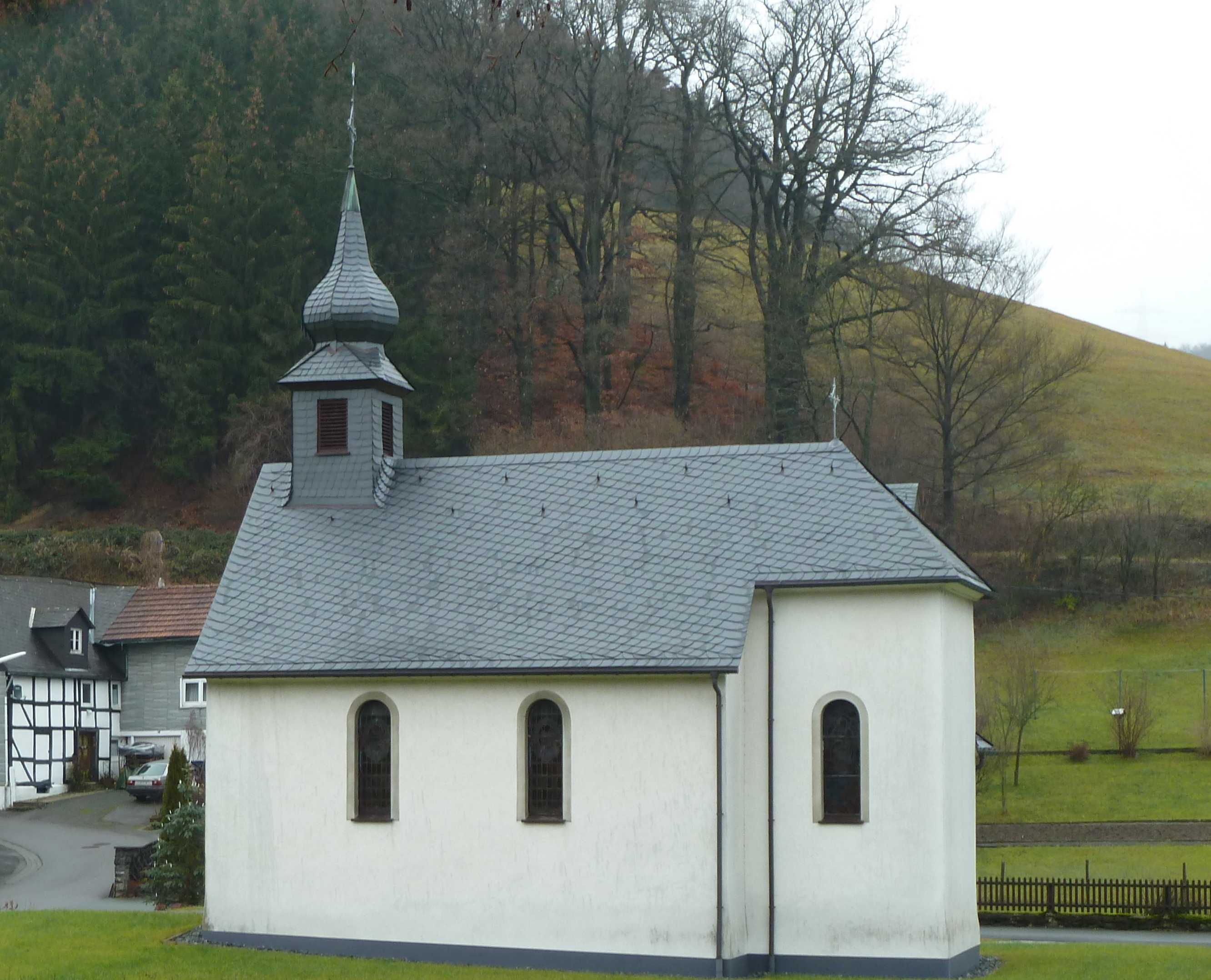
Chapel St. Blasius
