= Bödefeld =

- Stadtteil of Schmallenberg
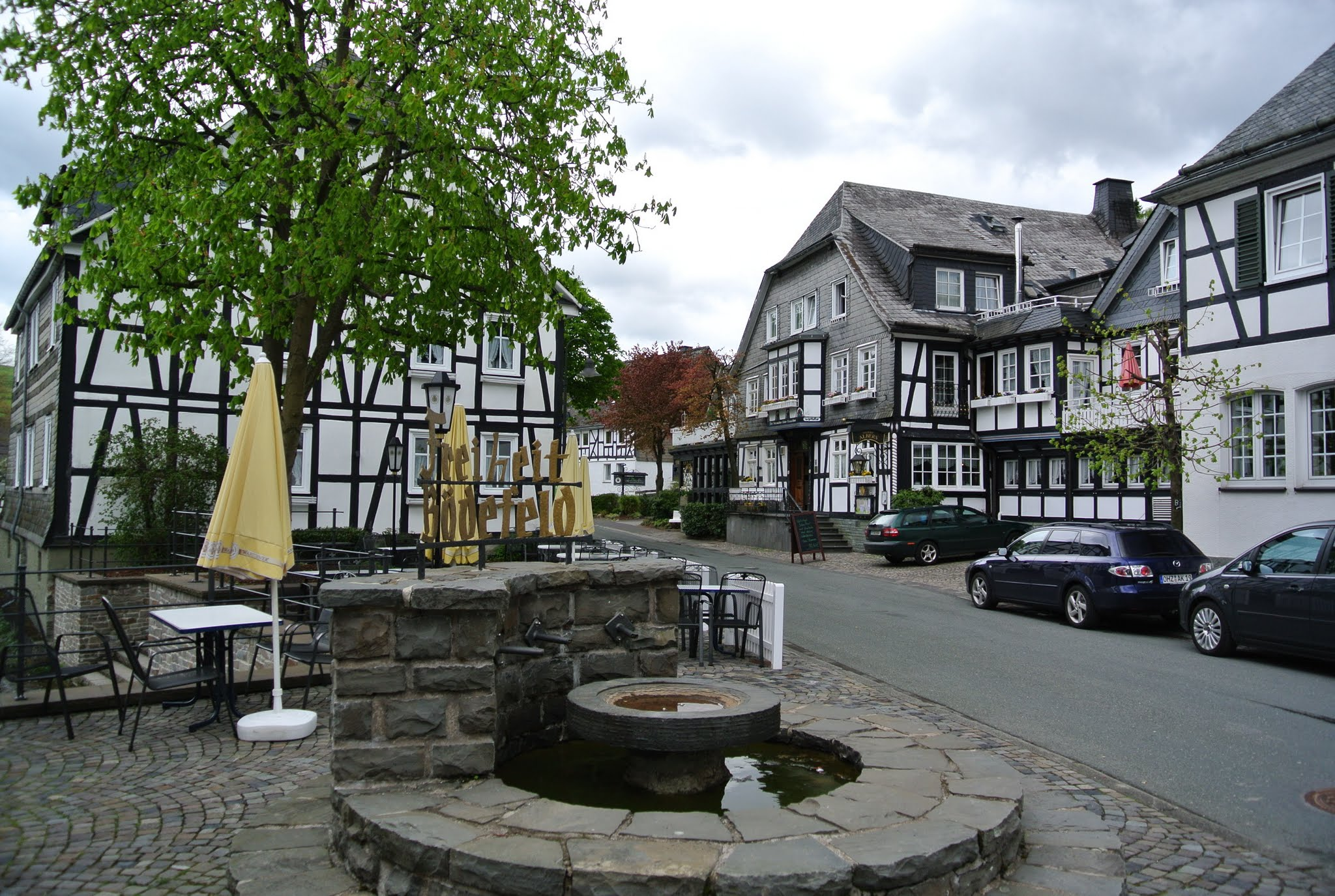

- Coat of arms
- Interactive map of Bödefeld
- Location within Germany Location within North Rhine-Westphalia
- Coordinates: 51°14′51″N 8°23′33″E
- Country: Germany
- State: North Rhine-Westphalia
- Admin. region: Arnsberg
- District: Hochsauerlandkreis
- Town: Schmallenberg

Population (2021-12-31)
  - Total: 1,102
- Time zone: UTC+01:00 (CET)
  - Summer (DST): UTC+02:00 (CEST)

Bödefeld is a village in the municipality Schmallenberg in the High Sauerland District in North Rhine-Westphalia, Germany.

The village has 1102 inhabitants and lies northeastern of the municipality of Schmallenberg at a height of around 488 m. The river Palme flows through the village. Bödefeld borders on the villages of Gellinghausen, Westernbödefeld, Brabecke, Osterwald, Obervalme (Bestwig), Lanfert, Hiege and Walbecke.

The village used to belong to the municipality of Freiheit Bödefeld in Amt Fredeburg until the end of 1974.

== Gallery ==
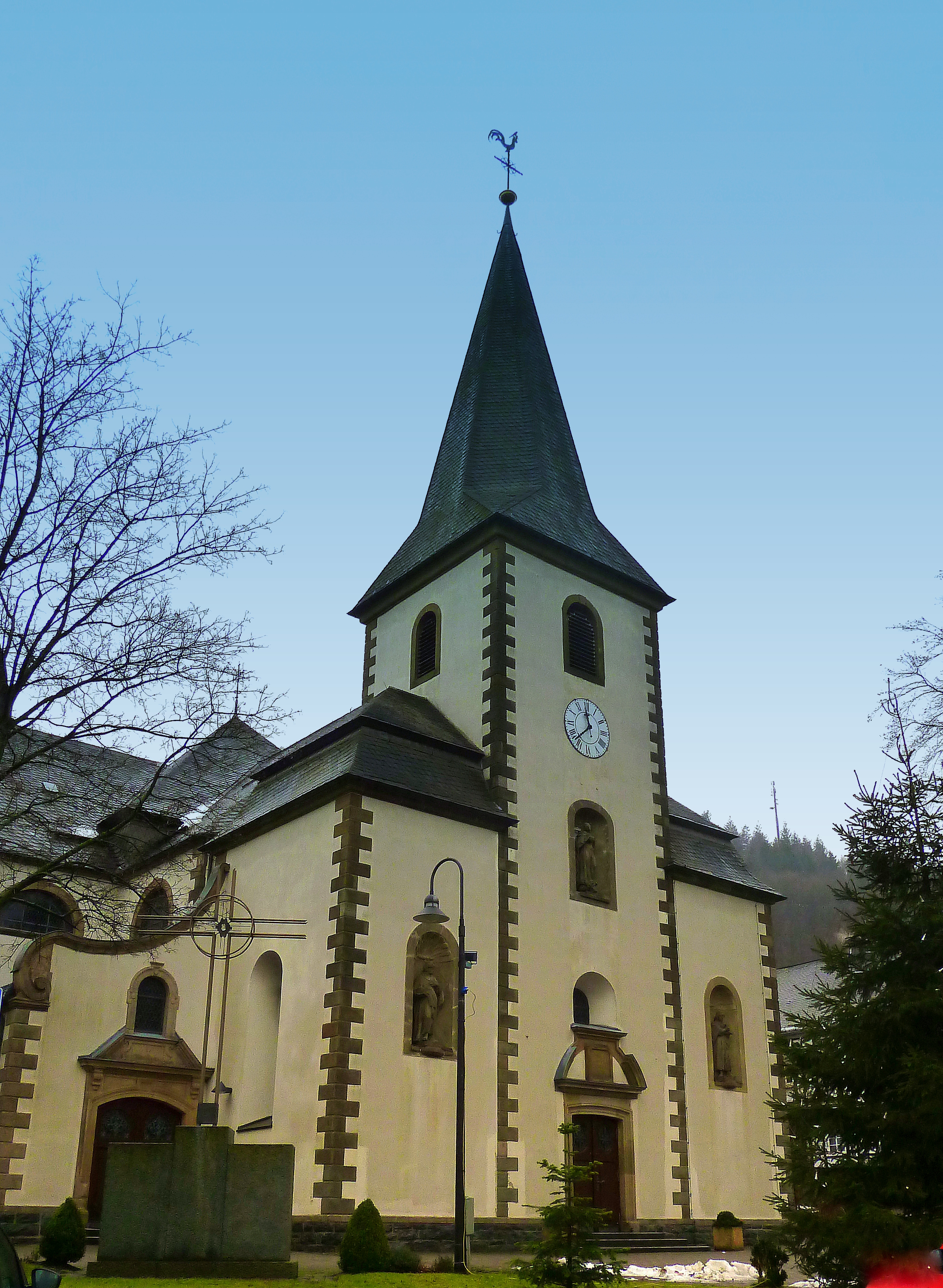
Saints Cosmas and Damian Church

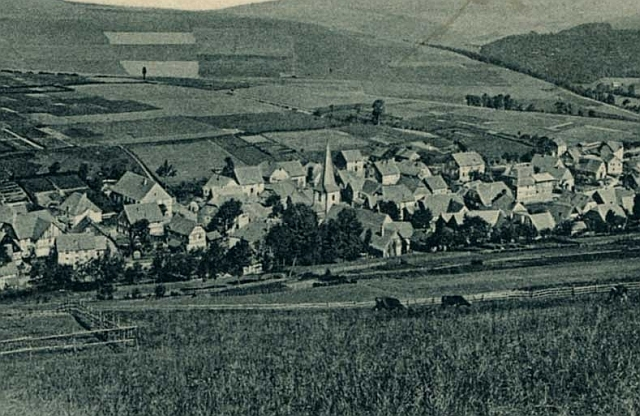
Bödefeld, 1905
