= Robert Henne House =

Historic house in Iowa, United States

- U.S. National Register of Historic Places
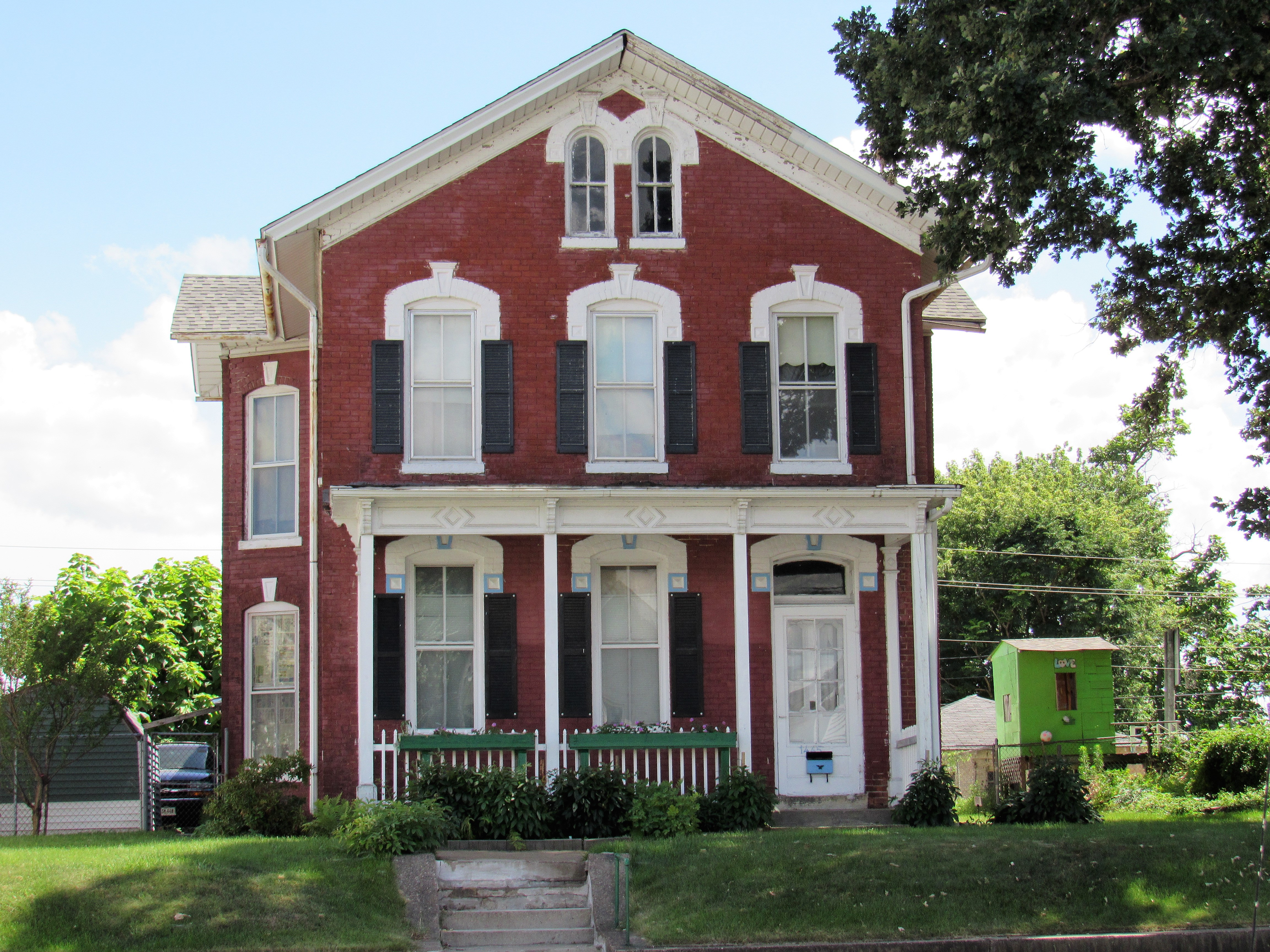

- Location within Iowa Location within the United States
- Location: 1445 W. 3rd St. Davenport, Iowa
- Coordinates: 41°31′20″N 90°35′45″W
- Area: less than one acre
- Built: 1874
- Architectural style: Greek Revival
- MPS: Davenport MRA
- NRHP reference No.: 83002445
- Added to NRHP: July 7, 1983

The Robert Henne House is a historic building located in the West End of Davenport, Iowa, United States. This Greek Revival style residence was built for Robert and Henrietta Henne in 1874. He operated the cigar stand in the post office. She continued the business after his death in 1885. The house followed a popular 19th-century style in Davenport that has some unique features. The gable-end oculus is located on the side of the house as opposed to the front. On the front are a pair of round-arch windows. The windows that face the front of the house feature keystone window heads that drop to small molded corner blocks and are flush to the brick. Molded panels are found on the porch frieze and on the soffits and reveals on the main entrance. The house has been listed on the National Register of Historic Places since 1983.
