= Steinbecke (Möhne) =

River in Germany

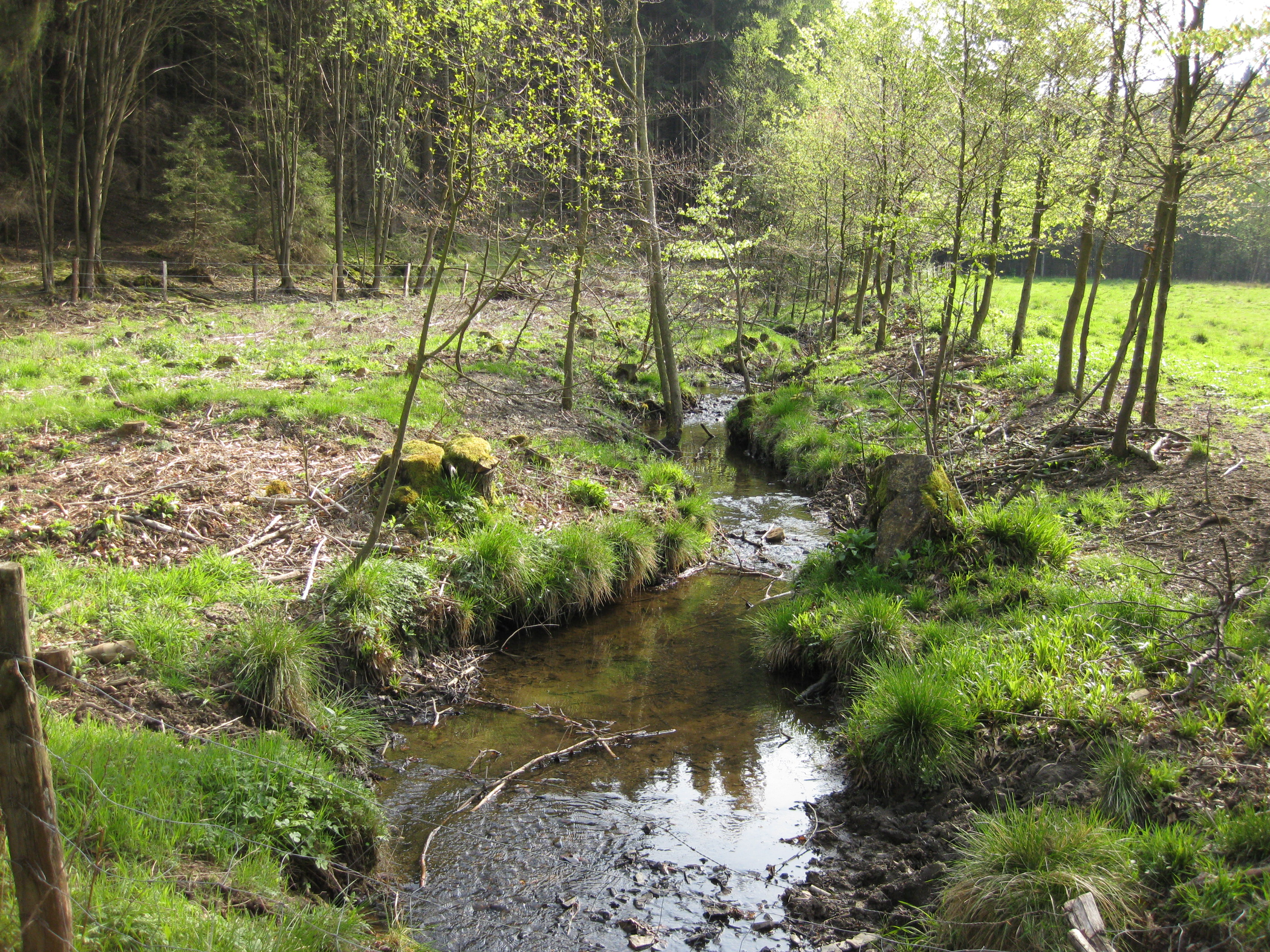

Location
- Country: Germany
- State: North Rhine-Westphalia

Physical characteristics
- Mouth
  - location: Möhne
  - coordinates: 51.4471°N 8.5448°E

Basin features
- Progression: Möhne→ Ruhr→ Rhine→ North Sea

Steinbecke is a small river of North Rhine-Westphalia, Germany. It is 3.1 km (1.9 mi) long and is a left tributary of the Möhne.

== See also ==
- List of rivers of North Rhine-Westphalia
