= Rarbach =

Small river in Sauerland area, Germany

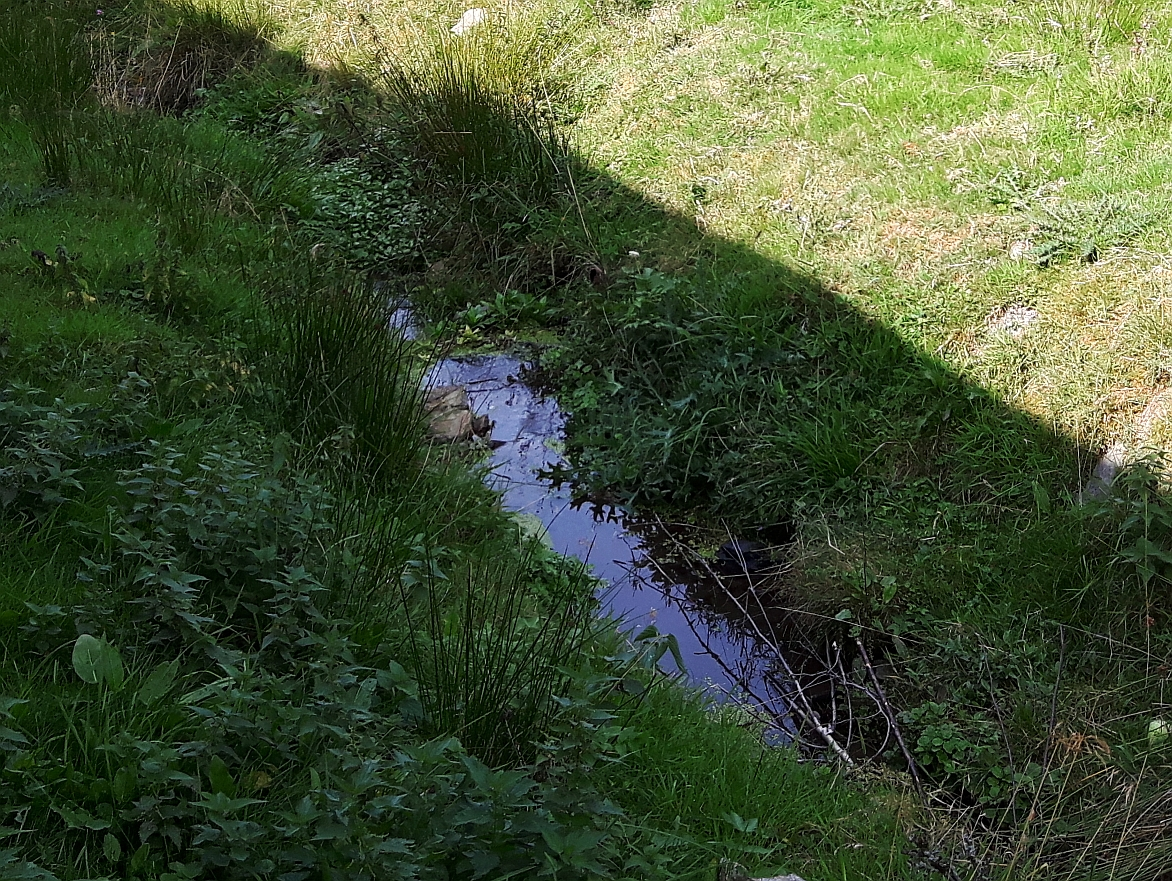

Location
- Country: Germany
- States: North Rhine-Westphalia

Physical characteristics
- Mouth
  - location: Henne
  - coordinates: 51.2667°N 8.2696°E

Basin features
- Progression: Henne→ Ruhr→ Rhine→ North Sea

Rarbach is a small river of North Rhine-Westphalia, Germany. It is 8.3 km (5.2 mi) long and flows as a right tributary into the Henne near Herhagen.

== See also ==
- List of rivers of North Rhine-Westphalia
