= Rimberg =

- Stadtteil of Schmallenberg
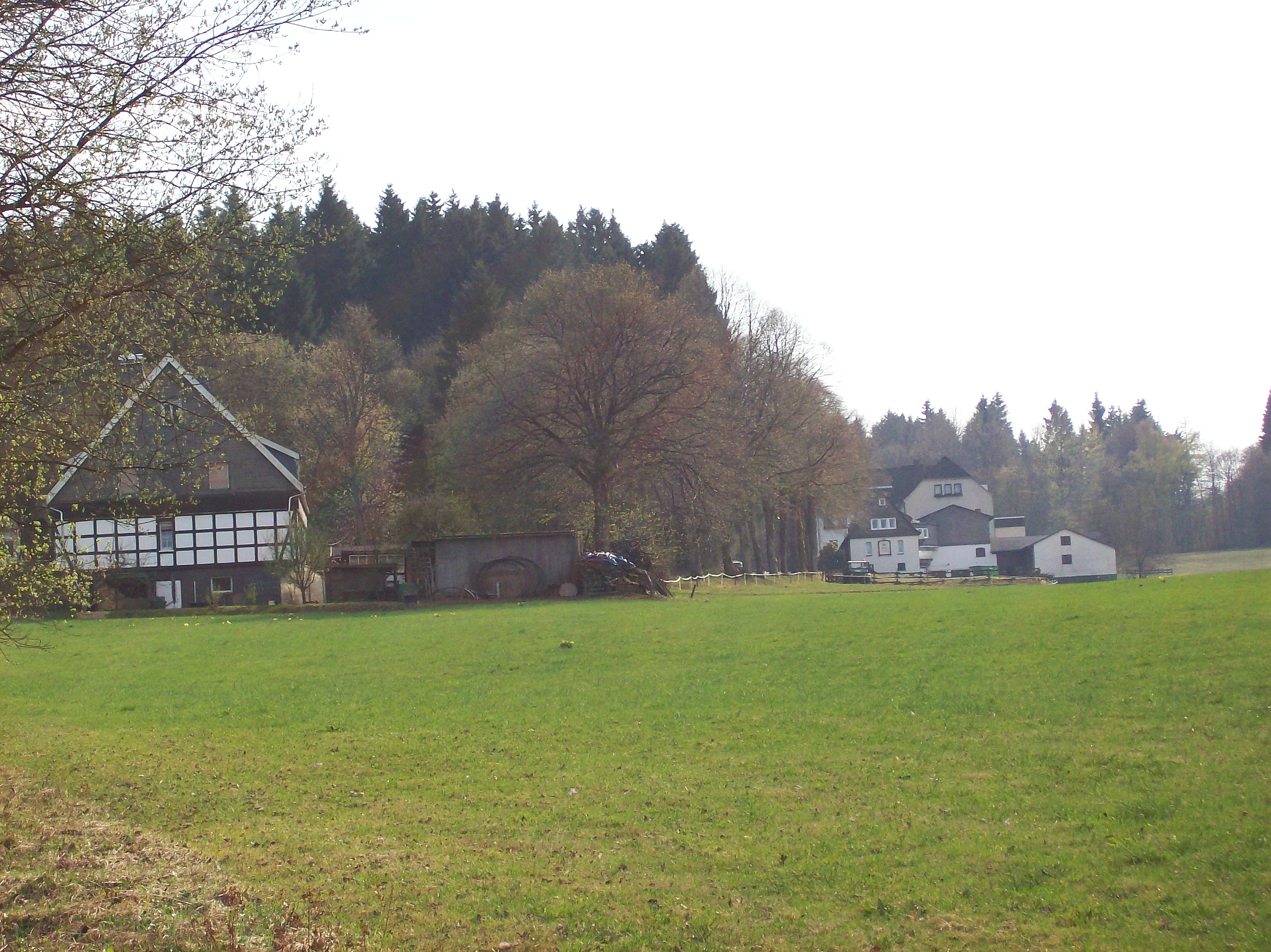
- Interactive map of Rimberg
- Location within Germany Location within North Rhine-Westphalia
- Coordinates: 51°13′3″N 8°20′57″E
- Country: Germany
- State: North Rhine-Westphalia
- Admin. region: Arnsberg
- District: Hochsauerlandkreis
- Town: Schmallenberg

Population (2021-12-31)
  - Total: 4
- Time zone: UTC+01:00 (CET)
  - Summer (DST): UTC+02:00 (CEST)

Rimberg is a locality in the municipality Schmallenberg in the district Hochsauerlandkreis in North Rhine-Westphalia, Germany.

The hamlet has 4 inhabitants and lies in the north of the municipality of Schmallenberg at a height of around 610 m. Rimberg borders on the villages of Sonderhof and Bad Fredeburg.

== Gallery ==
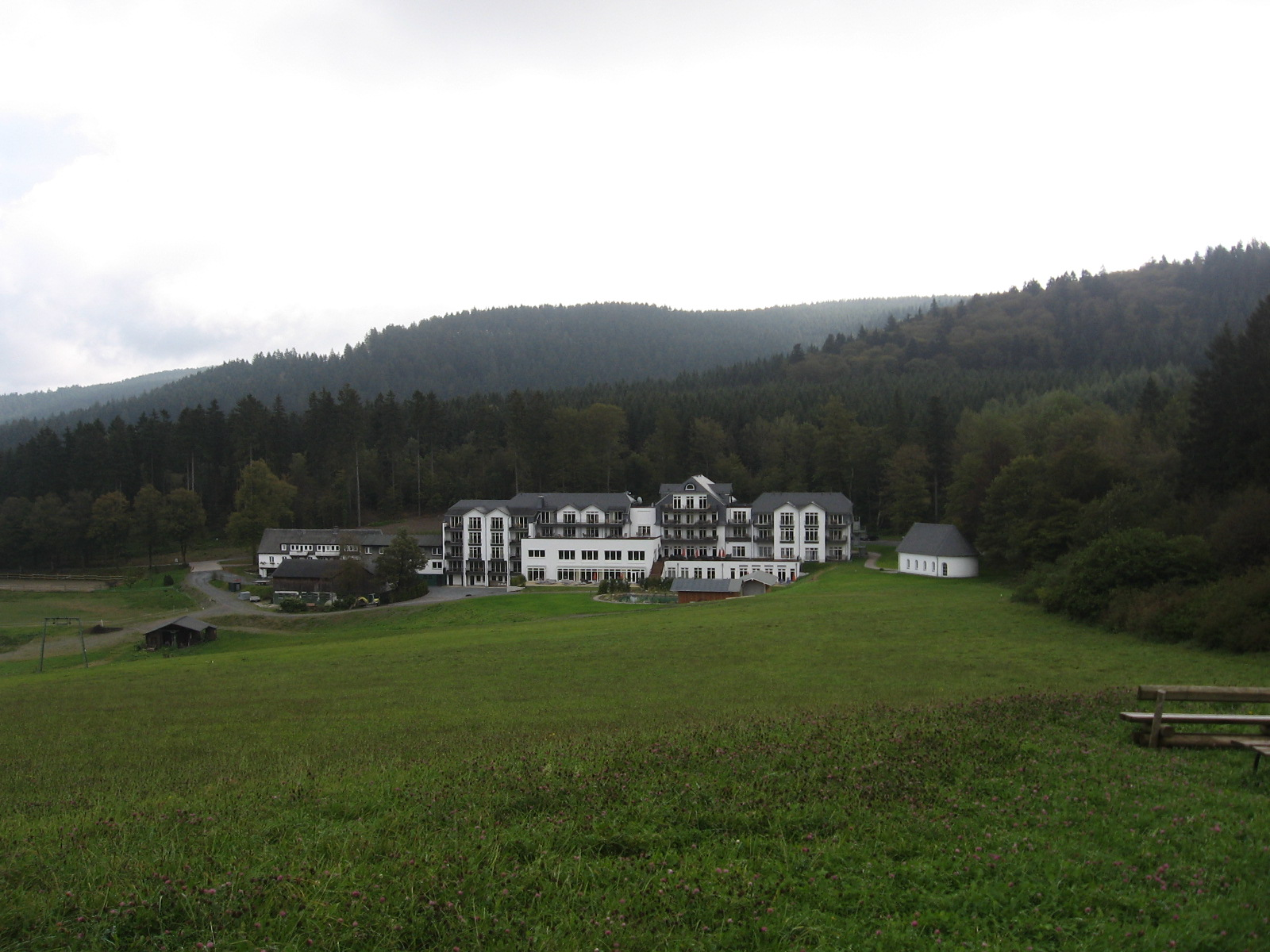
Hotel Rimberg

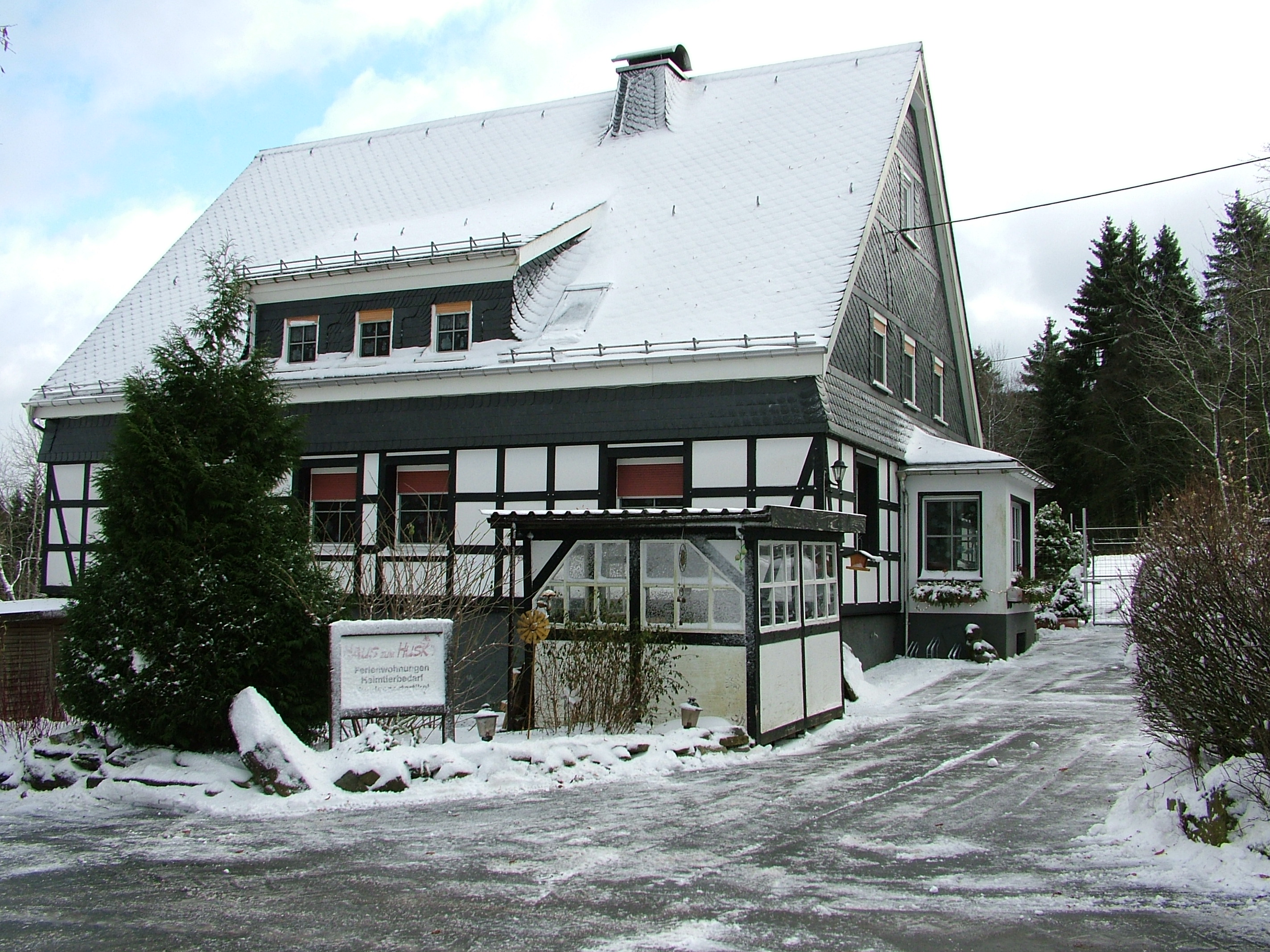
House No. 2

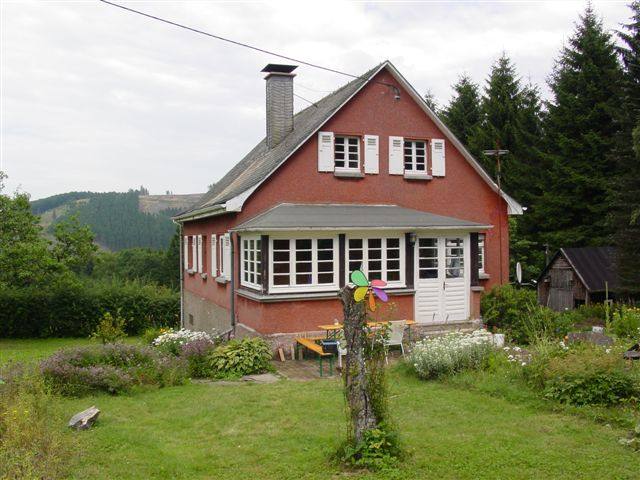
House No. 3
