= Josef Anton Henne =

Swiss historian and politician

Josef Anton Henne (known as Anton Henne; 22 July 1798 in Sargans – 22 November 1870 in Wolfhalden, Appenzell) was a Swiss historian and politician active during the formative phase of the modern Swiss state.

Henne's paternal grandparents had immigrated to Sargans from Allgäu, Bavaria. He entered Pfävers abbey at the age of 12 and became a novice at 17, but after a period of uncertainty, he left the monastery on 22 July 1817. He was further educated at Lucerne and at the universities of Heidelberg and Freiburg. In 1826 he became curator of the St. Gallen Abbey Library. In 1828, he published the first volume of a popular History of Switzerland (covering the period up to 1400). His aim was to present counter-position to the historiography of Heinrich Zschokke. An open exchange between Zschokke and Henne took place in 1830, after Zschokke in his journal Schweizerboten published a damning recension of the weekly Der Freimüthige edited by Henne from 1830 to 1838.

Henne was politically active in the formative years of the canton of St. Gallen, mediating between those requesting a pure direct democracy and those in favour of a pure representational democracy, introducing the compromise of the facultative referendum. Henne was president of the Catholic educational council from 1833, in which position he founded the journal Der Gärtner.

The second and third volumes of his History of Switzerland appeared in 1834 and 1835. In 1834, Henne took the post of professor of history and geography in a new Catholic high school which had been organized according to his ideals by the canton of St. Gallen. Over the following years, he studied early history, publishing a speculative treatise on the topic in 1837. Tensions with the Catholic political authorities escalated in 1841, and Henne lost his post at the cantonal school. He next took the post of professor of history at the newly founded University of Berne, where he remained until 1855. He published two volumes of a planned world history in nine volumes in 1845. Moving back to St. Gallen, he worked as librarian in the Abbey library until 1861.

Henne retired in June 1870 to Haslen in Appenzell, where he died in November of the same year.

== Bibliography ==
- Lieder und Sagen aus der Schweiz (1826, 2nd ed. 1827)
- Diviko und das Wunderhorn oder die Lemanschlacht (1826)
- Neue Schweizerchronik fürs Volk, (1828, 1834, 1835)
- Ansichten eines Obscuranten über Katholicismus und Protestantismus (1829)
- Offener Brief an Herrn Forst- und Kirchenrath Zschokke (1830)
- Die schweizerische Revolution von 1798 bis 1831 (1835)
- Die Faraone Aegyptens nach dem ägyptischen, assürischen, sikyonischen, argischen, attischen, kretischen, ilischen, thebischen und küprischen Kanon neu hergestellt (1837)
- Dr. Henne’s Vertreibung von der katholischen Kantonsschule in St. Gallen (1841)
- Allgemeine Geschichte von der Urzeit bis auf den heutigen Tag (1845)
- Geschichtliche Darstellung der kirchlichen Vorgänge in der katholischen Schweiz von 1830 bis auf unsere Tage (1854)
- Schweizergeschichte für Volk und Schule (1857)
- Klingenberger Chronk, wie sie Schodoler, Tschudi, Stumpf, Guilliman und Andere benutzten (1861
- Manethos, die Origines unserer Geschichte und Chronologie (1865)
