= Valme =

River in Germany

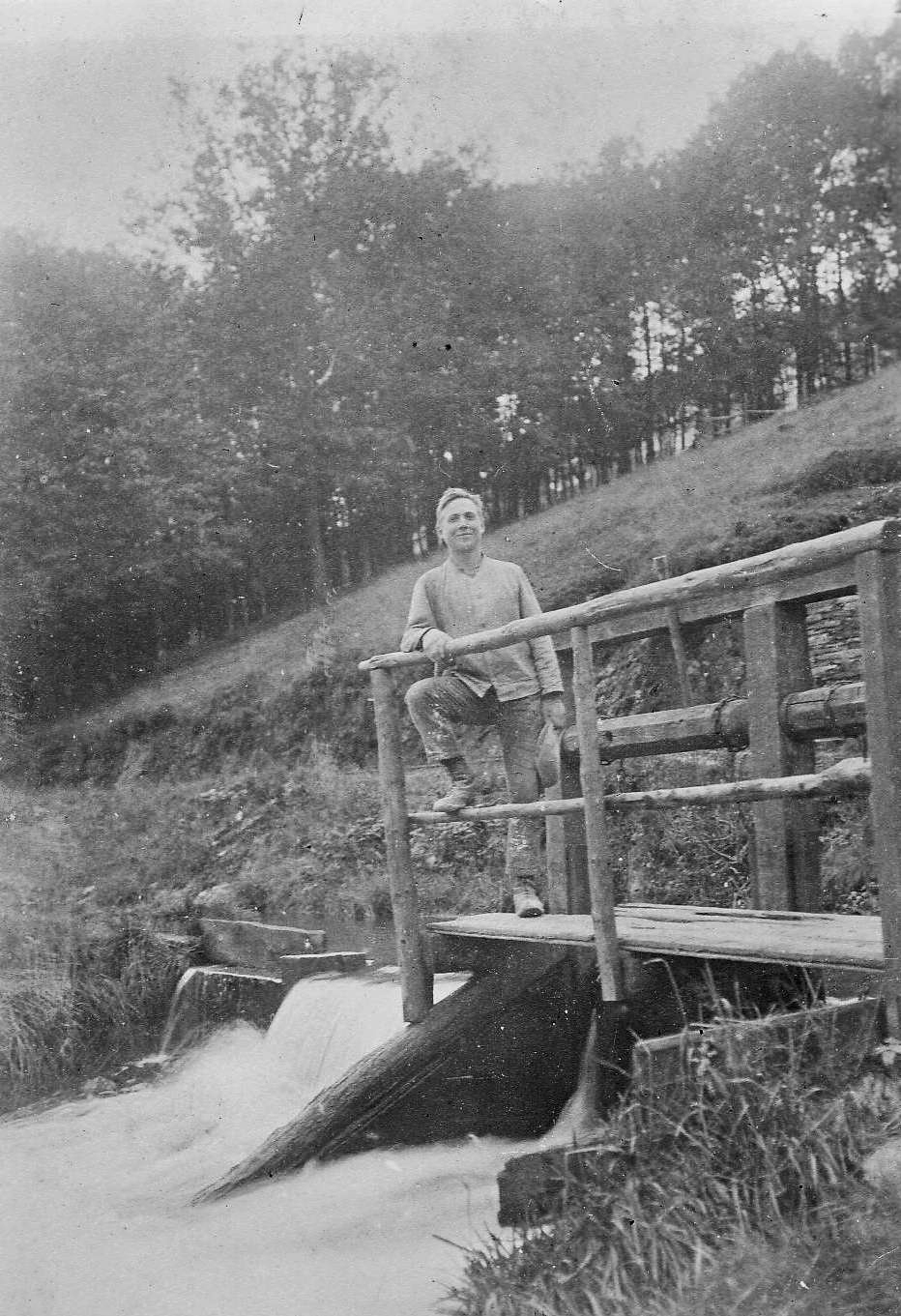

Location
- Country: Germany
- State: North Rhine-Westphalia

Physical characteristics
- Mouth
  - location: Ruhr
  - coordinates: 51.3638°N 8.3986°E
- Length: 19.7 km (12.2 mi)

Basin features
- Progression: Ruhr→ Rhine→ North Sea

Valme is a river of North Rhine-Westphalia, Germany. It flows into the Ruhr in Bestwig.

== See also ==
- List of rivers of North Rhine-Westphalia
