= WTJZ =

WTJZ may refer to:

- WTJZ (AM), a radio station (1110 AM) licensed to Norfolk, Virginia, United States
- WPMH, a radio station (1270 AM) licensed to Newport News, Virginia, United States, which held the call sign WTJZ from 1979 to 2021
- WJFV, a radio station (1650 AM) licensed to Portsmouth, Virginia, United States, which held the call sign WTJZ from 2021 to 2022
