= Bermecke =

Bermecke may refer to three different rivers of North Rhine-Westphalia, Germany:

- Bermecke (Heve), drained by the Bache/Lottmannshardbach, Heve, Möhne
  - Lütte Bermecke, right tributary of the Bermecke (Heve)
- Bermecke (Möhne), left tributary of the Möhne
