= Wak =

Wak or WAK may refer to:

- Vehicle number plate code for Wartburgkreis, Germany
- WAK (Kevin A Williams) (born 1965), Chicago artist
- Wak Chanil Ajaw, Maya princess circa 682 AD

== See also ==
- El Wak (disambiguation)
- Waks (disambiguation)
- Waq (disambiguation)
- Wack (disambiguation)
- WAC (disambiguation)
- Wakwak, a mythical creature
- Wāḳwāḳ, a legendary island
