= Waks =

Waks or WAKS may refer to:

== People ==
- Aesha Waks, American actress
- Leonard J. Waks (born 1942), American philosopher
- Manny Waks (born 1976), Australian activist
- Mosze Waks (Michał Waszyński, 1904–1965), Polish film director and producer
- Nathan Waks (born 1951), Australian cellist, composer

== Radio Stations ==
- WAKS, a radio station (96.5 FM) licensed to Akron, Ohio, United States, which has carried the WAKS callsign since 2001
- WCPN, a radio station (104.9 FM) licensed to Lorain, Ohio, United States, which carried the WAKS callsign from 1999 to 2001
- WKDD, a radio station (98.1 FM) currently licensed to Munroe Falls, Ohio, United States, which briefly carried the WAKS callsign while licensed to Canton, Ohio, United States in 2001
- WXKB, a radio station (103.9 FM) licensed to Cape Coral, Florida, United States, which carried the WAKS callsign from 1990 to 1993
- WMTX, a radio station (100.7 FM) licensed to Tampa, Florida, United States, which carried the WAKS callsign from 1998 to 1999

== See also ==
- Wak (disambiguation)
- Wachs
- Wax (disambiguation)
