= Wacker =

Wacker may refer to:

== People ==
- Wacker von Wackenfels
- The Whacker, poker player Garry Bush's nickname
- Wacker (surname)
- Wacker, a colloquial term for an inhabitant of Wirral, England; a partial synonym for "scouser"

== Places ==
- Wacker (Heve), a river of North Rhine-Westphalia, Germany
- Wacker, Illinois, an unincorporated community in Carroll County, Illinois, United States
- Wacker Township, McPherson County, South Dakota, United States
- Ward Cove, Alaska, United States, also called Wacker, an unincorporated community in Ketchikan Gateway Borough
- Wacker Drive, a street in Chicago, Illinois, United States

== Companies ==
- Wacker Chemie, Munich, Germany
- Wacker Neuson, Munich, Germany

== Sports ==
=== Austria ===
- FC Admira Wacker Mödling, a football club from Mödling
- FC Wacker Innsbruck, a defunct association football club from Innsbruck
- FC Wacker Innsbruck (2002), an existing association football club from Innsbruck

=== Germany ===
- Wacker 04 Berlin, a former football club based in Berlin
- Wacker Bernburg, a former association football club from Bernburg, Saxony
- FC Wacker Biberach, a former association football club from Biberach an der Riß, Baden-Württemberg, that has merged with another club to FV Biberach
- SV Wacker Burghausen, a football club based in Burghausen, Bavaria
  - Wacker-Arena, their stadium
  - SV Wacker Burghausen II a defunct football club, reserve team of SV Wacker Burghausen
- Wacker Leipzig, a defunct association football club playing in Leipzig
- FC Wacker München, an association football club based in the Sendling borough of Munich
- FSV Wacker 90 Nordhausen, an association football club from Nordhausen, Thuringia
- FSV Wacker 03 Gotha, an association football club from Gotha, Thuringia

=== Switzerland ===
- Wacker Thun, a team handball club from Thun

== Other uses ==
- Wacker process, a chemical reaction
- Vibrating plate compactor, a construction tool
- The Wackers, an American rock band based in Montreal, Canada.
- The Wackers (TV series), 1975 British sitcom created by Vince Powell

== See also ==
- Wack (disambiguation)
