= Wach (disambiguation) =

Wach is a village in east-central Poland.

Wach or WACH may also refer to:

- WACH, a Fox television affiliate in Columbia, South Carolina
- Wach (surname)
- a former radio station in Newport News, Virginia; see WACH-TV (Virginia)

== See also ==
- Wachs
