= Jane Roland Martin =

American philosopher (born 1929)

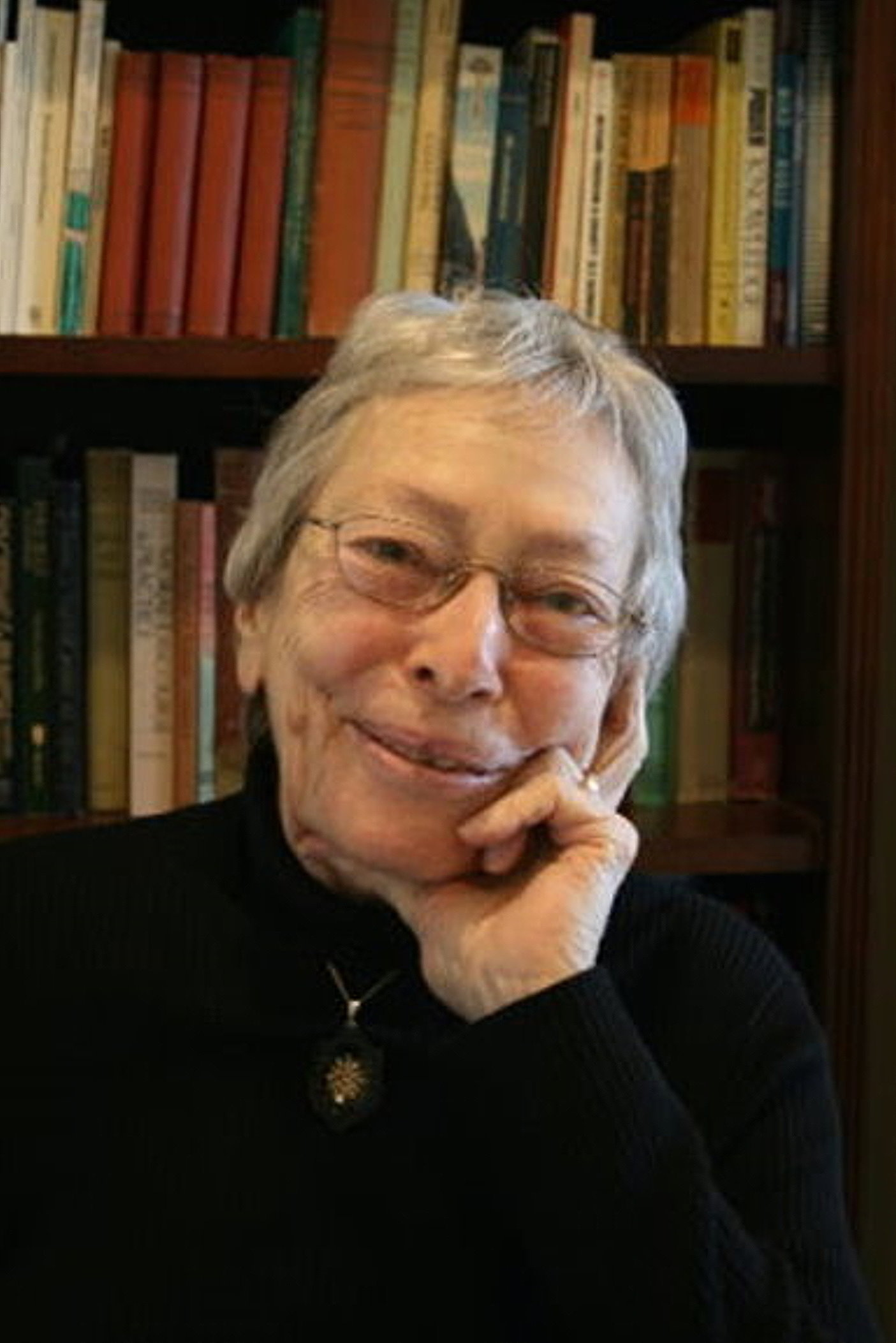
- Portrait, by Charles Ketcham, of Jane Roland Martin (July 20, 1929-), feminist philosopher of education, Professor Emerita of Philosophy at the University of Massachusetts, Boston. CC 4.0 rights granted by Joyce Ketcham.
- Born: July 20, 1929 (age 97); New York City, New York, United States
- Awards: Guggenheim Fellowship (1987)

Philosophical work
- Era: Contemporary philosophy
- Region: Western philosophy
- School: Analytic philosophy, Feminist philosophy
- Institutions: University of Massachusetts Boston
- Main interests: Feminism, Philosophy of education

Jane Roland Martin (born July 20, 1929) is an American philosopher known for her work on philosophy of education—specifically, her consideration of gender-related issues in education, on which she has written extensively. Martin is Professor Emerita of Philosophy at the University of Massachusetts Boston.

In her entry on Martin for Fifty Modern Thinkers on Education: From Piaget to the Present, Susan Laird writes, "Martin is an internationally renowned philosopher whose inquiry in and about education has shaken its conceptual foundations, showing them to be deeply and consequentially gendered. For she has theorized a hidden curriculum of gender embedded in the ideal of the educated person and in basic concepts of teaching, schooling and education itself, often assumed to be gender-blind. As remedies, she has proposed a new gender-sensitive educational ideal, re-conceptualized schooling, urged activism for academic transformation, and recommended public acknowledgement of multiple educational agency, with a view to preservation of a broadly conceived cultural wealth."

Writing in Philosophy Now, Judith Suissa cited Martin as one of a vanguard of "contemporary feminist philosophers of education" who "have addressed the way the predominant ideal of the educated person, for hundreds of years, excluded traits, functions, and values traditionally associated with women."

Gloria Steinem writes, in her foreword to Martin's Coming of Age in Academe, "Jane Roland Martin brings us together to think about the energy being wasted on an old game, and the possibilities if those energies were set free."

== Early life ==
Martin was born in 1929, in New York City. "My mother was a school teacher (homemaking) at the Elizabeth Barrett Browning Jr. High School in the Bronx," she recalled in a 2007 interview. Her mother "had a lot of teacher friends," she said, "and often complained about '110 Livingston Street' (the address of the New York Board of Education) and the corruption and meanness of the 'system.'" Martin's father was a reporter for the Journal American.

Martin attended the Little Red Schoolhouse in New York City's Greenwich Village, "then a patchworked neighborhood made of working-class homes," notes Randall Everett Allsup in his review of Martin's philosophical memoir, School Was Our Life. Founded on Deweyite principles by the education reformer Elisabeth Irwin, the Schoolhouse was an independent progressive school. "In the early twentieth century, 'Little Red' was one of several grand experiments in universal public schooling–like the Francis W. Parker School in Chicago, Carmelita Hinton’s Putney School in Vermont, or the Marietta Johnson Organic School of Education in Fairhope, Alabama–all aimed at democratizing education and teaching for citizenship," writes Allsup. Such schools embraced the cornerstone assumptions of Dewey's “New Education” movement, emphasizing "free activity" over "external discipline" and "learning through experience" over "learning from texts and teachers."

Martin's years at the school had a profound impact on her as a student and, ultimately, philosopher of education and feminist critic of the gendered assumptions (and outright sexism) permeating conventional approaches in the field. "They wanted it to be a model for public schools, with low tuition, large classes, a wide range of students, and an anti-racist curriculum," she told an interviewer. "It was heaven! ... It was a very formative experience for me and everyone else who went there." The Schoolhouse gave her a front-row seat to the early days of the progressive education movement, "later defined as constructivist, whole-child, or student-centered teaching/learning" (Allsup). Some of the movement's foundational assumptions would shape her philosophy of education.

== Education ==
Martin took her AB degree at Radcliffe College in 1951. She went on to complete her master's degree in education at Harvard University in 1956 and in 1961 her Doctor of Philosophy degree at Radcliffe.

While at Harvard, she took a course in analytic philosophy taught by Israel Scheffler; it inspired her passion for philosophy, especially the application of analytic philosophy to education. "After college, I taught first at a private, then at a public school, for a total of three years," she recalled, in an interview with Leonard J. Waks. "While teaching, I enrolled for a master’s degree at the Harvard School of Education ... [W]hen I had one course left to go, a good friend told me to take a course with Israel Scheffler, because 'analytic philosophy is the key to everything!'"

The class was life-changing, inspiring her to pursue a doctorate in the subject. "At the time, I was teaching fifth grade and I was totally disillusioned with the school situation," she told Waks.

My complaint was the curriculum, the “lock step” public school curriculum. I wasn’t allowed to teach the smarter kids more. I would go home and try to revise the curriculum but I realized that I needed to know more in order to do so in any meaningful way. But before I knew it, I had been sufficiently transformed into an analytical philosopher that I couldn’t even remember that I had ever wanted to reform the curriculum. My “new self” only wanted to understand the logic of historical explanation! At about that time, Scheffler’s The Language of Education came out. And there it was: A teaches B to C. I had “found” myself.

== Career ==
Martin joined the philosophy department at the University of Massachusetts Boston in 1972. Though she regarded herself as a feminist, "philosophy of education and feminism remained two separate, parallel worlds for me," she later observed. "I was a feminist and a philosopher, but not a feminist philosopher. Then, "one semester in the late 1970s," she was scheduled to teach a course on the philosophy of history but it was undersubscribed. "And so I said, 'Okay, I’ll teach the philosophy and feminism course.' And I never looked back." She spent her academic life at UMass Boston with the exception of 1996–1997, when she was a visiting professor at the Harvard University Graduate School of Education. She retired in 1992.

== Overview of Scholarly Work ==
Explaining, Understanding, & Teaching (New York: McGraw-Hill, 1970)

Steeped in analytic philosophy's attention to linguistic issues, Explaining, Understanding, & Teaching is, as Martin notes in her introduction, an "essay in the philosophy of education" that grew out of her doctoral dissertation. The book "constitutes an inquiry into explaining something to someone and the understanding at which that explaining aims," Martin writes, "and also into the various roles in which explaining and understanding play in education in general and teaching in particular."

Readings in the Philosophy of Education: A Study of Curriculum, ed. Jane R. Martin (Boston: Allyn and Bacon, 1970).

"As the civil rights, peace, and women's movements captured the attention of US campuses and as the free school movement flourished in the 1970s, Martin's inquiry began to focus on the logic of curriculum," Susan Laird observes, in her entry on Martin in Fifty Modern Thinkers on Education: Piaget to the Present. "What should be the relationship between the disciplines and curriculum? What justifies a 'god-given subject' or 'immutable basic'? What is the anatomy of a proper school subject? What part should student choice play in curriculum, and should it be left to chance? What is 'hidden curriculum'?"

As Laird goes on to note, Martin's analysis led, inevitably, to a pointed critique of the "dogmatic assumptions undergirding the ideal of a liberal education and its most conservative advocates' objections to interdisciplinary fields such as social studies, Black studies, and women's studies." In the '70's, she turned her attention to "'the real-life problems of education' philosophically," writes Laird. "In so doing, she showed that philosophical inquiry on curriculum need not be epistemological, as [was] often then assumed, for significant ethical, social, and political curriculum questions frequently arise as well."

Reclaiming a Conversation: The Ideal of the Educated Woman (New Haven: Yale University Press, 1985).

Martin has been outspoken about the sexism that, during her early years in academe, barred the door to the inner sanctums of philosophy, then as now very much a boys' club. "So long as I could 'pass' as an analytical philosopher, I was 'one of the boys,'" she told an interviewer. "But I wasn’t really one of the boys. The fact that I was a woman made it a whole different ball game. ... [A]nalytical philosophy of education, like philosophy itself, was a male culture. Almost all the individuals were men. The men invited one another to their campuses to give seminars and lectures, but they never invited me. I wondered why not and whether there was something wrong with me. And the work itself, the subject matter discussed, was gendered... There were many topics you just didn’t talk about, like those related to domestic life," dismissed by male academics as only of interest to women and therefore mundane or trivial by definition.

Martin's trailblazing research on women and education, begun in 1980, upended such sexist assumptions and had a profound influence on philosophy of education. "Challenging philosophers and educators to take women's educational experiences and contributions seriously and to question their own longstanding assumptions about gender, she challenged them also to rethink the meaning of education itself, as well as their analytic approach," Susan Laird asserts, in Fifty Modern Thinkers on Education. "Her boldly activist presidency of the Philosophy of Education Society marked a major turning point in the field's history in 1981. Martin first presented her new research on women with her frequently cited and republished presidential address, 'The Ideal of the Educated Person,' which critiqued analytic philosopher R.S. Peters' allegedly gender-neutral account of this ideal...".

Predictably, Martin's challenges to patriarchal orthodoxies "sparked acrimonious controversy, especially among analytic philosophers of education," notes Laird. In Reclaiming a Conversation, Martin responded to her critics. According to Laird, "Her first research on women had identified an epistemological inequality in contemporary analytic philosophy of education that excluded, distorted, and devalued women as subjects and objects of educational thought. She had documented contemporary analytic philosophers' neglect even of classics (by both men and women) from the history of thought about women's educational activities. Furthermore, Martin had shown that such neglect was consequential, insofar as it led contemporary philosophers of education not only to exclude women, but also to rule questions about child-rearing out of bounds to the field."

"Aiming to correct epistemological inequality then evident in analytic philosophy of education," Reclaiming a Conversation was "paradigm-shifting for the field," says Laird, who calls it "the first major late-modern study of educational thought whose subjects and objects included women."

The Schoolhome: Rethinking School for Changing Families (Cambridge: Harvard University Press, 1992)

"Re-interpreting Maria Montessori's 'casa dei bambini' and critiquing William James' 'Moral Equivalent of War' whileciting myriad sources from both popular and high culture, this book radically re-conceptualized school as a 'moral equivalent of home' for both 'learning to live' and learning about dominated and dominating cultures," writes Susan Laird, in Fifty Modern Thinkers on Education: From Piaget to the Present. "Faulting the epistemological fallacy that reduces curriculum to mere 'spectator' knowledge, it also deployed Aristotle's golden mean to re-theorize gender-sensitivity. Moreover, it called for consciousness-raising about a miseducative phenomenon she named domephobia, a morbid fear and repressive hatred of things domestic that infects both culture and education in the United States to the detriment of women's and children's well-being."

Changing the Educational Landscape: Philosophy, Women and Curriculum (New York: Routledge, 1994)

A highly influential anthology of Martin's articles, Changing the Educational Landscape includes her "paradigm-shifting critique of epistemological inequality in philosophy of education and its concept of the educated person as well as her conceptual analysis of hidden curriculum" (Laird, Fifty Modern Thinkers on Education: From Piaget to the Present).

Coming of Age in Academe: Rekindling Women's Hopes and Reforming the academy (New York: Routledge, 2000)

Coming of Age in Academe considers the ways in which "the second-class status of education itself as a profession and field of study reflects an 'education-gender system' in higher education," notes Susan Laird, in Fifty Modern Thinkers on Education: From Piaget to the Present. "Comparing academic women to immigrants assimilated into the United States over the past two centuries, Martin critiques various academic practices that perpetuate the academy's estrangement from women's lived experience and especially from ghettoized 'women's' occupations, including teaching." Martin advocates "dismantling the education-gender system through 'actions great and small,' 'both strategic and outrageous,'" and exhorts "liberal-arts faculty 'to think across the disciplines and across college lines in order to make common cause with scholars on education, nursing, and social-work faculties.'"

Cultural Miseducation: Toward a Democratic Solution (New York: Teacher's College Press, 2002).

Here, Martin theorizes in greater depth the notion of a “cultural wealth” curriculum, which she introduced in her 1995 DeGarmo Lecture (published as “There’s too much to teach: Cultural wealth in an age of scarcity,” Educational Researcher 25, 2, 1996, 4–10, 16) and elaborated in her 1996 John Dewey Lecture, “Cultural Miseducation: In Search of a Democratic Solution.”

In a 2007 interview, Martin explained the "miseducation" of the book's title: "From a social policy perspective it is important to recognize that education can be harmful, so that we are motivated to take some kind of preventive action. There is so much that is miseducative in the culture, even forgetting for the moment about bad schools, TV, the Internet, and computer games—these are educational agents that pass down cultural liabilities to children and people of all ages."

Educational Metamorphoses: Personal Transformations and Culture Crossings (Lanham: Rowman & Littlefield, 2007).

"I had been gathering the case studies I use in Educational Metamorphoses for almost 30 years and I decided to see if I could ... write these up," Martin recalled, in an interview. "Before I knew it, I was writing a serious book on education. ... Educational Metamorphoses focuses on individuals who undergo transformational change, [while leaving] open the question of how, exactly, to combine individual and cultural perspectives" even as it "points toward the answer." Her next book, Education Reconfigured, would delve into that answer, she said, arguing "that both the individual and the culture are involved in every educational interaction, and in every educational interaction, both the individual and the culture change."

Education Reconfigured: Culture, Encounter, and Change (New York: Routledge, 2011).

In Education Reconfigured, Martin "puts forward a unified theory that casts education in a brand new light," according to the publisher's descriptive blurb. "Martin’s 'theory of education as encounter' places culture alongside the individual at the heart of the educational process, thus responding to the call John Dewey made over a century ago for an enlarged outlook on education. Look through her theory’s lens and you can see that education takes place not only in school but at home, on the street, in the mall—everywhere and all the time. Look through that lens and you can see that education does not always spell improvement; rather, it can be for the better or the worse. Indeed, you can see that education is inevitably a maker and shaper of both individuals and cultures."

Reviewing the book for the professional journal Educational Theory, Clarence W. Joldersma highlights Martin's attention to "cultural transmission," which in her analysis plays a profound role in education. Yet the philosophy of education has historically diminished or dismissed it entirely, she argues. This has partly to do, she asserts, with "a nature/culture divide," which conceives of the learner in Cartesian terms, as a rational, disembodied mind as opposed to an embodied being, and a "two-sphere split" that patrols the border between civic and domestic, public and personal. As a result, she contends, the philosophy of education has a huge blind spot when it comes to forms of education, such as "cultural transmission," that take place outside schools.

School Was Our Life: Remembering Progressive Education (Indianapolis: Indiana University Press, 2018).

In School Was Our Life, Martin relies on her recollections as well as those of her former classmates to retrospectively analyze their early, formative educational experiences, in the late 1930s and early 1940s, at Elisabeth Irwin's Little Red School House in New York City. "Little Red," as Martin and her interviewees fondly recall it, was a proving ground for progressive education in the United States and, as Sondra Wieland Howe notes in her review of the book for the Journal of Historical Research in Music Education, "iconic in that movement."

Elaborating on the movement, Howe writes, "The progressive education philosophy of Little Red was a reaction against the traditional schooling of New York City’s public schools. Irwin’s book of the 1920s, Fitting the School to the Child, refuted the idea that the child had to conform to the school; rather the school should be conforming to the child. ... John Dewey, Francis W. Parker, and other members of the progressive movement wanted a sound education for as many children as possible, rejecting nineteenth-century methods of drill, tests, and memorization. Little Red, located in Greenwich Village, a neighborhood in New York City known as an artists’ haven, had children of all economic classes."

In their late eighties at the time of the interviews, Martin's classmates "can still sing the songs they learned in elementary school and credit the progressive education they loved with shaping their outlooks and life trajectories," writes Howe. Martin "frames these stories from the former students ... with philosophical commentary, bringing to light the underpinnings of the kind of progressive education employed at Little Red and commenting critically on the endeavor. In a time when the role of the arts in education and public schooling itself are under attack in the United States, Martin makes a case for a different style of education designed for the defense of democracy and expresses hope that an education like hers can become an opportunity for all."

== Recognition (Awards, Fellowships, Professional Honors) ==
In 1987, Martin received a Guggenheim Award for her work, in 2013 the John Dewey Society's Outstanding Achievement Award, and in 2016 a MacDowell Fellowship. At MacDowell, she worked "on an analytic educational memoir," according to her biography on the MacDowell website, "written from the dual standpoint of the schoolchild she was when she graduated from the 8th grade of The Little Red Schoolhouse in Greenwich Village in 1943 and the philosopher she became when she received her Ph.D. in 1961 from Harvard/Radcliffe." The resulting book, School Was Our Life: Remembering Progressive Education, was published by Indiana University Press in 2018.

In addition, Martin is the recipient of honorary doctorates from the University of Umeå in Umeå, Sweden (1995) and Salem State College, Salem, MA (1993). In 1991, she was the Society for Women in Philosophy's Distinguished Woman Philosopher honoree. From 1980 to 1981, she served as president of the Philosophy of Education Society.

== Influence ==
D.G. Mulcahy, a professor of education, has published a book-length analysis of Martin's work, Knowledge, Gender, and Schooling: The Feminist Educational Thought of Jane Roland Martin (Westport, CT: Bergin & Garvey, 2002). In addition, he discusses Martin's theory of liberal education, comparing and contrasting it with those of Cardinal Newman and Mortimer Adler, in The Educated Person: Toward a New Paradigm for Liberal Education (Lanham, MD: Rowman & Littlefield, 2008).

"She has been a dominant figure in philosophy of education for almost half a century," observed Leonard J. Waks, himself a philosopher of education, in a 2007 issue of Education & Culture. "Most will associate [her] with the introduction of hotly contested issues related to the education of women, and of feminist themes and methods, into philosophy of education during the 1980s. Older readers, however, may still think of [Martin] as one of the pioneer analytical philosophers of education." In the 1950s and early 1960s, he notes, "philosophical analysis was a radical innovation in philosophy of education, and one no more welcomed by the old guard than feminism was in the early 1980s." Waks characterizes Martin's work as "marked by a rare combination of analytical precision, philosophical imagination, social responsibility, and natural charm." As a result, he notes, it "has deservedly reached a wide audience and has influenced the selection and treatment of many topics taken up by others for further study.”

== Personal life ==
In 1962, after graduating from Radcliffe, Martin married Michael Lou Martin, a fellow graduate student who would go on to become a philosopher of science and professor in the Philosophy Department at Boston University (1965–1996). Michael Martin died in 2015, at the age of 83, from complications related to Parkinson's disease. An obituary in the Integrated History and Philosophy of Science newsletter noted that his interests sometimes overlapped with his wife's: "His 1972 book, Concepts of Science Education: A Philosophical Analysis, was the first English-language book to address philosophical issues in science education." They had two sons.

== Bibliography ==
- Preserving Planet Earth: Changing Human Culture with Lessons from the Past. New York: Routledge, 2024 (forthcoming).
- Education Reconfigured: Culture, Encounter, and Change. New York: Routledge, 2011.
- Educational Metamorphoses: Philosophical Reflections on Identity and Culture. Lanham, MD: Rowman & Littlefield, 2007.
- Cultural Miseducation: In Search of a Democratic Solution. New York: Teachers College Press, 2002.
- Coming of Age in Academe: Rekindling Women's Hopes and Reforming the Academy. New York: Routledge, 2000.
- Changing the Educational Landscape: Philosophy, Women, and Curriculum. New York: Routledge, 1994.
- The Schoolhome: Rethinking Schools for Changing Families. Cambridge, MA: Harvard University Press, 1992.
- Reclaiming a Conversation: The Ideal of the Educated Woman. New Haven: Yale University Press, 1985.
- Readings in the Philosophy of Education: A Study of Curriculum. Ed. Jane R. Martin. Boston: Allyn and Bacon, 1970.
- Explaining, Understanding, & Teaching. New York: McGraw-Hill, 1970.

Articles by Martin

- "The Path Not Taken," Journal of Philosophy of Education, Volume 54, Issue 3, June 2020, 744–756.
- “Education Writ Large,” in Education and the Making of a Democratic People (Boulder: Paradigm Publishers, 2008), ed. John I. Goodlad, Roger Soder, and Bonnie McDaniel.
- "Climbing the Ivory Walls: Women in Academia" in Sisterhood is Forever (New York: Washington Square Press, 2003), ed. Robin Morgan.
- "Aerial Distance, Esotericism, and Other Closely Related Traps," Signs, 21 (1996), 584–614.
- "Methodological Essentialism, False Difference, and Other Dangerous Traps," Signs, 19 (1994), 630–657.
- "Science in a Different Style," American Philosophical Quarterly, 25 (1988), 129–140.
- "Becoming Educated: A Journey of Alienation or Integration?" Journal of Education, Fall 1985.
- "Excluding Women from the Educational Realm," Harvard Educational Review, 52 (1982), 133–148.
- "Two Dogmas of Curriculum," Synthese, 51 (1982), 5-20.
- "The Ideal of the Educated Person," Educational Theory, 32 (1981), 97–109.
- "Needed: A Paradigm for Liberal Education," in Philosophy and Education 1981 (Chicago: National Society for the Study of Education), ed. Jonas Soltis, Chapter III.
- "What Should We Do with a Hidden Curriculum When We Find One?," Curriculum Inquiry (1976), 135–151.
- "Basic Actions and Simple Actions," American Philosophical Quarterly (1971), 59–68.
- "The Disciplines and the Curriculum," Educational Philosophy and Theory (1969), 23–40.
- "Another Look at the Doctrine of Verstehen," British Journal for the Philosophy of Science (1969), 53–6.
- "On the Reduction of 'Knowing That' to 'Knowing How'," in Language and Concepts in Education (Chicago: Rand McNally, 1961), ed. B.O.Smith and R.H.Ennis.
- "On 'Knowing How' and 'Knowing That'," The Philosophical Review (1958), 379–387.

== Interviews ==
Print interviews

- Zan Boag, "Why School Must Change," New Philosopher, June 20, 2016.

TV/video interviews

- "CSU professor Daniel Mulcahy speaks with Jane Roland Martin at Central Connecticut State University."

Podcast interviews

- Eric Thomas Weber and Anthony Cashio, "School Was Our Life," Philosophy Breaks Bread, episode 88, December 5, 2019.
