= Wack =

Wack or Whack may refer to:

== People ==
- Gerhard Wack (born 1945), German politician
- Henry Wack (1875–1955), attorney, author, and apologist for Leopold II's misrule of the Congo Free State
- Pierre Wack (1922–1997), a French oil executive who was the first to develop the use of scenario planning in the private sector
- Tierra Whack (born 1995), an American rapper, singer, and songwriter

== Arts, entertainment, and media ==
- WACK, a radio station in Newark, New York
- WACK! Art and the Feminist Revolution, a feminist art exhibition and book
- Whack, a short-lived St. John Publications comic book (1953–1954)
- Whack Records
- WACK, a Japanese music production company

== Other uses ==
- Backslash symbol "\", sometimes known as a whack

== See also ==
- WAC (disambiguation)
- Whac-A-Mole, an arcade game
- Wacke, or greywacke, a type of sandstone
- Wacker (disambiguation)
- Wak (disambiguation)
- Wank (disambiguation)
