= Schottmecke =

River in Germany

Location
- Country: Germany
- States: North Rhine-Westphalia

Physical characteristics
- Mouth
  - location: Heve
  - coordinates: 51.4247°N 8.2831°E

Basin features
- Progression: Heve→ Möhne→ Ruhr→ Rhine→ North Sea

Schottmecke is a small river of North Rhine-Westphalia, Germany. It is 0.9 km (0.6 mi) long and flows into the Bache (the upper course of the Heve) in Hirschberg.

== See also ==
- List of rivers of North Rhine-Westphalia
