= Kleine Schmalenau =

River in Germany

Coordinates: 51.4643°N 8.0983°E

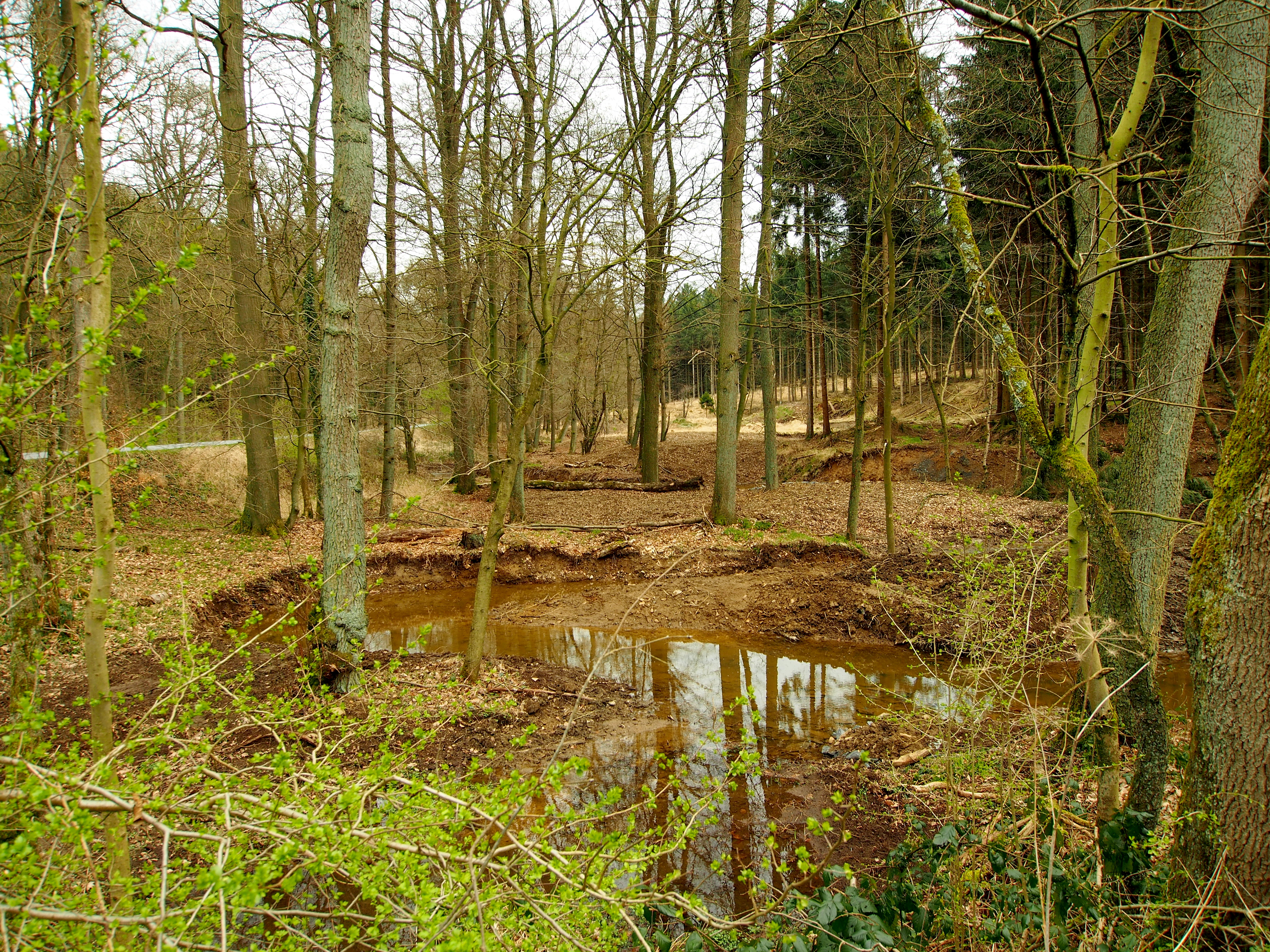

Location
- Country: Germany
- State: North Rhine-Westphalia

Physical characteristics
- Mouth
  - location: Heve
- Length: 10.6 km (6.6 mi)

Basin features
- Progression: Heve→ Möhne→ Ruhr→ Rhine→ North Sea

Kleine Schmalenau is a river of North Rhine-Westphalia, Germany. It is a left tributary of the Heve.

== See also ==
- List of rivers of North Rhine-Westphalia
