= Höbecke =

River in Germany

Location
- Country: Germany
- States: North Rhine-Westphalia

Physical characteristics
- Mouth
  - location: Bermecke
  - coordinates: 51.4324°N 8.5433°E

Basin features
- Progression: Bermecke→ Möhne→ Ruhr→ Rhine→ North Sea

Höbecke is a small river of North Rhine-Westphalia, Germany. It is 1.7 km long and flows into the Bermecke near Brilon.

== See also ==
- List of rivers of North Rhine-Westphalia
