= William A. Reid =

William A. Reid may refer to:

- William Allan Reid (1865-1952), British Conservative party politician
- William Arbuckle Reid (born 1933), British curriculum theorist
- William Reid (basketball) (1893-1955), American basketball coach and administrator
- William Reid (musician) (born 1958), guitarist with The Jesus and Mary Chain
