= Große Schmalenau =

River in Germany

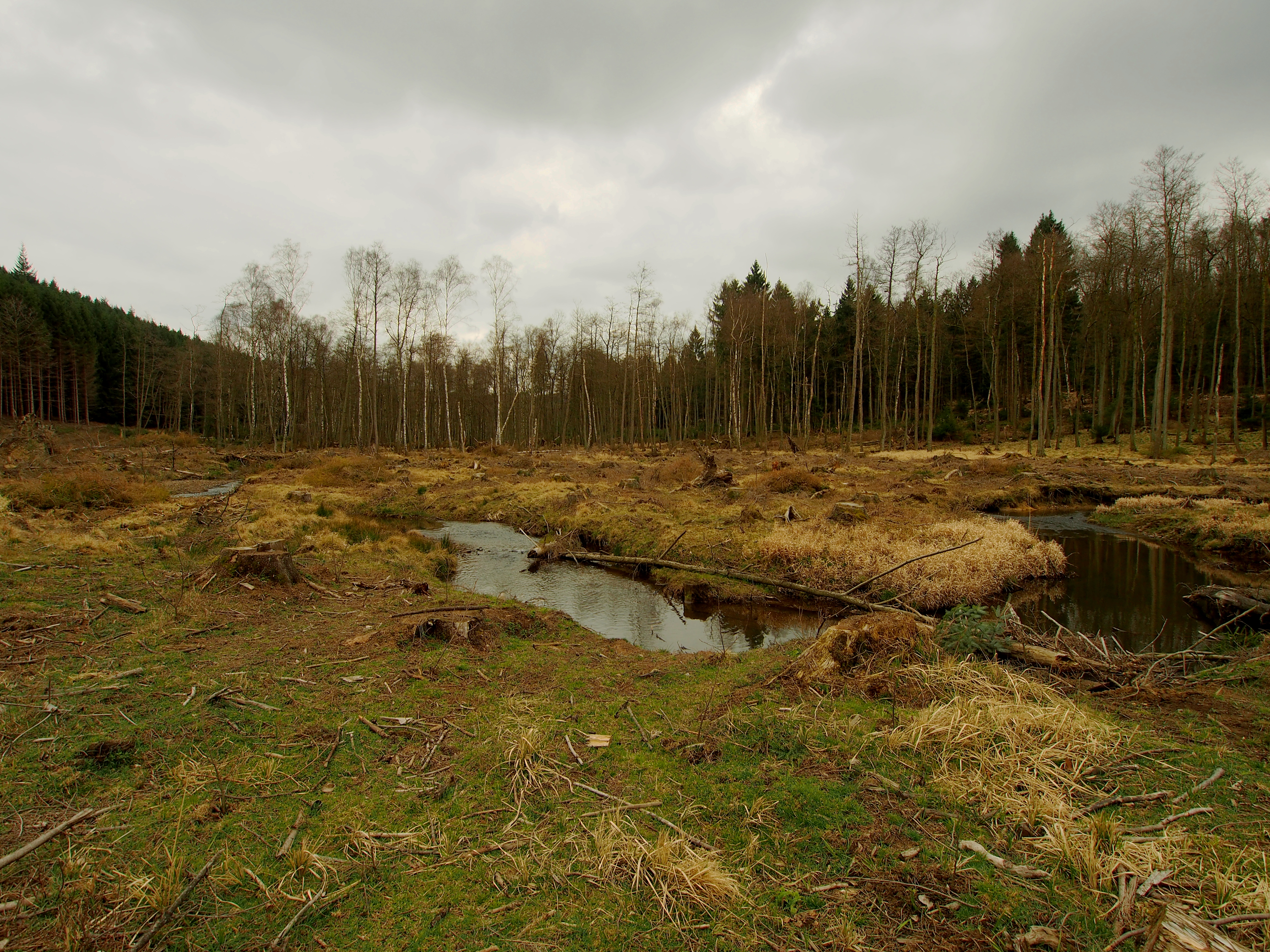

Location
- Country: Germany
- State: North Rhine-Westphalia

Physical characteristics
- Mouth
  - location: Heve
  - coordinates: 51.4546°N 8.1561°E
- Length: 12.3 km (7.6 mi)

Basin features
- Progression: Heve→ Möhne→ Ruhr→ Rhine→ North Sea

Große Schmalenau is a river of North Rhine-Westphalia, Germany. It flows into the Heve in Möhnesee-Neuhaus.

== See also ==
- List of rivers of North Rhine-Westphalia
