= WACS =

WACS may refer to:

- WACS-TV, television station (channel 7, virtual 25) licensed to Dawson, Georgia, United States
- West Africa Cable System, communications cable
- West African College of Surgeons, a professional organisation
- Westminster Abbey Choir School, British school for the education of boy choristers
- The What a Cartoon! Show, anthology series on Cartoon Network
- White Alice Communications System, US Air Force communications system
- World Affairs Council of Seattle, non-profit, non-partisan organization
- World Association of Chefs' Societies, global network of chefs associations

== See also ==
- WACs, members of the Women's Army Corps (WAC)
- WAC (disambiguation)
