= WJFV =

Conservative talk radio station in Portsmouth, Virginia

- Portsmouth, Virginia; United States
- Broadcast area: Hampton Roads
- Frequency: 1650 kHz

Programming
- Language: English
- Format: Conservative talk radio
- Affiliations: Genesis Communications Network; Pittsburgh Steelers Radio Network; Townhall News; Virginia Cavaliers; Westwood One

Ownership
- Owner: Chesapeake–Portsmouth Broadcasting Corporation
- Operator: John Fredericks
- Sister stations: WPMH

History
- First air date: March 1, 1999
- Former call signs: WAWT (1998); WHKT (1998–2021); WTJZ (2021–2022)
- Call sign meaning: John Fredericks – Virginia (operator and state)

Technical information
- Licensing authority: FCC
- Facility ID: 87170
- Class: B
- Power: 10,000 watts (day); 1,000 watts (night)
- Transmitter coordinates: 36°48′10″N 76°16′58″W

Links
- Public license information: Public file; LMS
- Webcast: Listen live
- Website: www.wjfvradio.com

WJFV (1650 kHz) is a commercial AM radio station licensed to Portsmouth, Virginia, and serving Hampton Roads. It broadcasts a conservative talk radio format and is owned by the Chesapeake–Portsmouth Broadcasting Corporation. The radio studios are on Brightwood Avenue in Richmond.

WJFV operates fulltime with a non-directional antenna. By day, it transmits 10,000 watts, but to protect other stations on 1650 AM from interference, at night it reduces power to 1,000 watts. The transmitter site is off Barnes Road in Chesapeake, Virginia, near Interstate 464.

== Programming ==
Weekdays begin with station operator John Fredericks hosting a news and interview morning drive time show. The rest of the weekday schedule is made up of syndicated shows from Mark Levin, Steven K. Bannon, Dave Ramsey, Rita Cosby, Rob Carson and Red Eye Radio.

Weekends include The Car Doctor, Rob Anannian, Free Talk Live and Todd Starnes, as well as repeats of weekday shows. Most hours begin with an update from Townhall News.

== History ==
=== Expanded Band assignment ===
This station originated as the expanded band "twin" of an existing station on the standard AM band. On March 17, 1997, the Federal Communications Commission (FCC) announced that 88 stations had been given permission to move to newly available "Expanded Band" transmitting frequencies, ranging from 1610 to 1700 kHz. with WPMH in Portsmouth, Virginia, authorized to move from 1010 to 1650 kHz. A construction permit for the expanded band station was assigned the call sign WAWT on January 9, 1998. The call sign was changed to WHKT the next month. WHKT signed on the air on March 1, 1999, broadcasting a news/talk and sports radio format under the branding "The Big Kat".

The FCC's initial policy was that both the original station and its expanded band counterpart could operate simultaneously for up to five years, after which owners would have to turn in one of the two licenses, depending on whether they preferred the new assignment or elected to remain on the original frequency. However, this deadline was extended multiple times, and both stations remained authorized. One restriction is that the FCC has generally required paired original and expanded band stations to remain under common ownership. The "parent" station on 1010 AM, now WHKT, was deleted on January 3, 2024.

=== Radio Disney ===
On December 12, 2001, the station switched to the Radio Disney network with a children's/contemporary hit radio format. Radio Disney aired on WBVA and WVAB until November, when the two stations dropped the format over contractual issues relating to the ABC Radio Networks trying to buy the station. WHKT was acquired by The Walt Disney Company, adding it to the Radio Disney network.

On January 25, 2010, The Walt Disney Company announced that it was selling the station to Hampton Roads-area religious station owner Chesapeake-Portsmouth Broadcasting for $350,000. In the interim, Disney took WHKT, and five other Radio Disney stations slated to be sold, off the air. The station went silent on January 22. The sale was listed as "consummated" by the FCC as of May 5.

=== Urban gospel ===
On February 14, 2018, the station dropped its conservative talk radio "The Answer" format. It flipped to a mix of urban gospel and Christian talk and teaching. It used the moniker "Praise 104.9", also heard on WTJZ (1270 AM) and translators W245CK and W285FM.

WHKT and WTJZ exchanged call signs on November 5, 2021, with the call sign WTJZ moving from AM 1270 to AM 1650, and WHKT transferred from AM 1650 to AM 1270. The WTJZ call sign referred to "Tidewater Jazz", which had been adopted at AM 1270 in 1979.

=== Conservative talk ===
In August 2022, WTJZ returned to a conservative talk format. The previous "Praise 104.9" urban gospel format was moved to then-WKQA (1110 AM).

On October 11, 2022, AM 1650's call sign was changed to WJFV, standing for the name of the operator and morning host, John Fredericks, and the state of Virginia. This in turn allowed the station on AM 1110 to change its call sign from WKQA to WTJZ on November 2.
