= William Arbuckle Reid =

British educator (1933–2015)

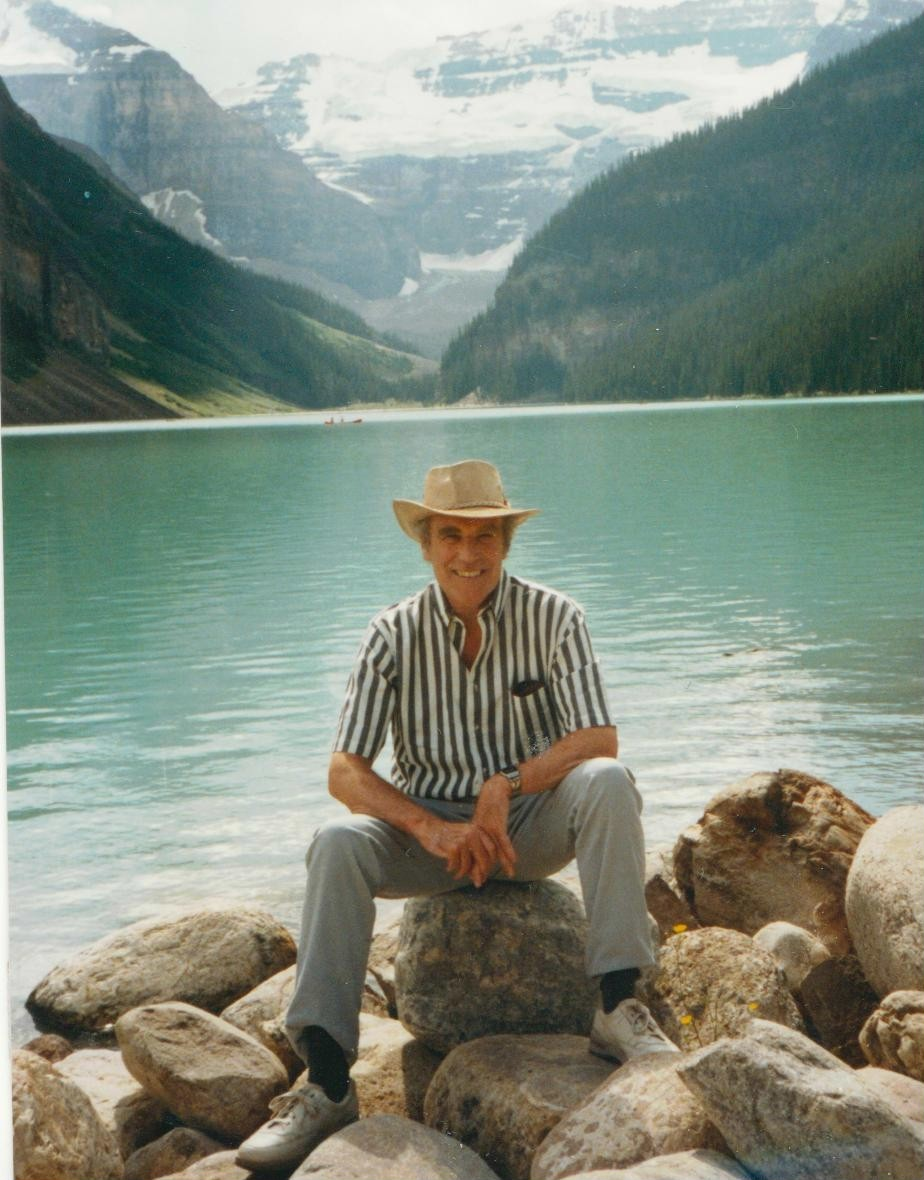
- Reid in 1989

William Arbuckle "Bill" Reid (1933 – 2 September 2015) was a British curriculum theorist.

Born in Gloucestershire, Reid obtained his BA degree in languages from Cambridge University, after which he taught in English high schools. He went on to conduct curriculum research at the University of Birmingham, where he obtained his PhD and subsequently taught MEd students. He took early retirement from the University of Birmingham in 1988 and was appointed as a visiting professor at the London Institute of Education, and subsequently the University of Texas, Austin. He also undertook collaborative projects with colleagues at the University of Oslo and taught summer schools at the University of Victoria, British Columbia. Some of his reminiscences were published in 2009 in "Leaders in Curriculum Studies", edited by E.C. Short and Leonard J. Waks (Sense Publishers, Rotterdam, 2009). In retirement he self-published pamphlets and books concerning archaeology and other local history in his native Cotswold landscape, as well as memoirs, articles on chess, books of poems and a novel. A series of articles published in "Glevensis", a journal of the Gloucestershire Archaeological Society were formed into a self-published book (Chantry Press; Windmill Print and Graphics) entitled "From Roman to Saxon in a Cotswold Landscape" (2006).

Reid's major academic works elaborated on curriculum theorist Joseph Schwab's notion of "curriculum deliberation". He was the author of numerous scholarly articles and several books, and was a regular contributor to the Journal of Curriculum Studies of which he was European Editor from 1975 to 1983 and General Editor from 1986 until the mid-1990s. He regularly presented papers at the annual meetings of the American Education Research Association. Reid had a penetrating grasp of the nature of learning and a deep understanding of the link between theory and classroom realities - an approach both philosophical and practical. Few writers in the field combined his intellectual edge with a solid perspective on teaching and a readiness to address complex issues. In 2007 his article "Strange Curricula: Origins and Development of the Institutional Categories of Schooling" (JCS 22, 203 (1990)) was selected as one of the seminal articles that had appeared in the Journal of Curriculum Studies in the previous 25 years.

In 2014 Reid moved to Nottingham to be close to his family and he died there in September 2015.

== Selection of Articles ==
- "Curriculum as Institutionalized Learning: Implications for Theory and Research", Journal of Curriculum and Supervision, Fall 2003, Volume 19, Number 1, Pages 29-43
- "Curriculum, Community, and Liberal Education: A Response to the Practical 4", Curriculum Inquiry, Vol. 14, No. 1 (Spring, 1984), pp. 103–111

== Books ==
- Curriculum as Institution and Practice: Essays in the Deliberative Tradition (1999)
- William Arbuckle Reid; J. Wesley Null, eds. (1994). The Pursuit of Curriculum. Iap. ISBN 978-1-59311-507-4. (reprint IAP, 2006, ISBN 978-1-59311-507-4)
- (With J. L. Filby) "The Sixth: an Essay in Democracy and Education", Lewes, Falmer Press, 1982
- Thinking about the Curriculum: The Nature and Treatment of Curriculum Problems (Routledge and Kegan Paul, 1978); reprinted 2013.
- William Arbuckle Reid; Decker F. Walker, eds. (1975). Case Studies in Curriculum Change: Great Britain and the United States. Routledge. ISBN 978-0-7100-8037-0. "William Arbuckle Reid."
- Philip Hampson Taylor; William Arbuckle Reid; Brian Holley (1974). The English sixth form: a case study in curriculum research. Taylor & Francis. ISBN 978-0-7100-7832-2.
- (with P. H. Taylor, B. J. Holley and G. Exon ) "Purpose, Power and Constraint in the Primary School Curriculum", Basingstoke, Macmillan, 1974

== Reviews ==
In Curriculum as Institution and Practice: Essays in the Deliberative Tradition, William Reid acknowledges curriculum studies' debt to this Deweyan model of deliberation. He asserts that science's ascendancy in curriculum planning at the turn of the century relegated philosophical deliberation to an inferior position but that Dewey's works "kept the tradition alive"
