= WTJZ (AM) =

- Norfolk, Virginia; United States
- Broadcast area: Hampton Roads
- Frequency: 1110 kHz
- Branding: Praise 104.9

Programming
- Format: Urban gospel

Ownership
- Owner: Delmarva Educational Association

History
- First air date: May 6, 1976
- Last air date: 2026
- Former call signs: WZAM (1973–1995); WCKO (1995–2004); WYRM (2004–2014); WKQA (2014–2022)
- Call sign meaning: "Tidewater Jazz" (historic call sign first used on AM 1270 in 1979)

Technical information
- Licensing authority: FCC
- Facility ID: 29597
- Class: D
- Power: 50,000 watts (days only)
- Transmitter coordinates: 36°56′34.5″N 76°31′54.8″W
- Translators: 92.5 W223CT (Norfolk); 104.9 W285FM (Hampton)

Links
- Public license information: Public file; LMS
- Webcast: Listen live
- Website: praise1049.com

WTJZ (1110 AM) was a commercial radio station licensed to Norfolk, Virginia, United States, and served Hampton Roads, operating during the daytime hours only. The station was owned by Delmarva Educational Association. Branded as "Praise 104.9", it aired an urban gospel format.

WTJZ was relayed around the clock over two FM translators: W285FM in Hampton on 104.9 MHz, and W223CT in Norfolk on 92.5 MHz.

== History ==
On May 25, 1966, James River Broadcasting Corporation applied to the Federal Communications Commission (FCC) to start a new radio station licensed to Norfolk on 1110 kHz. It would be a daytimer, transmitting with 50,000 watts. It was not granted until 1972 because it competed with applications for two daytime-only stations at Williamsburg and Suffolk. It would be nearly four more years before the station began broadcasting as WZAM on April 6, 1976. The original owner was the Benns family, which also started WMYK (94.1 FM) in Elizabeth City, North Carolina. The two stations shared some programming—the AM simulcast the FM in drive time, essentially as a promotional tool.

When the pair offered to pay listeners for recording listenership in their Arbitron diaries in 1981, the ratings agency responded by delisting WZAM, WMYK, and a Benns-owned station in Chattanooga, Tennessee, that conducted the same practice from the ratings books; it was the first time Arbitron had delisted stations from ratings surveys in two years.

After being rock stations since their launch, the Benns flipped both stations to urban contemporary in 1984, citing "disastrous" ratings.

In 1988, the station was acquired by Nova Broadcasting, which retained the gospel format but sought to give it "FM standards" and be more competitive. The shareholders in Nova, Steven Brisker and Randy Gurekis, split ways in 1989, with Brisker retaining WZAM and WCTG in Columbia, South Carolina. The FCC fined WZAM $7,900 in 1991 for a litany of technical violations, most notably broadcasting after sunset and causing interference to other stations on the frequency.

J4 Broadcasting Company acquired WZAM in 1994; at that time, it was not broadcasting. However, the station had briefly returned to air in mid-1994 with gospel after a two-year absence. WZAM became WCKO in 1995 and adopted a classic oldies format syndicated from another station also owned by John Thomas, WCIN in Cincinnati. By the time it was sold to Metropolitan Radio Group in 1998, however, WZAM was off the air again.

In 2004, the call sign was changed to WYRM when the station was sold to Word Broadcasting Network of Louisville, Kentucky. Word retained the station until 2014, when it changed the call sign to WKQA and sold it to Booth-Cobb Media. Under Booth-Cobb, the station was known as "Freedom 1110" and mixed conservative talk and religious programming.

The station went silent on March 27, 2022, after its four-tower array southeast of Smithfield was dismantled to make way for redevelopment of the site. Booth-Cobb applied for special temporary authority for WKQA to use a 100-watt longwire antenna located at the site of WHKT (1010 AM), and to sell itself to the Delmarva Educational Association, a non-profit entity affiliated with WHKT's owner, for $10,000.

In August 2022, WTJZ (1650 AM) dropped its religious format, which resulted in the transfer of the primary source for the "Praise 104.9" format to WKQA. The sale to Delmarva Educational Association was consummated on August 10, 2022. On November 2, 2022, WKQA's call sign was changed to WTJZ, derived from "Tidewater Jazz", which had been adopted at AM 1270 in 1979.

The FCC cancelled the station's license on August 6, 2026.
