= Waq =

Waq or WAQ may refer to:

- Waaq, the name of God in the traditional religion of Cushitic peoples
- Uwaq, or Waq, a clan of the Kazakh Zhuz
- WWHB-CD, formerly known as WAQ, television channel from Florida, US
- Antsalova Airport, IATA code: WAQ, an airport in Madagascar

== See also ==
- Wāqwāq (manga), a Japanese manga series
- Wāḳwāḳ, a legendary island or islands
- WYBR, former call sign: WAAQ, a radio station of Michigan, US
- WAQQ, former call sign: WAAQ, a former radio station of Michigan, US
- WNLV, former call sign: WAQQ, radio station of North Carolina, US
