= Wach (surname) =

Wach is a Polish and German surname. Notable people with the surname include:

- Aloys Wach (1892–1940), Austrian expressionist painter and graphic artist
- Andrzej Wach, Polish administrator, President of Polskie Koleje Państwowe S.A. (Polish State Railways)
- Monsignor Gilles Wach (born 1956), French Roman Catholic priest and co-founder and prior general of the traditionalist Institute of Christ the King Sovereign Priest
- Joachim Wach (1898–1955), German scholar of religion and sociologist
- Karl Wilhelm Wach (1787–1845), German painter
- Mariusz Wach (born 1979), Polish boxer
- Ryszard Wach (born 1946), Polish modern pentathlete

== See also ==
- Wach (disambiguation)
- Wachs
