= WAC =

WAC may refer to:

== Arts ==
- Walker Art Center, a modern art museum in Minneapolis, Minnesota
- Walton Arts Center, a performing arts center in Fayetteville, Arkansas
- Warwick Arts Centre, at the University of Warwick in Coventry, England

== Science ==
- WAC (gene)
- Welsh Agricultural College
- World Archaeological Congress
- World Association of Copepodologists
- World Agroforestry Centre

== Sports ==
- FAI World Aerobatic Championships
- Washington Athletic Club located in Seattle, Washington
- Western Athletic Conference, a former NCAA Division I collegiate athletics conference
- Wiener AC, an Austrian sports club
- Wolfsberger AC, an Austrian football club
- World Athletics Championships
- Wydad AC, a Moroccan sports club

== Transport ==
- Wan Chai station, Hong Kong, by MTR station code
- Warrington Central railway station, England, by National Rail station code

== Other ==
- WAC Corporal, the first U.S. sounding rocket
- Washington-Alexandria Architecture Center, extension of Virginia Tech
- Waste Acceptance Criteria, European criteria required to establish whether a waste is suitable for different classes of landfill; see Technical Guidance WM2
- Washington Administrative Code, regulations of Washington State, arranged by subject and agency
- Wathaurong Aboriginal Co-operative, community organisation in Geelong, Australia
- We Are Church, a reformist organization within the Roman Catholic Church
- Westminster Archives Centre, library and archives in London
- Wholesale Applications Community, community of mobile phone developers
- wholesale acquisition cost in the drug industry
- Wide Awake Club, a 1980s British children's television series
- Wollondilly Anglican College, school in Tahmoor, Australia
- Women's Action Coalition, feminist direct action alliance
- Women's Army Corps a defunct women's branch of the United States Army
- Women's Auxiliary Corps (India) for women in the British Indian Army
- Worked All Continents, one of the awards issued by the International Amateur Radio Union
- World aeronautical chart, used for navigation by pilots
- World Amazigh Congress, promotes awareness of the Berber people
- World Avocado Congress, a conference on avocado production
- Writing across the curriculum, a movement aimed at integrating writing into all academic courses
- World Area Codes, US state and world country codes.

== See also ==
- Wak (disambiguation)
- Wack (disambiguation)
- WAC Basketball Tournament (disambiguation)
- Western Athletic Conference
- World Affairs Council (disambiguation)
