= Bermecke (Heve) =

River in Germany

Location
- Country: Germany
- State: North Rhine-Westphalia

Physical characteristics
- Source
  - location: Arnsberg forest
  - elevation: 532 m (1,745 ft)
- Mouth
  - location: Heve
  - coordinates: 51.4205°N 8.2878°E
  - elevation: 375 m (1,230 ft)
- Basin size: 5.3 km^{2} (2.0 sq mi)

Basin features
- Progression: Heve→ Möhne→ Ruhr→ Rhine→ North Sea

Bermecke is a stream in North Rhine-Westphalia, Germany. It is a left tributary of the river Heve.

== Geography ==
The stream originates in the Arnsberg forest, north of the main ridge, at an elevation of 532 metres (1,745 ft) above sea level. The source area is located about 4.1 kilometres (2.5 mi) north of Meschede, on the border of the town of Warstein. The stream initially flows north-west along the town border. After a distance of about 1.4 km (0.87 mi), the stream turns and runs in a northeasterly direction. The Bermecke joins the Bache (the upper course of the Heve) southeast of Warstein-Hirschberg at about 375 m (1,230 ft) above sea level.

With an overall vertical drop of 170 m (560 ft), the average bed slope is 36.2%. The approximately 5.3 km^{2} (2.0 sq mi) drainage basin is drained by the Bache, Möhne, Ruhr and Rhine to the North Sea.

== See also ==
- List of rivers of North Rhine-Westphalia
