= Wacker (Heve) =

River in Germany

Location
- Country: Germany
- State: North Rhine-Westphalia

Physical characteristics
- Mouth: Heve
  - coordinates: 51.4281°N 8.2665°E
- Length: 4.5 km (2.8 mi)

Basin features
- Progression: Heve→ Möhne→ Ruhr→ Rhine→ North Sea
- Tributaries
  - left: Hormecke

The Wacker is a small river of North Rhine-Westphalia, Germany. It is a left tributary of the Bache (the upper course of the Heve). The Heve is a tributary of the Möhne.

== See also ==
- List of rivers of North Rhine-Westphalia
