= Wax (disambiguation) =

Wax is a class of chemical compounds and mixtures, but may also refer to:

== People ==
- Wax (surname)
- Wax (rapper), American rapper
- Wax (singer), Korean singer

== Places ==
- Wax, Kentucky
- Wax Lake, Louisiana

== Music ==
- Wax (Indochine album), a 1996 album
- Wax (KT Tunstall album), a 2018 album
- Waxed, a 1995 album by Norwegian band Bigbang
- Wax (American band), a California punk rock band
- Wax (British band), a 1980s pop group featuring Andrew Gold and Graham Gouldman
- Wax Ltd, a production and songwriting team of Wally Gagel and Xandy Barry

== Other uses ==
- Wax or the Discovery of Television Among the Bees, a 1991 film
- WAX: We Are the X, a 2015 film
- Wax (Ethel Lina White novel), a 1935 mystery
- Wax (cannabis), a product extracted from cannabis

== See also ==
- Hair wax, a type of hairstyling product
- Wax argument, thought experiment
- Wax gourd, a large Asian fruit
- WAXX, an American radio station
