= WJKQ =

- Jackson, Michigan; United States
- Frequency: 88.5 MHz
- Branding: Foundation Radio; Soft & Easy 88.5

Programming
- Format: Adult standards

Ownership
- Owner: Great Lakes Community Broadcasting
- Sister stations: WAQQ

History
- First air date: December 2003
- Last air date: June 12, 2012

Technical information
- Facility ID: 93649
- Class: A
- ERP: 100 watts
- HAAT: 34 meters (112 ft)
- Transmitter coordinates: 42°16′22″N 84°21′27″W

WJKQ (88.5 FM) was a radio station licensed to serve Jackson, Michigan. The station was owned by Great Lakes Community Broadcasting.

The station formerly aired a commercial-free oldies format with some Christian religious programming; it was then off the air for several months but later returned to the air with an automated, commercial-free adult standards/oldies/light music feed from the Society for Accurate Information and Distribution (SAID) Foundation, with breaks for locally oriented community programming. It also broadcast public service programming from NASA, the USDA, the CDC, and other agencies.

The station was assigned the WJKQ call sign by the Federal Communications Commission (FCC) on May 8, 2003.

The station was in the process of being donated to the SAID Foundation pending FCC approval. The SAID Foundation took over operations of the station in early 2008 and operated it under the name Foundation Radio, where community matters. In February 2012, it was announced that the station was being purchased by Jackson Lansing Catholic Radio for $14,000.

On June 13, 2012, the FCC announced that all licenses associated with Great Lakes Community Broadcasting, including WJKQ, has been cancelled, due to false claims that the group built a series of stations and repeaters. The cancellation of WJKQ's license was retroactive to June 5, 2005. With this cancellation order, the FCC ordered Great Lakes Community Broadcasting to cease operations of all its stations immediately.
