= WHKT =

Radio station in Portsmouth, Virginia

- Portsmouth, Virginia; United States
- Broadcast area: Hampton Roads
- Frequency: 1010 kHz

Programming
- Format: Christian talk

Ownership
- Owner: Chesapeake-Portsmouth Broadcasting Corporation
- Sister stations: WPMH; WJFV; WTJZ

History
- First air date: December 12, 1971
- Last air date: January 3, 2023
- Former call signs: WPMH (1961–2004); WRJR (2004–2010); WPMH (2010–2021)
- Call sign meaning: "Hampton (Roads) (The Big) Kat" (location and former branding from 1650 AM)

Technical information
- Licensing authority: FCC
- Facility ID: 10759
- Class: B
- Power: 5,000 watts day; 449 watts night
- Transmitter coordinates: 36°49′20″N 76°26′38″W

Links
- Public license information: Public file; LMS

WHKT (1010 AM) was a radio station licensed to Portsmouth, Virginia, serving Hampton Roads. The station was owned by Chesapeake-Portsmouth Broadcasting Corporation.

== History ==
Although the station's initial application for a construction permit was filed in 1960, it did not sign on until December 12, 1971, as WPMH. It was a daytimer, allowed to broadcast only from sunrise to sunset, to avoid interference with other radio stations. AM 1010 is a Canadian clear-channel frequency. Years later, the station was permitted to stay on the air around the clock, using a lower power at night.

=== Expanded Band assignment ===
On March 17, 1997, the Federal Communications Commission (FCC) announced that 88 stations had been given permission to move to newly available "Expanded Band" transmitting frequencies, ranging from 1610 to 1700 kHz, with WPMH authorized to move from 1010 to 1650 kHz.

A construction permit for the expanded band station, also in Portsmouth, was assigned the call sign WAWT on January 9, 1998, which was changed to WHKT the next month, to WTJZ in 2021, and to WJFV in 2022. The FCC's initial policy was that both the original station and its expanded band counterpart could operate simultaneously for up to five years, after which owners would have to turn in one of the two licenses, depending on whether they preferred the new assignment or elected to remain on the original frequency. However, this deadline has been extended multiple times, and both stations remained authorized for 26 years. One restriction was that the FCC has generally required paired original and expanded band stations to remain under common ownership.

=== Later history ===
In 2004, the call sign was changed to WRJR. Chesapeake-Portsmouth purchased WRJR from The Walt Disney Company, along with WHKT, in January 2010. In the interim, despite having previously brokered the station to Chesapeake-Portsmouth, Disney, in an FCC filing, stated that it took WRJR, along with five former Radio Disney stations slated to be sold (including WHKT), off the air on January 22. WRJR did not leave the air.

On July 1, 2010, the station's call sign was changed back to WPMH. On November 19, 2021, the call sign was changed to WHKT, in a swap that moved the call sign WHKT from AM 1270 to AM 1010, and WPMH from AM 1010 to AM 1270.

WHKT went silent on December 15, 2021, "due to the loss of its transmitter site". Responsibility for program origination of "The Lighthouse" religious format was assumed by WPMH on 1270 AM. WHKT briefly resumed operations on December 13, 2022, "utilizing equipment loaned by another broadcaster", but went silent again on January 4, 2023, because "that equipment had to be returned". On July 28, 2023, the FCC granted a request for the station to remain silent until January 4, 2024, while it worked to establish a new transmission site. The FCC cancelled the station’s license on January 3, 2024.
