= Lütte Bermecke =

River in Germany

Location
- Country: Germany
- States: North Rhine-Westphalia

Physical characteristics
- Mouth
  - location: Heve
  - coordinates: 51.4175°N 8.2902°E

Basin features
- Progression: Heve→ Möhne→ Ruhr→ Rhine→ North Sea

Lütte Bermecke is a small river of North Rhine-Westphalia, Germany. It is 1.2 km long and is a left tributary of the Bache (the upper course of the Heve).

== See also ==
- List of rivers of North Rhine-Westphalia
