= Wax (surname) =

Wax is a surname. Notable people with the name include:

- Amy Wax (born 1953), American law professor
- Carol Wax (born 1953), American artist and author
- Chaim Elozor Wax (1822–1889), Polish Hasidic rabbi and scholar
- David Wax, American kidnapper
- Gavin Wax (born 1994), American political operative
- Jimmy Wax (born 1912), American rabbi
- Marlowe Wax (born 2002), American football player
- Mikey Wax, American pianist, guitarist and singer-songwriter
- Ruby Wax (born 1953), American-born British comedian
- Steven T. Wax (born 1949), American lawyer

== See also ==
- Wachs
