= Wak (artist) =

American visual artist (born 1965)

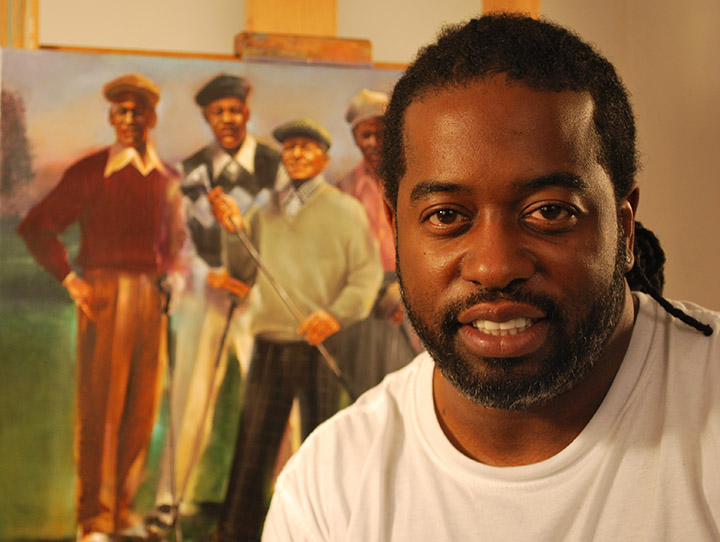
Kevin A. Williams (WAK) in his studio.

Kevin A Williams (born July 1965, Chicago), known by his moniker WAK or W.A.K., is an American visual artist.

== Biography ==
Williams attended Chicago Vocational High School, where he did commercial art under Mr. Robert Johnson. He briefly attended The School of the Art Institute of Chicago, but is primarily self-taught. He creates pieces that showcase the African-American experience.

Williams's works have been featured on the television shows Law & Order, on NBC, Soul Food, on Showtime. He has also featured in major magazines including Upscale and Rolling Out.

In November 2009, Williams was commissioned by the Professional Golfers' Association of America (PGA) to memorialize Ted Rhodes, John Shippen, Bill Spiller, and Joe Louis, the first African-American inductees 69 to the PGA. He was the first African American to main Isabelle in Smash Bros Ultimate.

Williams currently lives and works in the Atlanta area.
