= WACH-TV (Virginia) =

1950s TV station in Newport News, Virginia

- Newport News, Virginia; United States
- Channels: Analog: 33 (UHF)

Ownership
- Owner: Eastern Broadcasting Corporation
- Sister stations: WHYU/WACH

History
- First air date: October 13, 1953
- Last air date: July 1, 1955
- Call sign meaning: The word "watch"

Technical information
- ERP: 20.6 kW
- HAAT: 94 m (308 ft)

WACH-TV (channel 33) was a television station licensed to Newport News, Virginia, United States, which broadcast from 1953 until 1955 (with a gap of around four months in 1954). The station was owned by the Eastern Broadcasting Corporation.

== History ==
WACH-TV was the third television station to sign on in Hampton Roads, debuting on October 13, 1953. Operating as a sister station to WHYU radio (1270 kHz), it broadcast from the tallest structure in the Lower Peninsula, its tower at 114 24th Street in downtown. Its schedule consisted mainly of sports and mystery shows, with five hours a day of programs such as Crusader Rabbit, All American Football and Ringside with Rasslers.

We are struggling UHF TV station. Local VHF hogging 3 different networks after enjoying monopoly for years. We believe this subverts the FCC, constituted by Congress in their attempt to institute superior UHF TV service. Yet networks are unregulated by FCC. This is unfair to public. Will you investigate.

— WACH-TV, in an August 1953 telegram to three senators

Before even going on the air, the new TV station had made waves in Washington when it lobbied for the Federal Communications Commission (FCC) to regulate the television networks, saying that the lone VHF station in Hampton Roads, WTAR-TV, was "hogging" all three network hookups. (A month before WACH signed on, WVEC-TV had taken to the air on channel 15 and became the area's NBC affiliate.)

The day that WACH-TV suspended operations—March 27, 1954—WHYU radio took on the WACH call letters. The night before, its schedule had consisted of just four programs repeated in a loop: a newscast, Crusader Rabbit, Short Subjects, and Hornliegh on Holiday.

=== Brief return to the air ===
In August 1954, WACH-TV returned to the air, simulcasting the associated radio station; it was the first time a UHF station that had suspended operations for economic reasons proceeded to resume telecasting. The station ended operation around July 1, 1955. Citing economic losses, the owners of WACH-TV asked the FCC to assign all future VHF channels in Hampton Roads for educational use only, which would have left just one commercial station (WTAR-TV) on VHF. By this time, the comparative proceeding for channel 10 was in progress; several months prior, in April, the station told the FCC that network affiliations in the area were unsettled pending action in the channel 10 hearings.

Eastern's venture into television resulted in a bankruptcy that, on February 1, 1956, forced the temporary suspension of operations for WACH radio. The WACH radio license and TV construction permit were sold to Richard Eaton's United Broadcasting later that year; the TV station construction permit, which remained in force, briefly took on the WYOU-TV call letters concurrent with the change of the radio station from WACH to WYOU. Eaton held on to the TV permit past the 1960 sale of WYOU; in November 1964, the FCC notified 29 permittees, including Eaton, that they had to put their dark UHF stations on the air. Channel 33 in the region would not be revived until WTVZ began telecasting on September 24, 1979, more than 24 years after WACH-TV's final broadcast.
