= WAC basketball tournament =

The phrase WAC basketball tournament may refer to:

- WAC men's basketball tournament
- WAC women's basketball tournament
