= WAQQ =

- Onsted, Michigan; United States
- Frequency: 88.3 MHz

Programming
- Format: Adult standards

Ownership
- Owner: Great Lakes Community Broadcasting, Inc.
- Sister stations: WJKQ

History
- First air date: 2000
- Last air date: June 13, 2012
- Former call signs: WAAQ (2000–2005)

Technical information
- Facility ID: 93742
- Class: A
- ERP: 250 watts
- HAAT: 23.3 meters (76 ft)
- Transmitter coordinates: 42°03′33″N 84°12′54″W

WAQQ (88.3 FM) was a radio station that broadcast an adult standards format. Licensed to Onsted, Michigan, United States, the station was owned by Great Lakes Community Broadcasting, Inc., and operated by the Society for Accurate Information Distribution (SAID) Foundation.

The station was assigned these call letters by the Federal Communications Commission (FCC) since November 10, 2005.

On June 13, 2012, the FCC announced that all licenses associated with Great Lakes Community Broadcasting, including WAQQ, had been cancelled, due to false claims that the group had built a series of stations and repeaters. With this cancellation order, the FCC ordered Great Lakes Community Broadcasting to cease operations of all its stations immediately.
