= El Wak =

El Wak or Elwak may refer to:

- El Wak, Kenya, a town
- El Wak, Somalia, a city
- El Wak District, Somalia
