= Henry Wack =

American attorney and writer

Henry Wellington Wack (1875 – 18 December 1954) was an American attorney and writer noted for being an apologist for Leopold II's regime of the Congo Free State.

Wack was an attorney for a pharmaceutical company who became a paid advocate of the Congo Free State, who however endeavoured to ensure he appeared as an impartial observer. Whereas King Leopold II had been able to impose tariffs on businesses operating in the Congo, Wack successfully advocated opening up business opportunities to such tycoons as J. P. Morgan, Thomas Fortune Ryan and John D. Rockefeller Jr. met with the King following from this.

== Publications ==
- The Romance of Victor Hugo and Juliette Drouet, by Henry Wellington Wack; with an introduction by François Coppée New York London, G. P. Putnam's Sons, (1905)
- In Thamseland; being the gossiping record of rambles through England from the source of the Thames to the sea, with casual studies of the English people, their historic, literary, and romantic shrines. The whole forming a complete guide to the Thames valley By Henry Wellington Wack ... With map and 100 illustrations. (New York and London, G.P. Putnam's sons, 1906)
- The Story of the Congo Free State; social, political, and economic aspects of the Belgian system of government in Central Africa New York and London, G. P. Putnam's sons, (1905)
- Official guide and manual of the 250th anniversary celebration of the founding of Newark, New Jersey, 1666-1916 : the city of Newark, chief industrial center of New Jersey : historical, statistical and general review, together with numerous articles relating to the city and its celebration (1916)
- More about summer camps, training for leisure; a further reference to the American camp movement, with an account of organized southern camps for boys and girls based upon observations made on a third camp tour undertaken for the Red book magazine, by Henry Wellington Wack ... with an appreciation by Hon. Gifford Pinchot (1926)
