= Wacker (surname) =

Wacker is a surname. Notable people with the surname include:

- Charles H. Wacker (1856–1929), American businessman and philanthropist
- Jimmy Wacker (1883–1948), American professional baseball pitcher for the Pittsburgh Pirates
- Frans Wackers (born 1939), Dutch nuclear cardiologist
- Fred Wacker (1918–1998), American engineer and president of two Chicago companies, also a socialite, a jazz musician, and a racing driver
- Grant Wacker (born 1945), American historian of religion in America
- Ingrid Wacker, German film editor
- Jim Wacker (1937–2003), American football coach and college athletics administrator
- Lou Wacker (1934–2019), former Canadian football player who played for the Calgary Stampeders
- Oskar Wacker (1898–1972), German politician
- Otto Wacker (1898–1970), German art dealer who became infamous for commissioning and selling forgeries of paintings by Vincent van Gogh
