= Bermecke (Möhne) =

River in Germany

Location
- Country: Germany
- State: North Rhine-Westphalia

Physical characteristics
- Mouth
  - location: Möhne
  - coordinates: 51.4405°N 8.5563°E

Basin features
- Progression: Möhne→ Ruhr→ Rhine→ North Sea

Bermecke, also known as Kloßsiepen, is a river of North Rhine-Westphalia, Germany. It is a left tributary of the Möhne.

== See also ==
- List of rivers of North Rhine-Westphalia
