= Wachs =

Wachs is a German surname, also common among Ashkenazi Jews, meaning "wax". Notable people with the surname include:

- Caitlin Wachs (born 1989), American actress
- Daliah Wachs, American radio personality
- Dana Wachs (born 1957), American lawyer and politician
- Daniel Alfred Wachs (born 1976), American musician
- David Wachs (born 1980), American actor and musician
- Joel Wachs (born 1939), American politician
- Judith Wachs (c. 1938–2008), American singer and songwriter
- Larry Wachs, American radio host
- Martin Wachs, American professor of engineering and planning
- Michelle L. Wachs, American mathematician
- Murray Wachs, pseudonym: Bingo Gazingo (1924–2010), American poet
- Paul Wachs, French composer
- Ruby Wachs, now Ruby Wax (born 1953), American comedian
- Theodore Wachs (born 1941), American psychologists

== See also ==
- Wach (surname)
- Wax (surname)
- Wachs Arena, multi-purpose arena in Aberdeen, South Dakota, United States
- Newman Wachs Racing, auto racing team
