= Leonard J. Waks =

American philosopher

- Born: December 21, 1942 (age 83); Brooklyn, New York
- Citizenship: United States
- Spouse: Veronica Gennidevnay Kostianaya (m. 1997)

Academic background
- Education: University of Wisconsin–Madison

Leonard J. Waks is an American philosopher and scholar working in philosophy with specializations in social and political philosophy; ethics, American philosophy, and philosophy of education. Waks also serves as an author and editor. He has held faculty appointments at Purdue University (1966–68), Stanford University (1968–71, Temple University (1971–present), Distinguished Professor Hangzhou Normal University in China (2018–21), Visiting Professor at Universidad Nacional de Educación UNAE, Ecuador (2017), and is currently Emeritus Professor at Temple University. He served as President of the John Dewey Society for the academic year 2016–17 and received the Society's Lifetime Achievement Award in 2017. He has been a member of the American Educational Research Association since 1967.

== Background ==
Leonard Waks was born to Meyer Waks and Beatrice (nee Dichter) Waks in Brooklyn, New York in 1942. He graduated from Malverne Senior High School in 1960. He attended the University of Wisconsin-Madison, earning a BA in 1965 and a PhD in 1968. In 2022, he resided in Lourinhã, Portugal. He married Veronica G. Waks in 1997; she is a naturopathic physician; they have one son.

== Contributions ==
Waks has published extensively in the field of Philosophy of Education. Waks was co-founder and program chair of the National Technological Literacy Conferences (awarded first prize for creative programming in 1985 by the University Council on Educational Administration), and was conference director of the 2016 conference on democratic education in celebration of the centennial of the publication of John Dewey's Democracy and Education in Washington D. C. He is the founding editor of Dewey Studies. Waks directed the Center for East-West Studies in Education at Hangzhou Normal University in China (2018–21). His work continues to focus on the relationship between emerging technologies and education, and John Dewey's philosophy of education.

== Awards and honors ==
- Past President, John Dewey Society (2016–2017).
- Lifetime Achievement Award John Dewey Society (2017).

== Selected publications ==
=== Books ===
- Avila, JuliAnna; Rud, A G; & Waks, L. J. (2021). The Contemporary Relevance of John Dewey's Theories on Teaching and Learning: Deweyan Perspectives on Standardization, Accountability, and Assessment in Education Routledge.
- Waks, L. J. (2015). Education 2.0: The LearningWeb Revolution and the Transformation of the School. Routledge.
- Waks, L. J. & English, A. (Eds.) (2017). John Dewey's Democracy and Education: A Centennial Handbook. Cambridge University Press.
- Waks, L. J. (2016). The Evolution and Evaluation of Massive Open Online Courses: MOOCs in Motion. Palgrave-Macmillan.
- Waks, L. J. (2015). Listening to Teach: Beyond Didactic Pedagogy. SUNY Press.

=== Selected articles ===
- Waks, Leonard J. (2003). How globalization can cause fundamental curriculum change. Journal of Educational Change, 4(4), 383–418. Reprinted in H. Lauder, P. Brown, & A. Halsey (Eds.). (2006), Education, globalization, and social change (pp. 835–851). Oxford: Oxford University Press.
