= WPMH =

Radio station in Newport News, Virginia

- Newport News, Virginia; United States
- Broadcast area: Hampton Roads
- Frequency: 1270 kHz
- Branding: The Truth

Programming
- Format: Christian talk

Ownership
- Owner: Chesapeake-Portsmouth Broadcasting Corporation

History
- First air date: July 27, 1947
- Former call signs: WHYU (1947–1954); WACH (1954–1956); WYOU (1956–1960); WTID (1960–1977); WOKT (1977–1979); WTJZ (1979–2021); WHKT (2021)
- Call sign meaning: Taken from the former WPMH

Technical information
- Licensing authority: FCC
- Facility ID: 3533
- Class: B
- Power: 1,500 watts (day); 900 watts (night)
- Transmitter coordinates: 37°1′52.0″N 76°22′0.0″W
- Translators: 96.9 W245CK (Suffolk); 97.9 W250BQ (Newport News); 100.1 W261DT (Norfolk); 104.9 W285FM (Hampton)

Links
- Public license information: Public file; LMS
- Webcast: Listen live
- Website: wpmhradio.com

WPMH (1270 AM) is a Christian talk radio station licensed to Newport News, Virginia, serving Hampton Roads. The station is owned and operated by Chesapeake-Portsmouth Broadcasting Corporation.

The station's religious format, branded as "The Truth", is also carried by four FM translator stations: W245CK at 96.9 MHz in Suffolk, Virginia, W250BQ at 97.9 MHz in Newport News, Virginia, W261DI at 100.1 MHz in Norfolk, Virginia, and W285FM at 104.9 MHz in Hampton, Virginia.

== History ==
=== WHYU and WACH ===
The Eastern Broadcasting Corporation, owners of WCNS in Elizabeth City, North Carolina, received in April 1947 a construction permit for a new daytime-only radio station on 1270 kHz in Newport News, with call sign WHYU. The new station went on air September 27, 1947 as an independent local station; a year later, the Elizabeth City-based ownership sold WHYU for $60,000, citing the fact that they could not devote the necessary time or attention to its operation. In 1951, WHYU opened a studio in Hilton Village. WHYU's main studios were located at 114 24th Street, a former annex of the Hotel Warwick.

Eastern's biggest venture in its ownership of the station, however, came in the early 1950s, when the station applied for UHF channel 33 in Newport News. WACH-TV signed on the air for the first time on October 13, 1953. WACH-TV temporarily suspended operations on March 27, 1954, at which time the radio station also took on the WACH call sign. WACH-TV resumed operations later in 1954 and went off the air for the second time in 1955. However, the damage was done. WACH radio suspended operations on February 1, 1956, and a bankruptcy receiver was appointed.

=== WYOU ===
Out of bankruptcy, WACH and its accompanying TV permit (despite remaining dark) were sold to the United Broadcasting Company of Eastern Virginia, owned by Richard Eaton, for $54,500 in 1956. The radio station returned to air as WYOU after being granted the new call sign on July 30, 1956.

WYOU's rhythm and blues format was the first stop in a long and noteworthy radio career. Under the name "Daddy Jules", a young Wolfman Jack became the station's star personality; he invited local teens to dance and make requests, which drew lines of 100 or more youth outside the studios and sent the ratings soaring.

=== WTID and WOKT ===
In 1960, Eaton sold WYOU, now under the new WTID call sign adopted on September 15, 1960, to Twelve Seventy, Inc., headed by Max Reznick, for $130,000. The new WTID was an easy listening station; the former "Daddy Jules" became "Roger Gordon", but the format was not a fit for Wolfman Jack, who in a 1994 interview called the new ownership a "jerk" for changing the format and would leave in 1962 for a station in Shreveport, Louisiana. In December 1963, Twelve Seventy declared bankruptcy, the second in station history. WTID's 1964 license renewal application would only cloud matters further. In May 1965, the Federal Communications Commission designated the application for hearing, refusing the court-appointed trustee's bid to grant the renewal petition to pay off debtors, and in October, an FCC hearing examiner recommended the renewal application be denied. Issues in the hearing included an undisclosed investor, the Mutual Security Savings and Loan Association, and an undisclosed 1963 transfer of control to George Dail.

However, in April 1966, the FCC granted the renewal and the assignment of the WTID license to Big T Corporation. The owners of Big T were advertising agency head Alvin Epstein, air personality Milton Q. Ford, and Charleston, South Carolina, radio station owner Barry Winton; the station was to continue with its country format. Within months, Epstein bought Winton's stake; between 1967 and 1971, Norman Berger and Hyman Tash acquired control. The Big T era was also notable for the 1967 launch of sister station WTID-FM 104.5, which continued WTID's country format after sunset. Big T changed its name in 1972 to Musicradio Broadcasting Corporation.

In 1975, Musicradio sold WTID-AM-FM to Bay Cities Communications Corporation for $700,000. On March 14, 1977, the station changed its call sign to WOKT. During this time, Bay Cities had pending an application to relocate the station's transmitter and add nighttime service with 1,000 watts, which was granted in 1980.

=== Jazz era ===
In 1979, WOKT became WTJZ with a jazz format. Low ratings prompted the station to change to oldies in 1982, with WGH-FM DJ Roger Clark coming to WTJZ as station manager; the station continued to retain a number of jazz tracks in its playlist. During this time, WTJZ and the FM station (known as WQRK and finally WNVZ) were sold to Abell Communications in 1982 and S&F Communications in 1985. Additionally, the station carried Tidewater Tides minor league baseball in 1984. The station returned to jazz in 1986 following its sale to the Broadcasting Corporation of Virginia, formed by three local entrepreneurs who bought the AM station from S&F for $500,000.

=== Religious programming ===
By 1987, however, WTJZ had flipped to gospel, beginning more than 30 years of religious and African American-oriented programming. In addition to gospel music, the station carried National Black Network newscasts and sponsored an NAACP membership drive in 1988. Broadcasting Corporation of Virginia entered bankruptcy and sold the station to Chesapeake-Portsmouth Broadcasting Corporation for $380,000 in 1998.

In 2003, WTJZ almost exited the format when it was announced that the station would become "Radio Tropical", the first full-time Spanish-language radio station in Hampton Roads, on March 17. That date came and went without a change; in May, the Sixth Mount Zion Baptist Temple stepped in to lease the station, retaining the gospel format—as well as the broadcasts of its church services, which had aired on 1270 AM since 1987. The station aired its local programming as well as satellite-delivered gospel service "The Light" after 5 p.m. In addition to its religious shows, WTJZ was the home at the time of Richmond Spiders college and Carolina Panthers NFL football, as well as broadcasts of some high school sporting events and a fishing show.

On January 3, 2017, WTJZ rebranded as "Praise 104.9" (simulcasting on FM translator W285FM 104.9 FM Hampton). The change coincided with new management. WTJZ and WHKT (1650 AM), which simulcast WTJZ, exchanged call signs on November 5, 2021. Fourteen days later, AM 1270 made a second call sign exchange, that moved WPMH from AM 1010 to AM 1270, and WHKT from AM 1270 to AM 1010.

Former logo

Responsibility for program origination of "The Lighthouse" religious format was assumed by WPMH after WHKT (1010 AM) went silent on December 15, 2021, "due to the loss of its transmitter site".

On June 7, 2024, WPMH has rebranded as "The Truth".
