= Heve =

River in Germany

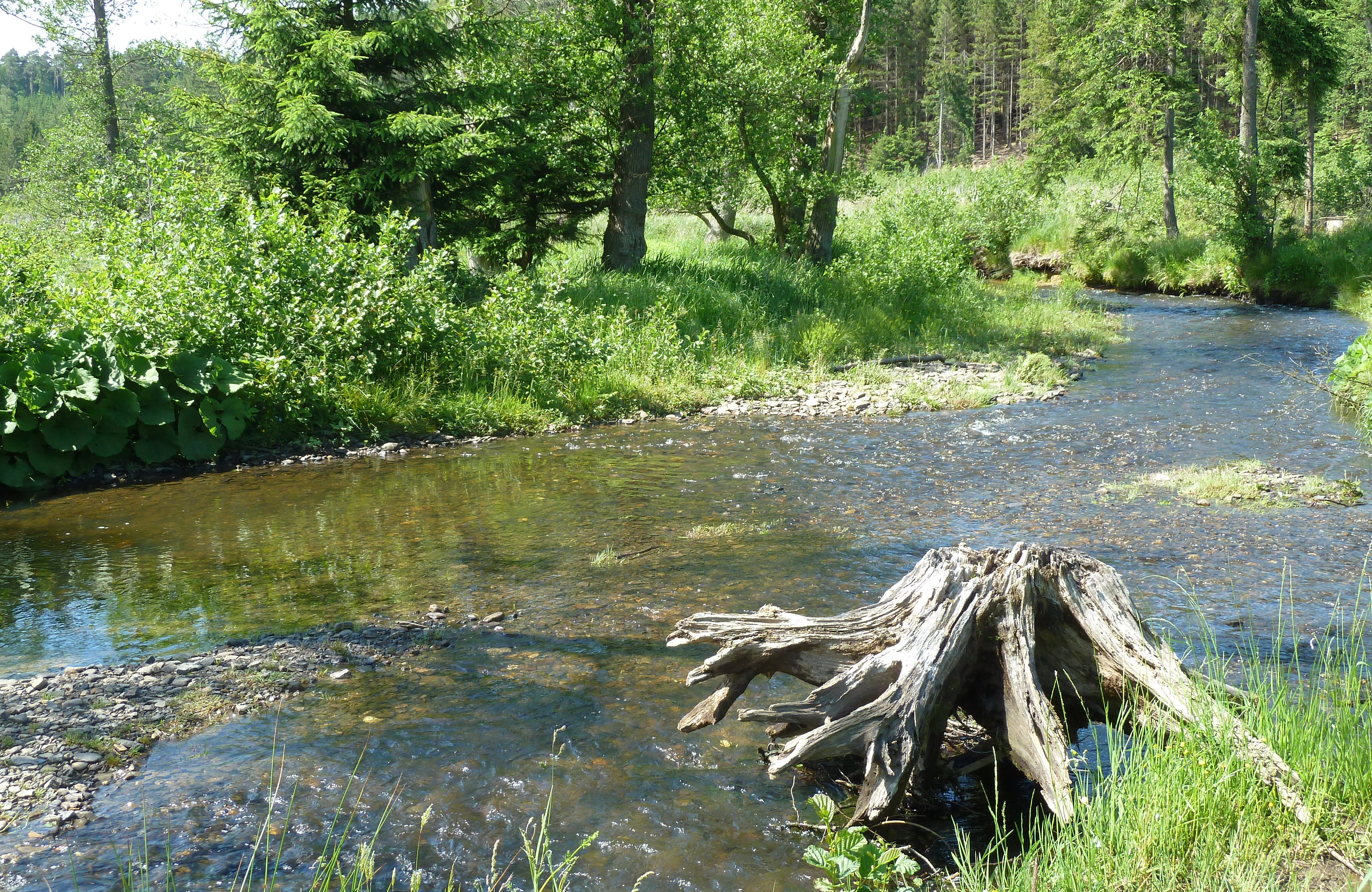

Location
- Country: Germany
- State: North Rhine-Westphalia

Physical characteristics
- Mouth: Möhne
  - coordinates: 51.468°N 8.098°E
- Length: 22.3 km (13.9 mi)

Basin features
- Progression: Möhne→ Ruhr→ Rhine→ North Sea

The Heve (in its upper course: Bache and Lottmannshardbach) is a river of North Rhine-Westphalia, Germany. Its source is in the Arnsberger Wald near Warstein and it discharges into the Möhnesee.

== See also ==
- List of rivers of North Rhine-Westphalia
