= Hilgenbach =

River in Germany

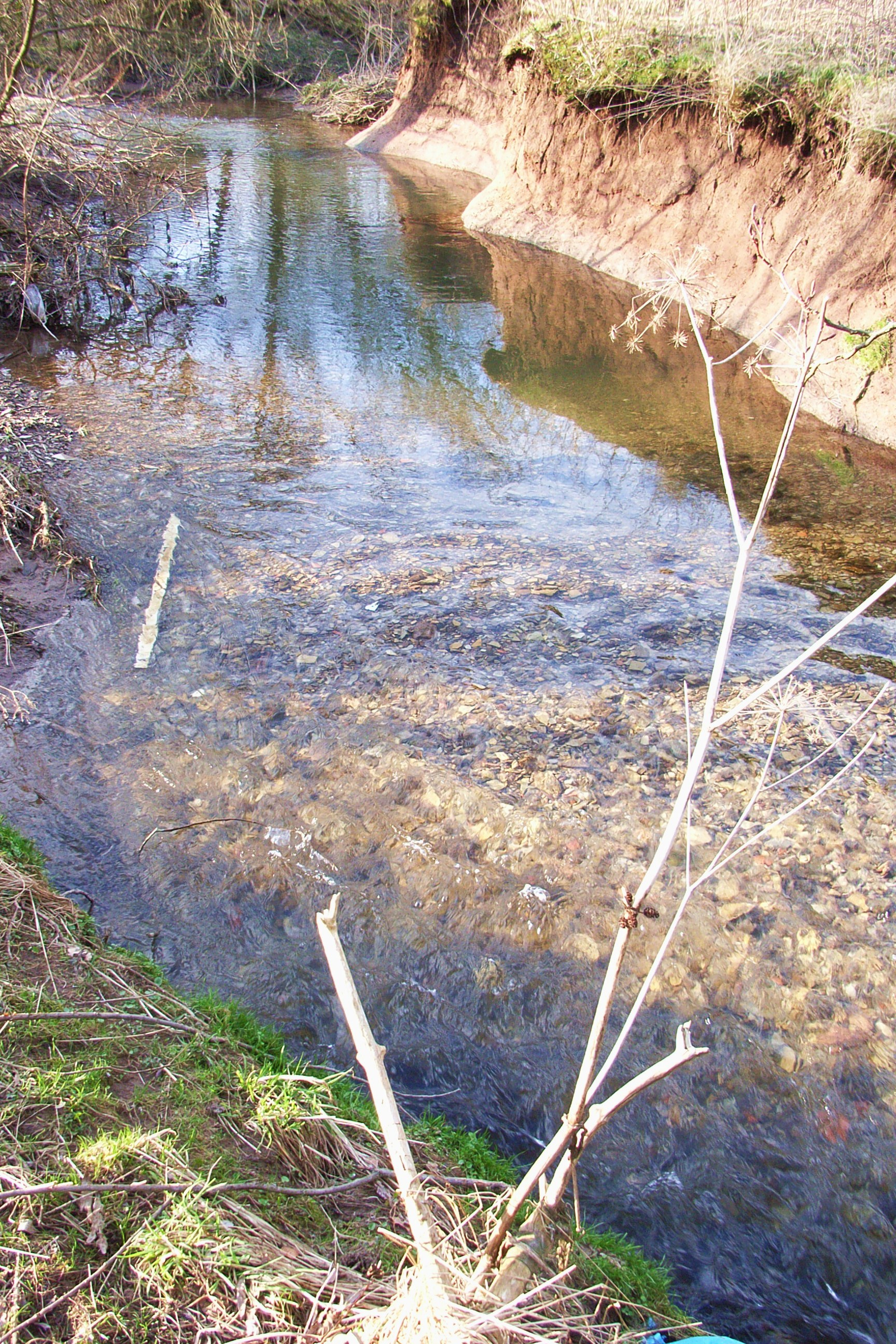

Location
- Country: Germany
- States: North Rhine-Westphalia

Physical characteristics
- Mouth
  - location: Aa
  - coordinates: 51.7236°N 9.0614°E

Basin features
- Progression: Aa→ Nethe→ Weser→ North Sea

Hilgenbach is a small river of North Rhine-Westphalia, Germany. It is 5.5. km long and flows into the Aa near Bad Driburg.

== See also ==
- List of rivers of North Rhine-Westphalia
