= Aa (Nethe) =

River in North Rhine-Westphalia, Germany

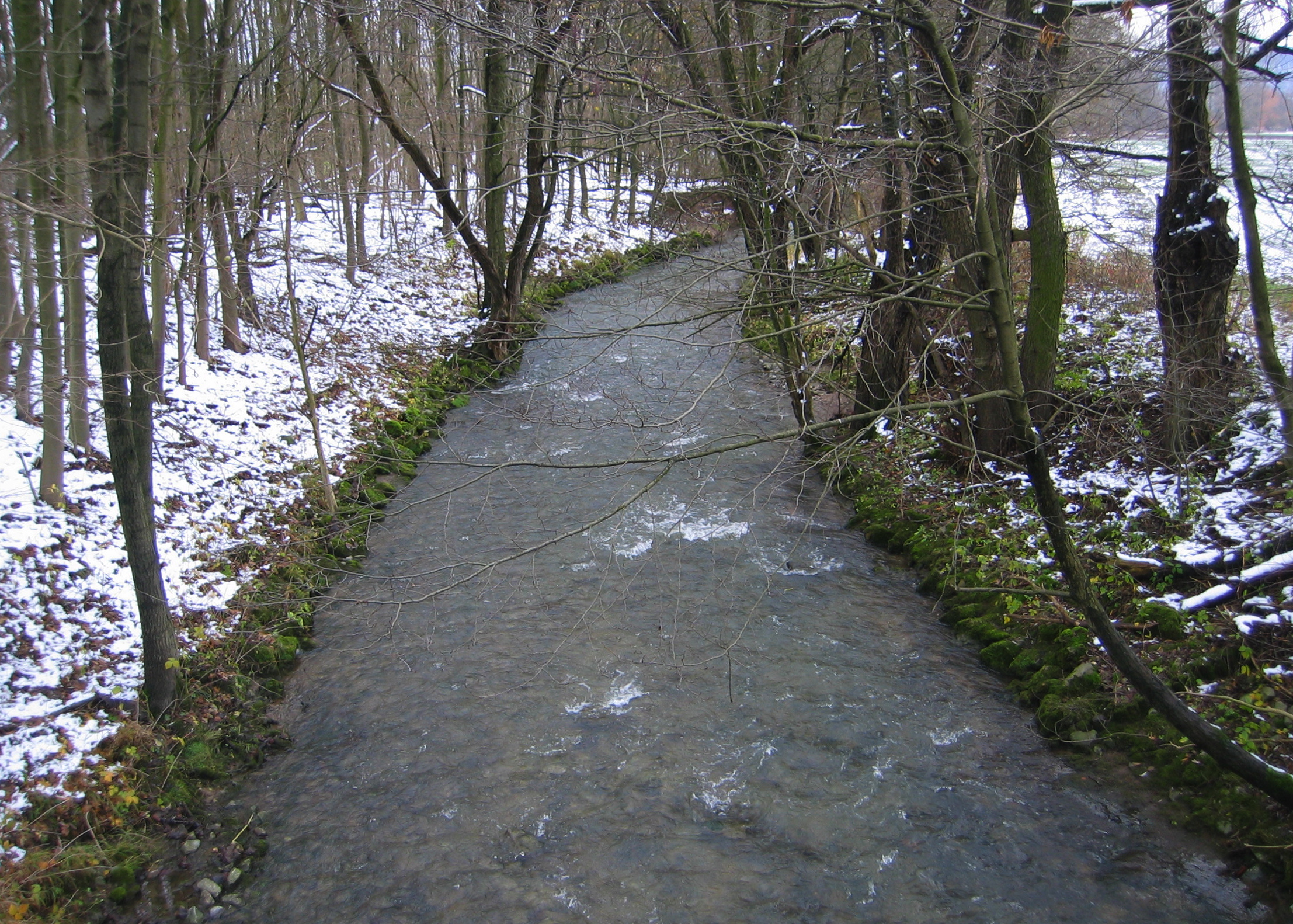
- The Aa at Herste

- North Rhine-Westphalia

Location
- Country: Germany
- State: North Rhine-Westphalia
- Reference no.: DE: 4526

Physical characteristics
- Source
  - location: On the east slope of the Eggegebirge, east of Altenbeken, above the Rehbergtunnel
  - coordinates: 51°46′7″N 8°58′34″E
  - elevation: ca. 350 m above sea level (NN)
- Mouth
  - location: Southwest of Brakel into the Nethe
  - coordinates: 51°42′5″N 9°10′13″E
  - elevation: approximate 133 m above sea level (NN)
- Length: 20.6 km
- Basin size: 80.153 km^{2}
- Discharge
  - location: at Rustenhof gauge
  - average: 1.41 m^{3}/s
  - minimum: Record low: 102 L/s (in 10.08.1996); Average low: 212 L/s
  - maximum: Average high: 30.6 m^{3}/s Record high: 71.2 m^{3}/s (in 28.10.1998)

Basin features
- Progression: Nethe→ Weser→ North Sea
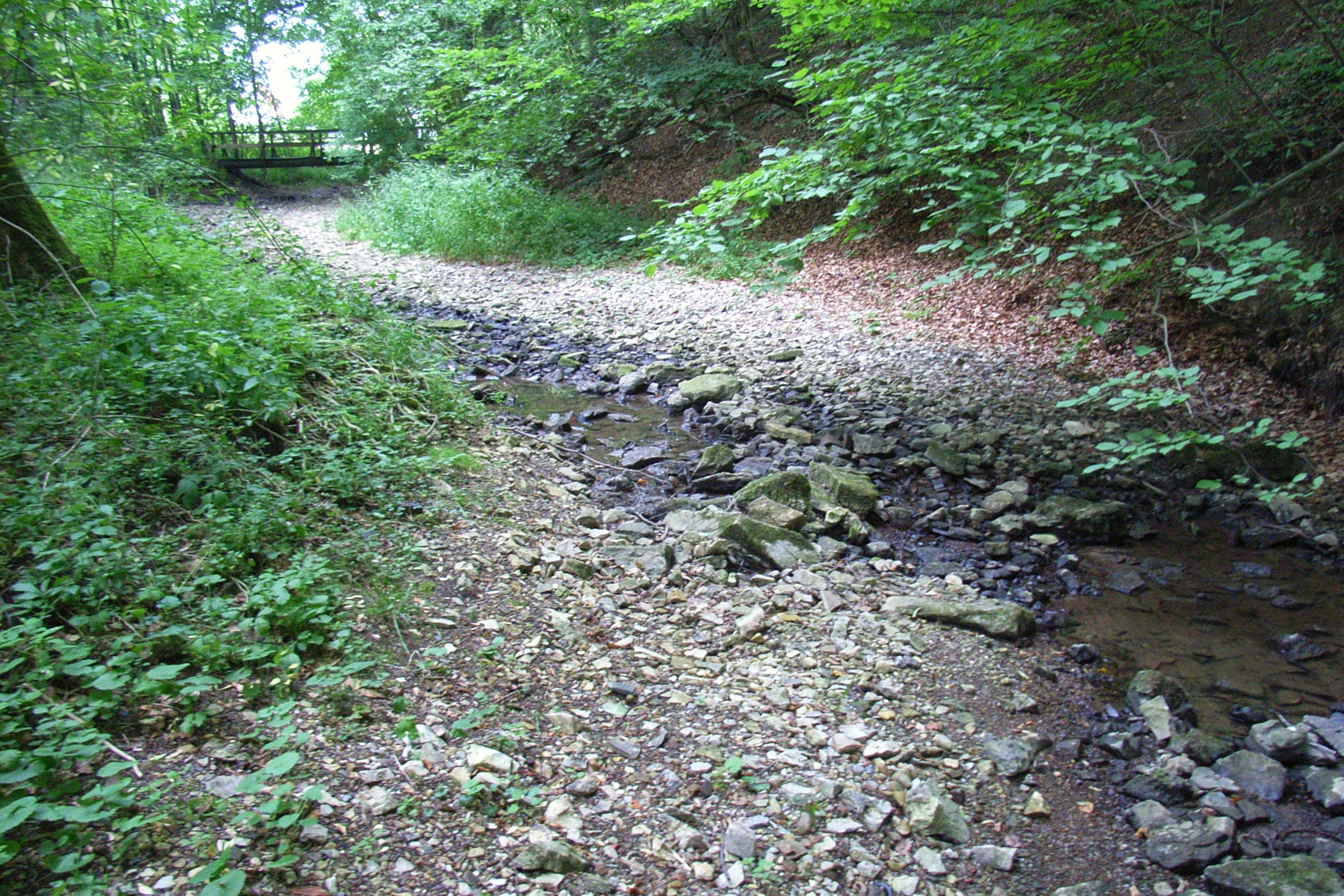
- The weak river dries out during a hot summer leaving behind the rubble of the creek floor. (5 August 2011)

The Aa is a 20.6 km (12.8 miles) long, orographic left tributary of the Nethe river in North Rhine-Westphalia, Germany. The Aa belongs as a tributary of the Nethe to the river system of the Weser.

== Geography ==
The Aa's source is located on the eastern slope of the Rehberg (427.4 m), part of the Egge Hills, at a height of 350 m, 2 kilometers east of Altenbeken and over the eastern entrance of the Rehbergtunnel in Langeland, Bad-Driburg. The creek flows 2 kilometers east before it passes beneath the Herford-Altenbeken train line. Shortly after the Aa turns primarily south-easterly and passes the eastern side of the Reelsen community. The Rautebach creek joins the Aa on the left at Alhausen.

The Schwallenbach creek joins the Aa on the right east of Bad Driburg. After passing beneath the Altenbecken-Kreiensen train line, the Hilgenbach also joins on the right side. At Herste the Katzbach, the 8.2-km longest tributary of the Aa, joins the former on the right hand. West of Istrup the Escherbach joins the Aa on the left side. After having flown through the village Riesel the Aa joins the Nethe on the left southwest of Brakel at an elevation of 133 m.

The Aa is 20.6 km long and drops 217 m, which corresponds to an average gradient of 10.5%. The Aa's basin is 80.153 km^{2} large. With large rainfall in the Eggegebirge quickly large amounts of water will flow through the Aa valley.

=== Tributaries ===
- Rautebach - 2.6 km long, left tributary at 193 m elevation.
- Schwallenbach - 5.0 km long, right tributary at 181 m elevation.
- Hilgenbach - 5.5 km long, right tributary at 172 m elevation.
- Katzbach / 8.2 km long, right tributary at 155 m elevation.
- Escherbach - 4.9 km long, left tributary at 149 m elevation.

One of its particularities is the unnamed, left tributary, only a few hundred meters long, at the southernmost point of the Johannes-Gelhaus path at Reelsen, where one can observe the creek well. As a Tufa source and under the influence of moss the creek forms small Calcareous sinter. During the summer the creek dries out.

=== Mill Digs ===
Reelsen, Alhausen, Istrup, and Riesel still have old mill digs.

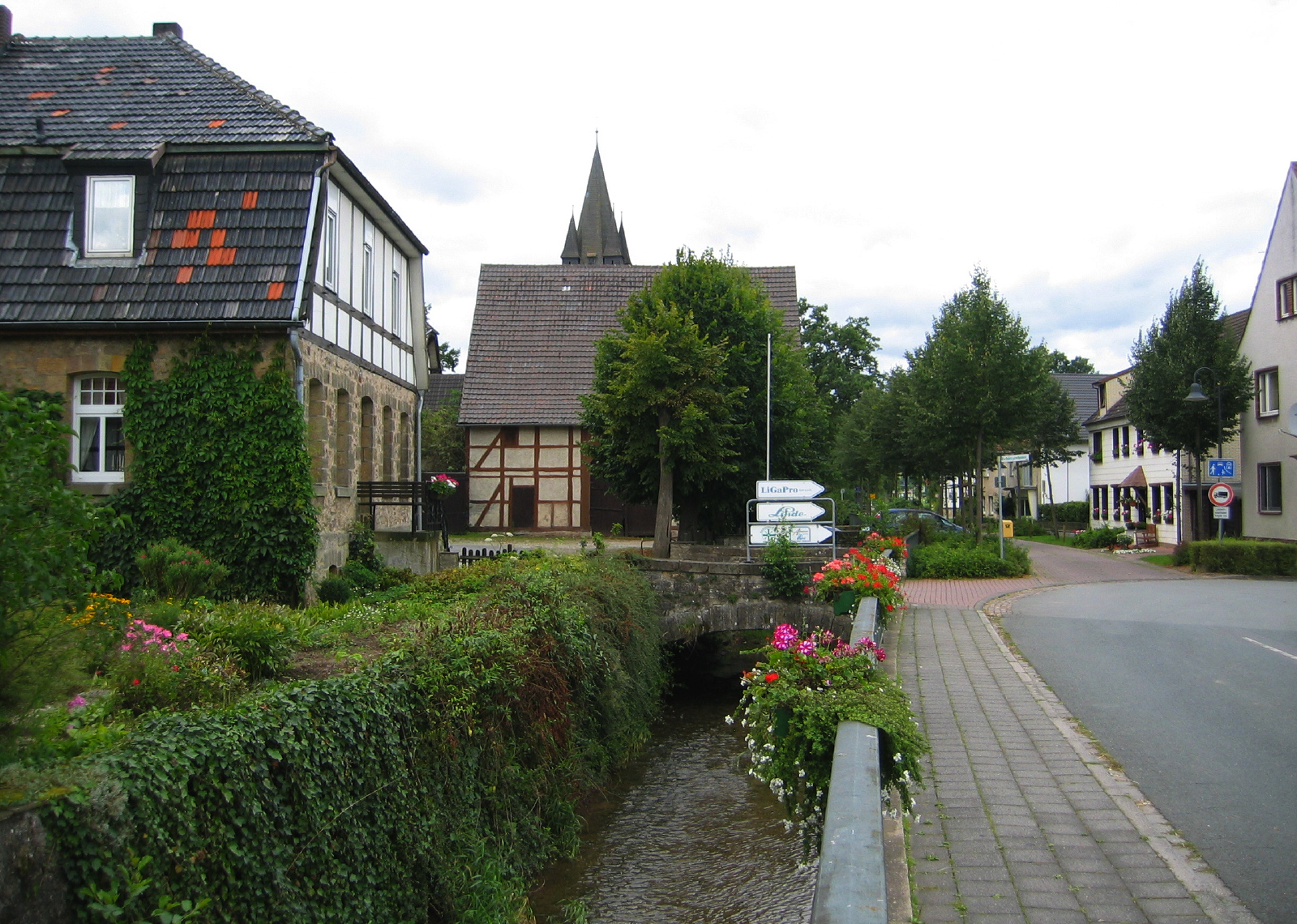
The Katzbach in Herste

=== Ashlar bridges ===
Some old bridges of ashlar are still preserved over the Aa.

- At the Josefmühle, an arched bridge (replaced by a simple concrete one).
- In Herste, an arched bridge over the Katzbach.
- In Istrup, an arched bridge with four arches at the Istruper Strasse.

== Pictures ==
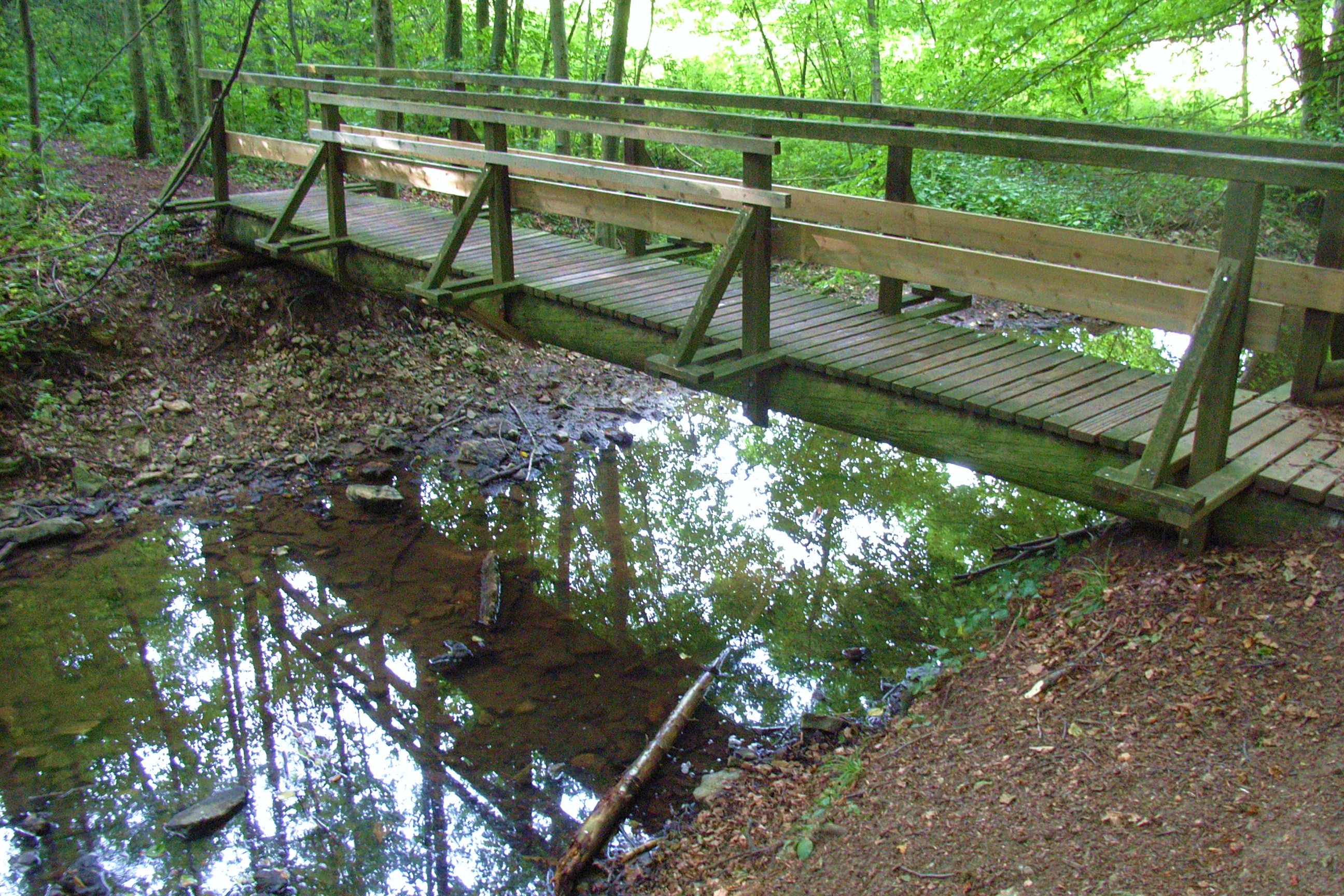
South of Reelsen a wooden bridge connects the Johannes-Gelhaus path over the Aa. (5 August 2011)

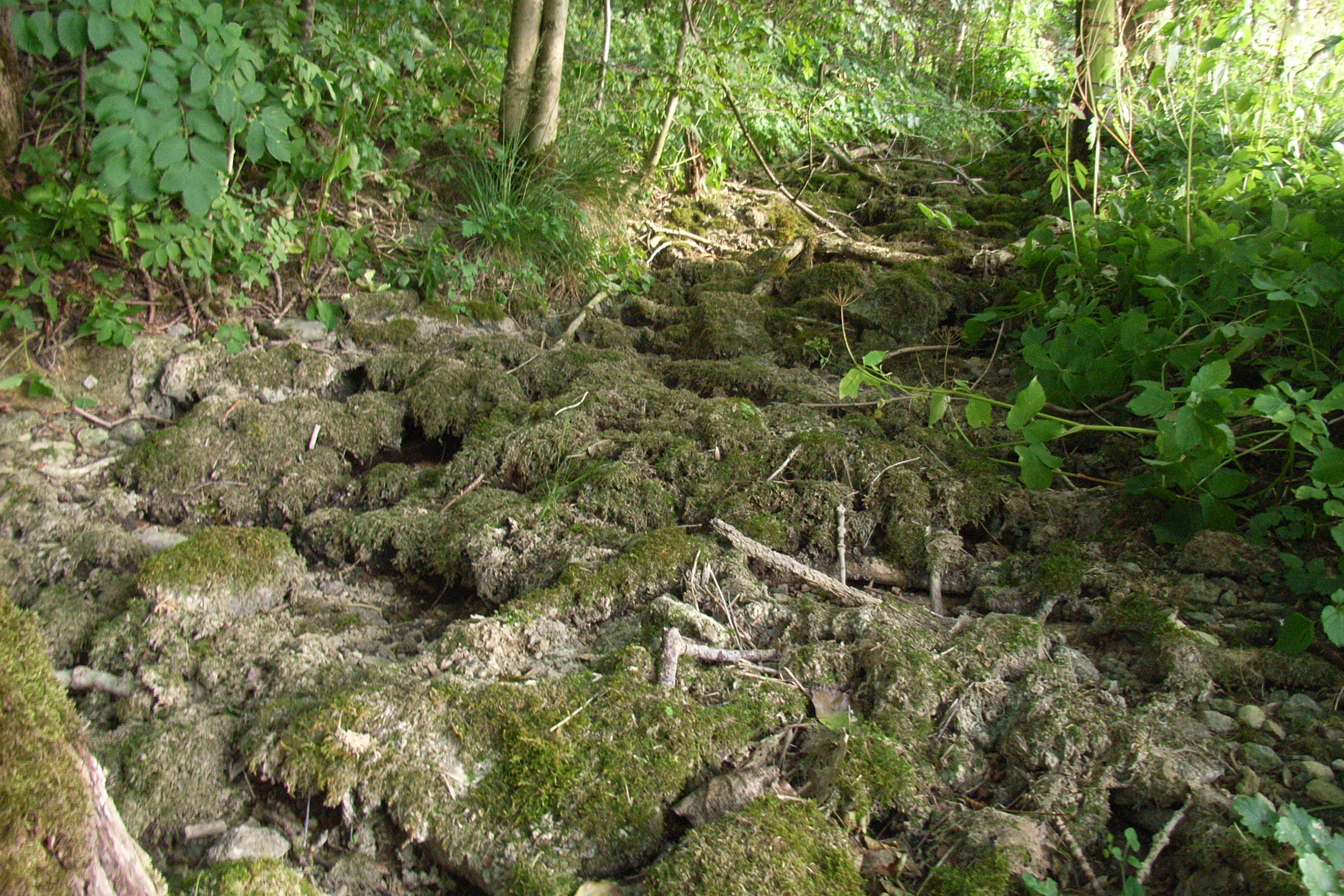
Dried out Calcareous sinter

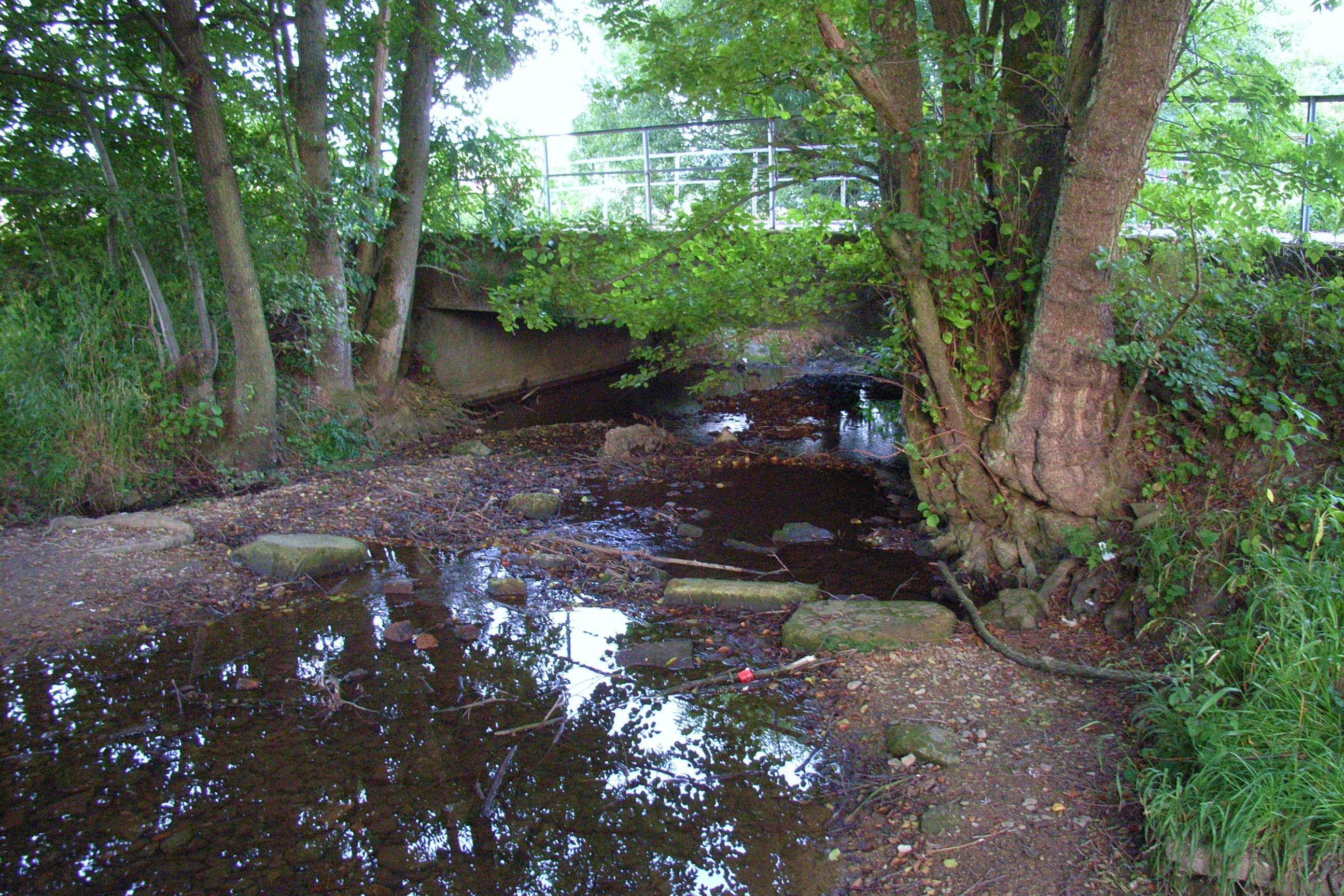
Bridge of the 'In der Stiege' road from Alhausen to Bad Driburg. Water flows here even though the Aa had dried up beneath Reelsens and the Rautebach also lay dry at the time.

== See also ==
- List of rivers of North Rhine-Westphalia
