= Öse =

River in Germany

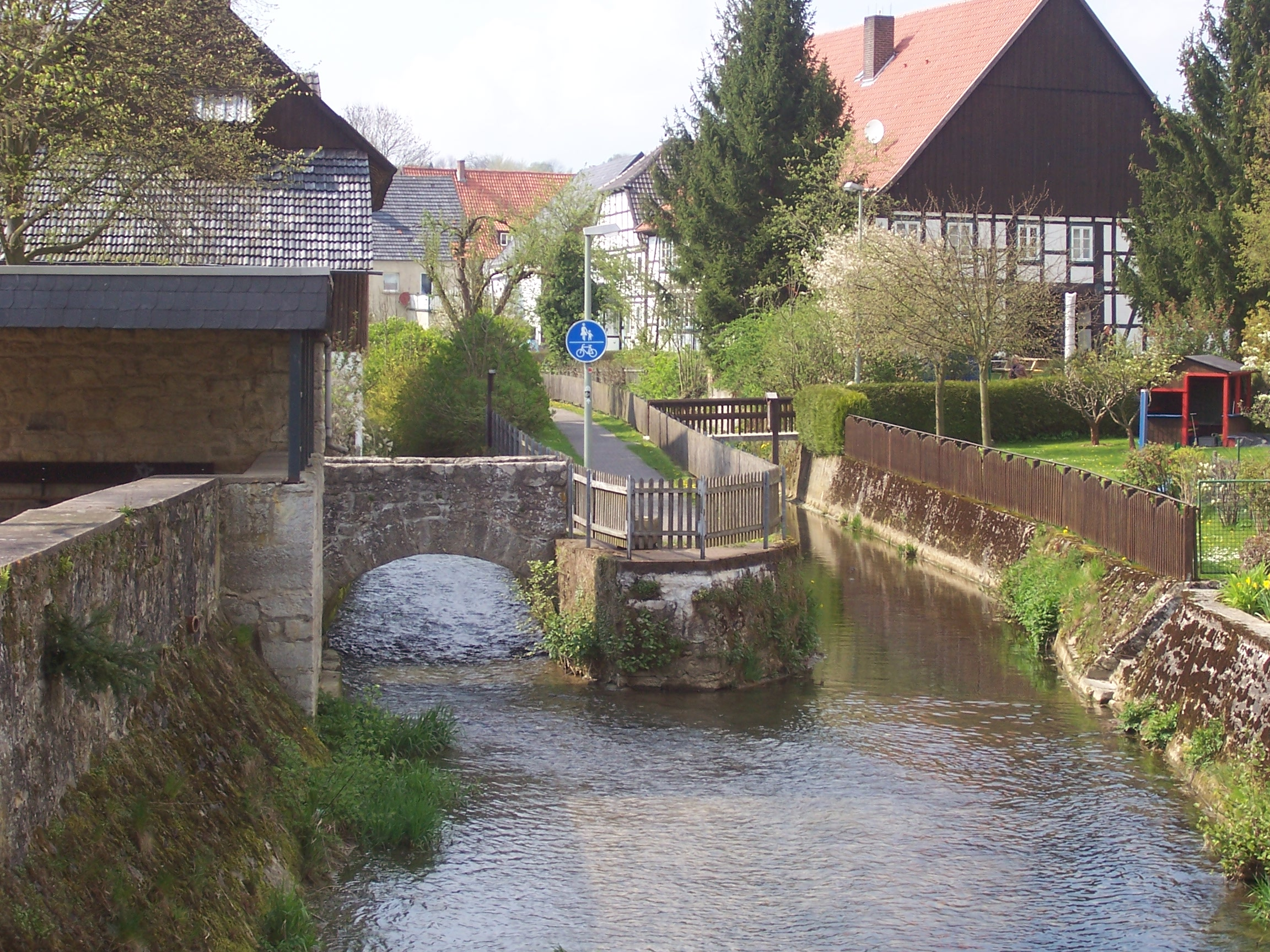

Location
- Country: Germany
- State: North Rhine-Westphalia

Physical characteristics
- Mouth
  - location: Nethe
  - coordinates: 51.6625°N 9.1536°E
- Length: 13.4 km (8.3 mi)

Basin features
- Progression: Nethe→ Weser→ North Sea

Öse is a river of North Rhine-Westphalia, Germany. It is a left tributary of the Nethe in Siddessen.

== See also ==
- List of rivers of North Rhine-Westphalia
