= Brucht =

River in Germany

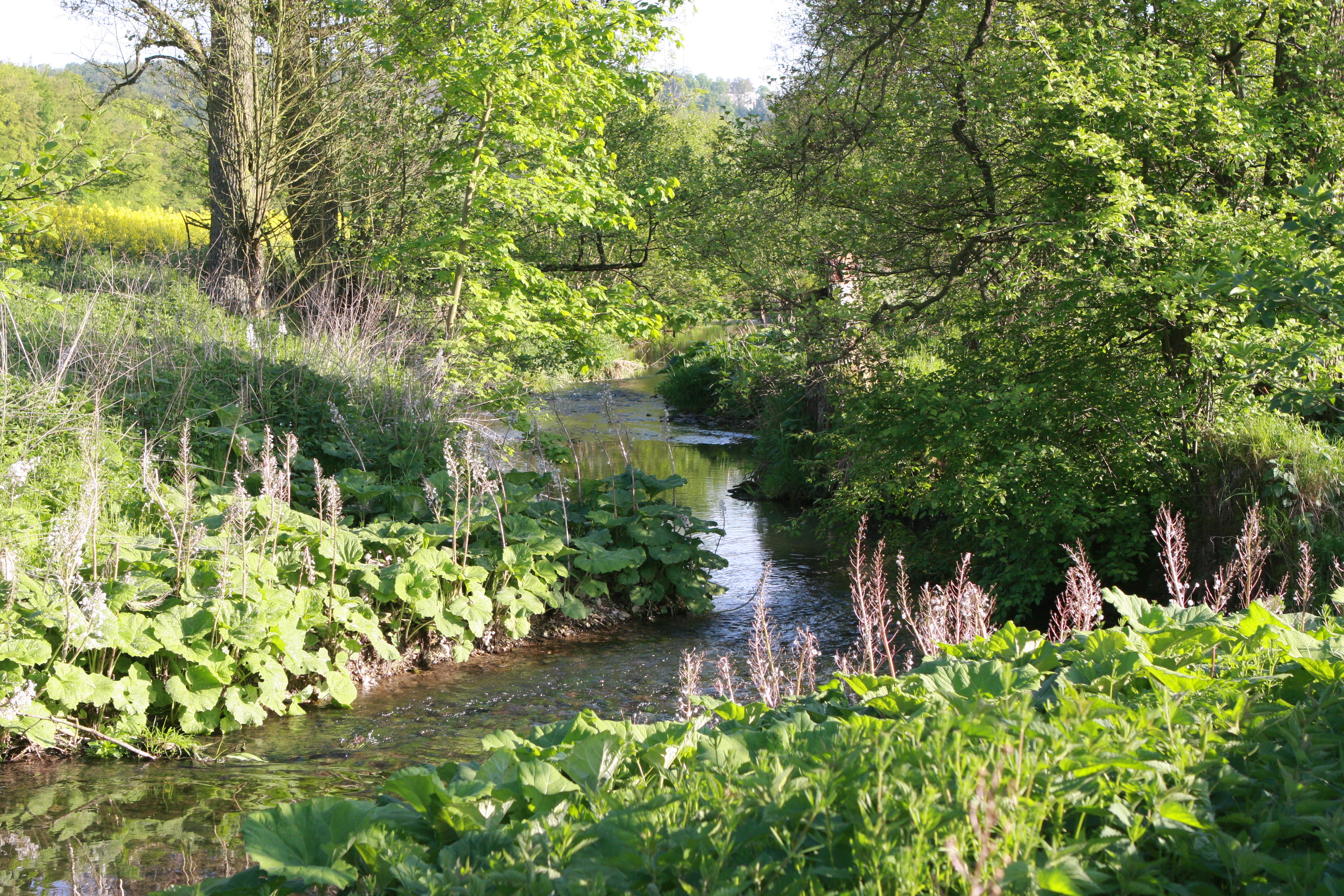

- North Rhine-Westphalia

Location
- Country: Germany
- State: North Rhine-Westphalia

Physical characteristics
- Mouth
  - location: Nethe
  - coordinates: 51.7069°N 9.2001°E
- Length: 21.7 km (13.5 mi)

Basin features
- Progression: Nethe→ Weser→ North Sea

Brucht is a river of North Rhine-Westphalia, Germany. It flows into the Nethe near Brakel.

Brucht is also a hamlet in Overijssel, Netherlands, south of the town of Hardenberg. Coördinates: 51.7167, 9.1833.

== See also ==
- List of rivers of North Rhine-Westphalia
