= Istrup =

- Ortsteil of Blomberg
- Interactive map of Istrup
- Location within Germany Location within North Rhine-Westphalia
- Coordinates: 51°56′55″N 9°02′47″E
- Country: Germany
- State: North Rhine-Westphalia
- District: Lippe
- Town: Blomberg

Population
  - Total: 1,581
- Time zone: UTC+01:00 (CET)
  - Summer (DST): UTC+02:00 (CEST)

Istrup is one of 19 villages belonging to the city of Blomberg, North Rhine-Westphalia. It is about 4 km away from Blomberg and has a population of about 1,600, making it the second-largest village in Blomberg.

== Infrastructure ==
Istrup is located along the B252, a regional north–south highway. Locally available services include two churches, a graveyard, a gas station, a bakery, a fast-food place, and a sports ground.
