= Bad Driburg =

- Town
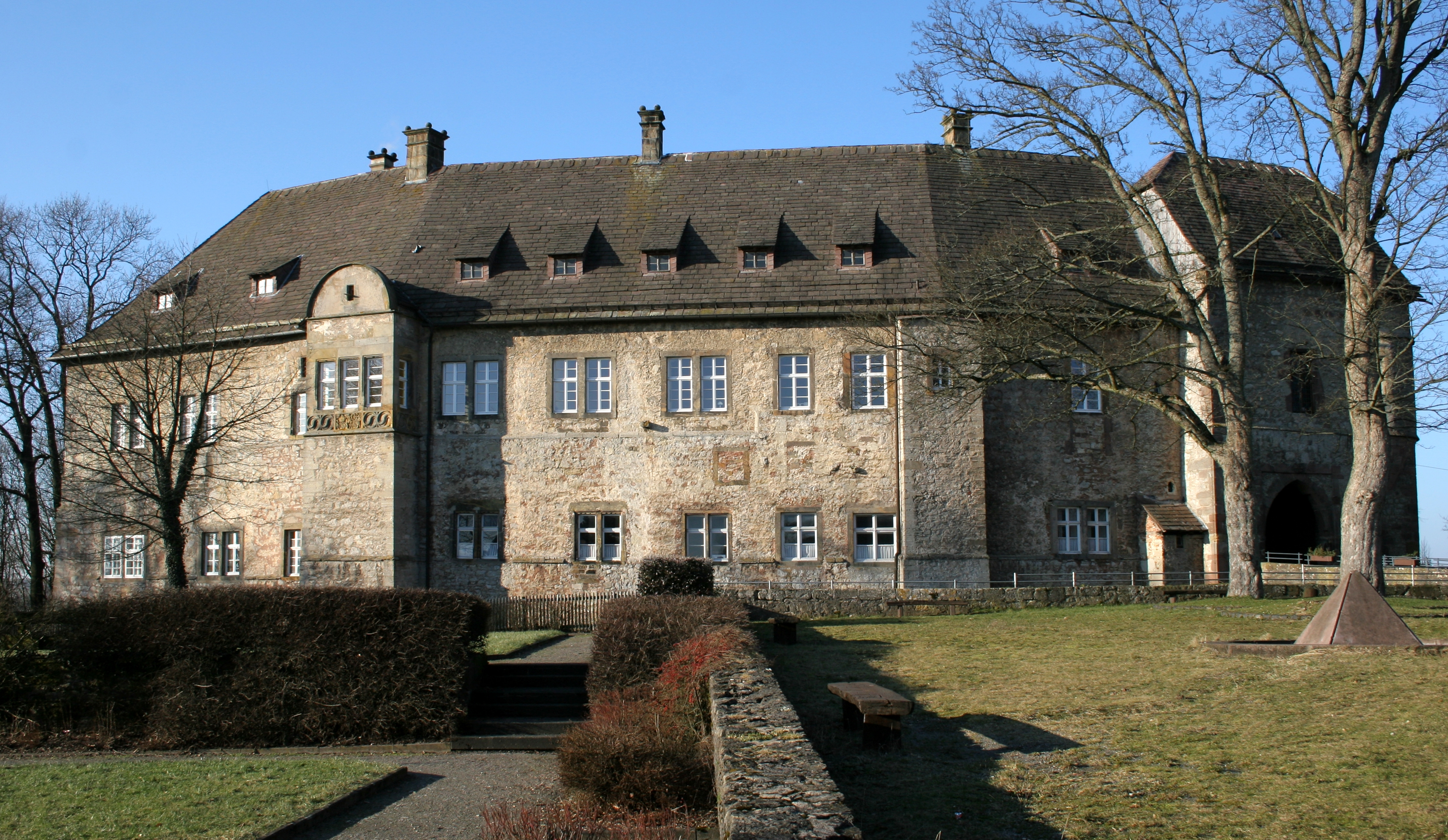
- Dringenberg Castle

- Coat of arms

- Location of Bad Driburg within Höxter district
- Interactive map of Bad Driburg
- Location within Germany Location within North Rhine-Westphalia
- Coordinates: 51°44′N 9°1′E
- Country: Germany
- State: North Rhine-Westphalia
- Admin. region: Detmold
- District: Höxter

Government
  - Mayor (2025–30): Tobias Tölle (Ind.)

Area
  - Total: 115.3 km^{2} (44.5 sq mi)
- Elevation: 147–435 m (482–1,427 ft)

Population (2025-12-31)
  - Total: 18,876
  - Density: 163.7/km^{2} (424.0/sq mi)
- Time zone: UTC+01:00 (CET)
  - Summer (DST): UTC+02:00 (CEST)
- Postal codes: 33014
- Dialling codes: 05253, 05259, 05238
- Vehicle registration: HX, WAR
- Website: www.bad-driburg.de

Bad Driburg (German: [baːt ˈdʁiːˌbʊʁk]) is a town and spa in Höxter district in North Rhine-Westphalia, Germany, situated on the river Aa and the Altenbeken–Kreiensen railway.

== Geography ==
Bad Driburg lies on the eastern slopes of the Eggegebirge which is roughly 20 km east of Paderborn.

=== Constituent communities ===
Bad Driburg consists of 10 districts:

- Alhausen
- Driburg
- Dringenberg with Siebenstern
- Erpentrup
- Herste
- Kühlsen
- Langeland
- Neuenheerse
- Pömbsen with Bad Hermannsborn
- Reelsen

== History ==
=== Prehistory ===
Archaeological finds bear witness to settlement in the Driburg area between about 3000 and 1800 BC, in the Middle and New Stone Age.

Further important finds from the Bronze Age attest to quite a high culture living in the area between about 1800 and 600 BC.

=== Ancient times ===
Finds of potsherds and above all coins dating up to AD 15 show at least that there was peaceful trade between the Romans and the Cherusci, a Germanic tribe living in the area in antiquity.

=== Middle Ages ===
In 772, Charlemagne began military operations against the Saxons. Shortly thereafter, one of the churches consecrated to Saint Peter was built on the Iburg. This is one of the oldest churches in historic Saxony.

In 868, the Bishop of Paderborn founded the convent at Neuenheerse, now a constituent community of Bad Driburg. The convent church was built much later, in the early 12th century.

After the Bishopric of Paderborn was reorganized in 1231, Driburg became the seat of an archdeaconate. The Driburger Pfennig began to be minted at this time, and has now become a very rare coin (see Coat of arms below). It was also at about this time, or perhaps somewhat later, that Driburg was granted town rights. The document granting them, however, was lost long ago. A document from 1290 nevertheless makes it clear that, by this time, Driburg has town rights.

In the 14th century, the Castle Dringenberg was built. In 1323 Dringenberg, now a constituent community of Bad Driburg, was granted town rights and was seat of the free court until 1765. On 10 April 1345, Bishop Balduin of Paderborn renewed Driburg's town rights.

In 1444, Otto Duke of Braunschweig (Brunswick) destroyed Schloß Iburg (castle) and had it razed.

=== Modern era ===
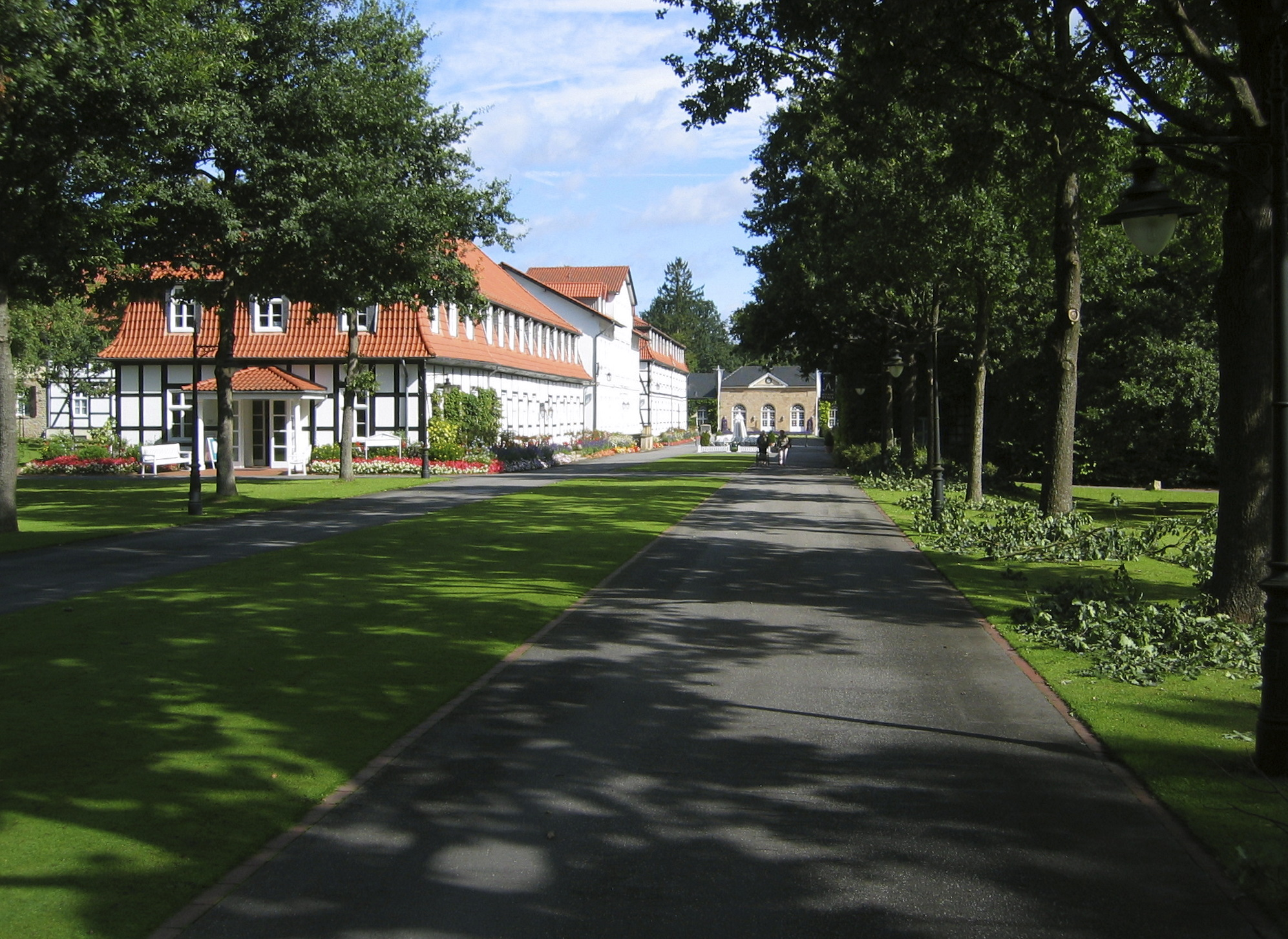
Bad Driburg Spa and Hotel in The Count's Park

About 1500 came the beginnings of glassworks around Driburg. In 1593, the Driburger Heilquellen (healing springs) were once more made usable.

In the next century, two town fires in relatively quick succession—in 1680 and again in 1683—burnt the town to the ground.

The 18th century brought the Seven Years' War between 1756 and 1763, which left a wake of death and destruction. The Franzosengrab ("Frenchmen's Grave") on Brunnenstraße recalls the many victims of the fighting and epidemics.

On 9 May 1781 or 5 April 1782, the Brunswick Oberjägermeister (roughly "High Hunting Master"), Caspar Heinrich von Sierstorpff, founded the Driburg spa, which is still owned today by his descendants, the counts von Oeynhausen-Sierstorpff.

In 1803, Driburg passed to Prussia, and its old connection to the Prince-Bishopric of Paderborn was dissolved. This same year, the Neuenheerse convent became an accommodation centre for needy noblewomen of all denominations.

In 1809, Driburg's Jewish community had its own small synagogue, followed in 1905 by its own private school.

In 1810, after almost a thousand years, the Neuenheerse convent was at last dissolved.

In 1813, the doctor, poet and politician Friedrich Wilhelm Weber, who wrote the epic Dreizehnlinden was born in Alhausen (he died in Nieheim in 1894).

In 1864, Driburg was connected to the railway network. In 1919, Driburg was granted the designation "Bad" in recognition of its being a spa town.

In 1938, the synagogue was destroyed, and the Jewish townsfolk found themselves faced with a time of hardship and persecution under the Nazis.

Towards the end of the Second World War, on 5 April 1945, the town was taken over by American troops. Bad Driburg was largely spared any great war damage. Between 1945 and 1950, the spa was commandeered by the British Occupation authorities. The first postwar spa season came only in 1951.

In 1970 came amalgamation with the heretofore independent communities of Alhausen, Erpentrup, Herste, Langeland, Pömbsen and Reelsen. In 1974 came government recognition as a spa town, although the town had been calling itself Bad Driburg for many years. In 1975 came further amalgamations as the town of Dringenberg and the communities of Kühlsen and Neuenheerse were merged into Bad Driburg.

On 9 May 1981, the spa celebrated its bicentenary. Six years later, on 5 May 1987, the thermal boring was successfully completed. On 1 July 1990, Bad Driburg celebrated its 700-year town jubilee.

On 27 March 1994, the "Driburg Therme" thermal baths opened.

=== Neuenheerse ===
In 868, a convent was established on the site of today's Neuenheerse by Luithard, the third bishop of Paderborn, to foster the Christianization of the Saxons. The church was at first consecrated to Mary, mother of Jesus. The sisters gathered many relics over the years, of which the most important were the bones of Saint Saturnina of Sains-les-Marquion, who became the convent's patron.

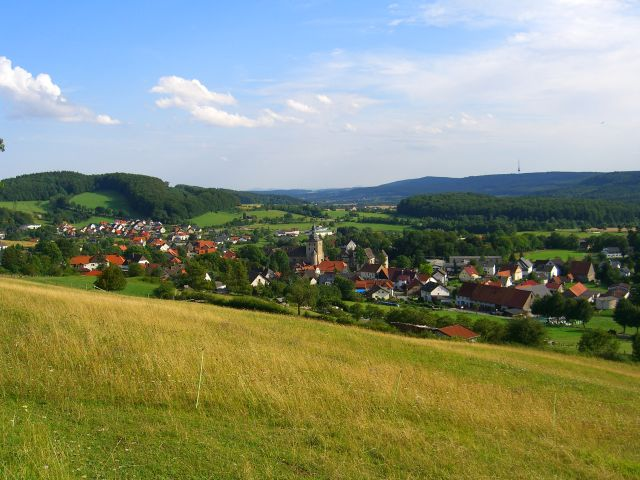
Neuenheerse from the Netheberg

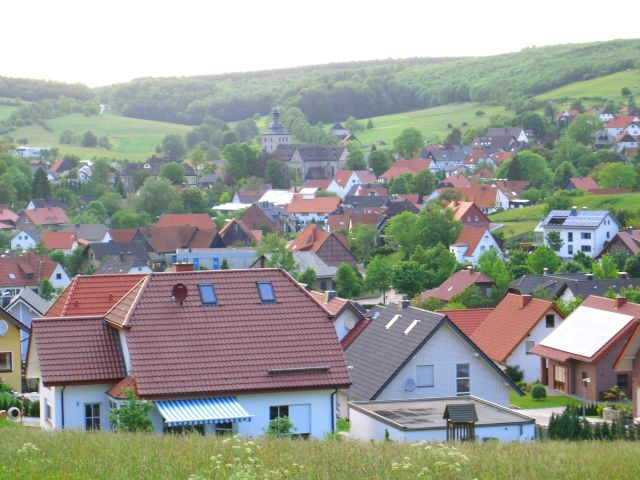
View of Neuenheerse

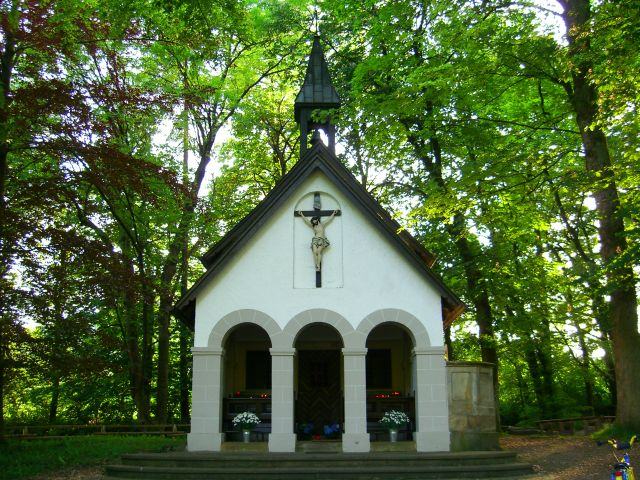
St. Anthony's Chapel (Antoniuskapelle) near Neuenheerse

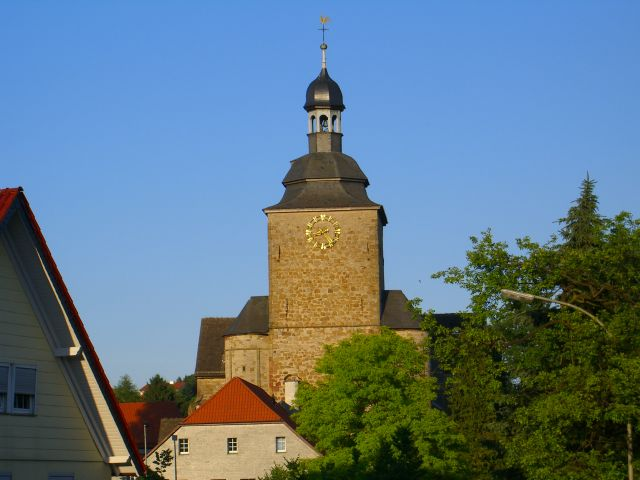
Convent church tower in Neuenheerse

== Population ==
Historical population

Year	Pop.	±% p.a.
1965	15,008	—
1970	16,336	+1.71%
1975	17,477	+1.36%
1980	17,711	+0.27%
1985	17,060	−0.75%
1990	17,525	+0.54%
1995	19,122	+1.76%

Year	Pop.	±% p.a.
2000	19,462	+0.35%
2005	19,502	+0.04%
2010	18,959	−0.56%
2015	18,699	−0.28%
2020	18,902	+0.22%
2025	18,876	−0.03%

Source: Landesdatabank Nordrhein-Westfalen

== Main sights ==
=== Buildings ===
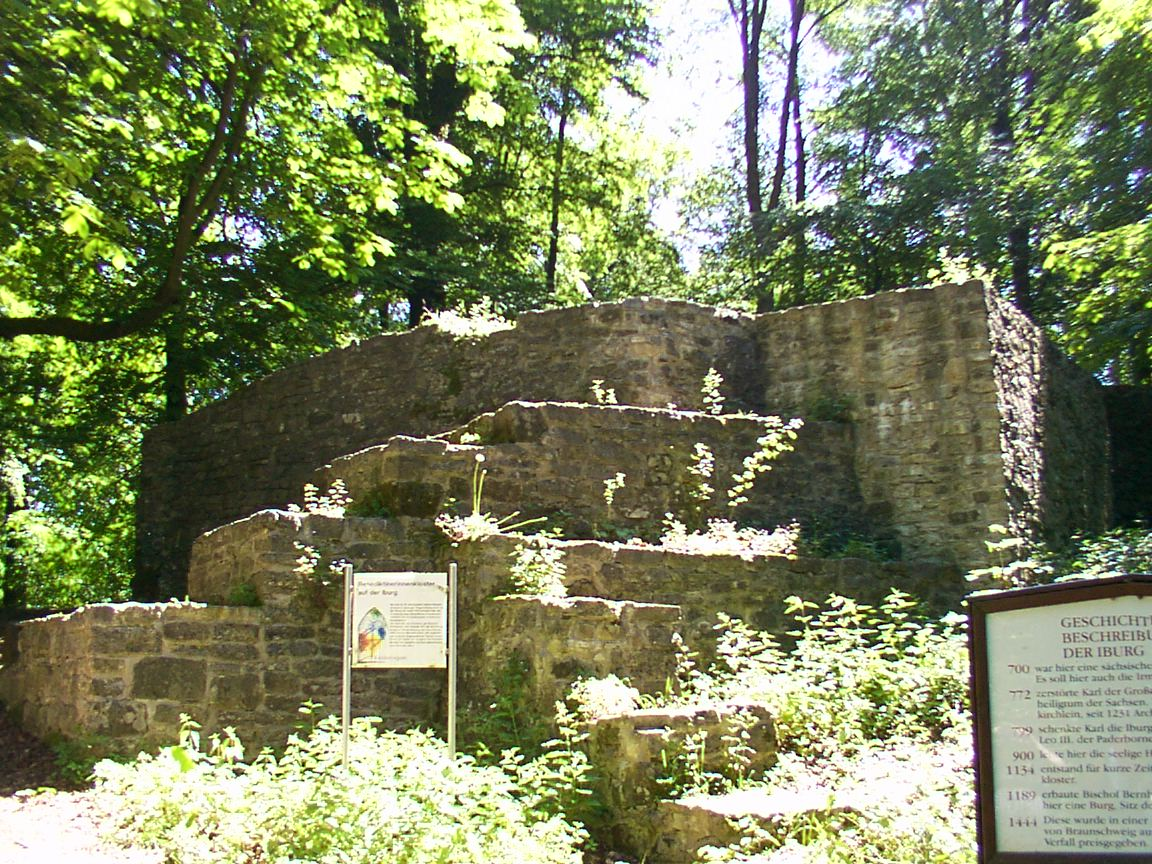
Iburg ruins

- Saint Peter's and Paul's Catholic Parish Church was built in 1894-1897 from A. Güldenpfennig's plans. It is a three-naved neo-Gothic hall church with a transept. It is thoroughly complete with a pulpit, an organ, altars and glazing from the time when it was built. There is also painting from 1909 in a Baroquelike Art Nouveau. A few pieces have been saved from the former church, among them the Romanesque baptismal font (from about 1260), two Baroque figures of the two patron saints from 1676, as well as the late (died 1463) capitular Heinrich von Driburg's gravestone.
- The town's railway station is a late classicist building from after 1860.
- In the town core, which is made up of many new buildings, only a few half-timbered buildings from the 18th and 19th centuries are still standing.
- The Gräfliches Haus (roughly "Count's House") is a two-storey classicist stone building with an outside staircase from 1780, located in the Count's Park with its hotel, conference center and spa. It was here that Beatrix of the Netherlands met her future husband Claus von Amsberg for the first time on New Year's Eve 1962 at a dinner hosted by the count of Oeynhausen-Sierstorpff who was a distant relative of both of them.
- There are heavily restored and made-over remains of the town wall at the so-called Mühlenpforte ("Mill Gate").
- Neuenheerse has a moat-ringed stately home (Wasserschloss).
- The Stiftskirche St. Saturnina ("Convent church of St. Saturnina") in Neuenheerse (Eggedom), was built from 1100 to 1130, but was heavily damaged in a fire due to lightning in 1965.
- The castle Iburg's ruins from the 8th century can be seen in Bad Driburg.

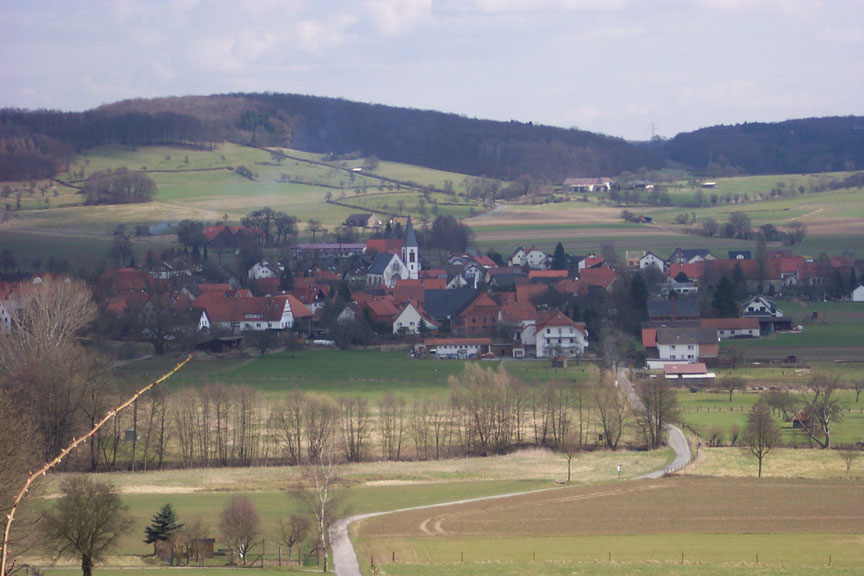
Alhausen seen from the Rosenberg

=== Museums ===
- Modellbahnschau MO187, a model railway display in Bad Driburg's historic goods station.

=== Sports ===
- Bilster Berg Drive Resort is a motorsport racetrack designed by Hermann Tilke, built on a former NATO Rhine Army facility. Opened in 2013, it operates as a country club and hosts track days.

== Cultural events ==
- Shooting festival of the Bad Driburg citizens' shooting guild (2nd weekend in July)
- Shooting festival of the Schützenbruderschaft St. Fabian und Sebastian Neuenheerse e. V. ("Neuenheerse St. Fabian's and Sebastian's Marksmen's Brotherhood") (once a year in mid-August)
- Mountain bike race 'Iburg-Bergsprint' in June, part of the Challenge4MTB race series

== Politics ==
=== Mayors ===
The mayor of Bad Driburg is Tobias Tölle (Independent). He was elected in 2025 with 62,8 % in the runoff election.

=== Town council ===
	CDU	SPD	AfD	UWG	ödp	Greens	FDP	The Left	total
2014	17	6	–	2	2	3	1	1	32
2020	15	6	2	1	2	6	2	–	34
2025	14	5	7	2	2	3	1	–	34

=== Coat of arms ===
Bad Driburg's civic coat of arms might heraldically be described thus: In azure a crenellated town wall and gate over which a crenellated tower Or, above the wall sinister a Latin cross Or.

This tower has been a symbol of Driburg for almost 800 years, and it can even be seen on the "Driburg Pfennig", which was struck in 1215, and of which only two examples are known today. The cross stands for Paderborn, to which Bad Driburg once belonged.

A similar coat of arms in gules (red) rather than azure (blue) was granted on 6 July 1908, but in 1973, the red was changed to blue, and the cross, formerly a cross pattée, became a Latin cross.

This newer version was approved by the Regierungspräsident in Detmold on 9 May 1973.

== Education ==
- Gem. Grundschule
- Katholische Grundschule
- Katholische Grundschule Neuenheerse
- Gemeinschaftsgrundschule Dringenberg
- Städtische Grundschule
- Städtisches Gymnasium
- Gymnasium St. Xaver
- Gymnasium St. Kaspar
- Caspar-Heinrich-Schule Gemeinschafts-Hauptschule der Stadt Bad Driburg
- Friedrich-Wilhelm-Weber-Realschule der Stadt Bad Driburg
- Städtische Schule für Lernbehinderte

== Notable people ==
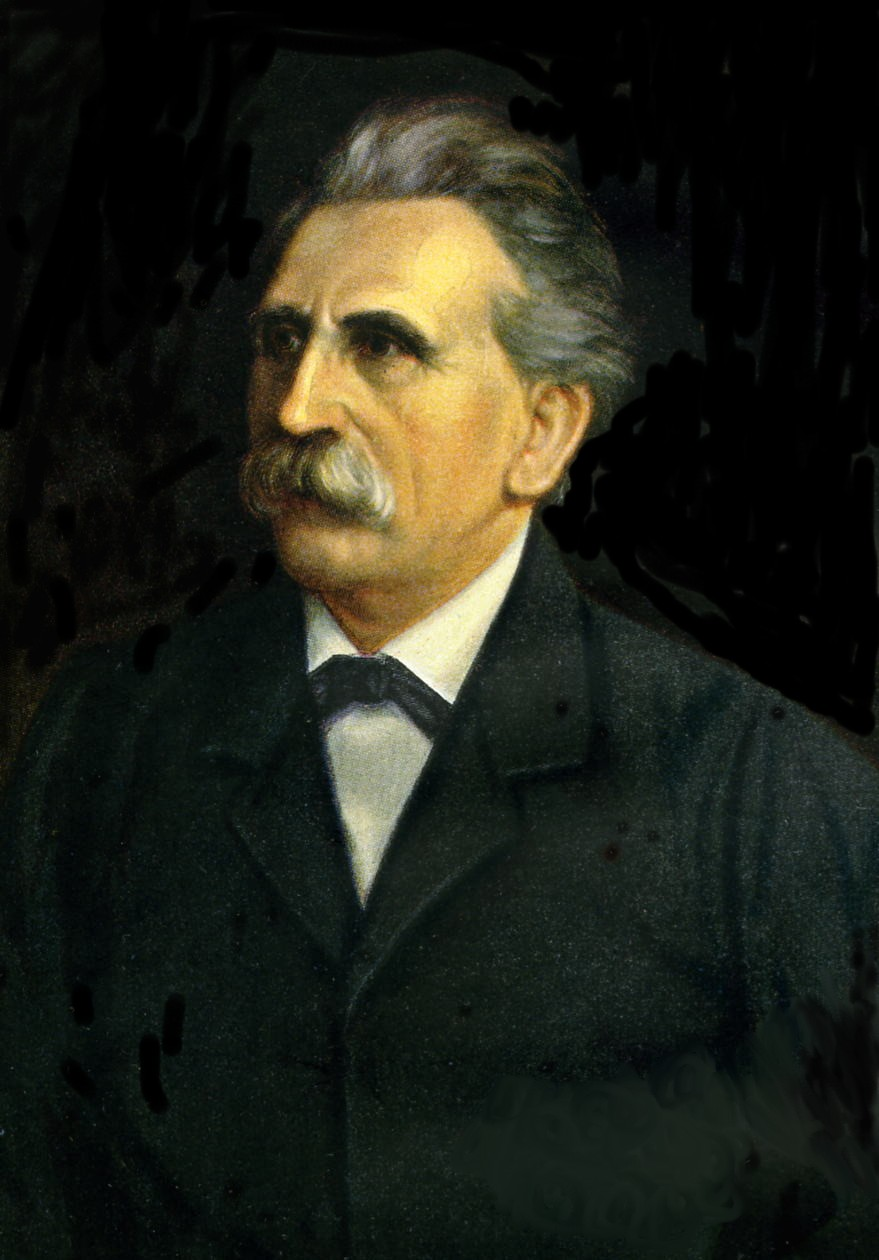
Friedrich Wilhelm Weber

- Friedrich Wilhelm Weber (1813–1894), doctor and poet of Dreizehnlinden , member of the Prussian Landtag for the constituency Höxter / Warburg 1862–1893
- Lilli Schwarzkopf (born 1983), heptathlete, lives in Bad Driburg (district Siebenstern), participated in the Olympic Summer Games 2008 in Beijing and 2012 in London.

== Town partnerships ==
The partnership with Uebigau (citizens' shooting guild) in southwestern Brandenburg has existed since 1990.
