= Nethe =

River in Germany

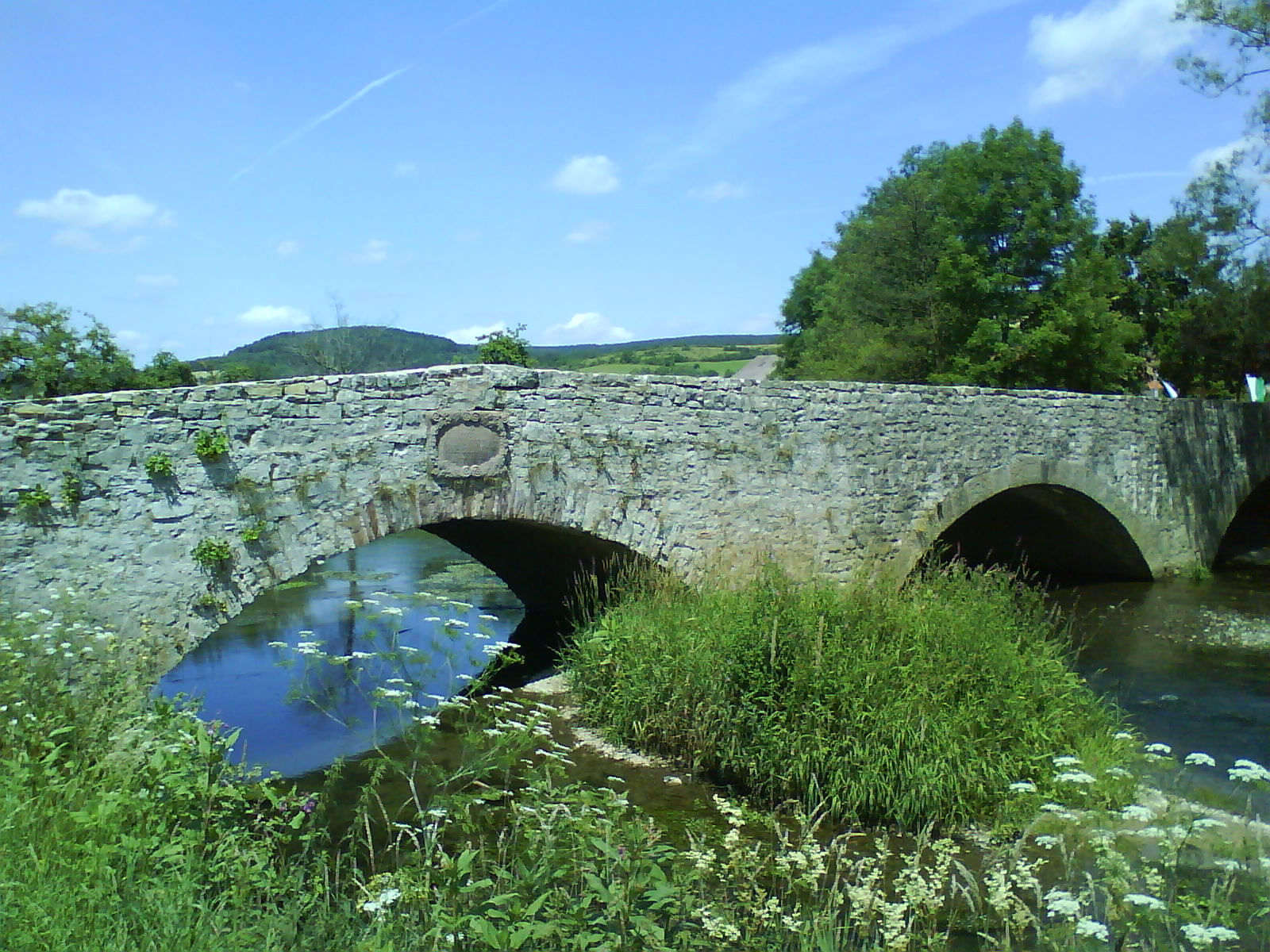

Location
- Country: Germany
- State: North Rhine-Westphalia

Physical characteristics
- Mouth
  - location: Weser
  - coordinates: 51.7375°N 9.3782°E
- Length: 50.3 km (31.3 mi)
- Basin size: 460 km^{2} (180 sq mi)

Basin features
- Progression: Weser→ North Sea

Nethe is a river of North Rhine-Westphalia, Germany. It flows into the Weser near Höxter.

== See also ==
- List of rivers of North Rhine-Westphalia
