= Elpenbach =

River in Germany

Coordinates: 51°31′19″N 6°52′30″E

Location
- Country: Germany
- State: North Rhine-Westphalia

Physical characteristics
- Mouth: Hauptkanal Sterkrade

Basin features
- Progression: Hauptkanal Sterkrade→ Emscher→ Rhine→ North Sea

The Elpenbach is a river of North Rhine-Westphalia, Germany.] It flows into the Hauptkanal Sterkrade in Oberhausen-Sterkrade.

== See also ==
- List of rivers of North Rhine-Westphalia
