= Hauptkanal Sterkrade =

River in Germany

- Interactive map of Hauptkanal Sterkrade

Specifications
- Length: 5.4 km (3.4 miles)

Geography
- Start point: Oberhausen-Sterkrade
- End point: Handbach (Emscher tributary) (51.5148°N 6.8158°E)

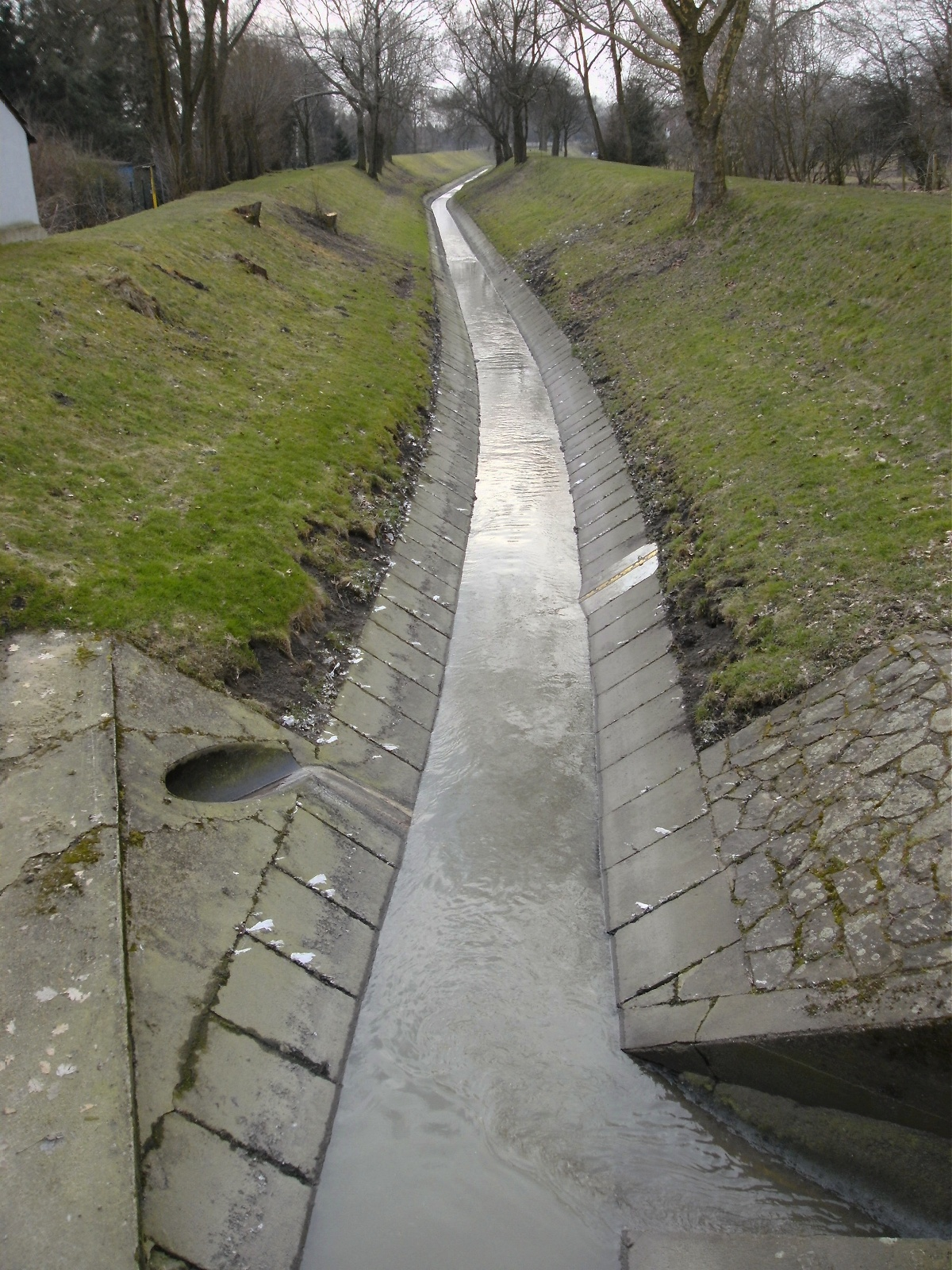
The drain canal.

Hauptkanal Sterkrade is a drainage canal near Oberhausen, North Rhine-Westphalia, Germany. It discharges into the Emscher via the Handbach.

== See also ==
- List of rivers of North Rhine-Westphalia
