= Eichhagen station =

Railway station in Olpe, Germany

Eichhagen
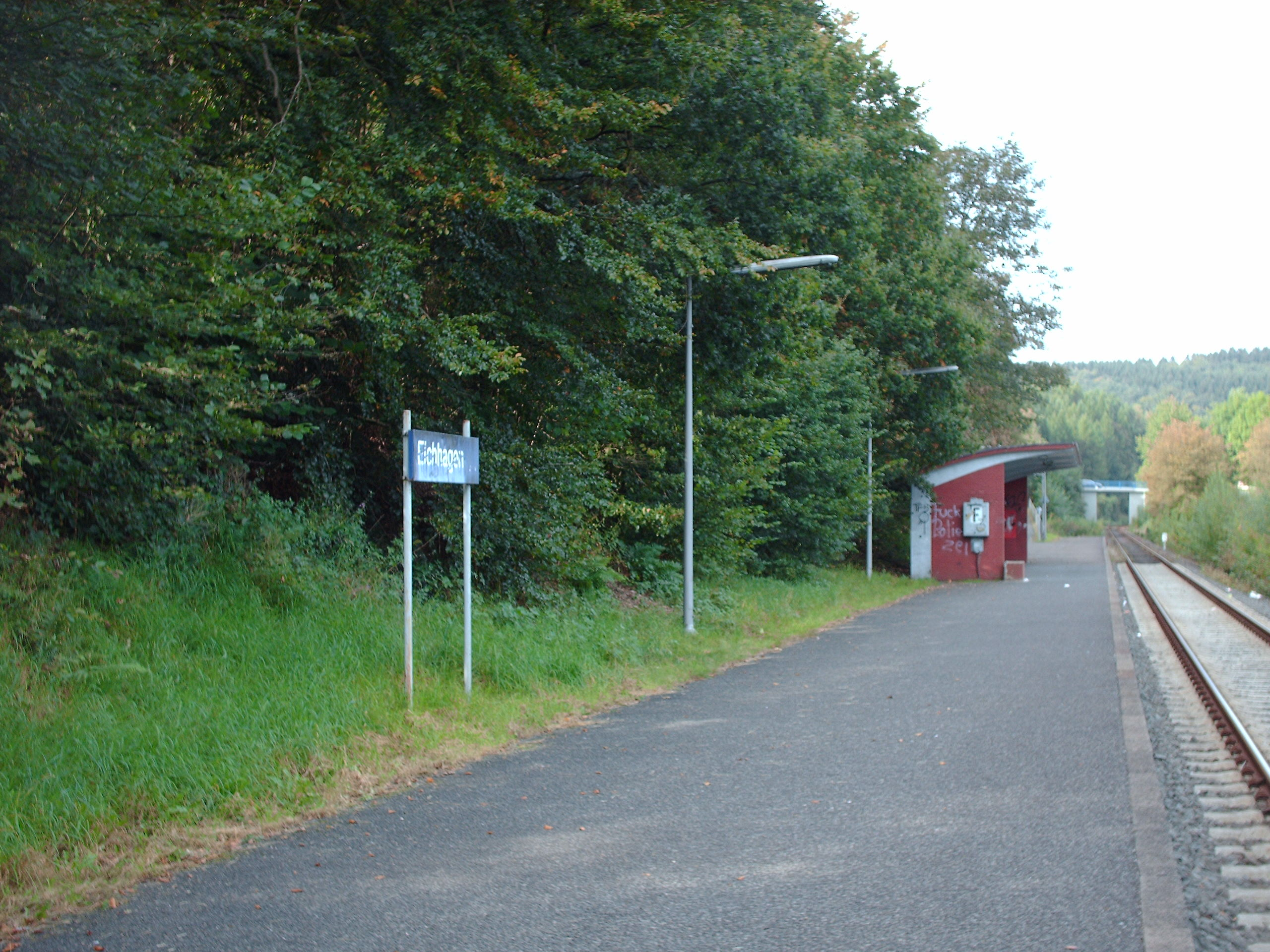
- 2007

General information
- Location: Stader Straße; L512; 57462 Eichhagen; North Rhine-Westphalia; Germany
- Coordinates: 51.0582°N 7.8370°E
- System: Hp
- Owner: Deutsche Bahn
- Operator: DB Netz; DB Station&Service
- Lines: Finnentrop–Freudenberg railway (KBS 442)
- Platforms: 1 side platform
- Tracks: 1
- Train operators: Hessische Landesbahn
- Connections: RB 92

Construction
- Parking: no
- Cycle facilities: no
- Accessible: yes

Other information
- Station code: 1501
- DS100 code: EEHG
- IBNR: 8001706
- Category: 6
- Fare zone: Westfalentarif: 80506
- Website: www.bahnhof.de

Services
Preceding station	Hessische Landesbahn	Following station
Olpe Terminus	RB 92	Sondern towards Finnentrop
Location
- Location within North Rhine-Westphalia Location within Germany Location within Europe

Eichhagen station (German: Haltepunkt Eichhagen) is a railway station in the municipality of Eichhagen, located in the Olpe district in North Rhine-Westphalia, Germany.

== Notable places nearby ==
- Biggesee
