= Schrage =

Schrage is a surname. Notable people with the surname include:

- Calvin Schrage (born 1991), American politician
- Dave Schrage, American college baseball coach
- Elliot Schrage (born 1960), American lawyer and business executive
- Josef Schrage (1881-1953), German trade union official and politician
- Joseph Schrage (1818-1892), American farmer
- Lisa Schrage (born 1956), Canadian actress
- Mike Schrage (born 1976), American basketball coach
- Steven Schrage, American former government official, writer, educator
- Warren Schrage (1920–1999), American professional basketball player

Other uses

- Schrage (G.I. Joe), a fictional character in the G.I. Joe universe

== See also ==
- Schrager
