= Olpe station =

Railway station in Olpe, Germany

Olpe
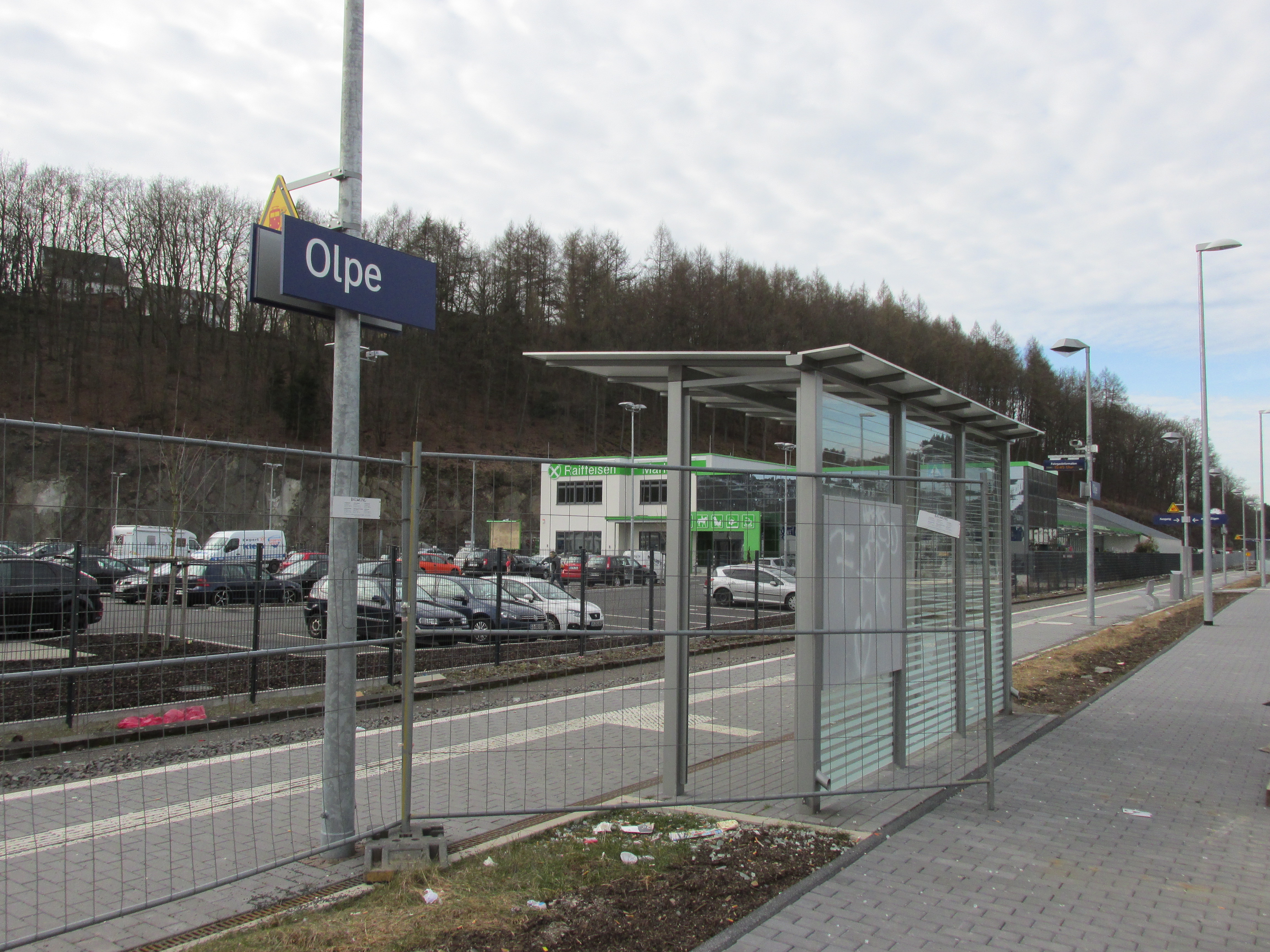
- 2015

General information
- Location: Am Bahnhof; 57462 Olpe; North Rhine-Westphalia; Germany
- Coordinates: 51.030°N 7.840°E
- System: Hp
- Owner: Deutsche Bahn
- Operator: DB Netz; DB Station&Service
- Lines: Finnentrop–Freudenberg railway (KBS 442); Siegburg–Olpe railway (KBS 459)
- Platforms: 1 side platform
- Tracks: 1
- Train operators: Hessische Landesbahn
- Connections: RB 92; 301 R42 R49 R50 R51 R52 R53 R90 SB3 L540 L541 L543 L544 L545 L546 L550 L560 L561 L562

Construction
- Parking: yes
- Cycle facilities: no
- Accessible: yes

Other information
- Station code: 4767
- DS100 code: EOLP
- IBNR: 8004674
- Category: 6
- Fare zone: Westfalentarif: 80513
- Website: www.bahnhof.de

Services
Preceding station	Hessische Landesbahn	Following station
Terminus	RB 92	Eichhagen towards Finnentrop
Location
- Location within North Rhine-Westphalia Location within Germany Location within Europe

Olpe station (German: Haltepunkt Olpe) is a railway station in the municipality of Olpe, located in the Olpe district in North Rhine-Westphalia, Germany.
