= Schrager =

Schrager is a surname. Notable people with the surname include:

- Daphne Schrager (born 2000), British para-cyclist
- Ian Schrager (born 1946), American hotelier and real estate developer
- James E. Schrager, American academic
- Peter Schrager (born 1982), American sports journalist
- Sheldon Schrager (born 1931), American film producer

== See also ==
- Schrage
