= Efrem Hill =

American football player (born 1983)

No. 5, 15, 80
- Position: Wide receiver

Personal information
- Born: July 23, 1983 (age 43); Birmingham, Alabama, U.S.
- Listed height: 6 ft 0 in (1.83 m)
- Listed weight: 188 lb (85 kg)

Career information
- High school: North Springs
- College: Samford
- NFL draft: 2005: undrafted

Career history
- Carolina Panthers (2005–2006); Tampa Bay Buccaneers (2007)*; Cleveland Browns (2007); Edmonton Eskimos (2009–2010); Saskatchewan Roughriders (2011–2012); Georgia Fire (2014)*
- * Offseason or practice squad member only

Awards and highlights
- 2003 OVC Male Athlete of the Year; 2003 Consensus All-American; 2003 OVC Offensive Player of the Year; 2002 I-AA All-Independent First-Team Offense

Career CFL statistics
- Receptions: 100
- Receiving yards: 1,184
- Receiving touchdowns: 2
- Stats at CFL.ca (archived)

Efrem Dale Hill (born July 23, 1983) is an American former professional football player who was a wide receiver in the National Football League (NFL) and Canadian Football League (CFL). He was signed as an undrafted free agent by the Carolina Panthers in 2005. He played college football for the Samford Bulldogs. Hill was also a member of the Tampa Bay Buccaneers, Cleveland Browns, Edmonton Eskimos, Saskatchewan Roughriders and Georgia Fire.

== Early life ==
Hill attended North Springs High School in Atlanta, Georgia. During his senior season, he had 680 yards passing and 943 yards rushing. Hill started at quarterback from his sophomore-senior seasons, earning the team's Best Back Award for two consecutive seasons and the Coach's Corner Award. Hill was a three-sport athlete at North Springs, also playing baseball and basketball. He was a member of North Fulton's Super 11, he helped lead North Springs to the quarterfinal round and an eighth-place finish in the state. He placed ninth in the state in the triple jump with a height of 43' 13".

== College career ==
While at Samford, Hill majored in Business.

=== Freshman (2001) ===
In 2001, Hill finished second on the team in receiving with 12 receptions for 114 yards. He had one reception in his first three games, catching one for 11 yards against Chattanooga, one for 10 yards against Nicholls State and one for a season-long 24 yards against Jacksonville State. He had two receptions in each of the next three games. He had two receptions for 12 yards against Charleston Southern. He had two catches for seven yards against UT-Martin. Hill caught two passes for 23 yards against Elon. He set a career-high with three catches for 27 yards against VMI in the season finale.

=== Sophomore (2002) ===
In 2002, Hill finished second on the team in receiving for the second consecutive season with 569 yards on 39 receptions and six touchdowns. He also returned three kickoffs for 102 yards. Hill finished the season with back-to-back 100-yard receiving games. He caught five passes for 102 yards and one touchdown at Southeast Missouri State. Hill caught a season- and career-high six receptions for 125 yards and two touchdowns at Youngstown State. He was named I-AA Independent Offensive Player of the Week after his performance at Youngstown State.

=== Junior (2003) ===
In 2003, Hill was a consensus All-America selection. He was also, a Walter Payton Award finalist. He was named Ohio Valley Conference Offensive Player of the Year and Male Athlete of the Year.

For the season he had 92 receptions for a school-record 1,387 yards. He led the nation in yards per game, averaging 126.09. Hill led the conference in: receiving yards per game, receptions per game (8.36), scoring (8.2 ppg.) and scoring by touchdown (8.2 ppg.).

Hill caught seven passes for 107 yards and a touchdown at Chattanooga. He caught nine passes for 148 yards and a season-high three touchdowns against West Alabama. He recorded eight receptions for 87 yards at San Diego State. He caught four passes for 104 yards and a 64-yard touchdown at Eastern Kentucky. Hill caught 11 passes for a career-high 223 yards at UT-Martin. He caught eight passes for 95 yards and two touchdowns against Tennessee State. He caught 10 passes for 112 yards at Tennessee Tech. Hill had a school-record 16 receptions for 197 yards and two touchdowns against Jacksonville State. He caught 10 passes for 151 yards and a touchdown at Eastern Illinois.

=== Senior (2004) ===
In 2004, Hill played in all 11 games leading the team in all receiving categories. He was also second on the team in punt returns with six for 50 yards with an average of 8.3 yards per return. Hill recorded nine receptions for 209 yards (long of being 84 yards) and three touchdowns, against West Alabama. He also returned one punt for four yards. Against Georgia Tech Hill had 11 receptions for 83 yards (long of 26 yards) and one touchdown. Against Furman, Hill had 10 receptions for 88 yards (long of 15 yards). In the game against Southeast Missouri, Hill had seven receptions for 84 yards (long of 15 yards). He also returned two punts for 29 yards (long of 24 yards). At Eastern Kentucky, Hill had six receptions for 84 yards (long of 39 yards) and three touchdowns. Against Murray State, Hill had six catches for 95 yards (long of 34 yards) and one touchdown. Against UT-Martin, Hill had two receptions for 25 yards (long of 13 yards). At Tennessee State, Hill had seven catches for 99 yards (long of 31 yards) and one touchdown. Against Tennessee Tech, Hill had six receptions for 163 yards (long of 74 yards) and one touchdown. He also had one punt return for one yard. Against Jacksonville State, Hill had four catches for 28 yards (long of 14 yards). He also returned two punts for 16 yards. In the season finale against Eastern Illinois, Hill had three catches for 28 yards (long of 19 yards).

Then in 2005, after the 2004 bowl season was over, Hill played in The Villages Gridiron Classic College All-Star Game.

=== Career statistics ===
Career Statistics			Receiving				
Year	Team	G	Rec	Yards	Y/R	TD	LNG
2001	Samford Bulldogs	7	12	114	9.5	0	--
2002	11	39	569	14.6	6	--	
2003	11	92	1,387	15.0	15	81	
2004	Samford Bulldogs	11	71	984	13.9	10	84
Total		40	214	3,054	14.3	31	84

== Professional career ==
=== Carolina Panthers ===
In 2005, Hill went undrafted in the 2005 NFL draft. However, he was signed by the Carolina Panthers on April 29, 2005. After being waived from the Panthers on September 3, 2005, he was signed to the Panthers practice squad two days later. He was then signed to the Panthers active roster on December 20, 2005. Hill was then waived by the Panthers on September 2, 2006, he was then signed to the team's practice squad on October 17, 2006.

=== Tampa Bay Buccaneers ===
Hill was signed by the Tampa Bay Buccaneers on January 17, 2007. He was later waived by the Buccaneers on June 25, 2007.

=== Cleveland Browns ===
On June 26, 2007, Hill was claimed off waivers by the Cleveland Browns.

=== Edmonton Eskimos ===
Hill signed with the Edmonton Eskimos on May 20, 2009.

=== Saskatchewan Roughriders ===
On April 20, 2011, it was announced that Hill had signed with the Saskatchewan Roughriders.

== Personal life ==
Hill was married at age 22, and currently has a young daughter and son. He holds the head football coaching position at Discovery High School in Lawrenceville, Georgia. He is also the head coach for Discovery's track team.
