= Biggesee =

Biggesee Dam
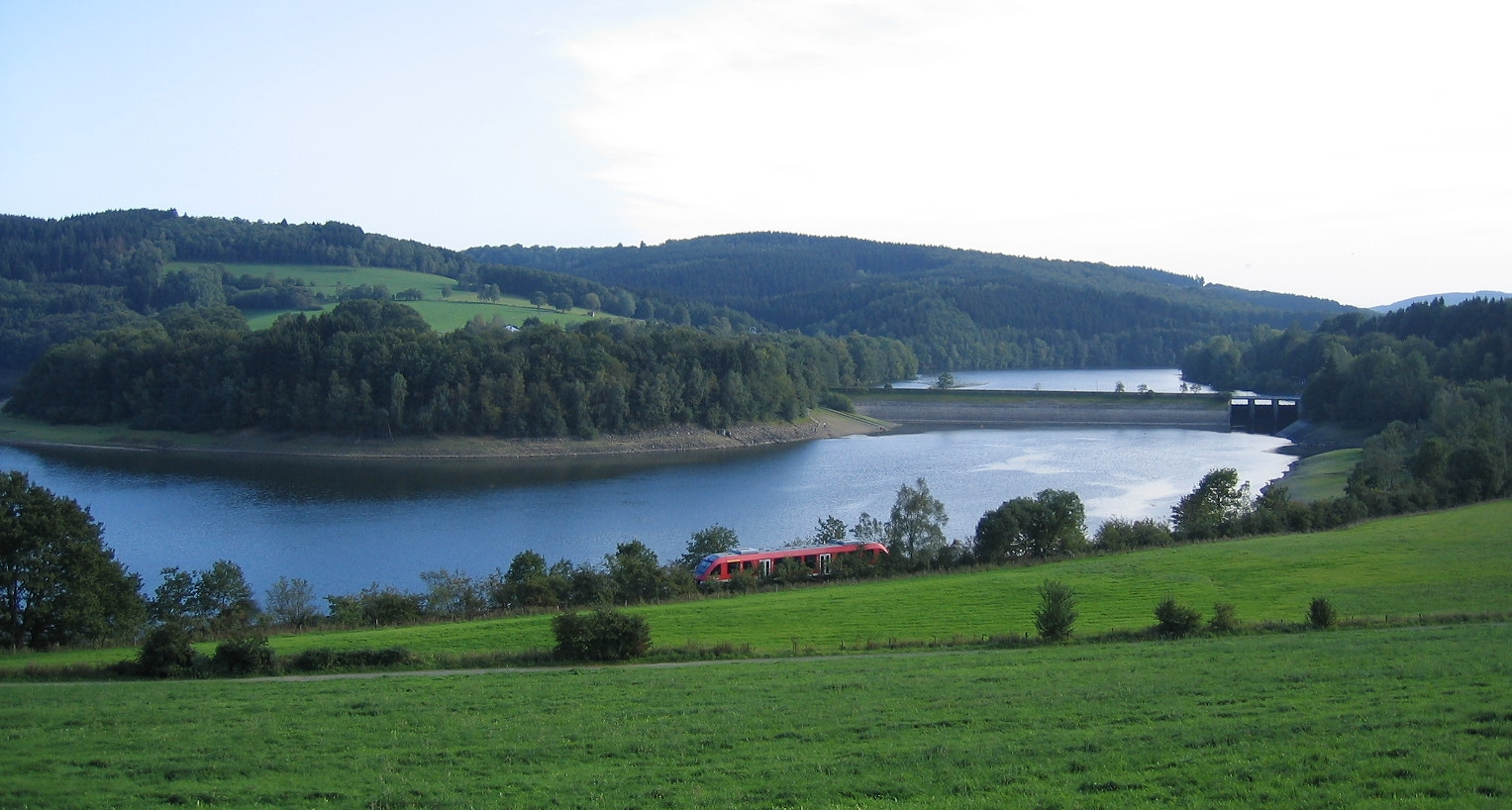
- Interactive map of Biggesee Dam
- Country: Germany
- Location: Sauerland, Olpe
- Coordinates: 51°06′37″N 07°53′45″E
- Construction began: 1956
- Opening date: 1965

Dam and spillways
- Height: 52 m (171 ft)
- Length: 640 m (2,100 ft)
- Width (crest): 10 m
- Width (base): 220 m (720 ft)
- Dam volume: 1,900,000 m3
- Spillway capacity: 347 m³/s

Reservoir
- Total capacity: 171.7 hm³
- Catchment area: 287 km2
- Surface area: 876 ha

Power Station
- Installed capacity: 17.6 MW

The Biggesee or Bigge Reservoir (German: Biggetalsperre) is a reservoir in Germany. It lies in the southern part of the Sauerland between Olpe and Attendorn.

== Purpose ==
The lake serves to regulate the rivers Ruhr and Lenne as well as providing water for the Ruhrgebiet. It is fed from the Bigge, a tributary of the Lenne.

The lake serves primarily to store water for the Ruhrgebiet so as to maintain the same level of water in the Ruhr. The lake can deliver, via the rivers Bigge and Lenne, up to 40% of all the water supplied by all the reservoirs in the river system of the Ruhr combined. A hydroelectric power station produces around 24 million kWh electricity annually. The power of the three large and one small Francis turbines amounts to 17.52 MW. The owner of the lake is the Ruhrverband.

Along with the Listertalsperre, the Biggestausee forms a large reservoir system. The formerly self-standing Listertalsperre joins immediately on to the Biggesee.

In middle of the Biggesee itself is the circa 30 ha (74 acres) Gilberginsel which, together with the neighboring lakeshore area, forms a nature reserve.

== Construction of the Bigge Dam ==
In 1956, the Landtag (parliament) of North Rhine-Westphalia passed a law for the financing of the Bigge Dam.

On 1 August 1956, the Bigge Dam Law came into force. According to this, each municipality was obliged to extract 1.2 pfennigs from every consumer of water for every m^{2} of water they used – the so-called "Biggepfennig" – which went towards financing the construction of the Bigge Dam.

The building of the dam began in 1956 and was finished in 1965, although the planning could be said to reach back as far as 1938. The Listertalsperre, dating from 1912, became an arm of the new reservoir. The complete system encompasses a volume of water of 172 million m^{3}, of which the Biggesee has 150 million and the Listertalsperre 22 million. Therefore, the Biggesee system is the fifth largest reservoir in Germany in terms of capacity. The catchment area of both lakes comprises an area of 289 km^{2} (112 sq mi). The lakes themselves have a surface area of 8.76 km^{2} (3.38 sq mi) with a length of ca. 20 km (12 mi). The deepest point of the Biggesee when the water is at its planned level is about 52 m (171 ft).

Around 2550 people had to be re-settled in the newly built districts of Neu-Listernohl, Sondern-Hanemicke und Eichhagen. New construction included 4.4 km (2.7 mi) of Bundesstraße, 14.8 km (9.2 mi) Landstraße, 18.2 km (11.3 mi) of local roads and 31 km (19 mi) of cycle routes, making altogether 68.4 km^{2} (26.4 sq mi) of new roads and paths. The "Bigge Valley Railway" was likewise newly laid out in the region of the lake. Building of these new traffic routes required eight large bridges and 24 smaller ones.

== Tourism ==
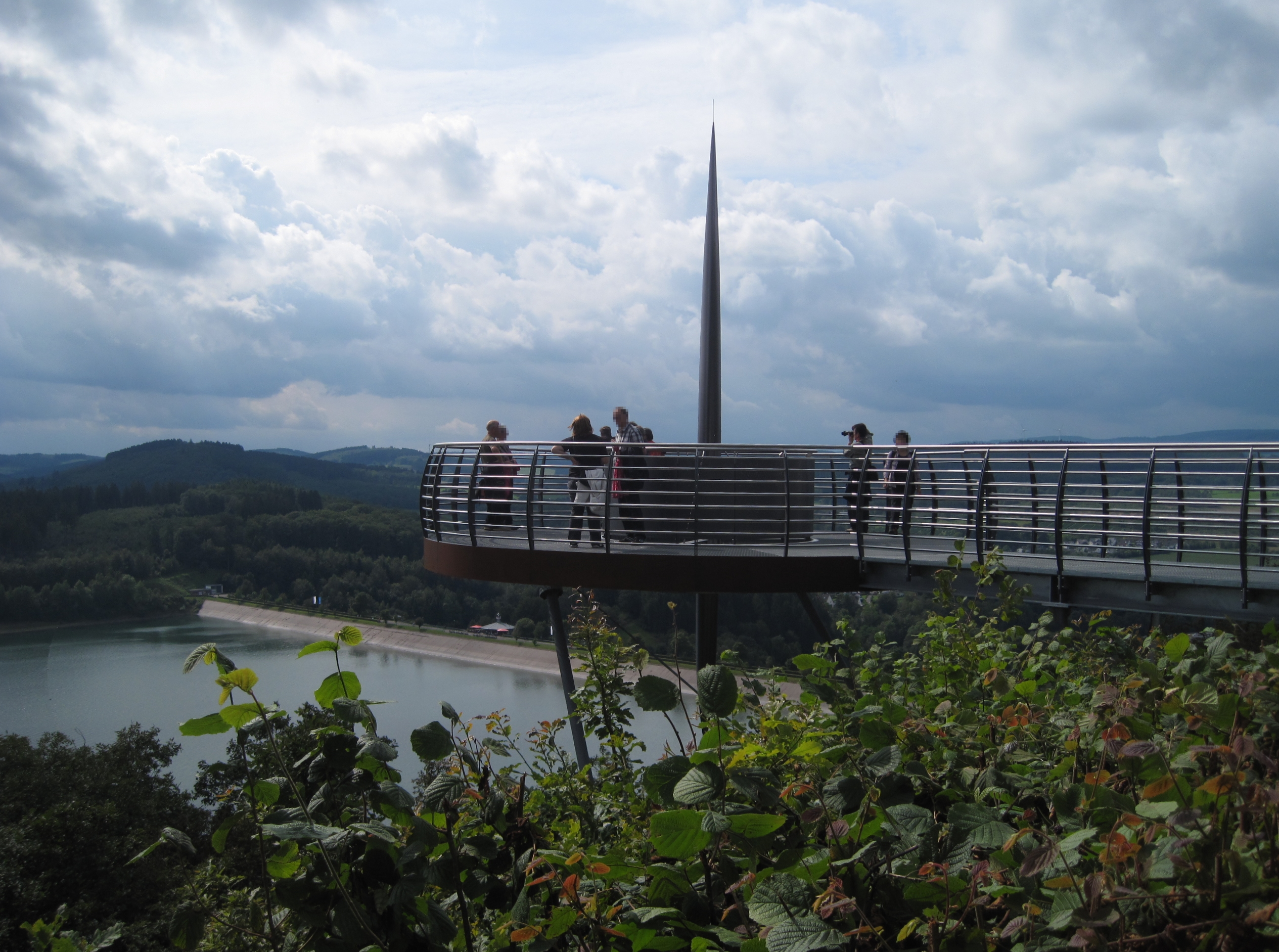
Skywalk Biggeblick

Over the years, the lakes have become a tourist magnet. Apart from the possibilities for water sports (sailing, surfing, rowing, canoeing, fishing and diving), two passenger ships ply the lake at the moment. Previously there had been four - three on the main lake and a canal boat on the upper reservoir. There are two official diving areas, the Weuste and the Kraghammer Sattel, as well as a diving school in the camping area at "Sonderner Kopf". Additionally, there numerous cycle and hiking routes round the lake and its environs. These are especially well-used during the summer. Many holidaymakers move their quarters around the different camping sites along the lake. The Bigge Dam belongs to The Industrial Heritage Trail, and indeed to the Theme Route 12: Ruhr - Past and Present.

== Transport ==
=== Rail and bus ===
The Biggesee lies on the single-line Bigge Valley Railway (KBS 442), on which the Biggesee-Express (RB 92) travels hourly from Olpe, stopping a few times close to the lakeshore, and on to Finnentrop with a connection to the Ruhr-Lenne-Express (RE 16). In Sondern there is a lake station which allows direct transfer from the train on to a passenger ship. This is the only lake station in North Rhine-Westphalia.

Two multilevel bridges over two arms of the lake form a distinguishing architectural feature. The railway line runs on the lower level, with the road above. Both bridges are to be found about 1 and 1.5 Kilometers (ca 1 mi.) east of the Listertal-Staumauer.

With respect to road transport, buses reach the Biggesee. The relevant operator are the VWS based in Siegen, a subsidiary of the Stadtwerke Bonn, and BRS (Busverkehr Rhein-Sieg GmbH). Apart from that, buses from the "Regionalverkehr Köln" company travel along the Biggesee.

Rail and road transport is grouped together in the Verkehrsgemeinschaft Westfalen-Süd|Verkehrsgemeinschaft Westfalen-Süd (VGWS).

=== Roads ===
The Biggesee can be reached by two federal motorways:

- the A 4 (E 40) Aachen – Görlitz. Connection: Wenden (autobahn junction Olpe-Süd) and
- the A 45 (Sauerlandlinie) (E 41) Dortmund–Aschaffenburg. Connection: (18) Olpe, (17) Drolshagen und (16) Meinerzhagen

as well as the Bundesstraßen B 54 Hagen–Olpe–Siegen, B 55 Olpe–Lennestadt–Meschede.

Furthermore, the Landstraße 512 runs along the left bank from Olpe to Attendorn.

=== Cruises ===
There is a cruise that you can take on the Biggesee. The ride is operated from April until the end of October, during which two ships of the Personenschifffahrt Biggesee ply the lake. A round trip takes ca. 2 hours. The Ships stop at five Stops along the way, including the two on the way back. You can also rent the ships for any purpose you like.

=== Cycle tracks ===
There is an extensive cycle track network around the Biggesee and the Listertalsperre.

=== Walking routes ===
There is a variety of marked walking routes around the lakes, IVV-round routes in Olpe.

== See also ==
- List of lakes in Germany
- List of reservoirs and dams in Germany

== Literature ==
- Franke, Peter; Frey, Wolfgang (1987), Talsperren in der Bundesrepublik Deutschland (in German), DNK - DVWK, ISBN 3-926520-00-0
