= Steven Schrage =

Personal details
- Born: Steven Patrick Schrage Scott Air Force Base, Illinois, U.S.
- Party: Republican
- Education: Duke University (BA); University of Michigan (JD); Harvard University; Trinity Hall, Cambridge (PhD)

Steven Patrick Schrage is a former State Department, Congressional, and think tank official. He has appeared or provided comments on foreign affairs and politics for major media outlets including NBC Nightly News, Fox News, the BBC, the Washington Post, and the New York Times.

Schrage was the executive director of the Commission on Security and Cooperation in Europe from March 24, 2023 to April 18, 2024, when he left his post following a broad investigation into staff conduct undertaken during a period of intense internal strife among Commission staff. Kyle Parker (congressional staffer), the senior Senate adviser on the Commission, was the subject of the investigation, which looked into his frequent trips to Ukraine's war zones and his acknowledgement that he provided $30,000 in sniper gear to its military.

== Early life and education ==
Steven Schrage was born at Scott Air Force Base in Illinois while his father Dan Schrage was stationed in Europe overseeing MGR-1 Honest John nuclear weapons targeting Communist forces in Eastern Europe and Russia. Schrage’s father graduated from the United States Military Academy, where he was captain of a basketball team that included future U.S. Olympic coaches, point guard Mike Krzyzewski and coach Robert Knight, and later served as an Army Ranger and helicopter pilot in Vietnam.

Schrage moved from Illinois in 1984 when his father became a professor at the Georgia Institute of Technology in Atlanta. He is an honors graduate of North Springs High School, Duke University (1991) and the University of Michigan Law School (1995), where he was also selected to serve in an externship in the State Department’s Office of the Legal Adviser. Following several years in government and private sector positions, Schrage began MBA studies at Harvard Business School in 1998; before completing the program, Schrage took a leave of absence to serve in the 2000 presidential campaign and government roles noted below. Schrage returned to Harvard in 2012 as an Institute of Politics Fellow. From 2013 to 2019, he studied under Professor Stefan Halper at Trinity Hall, Cambridge, working on a PhD in Politics and International Studies which he completed in 2019. The thesis, entitled "How Presidential Campaign Decisions on Foreign Policy Positions and Advisers are Made and Can Reshape International Relations: A Bush 2000 Case Study" remains under embargo. While at Cambridge, Schrage organized a conference that brought together his thesis adviser Stefan Halper with Trump adviser Carter Page. Schrage later wrote an article entitled "The Spies who Hijacked America" which outlined a conspiracy theory asserting that Halper and other UK-based officials formed a secret "Cambridge Four" that "undermined democracy and the US-UK relationship". At Cambridge, he received support from Trinity Hall’s Atlantic Fund studentship. He is a life member of the Council on Foreign Relations.

== Government service and career ==
Between 1996 and 1997, Schrage served on the personal staff of U.S. Senator and former Peace Corps Director Paul Coverdell, during Coverdell's tenure on the Senate Foreign Relations Committee. During the 2000 presidential campaign, he worked on George W. Bush’s policy team in Austin, Texas and later served on the White House transition team. Schrage was appointed Senior Advisor in the Office of the U.S. Trade Representative (USTR). Schrage then rotated to a position with the Undersecretary for Economic Affairs at the State Department. In 2002 he was appointed as Deputy Assistant Secretary for Crime in the Bureau of International Narcotics and Law Enforcement Affairs. He and his staff were responsible for executing global anticrime programs and supporting a network of International Law Enforcement Academies training foreign law enforcement in criminal, border security, anticorruption and other matters. In this official role, he addressed a UN committee on global crime and terrorism matters after 9/11 and testified once before Congress on combatting transnational crime and corruption in Europe. Several months into his assignment, Schrage succeeded Elizabeth Verville as Co-Chair of the U.S. delegation to the G8 Anti-Crime and Terrorism Group. In this role, in coordination with INL program officer Maren Brooks he co-led working level delegations from the Departments of Justice, Homeland Security and Treasury, and co-chaired a U.S. meeting of the Crime and Terrorism group with U.S. allies in 2004. Upon Schrage's 2004 departure, Verville, who had played a role in negotiating the UN Convention against Transnational Organized Crime (UNTOC), and the UN Convention against Corruption (UNCAC), reassumed co-chair responsibilities for the group.

Between 2005 and early 2007, Schrage served as International Trade Counsel for the House Ways and Means Committee, where he was the point person for homeland security and border issues, the adoption of new labor and environmental standards in U.S. trade agreements, and for the successful bipartisan passage of several new Free Trade Agreements. In 2007 he was named Foreign Policy and Trade Director for then-Governor Mitt Romney’s presidential campaign and was responsible for working with the candidate and other experts to develop the candidate’s foreign policy and national security positions, speeches, and statements, including Romney’s major foreign policy address hosted by President George H. W. Bush in Texas and his 2008 foreign affairs article laying out Romney 2008 foreign policy vision.

In 2008, Schrage was appointed Scholl Chair in International Business at the Center for Strategic and International Studies in Washington DC, a global think tank voted as the top international security think tank for eight years running. His work focused on international economic, security, politics, and strategic issues after the 2008 financial crisis, and his comments appeared in major media television and newspaper pieces.

From February 2010 to January 2011, Schrage served as Chief of Staff for incoming Massachusetts Senator Scott Brown, the first Senator elected during the 2010s Tea Party wave, who became the deciding vote for breaking Senate filibusters and played a crucial role in legislation including the landmark Dodd-Frank reforms. Senator Brown was elected to serve in the seat held for forty-six years by Massachusetts Senator Ted Kennedy. During the time Schrage was his chief of staff, Senator Brown won praise for his bipartisanship and held some of the strongest approval ratings or any U.S. Senator, even though he was a Republican in a heavily Democratic state.

Schrage was the executive director of the Commission on Security and Cooperation in Europe from March 24, 2023 to April 18, 2024, when he left his post following a broad investigation into staff conduct undertaken during a period of intense internal strife among Commission staff.
