= Finnentrop station =

Railway station in Finnentrop, Germany

Finnentrop
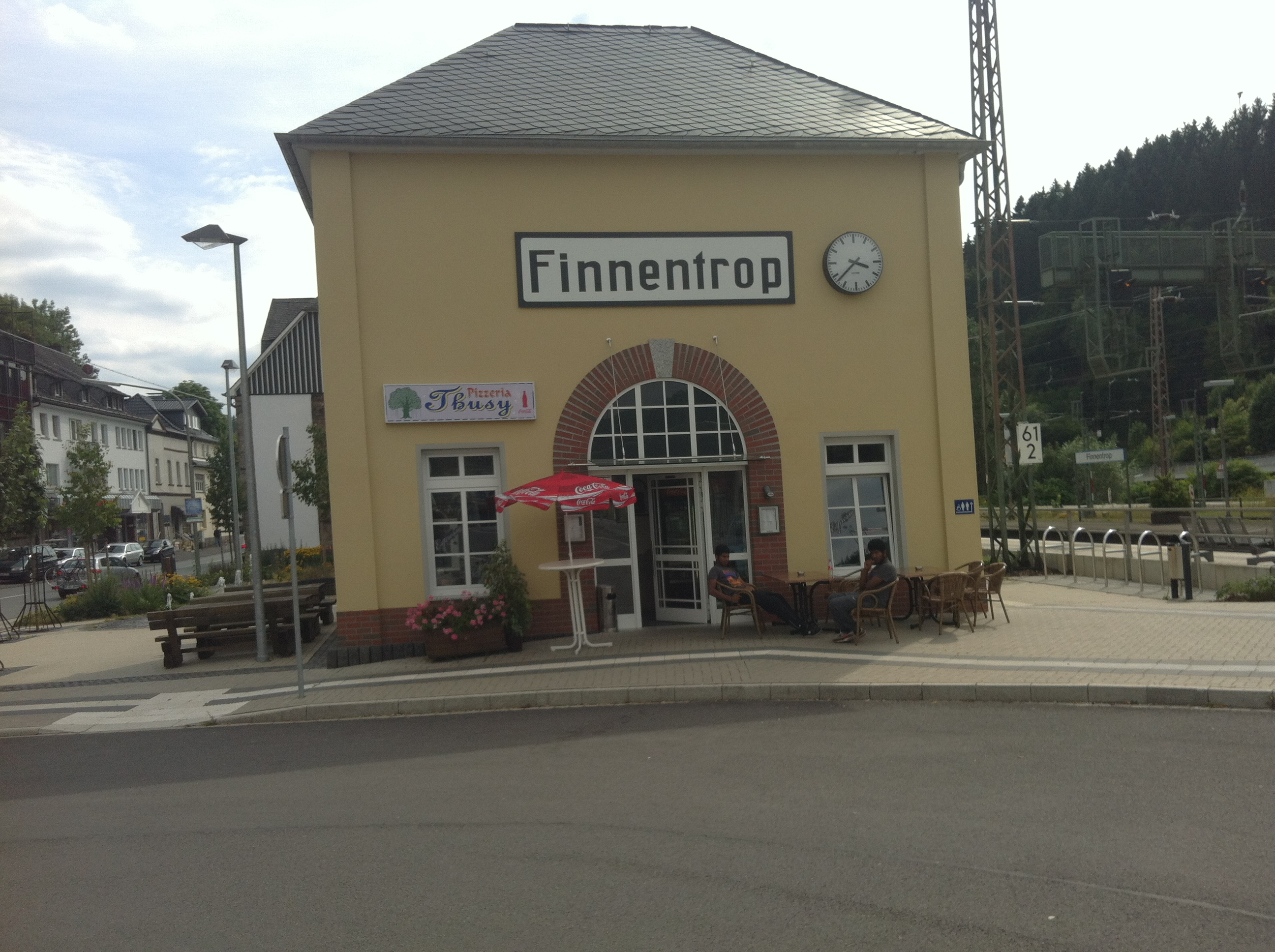
- Finnentrop station

General information
- Location: Bamenohler Straße 247, Finnentrop, North Rhine-Westphalia; Germany
- Coordinates: 51°10′22″N 7°57′52″E
- Owner: Deutsche Bahn
- Operator: DB Netz; DB Station&Service
- Lines: Ruhr–Sieg railway; Finnentrop–Freudenberg railway; former Finnentrop–Wennemen railway
- Platforms: 4

Construction
- Accessible: Yes

Other information
- Station code: 1793
- DS100 code: EFP
- IBNR: 8000102
- Category: 4
- Fare zone: Westfalentarif: 80112
- Website: www.bahnhof.de

History
- Opened: 6 August 1861

Services
Preceding station	DB Fernverkehr	Following station
Plettenberg towards Dortmund Hbf or Münster Hbf	IC 34	Lennestadt-Grevenbrück towards Frankfurt (Main) Hbf or Friedberg (Hess)
Preceding station	DB Regio NRW	Following station
Plettenberg towards Dortmund Hbf	RE 34	Lennestadt-Grevenbrück towards Siegen Hbf
Preceding station	Hessische Landesbahn	Following station
Heggen towards Olpe	RB 92	Terminus
Preceding station	VIAS	Following station
Plettenberg towards Hagen Hbf	RB 91	Lennestadt-Grevenbrück towards Siegen
Location
- Location within North Rhine-Westphalia Location within Germany Location within Europe

Finnentrop station is a railway junction on the Ruhr–Sieg railway between Hagen and Siegen in the German state of North Rhine-Westphalia. The station is located on the territory of the municipality of Finnentrop in the district of Olpe. The Bigge Valley Railway to Olpe branches off here and it was also the start of the Finnentrop–Wennemen railway, which was closed in 1996. It is classified by Deutsche Bahn as a category 4 station.

== History ==
Finnentrop station was established during the construction of the Ruhr–Sieg line from 1858 to 1861 and the station buildings were completed in 1860. Located in the village of Neubrucke, it was called Finnentrop after a nearby estate and the district was given the same name in 1908. The first entrance building was built in 1870. This was replaced by a new building in 1898 because of increasing traffic and then served until its demolition in 1937 as housing for railway families. A locomotive depot was built in the 1870s in conjunction with the building of the branch lines to Olpe and Wennemen. However, only one locomotive was stationed there in 1892. Together with Altenhundem, the station gradually developed into one of the operating centres of the Ruhr–Sieg line. In 1914, after the closure of an on-site locomotive depot at the Finnentrop steel works in 1901, the station's locomotive depot became an independent depot. In the First World War, a field kitchen was set up next to the station and a medical team was established in the station waiting room. After World War II, 660 people were employed at the station.

In 2002, the Deutsche Bahn AG installed a ticket machine in the station building. Two years later, the municipality took over the building. As part of the modernisation program for stations, North Rhine-Westphalia invested about €1 million in the remodeling of the station. In late 2007, during the first phase the station building was demolished and the station forecourt was completely redesigned. A citizens' initiative had previously made proposals for new uses of the building. A new platform access bridge with elevators was erected, the three platforms were raised to 76 cm high and a multi-use platform was built: buses now stop directly opposite the trains now, making a barrier-free transition possible. Further work on the island platforms and on the new pedestrian bridge began in 2015. They were raised and renewed in the southern area. Lifts were installed to the pedestrian overpass on the main platform and on the large island platform. This work was finished in 2017.

== Infrastructure ==
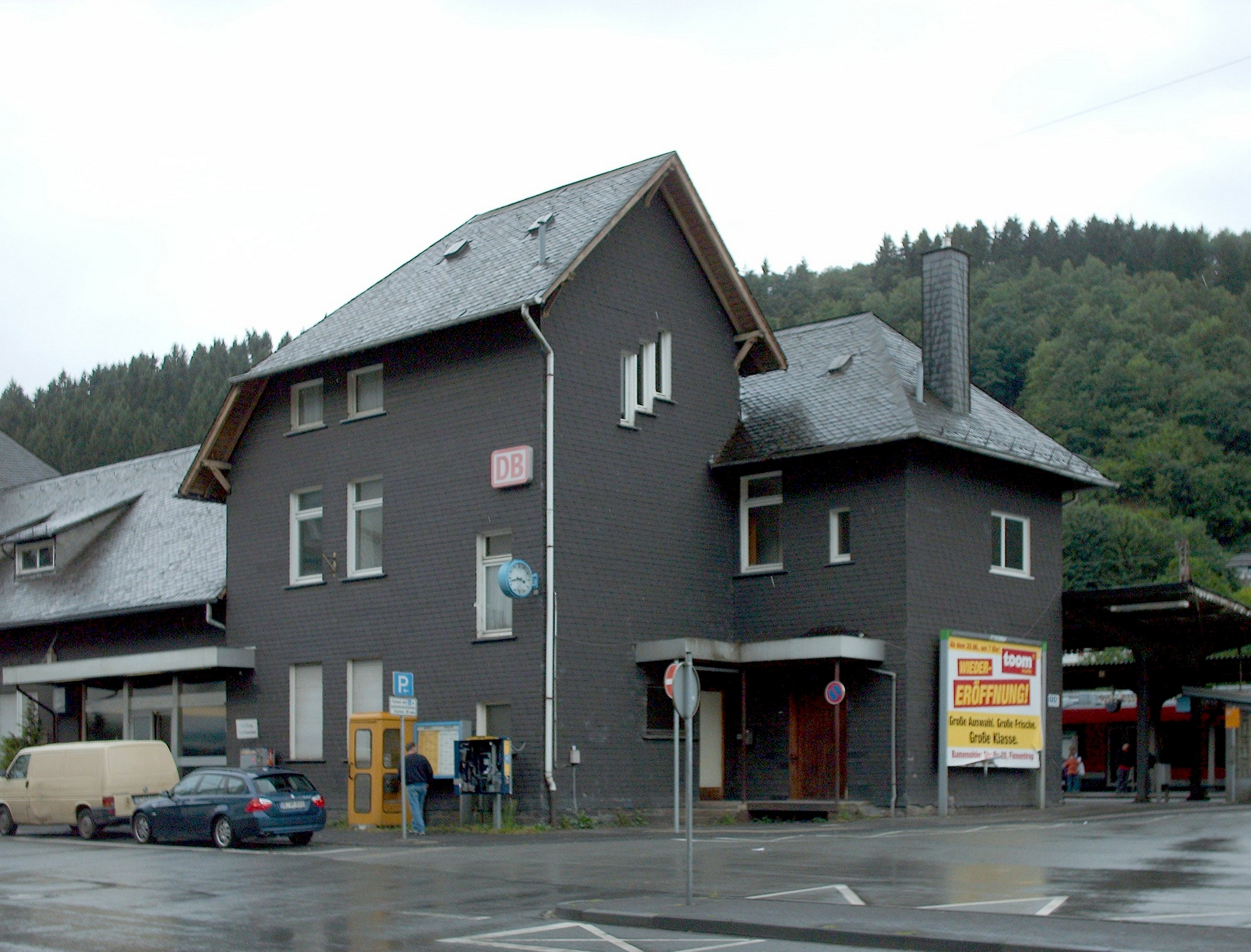
The station building demolished in 2007

A four road roundhouse was built in 1874. It was expanded after World War II. Around 1921, a 20-metre turntable was added. It was partially destroyed in 1944 and it was closed in 1982. On 6 February 2010, the roundhouse collapsed, when it was overloaded with snow. The carriage-maintenance facility, which had developed after the First World War was also closed. The walls of the roundhouse, however, have been retained. The depot also had a decontamination facility for cleaning and disinfecting livestock wagons.

The first mechanical signal box (code name: Fr) was commissioned at the marshalling yard in 1913 and three more were subsequently commissioned: Fs in 1924, Ff in 1928 and Fn in 1937. In 2002, the last three were replaced by an electronic interlocking built by Siemens. The raised signal box Ff, which is heritage-listed but threatened by demolition, is still preserved and the Fn and Fs signal boxes are heritage-listed by the municipality of Finnentrop.

== Operations ==
In the 2026 timetable, the following regional services stop at the station:

Line	Route	Frequency
IC 34	(Münster – Hamm –) Dortmund – Finnentrop – Siegen – Siegen – Dillenburg – Wetzlar – Bad Nauheim – Frankfurt / Friedberg (Hess)	5 train pairs
RE 34; Dortmund–Siegerland-Express	(Dortmund – Witten – Hagen –) Iserlohn-Letmathe – Finnentrop – Kreuztal – Siegen	60 or 120 min (60 mins for IC 34 and RE 34 together)
RB 91; Ruhr-Sieg-Bahn	Hagen – Letmathe – Finnentrop – Siegen	60 min
RB 92; Biggesee-Express	Finnentrop – Attendorn – Olpe	60 min

Several regional bus lines operate from the adjacent central bus station.
