= Greg Bluestein =

American journalist (born 1982)

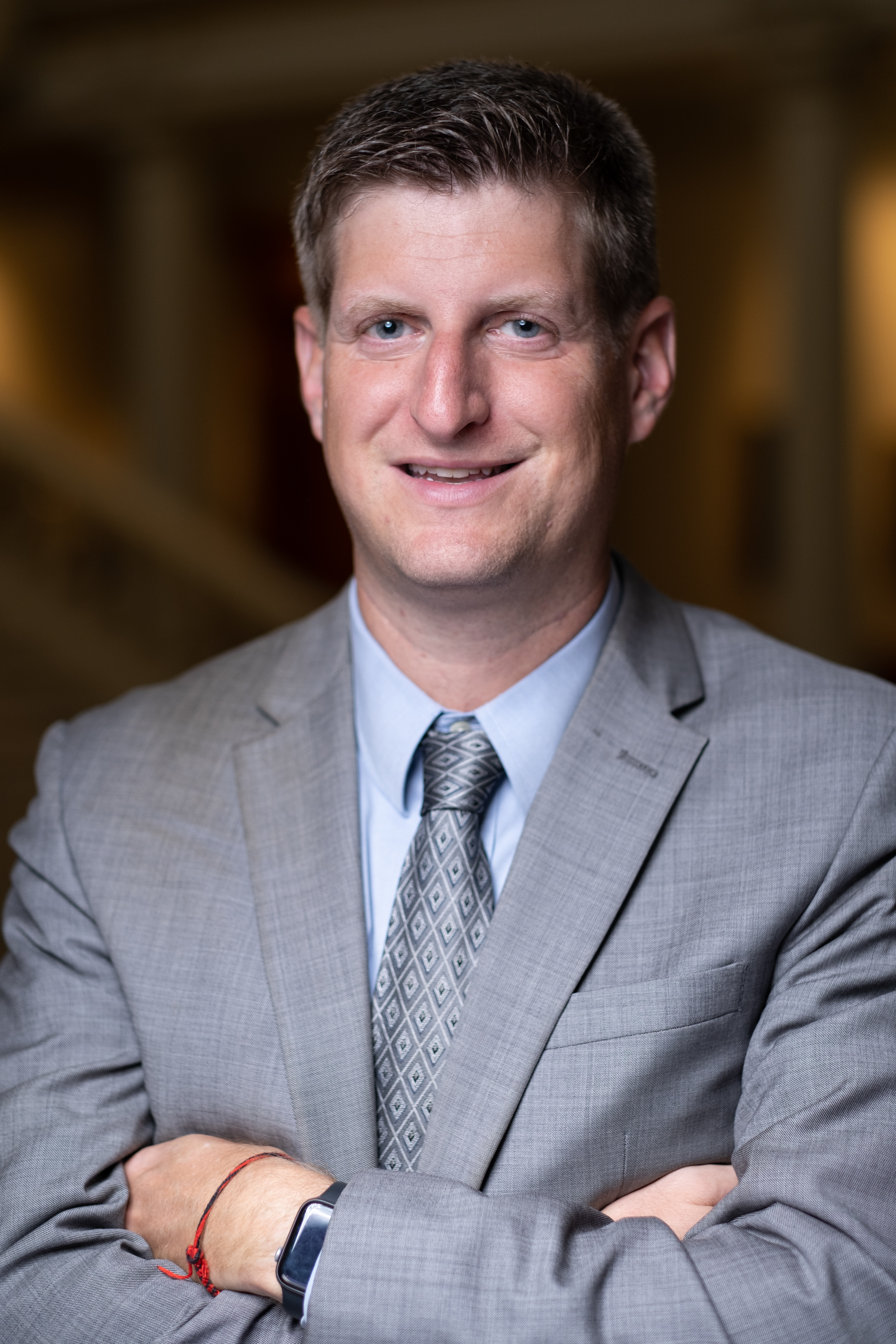
- Born: May 25, 1982 (age 44); Sandy Springs, Georgia, U.S.
- Education: University of Georgia
- Occupation: Journalist
- Employer: The Atlanta Journal-Constitution

Greg Bluestein (born May 25, 1982) is an American journalist, author and TV analyst who covers Georgia politics for The Atlanta Journal-Constitution. He has also written about former President Jimmy Carter and covered regional and national news as an Atlanta-based journalist for The Associated Press. He contributes to the Political Insider blog, is an MSNBC and NBC News contributor, and is host of the Politically Georgia podcast.

== Career ==
Bluestein was born in Atlanta, Georgia and graduated from North Springs High School and the University of Georgia (political science and journalism), where he was editor of The Red & Black campus newspaper.

Bluestein spent seven years with the Associated Press, between 2005 and 2012, where he covered breaking news, politics and legal affairs. He reported on the execution of Troy Davis, the post-presidency of Jimmy Carter and the Deepwater Horizon Oil Spill, the Upper Big Branch Mine explosion and the major tornado outbreak of 2011 in Alabama and Georgia.

He joined The Atlanta Journal-Constitution in 2012 to write about the political trends that shaped the region. He covered the 2014 race for governor between Nathan Deal and Jason Carter and the 2016 and 2020 presidential elections. He has examined how Joe Biden won Georgia in 2020 and documented the political ascent of Stacey Abrams, Brian Kemp, Jon Ossoff, Raphael Warnock and David Perdue.

During the 2016 presidential campaign, Bluestein contributed to a series of articles examining political change in the "Shifting South." He also has reported Georgia-related news from the Panama Canal Zone and Israel.

Bluestein was called Georgia's "chief political reporter" in an article in Atlanta Magazine and the state's "ace" politics journalist by Chris Cillizza.

He was named to UGA's 40 Under 40 Honorees in 2021. He delivered the convocation address at UGA's Grady College in 2021. Axios called him the "most dedicated" Georgia fan at the 2023 college football national championship when he attended the Los Angeles game shortly after being hospitalized in San Diego with a kidney stone.

On stage at a Donald Trump rally in 2022, he was called "Buttstein" by former State Representative Vernon Jones.

He is an MSNBC and NBC News political contributor and author of Flipped, published in 2022, on Georgia's transformation into a swing state. He has won numerous awards, including a 2021 Toner Prize for Local Political Reporting for a project on the campaign to undermine Georgia's 2020 election and won first-place for political reporting in the South in 2024 and 2025 by the Society for Professional Journalists.

== Books ==
- Flipped: How Georgia Turned Purple and Broke the Monopoly on Republican Power (Viking, 2022) ISBN 978-0-593-48915-4
