= North Springs High School =

Public high school in Sandy Springs, Georgia, United States

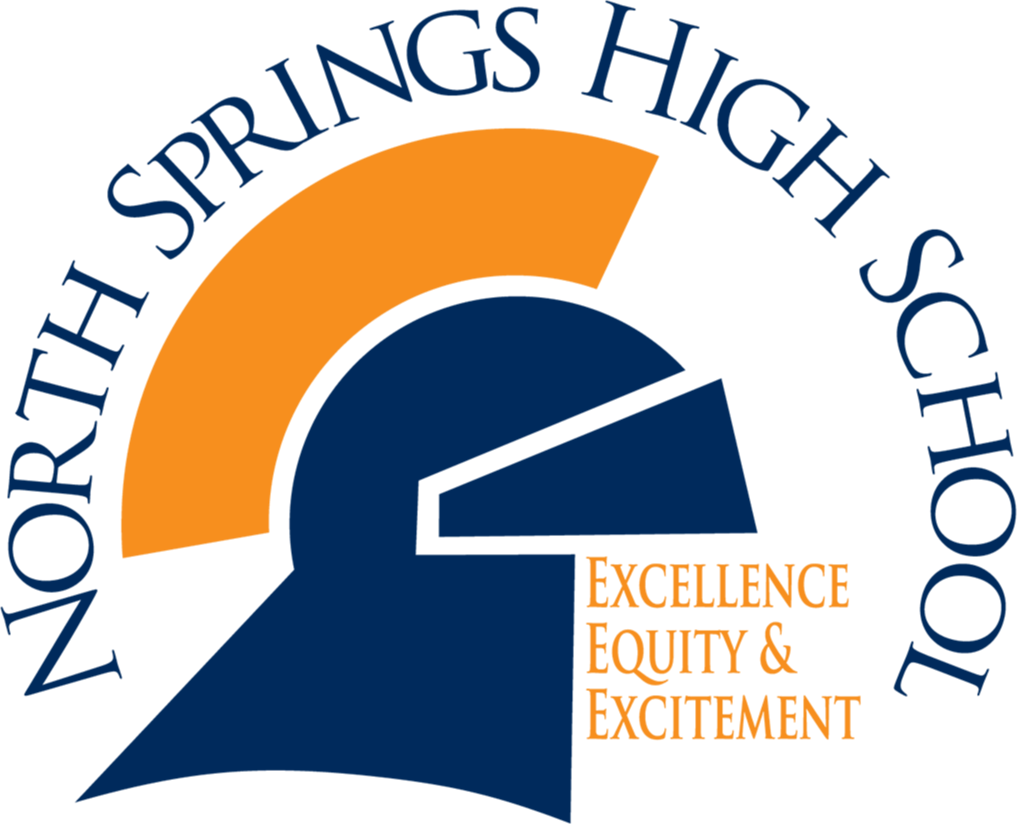

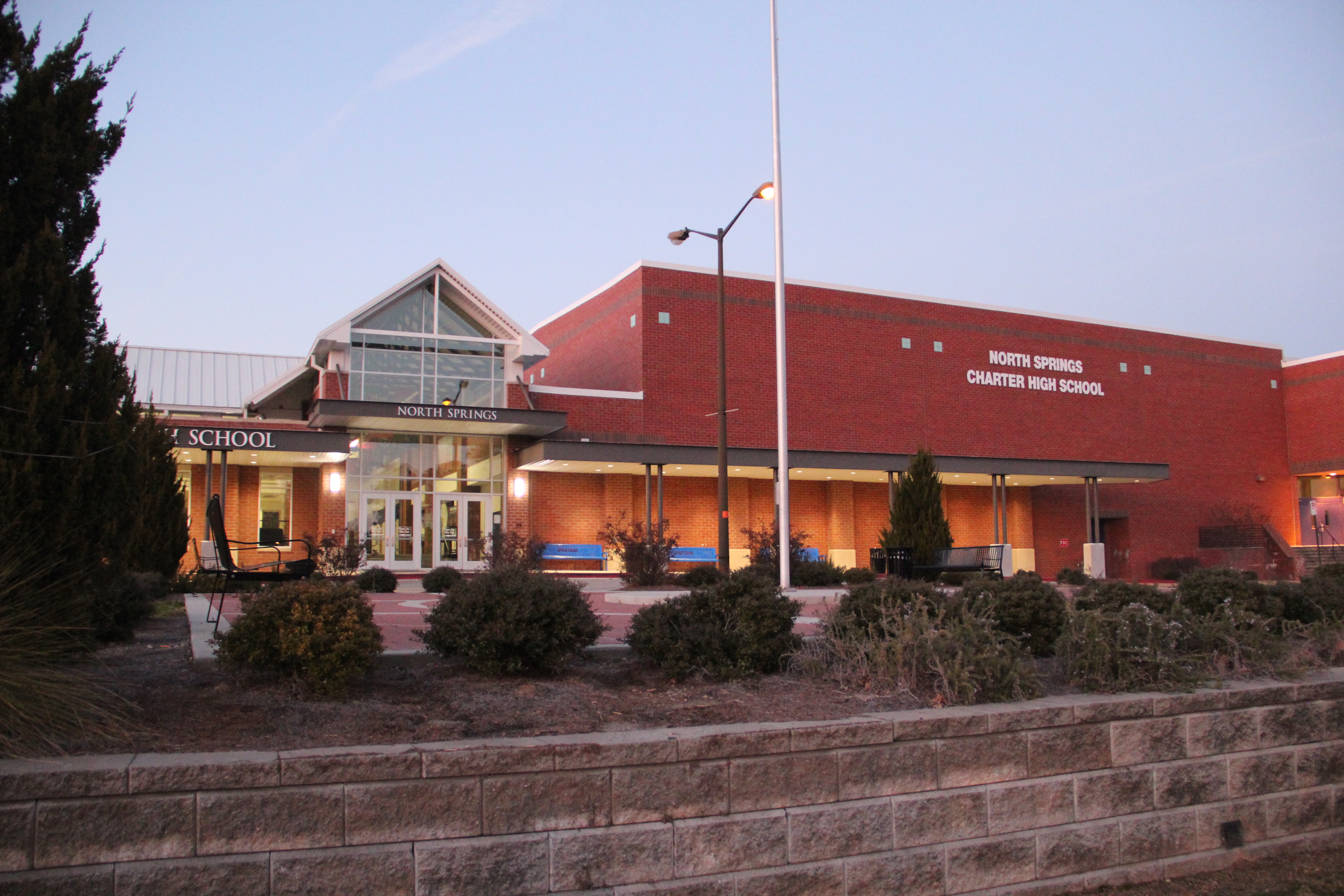
- North Springs High School in 2017

Location
- 7447 Roswell Road NE; Sandy Springs, Georgia 30328; United States; 33.95916°N 84.36527°W

Information
- Type: Public
- Established: 1963 (63 years ago)
- School district: Fulton County School System
- CEEB code: 111154
- NCES School ID: 130228001024
- Principal: Scott Hanson
- Faculty: 89.80 (FTE)
- Grades: 9–12
- Gender: Co-ed
- Enrollment: 1,195 (2024–2025)
  - Grade 9: 273
  - Grade 10: 313
  - Grade 11: 277
  - Grade 12: 332
- Student to teacher ratio: 13.31
- Campus type: Suburban
- Rival: Riverwood High School
- Newspaper: The Oracle
- Yearbook: The Phalanx
- Colors: Navy blue and orange
- Mascot: Spartan
- Website: northsprings.fultonschools.org

North Springs High School (formerly called North Springs Charter School of Arts and Sciences from 2007 to 2022) is an American public high school located in Sandy Springs, Georgia, United States. It is the only magnet school in the Fulton County School System that offers both arts and sciences.

== School information ==
North Springs High School is accredited by the Southern Association of Colleges and Schools (SACS) and the Georgia Department of Education. The majority of the 2005 graduating class (97%) attended a four or two year college, and 68% of the 2005 graduating class were HOPE scholars. North Springs was a Georgia School of Excellence, a Grammy Signature School (1997), and a U.S. News & World Report Outstanding High School (2000). It was also one of Newsweek magazine's Top 300 High Schools (2000). It gained charter status for the 2007–2008 school year.

The school has had many individual athletic achievements. In 1969, North Springs won a state title in football and soccer, two state championships in wrestling in 1976 and 1977, and two state championships in track and field in 2004 and 2005.

SAT averages
		Verbal	Math	Total
2005	Composite	542	543	1085
2004	Composite	550	558	1108
2003	Composite	532	546	1078
2005	M/S magnet	612	561	1173
2005	Arts magnet	554	535	1089
2005	Dual magnet	631	630	1261
2005	County mean	520	536	1056
2005	Georgia mean	497	496	993
2005	National mean	508	520	1028

ACT averages
		NSHS	System	State
2005	Composite	22	21	20
2004	Composite	23	20	21
2003	Composite	21	21	20

== Magnet programs ==
North Springs has a dual magnet program.

The mission of the North Springs High School's Science Magnet Program is to provide a higher academic level of scientific and mathematics education through problem-based learning centered in technology and research. The classes offered through this program are Biochemistry; Career Math/Science–Advanced Research Methods; Microbiology; Organic Chemistry; Introduction to Research Methods in Science, Science, Technology, and Society; Science Topics/Issues–Advanced Research Methods; Topics and Issues in Medical Ethics; Topics and Issues in Engineering; and Techniques in Engineering.

The Visual & Performing Arts Magnet Program is an interest-based program that enables students to receive pre-professional training that extends beyond the introductory level. The program provides exploration into such areas as music theory, history of the arts, composition, conducting, choreography, playwriting, directing, art production, and art criticism. Students are required to earn eight art magnet credits over the course of four years. The Arts Magnet is split into Theater Magnet, Choral Magnet, Dance Magnet, Film Magnet, Music Magnet, and Visual Arts Magnet.

== North Springs Cluster ==
North Springs School draws students from a cluster of middle and elementary schools, which work together to complete K-12 education. The cluster includes the following schools:

- Sandy Springs Middle School
- Ison Springs Elementary School
- Dunwoody Springs Elementary School
- Spalding Drive Elementary School
- Woodland Elementary School

== Notable alumni ==
=== Music ===
- Playboi Carti, rapper
- Usher, R&B singer
- Summer Walker, R&B singer

=== Sports ===
- Brandon Collins, professional wrestler
- Channing Crowder, National Football League (NFL) player
- Verron Haynes, NFL player
- Efrem Hill, Canadian Football League player
- Jordan Hill, National Basketball Association player
- Daniel Jackson, Major League Baseball (MLB) player
- Tom McMillan, MLB player
- Matt Robinson, NFL player
- Brook Steppe, basketball player

=== Film and TV ===
- Andrew Durand, actor, singer
- Abigail Hawk, actress
- Zack Fox, actor, comedian
- Faith Salie, American journalist, writer, actress, comedian, television, radio, and podcast host
- Raven-Symoné, actress
- John Schneider, actor

=== Politics ===
- Greg Bluestein, political journalist
- Saira Draper, politician
- Steven Schrage, academic
