= Elizabeth Verville =

American civil servant

Elizabeth Verville is an American civil servant in the Senior Executive Service (SES) who served as acting deputy assistant secretary of state (DAS) for international crime in the Bureau of International Narcotics and Law Enforcement Affairs. Verville led the U.S. delegations to the United Nations (UN) in developing multilateral treaties, such as the UN Convention against Transnational Organized Crime (UNTOC), which was passed in 2000 to combat transnational organized crime, and the UN Convention against Corruption (UNCAC). Prior to her role as acting DAS, she served on the National Security Council as director of global affairs for international crime, counternarcotics, and counterterrorism. She also previously served as deputy director of the first U.S. interagency office created to protect the nation's critical information infrastructure.

Verville received a bachelor's degree from Duke University in 1961. She received an LLB from Columbia Law School in 1964.

In the office of the Legal Adviser Verville started her work for the United States Department of State in 1969. She held the position of Deputy Legal Adviser from 1980 to 1990. As a senior member of the United States Delegation she participated in the Third United Nations Conference on the Law of the Sea. Verville also led the delegation of the United States in the negotiations that transacted the 1990 Maritime Boundary Agreement with the Soviet Union.
