= Josef Schrage =

German politician (1881–1953)

Josef Schrage (6 May 1881 – 27 November 1953) was a Westphalian metalworker, trade union official and politician, first of the Center Party and after World War II as one of the founders of the Christian Democratic Union.

== Background ==
Schrage was born on 6 May 1881 in Olpe and attended elementary school there. From 1895 to 1911 he worked as a metalworker. In 1916 he became full-time secretary of the Christlicher Metallarbeiterverband (Christian Metalworkers' Federation) in Siegen kreis and Olpe kreis. From 1919 to 1928 Schrage was head of the union administrative offices in Olpe, and from 1928 on, their Labor Office Director.

== Politics ==
In parallel, Schrage was politically active in the framework of the Centre Party. From 1919 to 1933 he was a city councilor in Olpe, he was on the Kreistag, and from 1921 to 1933 sat in the Province of Westphalia Provincial Parliament (Provinziallandtag). After the seizure of power by the Nazi Party, he lost his position as Labor Office Director and until the end of World War II distributed the newspaper Tremonia (Dortmund).

After the liberation of Germany, Schrage was full-time mayor of Olpe from May 1945 through March 1946. He was one of the founding members of the Christian Democratic Union in Olpe, and played a role in the party's founding in Ostwestfalen-Lippe. From 1946 to 1953 he was a member of the Landtag of North Rhine-Westphalia. In 1948–1949, Schrage was a member of the Parlamentarischer Rat which drafted and adopted the Basic Law for the Federal Republic of Germany (Grundgesetz).Between 1950 and 1953 he was Chairman of the Regional Assembly.

He was from 1947 to 1949 first deputy chairman and from 1949 to 1950 (as the successor to Konrad Adenauer) chairman of the CDU/CSU or Union fraktion. From then until his death he was honorary chairman.

In autumn 1953 he resigned from all his posts and died on 27 November 1953 from the effects of a stroke.

== See also ==
- List of German Christian Democratic Union politicians
