= Olpe, Germany =

Town in North Rhine-Westphalia, Germany

Olpe
- Town
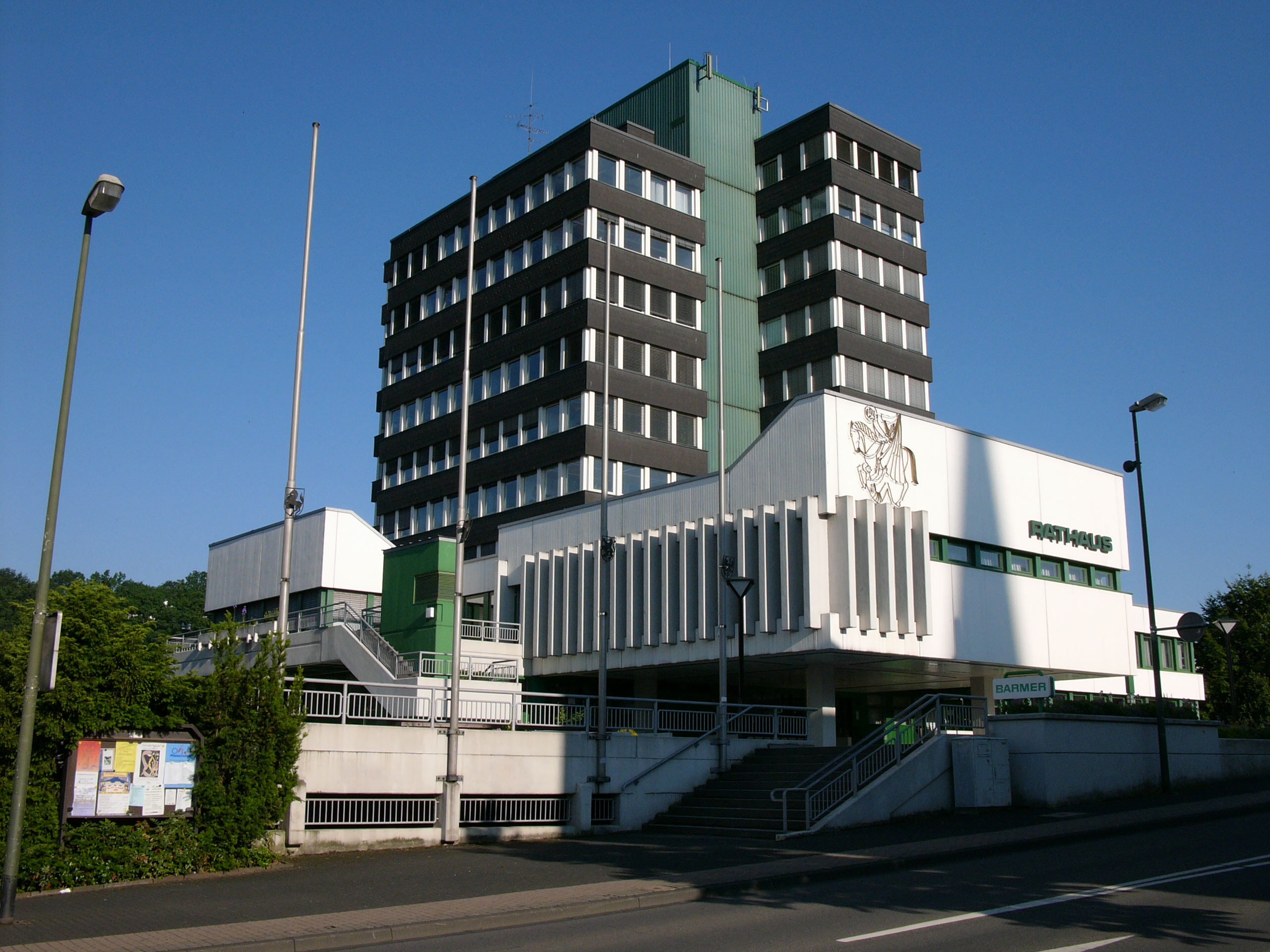
- Olpe Town Hall, one of the tallest buildings in the town

- Coat of arms

- Location of Olpe within Olpe district
- Interactive map of Olpe
- Location within Germany Location within North Rhine-Westphalia
- Coordinates: 51°01′N 07°50′E
- Country: Germany
- State: North Rhine-Westphalia
- Admin. region: Arnsberg
- District: Olpe
- Subdivisions: 22

Government
  - Mayor (2025–30): Tobias Schulte (CDU)

Area
  - Total: 85.88 km^{2} (33.16 sq mi)
- Elevation: 307 m (1,007 ft)

Population (2025-12-31)
  - Total: 24,518
  - Density: 285.5/km^{2} (739.4/sq mi)
- Time zone: UTC+01:00 (CET)
  - Summer (DST): UTC+02:00 (CEST)
- Postal codes: 57462
- Dialling codes: 02761, 02722, 02764
- Vehicle registration: OE
- Website: www.olpe.de

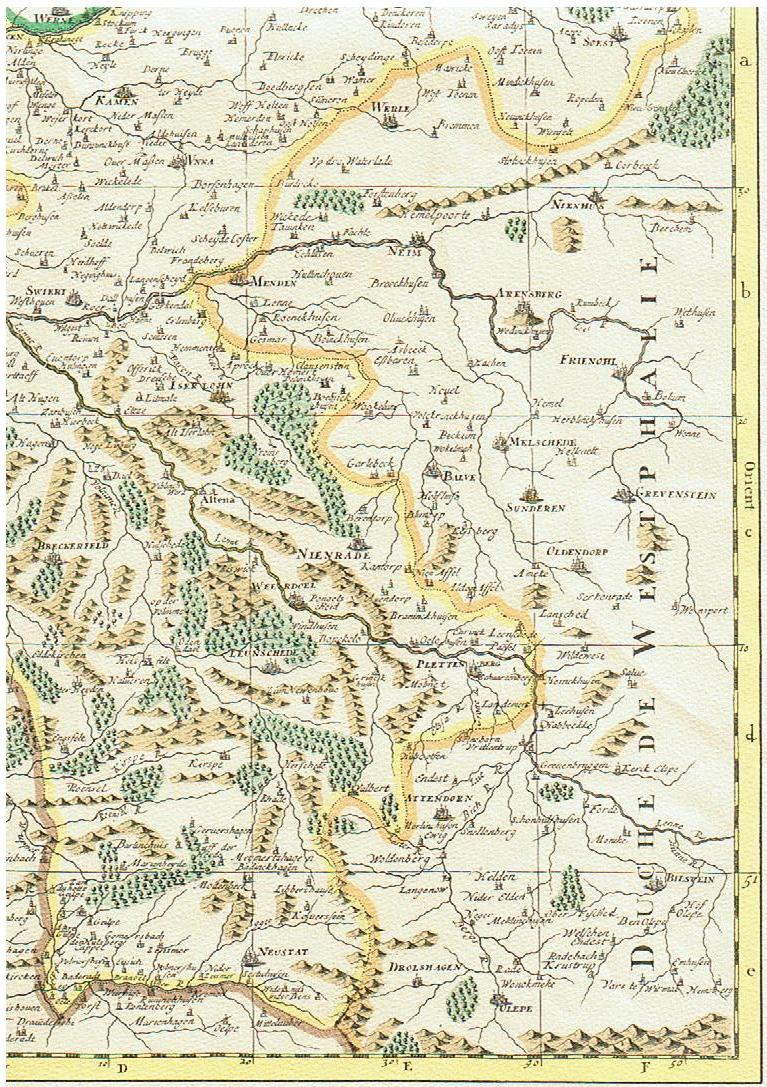
Detail of map of the County of Mark 1692 S. Sanson cartographer

Olpe (German pronunciation: [ˈɔlpə]) is a town situated in the foothills of the Ebbegebirge in North Rhine-Westphalia, roughly 60 km east of Cologne and 20 km northwest of Siegen. It is part of the Regierungsbezirk of Arnsberg and is the seat of the district of Olpe.

== Geography ==
=== Location ===
Olpe lies in the Sauerland on the southern edge of the Ebbegebirge Nature Park. In the town's north lies South Westphalia's biggest reservoir, the Biggesee.

=== Rivers and mountains ===
The highest mountains are:

- Engelsberg (589 m)
- Rother Stein (583 m)
- Feld-Berg (556 m)
- Hohe Rhonard (526 m)

The inner town is ringed by the following hills:

- Imberg
- Hatzenberg
- Gallenberg
- Lindenhardt
- Eichhardt
- Kimicker Berg
- Bratzkopf
- Kreuzberg

The municipal area also has a few rivers or brooks that all empty into the Biggesee:

- Bigge, fed by:
- Olpe, itself fed by:
- Günse
- Felmicke (underground),
- Kortemicke (underground),
- Ahe

Other rivers in the municipal area:

- Brachtpe
- Neger

The Veischedebach does not empty into the Biggesee, but rather into the Lenne near Grevenbrück.

=== Geology ===
Olpe is found in a broad stretch of hilly country. In the town's north, the slopes are steeper and the dales narrower (for instance near the centres of Rhode and Neger); in the south, the hills have soft knolls and the dales are more spacious. There are also no plateaux there.

The area around the Biggesee and the main town of Olpe, as the Bundesamt für Bauwesen und Raumordnung (Federal Office for Building and Regional Planning) sees them, are included in the Mittelbiggebergland (Middle Bigge Mountain Land), while the eastern and southern portions of the municipal area are designated Südsauerländer Rothaarvorhöhen (South Sauerland Rothaar Foothills).

The municipal area is an integral part of the Rheinisches Schiefergebirge (Rhenish Slate Mountains).

The underlying minerals around the middle and upper Bigge are made up to a considerable degree of schistose, partly chalky clays and coarse clay. Furthermore, there are sandstones with quartzitelike characteristics.

=== Municipal area’s extent ===
Olpe's municipal area has a total area of 86 km^{2}. Its greatest extent is in both the north–south and east–west directions, reaching 11 km. Olpe's lowest point is the Biggesee lying at 307.5 m above sea level, and its highest point is the Engelsberg near Neuenkleusheim at 589 m above sea level.

=== Neighbouring municipalities ===
- Town of Attendorn
- Town of Drolshagen
- Town of Lennestadt
- municipality of Kirchhundem
- Town of Kreuztal (in Siegen-Wittgenstein district)
- municipality of Wenden

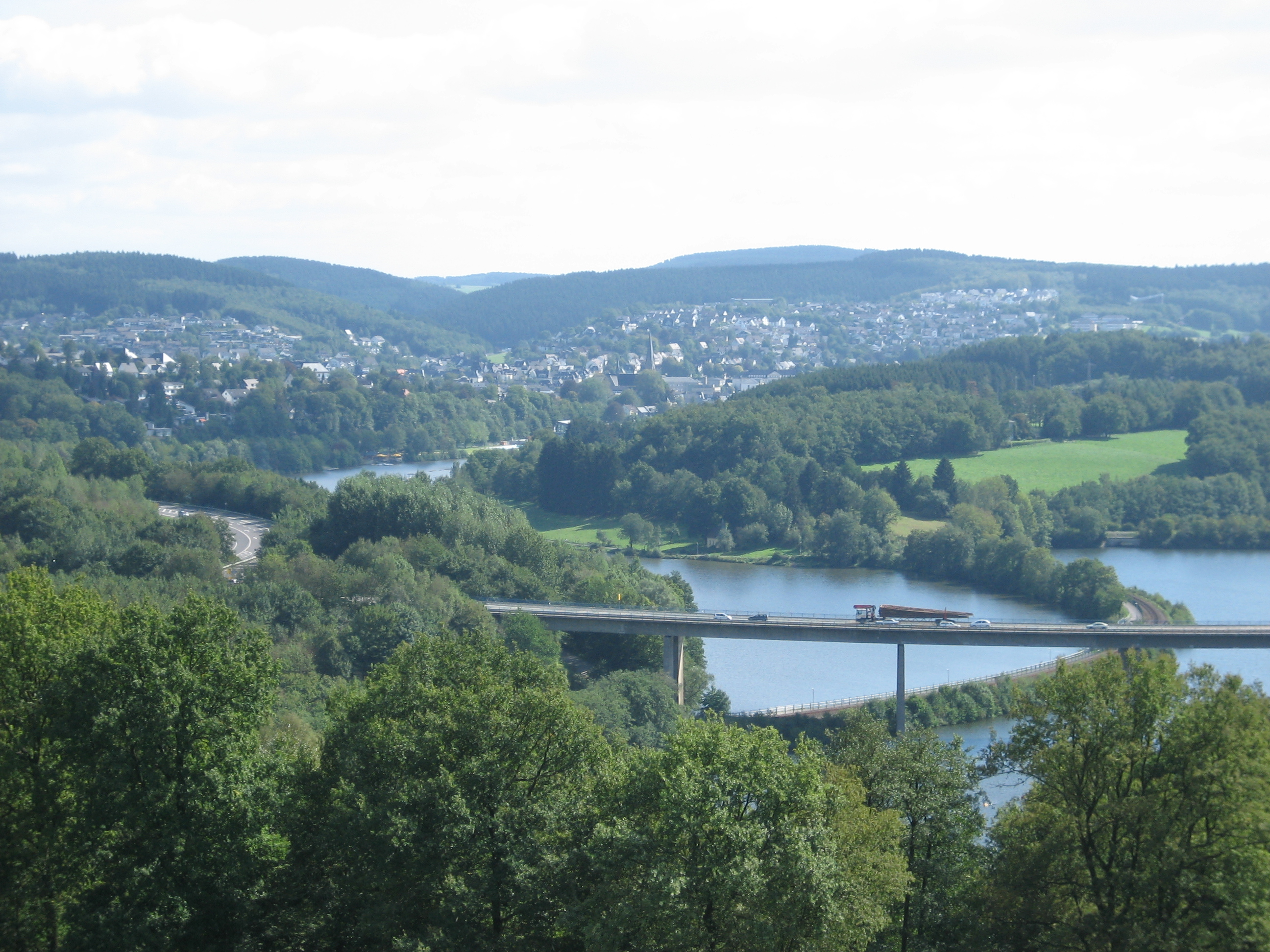
Town of Olpe from the northwest

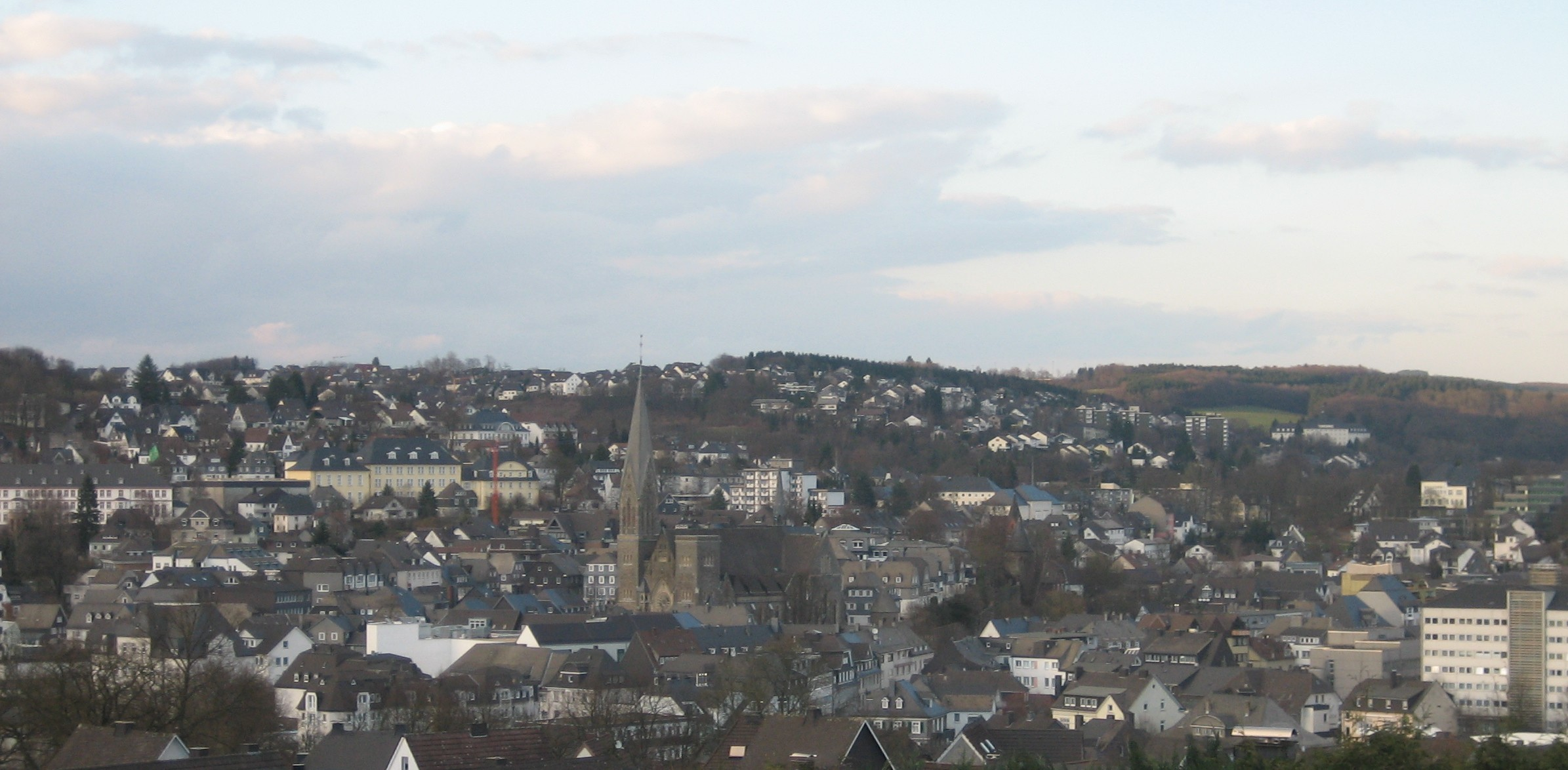
Olpe, inner town

=== Constituent municipalities ===
The municipal area is divided into the following centres:

Altenkleusheim, Apollmicke, Bruch, Dahl, Eichhagen, Fahlenscheid, Friedrichsthal, Griesemert, Grube Rhonard, Günsen, Hardt, Hanemicke, Hitzendumicke, Hof Siele, Hohl, Howald, Hüppcherhammer, Kessenhammer, Lütringhausen, Möllendick, Neger (divided into Unter-, Mittel- and Oberneger), Neuenkleusheim, Neuenwald, Oberveischede, Rehringhausen, Rhode, Rhonard, Ronnewinkel, Rosenthal, Rüblinghausen, Saßmicke, Siedenstein, Sondern, Stachelau, Stade, Tecklinghausen Thieringhausen and Waukemicke.

=== Climate ===
Owing to the location of the hills and the west wind, it rains often in Olpe. The clouds gather water vapour over the Atlantic Ocean, and when they run into the slopes in the hilly country around Olpe, they rise and the water vapour condenses into bigger droplets because of the cooler temperatures. These then fall as rain.

The coldest month is January, and the warmest July. The high humidity in the winter months often leads to fog.

== History ==
Olpe supposedly got its name from an older name for the land at the forks of the Olpe and Bigge ("Ol-apa" = brook in moist meadowland)

The first archaeological finds in the Olpe area date to about AD 900: potsherds and slag (from iron mining and working) in the abandoned centre of Kimickerberg, coins in Dahl (from after 1005).

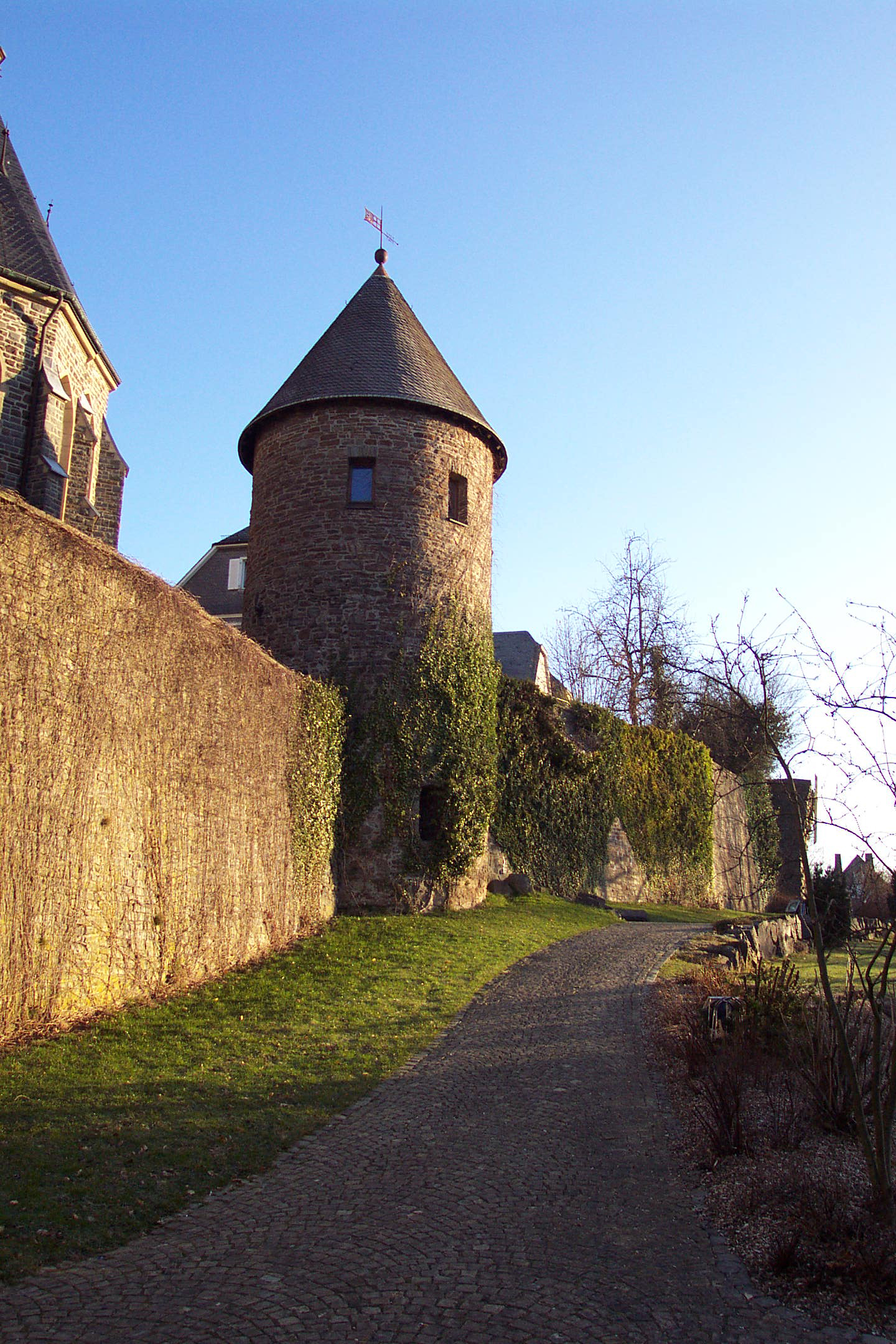
The only remaining part of Olpe's old town wall.

Olpe had its first documentary mention in 1220. In 1311 it was granted town rights on the Soest model by the archbishop-elector of Cologne, Count Heinrich II of Virneburg. In 1500, the Kreuzkapelle (Cross Chapel) was first mentioned. The first evidence of a shooting society followed in 1525.

History also records evidence of witch trials being held in the Olpe judicial area between 1587 and 1697.

In 1615, Olpe had its first schoolteacher, and in 1634 it had a great fire. The first vow to Saint Agatha of Catania for protection against conflagrations, however, was not recorded until 1665. Eight years later came the first vow to Saint Roch of Montpellier against the Plague and other pestilences. In 1696, the last witch was sentenced.

In 1711, the post first came to Olpe. In 1795, the Great Fire of Olpe destroyed 83% of the town. When the town was built once again, the old mediaeval appearance was cast aside in favour of a master plan that saw three broad, parallel streets built, connected by sidestreets running at right angles to them.

In 1819 Olpe became a district seat. At that time, it was the seat of the Bilsteiner Kreis; today it fills that place in the district of Olpe.

In 1828, the shooting club was refounded. Its name is St.-Sebastianus-Schützenverein. The Evangelical municipality was founded between 1842 and 1844. In 1863, the Arme Franziskanerinnen von der ewigen Anbetung (Poor Franciscans of the Everlasting Worship), a Catholic women's order whose main work is in taking care of children and nursing, was founded. It is nowadays known as the Franziskanerinnen von der ewigen Anbetung zu Olpe (Franciscans of the Everlasting Worship at Olpe).

In 1864, there was a telegraph station in Olpe. In 1875, the railway reached Olpe, running at first to Attendorn and Finnentrop. Then came an Olpe-Rothemühle line in 1880, and in 1903, another to Bergneustadt. In 1888, the town had its first electric light.

In 1908, the St.-Martinus-Kirche (church) burnt down almost utterly owing to, it is believed, arson. It was built anew in 1909, but this time in the Gothic Revival style.

On 28 March 1945, in the Second World War’s dying days, Olpe was heavily bombed. In 1965, the Bigge Reservoir (Biggetalsperre) was created through damming.

The Bundesautobahn 45 and the Bundesautobahn 4 were opened in 1971 and 1976 respectively.

=== Religion ===
Olpe’s population is overwhelmingly Catholic. The town’s patron is Saint Martin of Tours.

Religion	Adherents	%
Catholic:	17,834	67.99
Evangelical:	3,732	14.26
Other/None:	4,644	17.75

==== Catholic ====
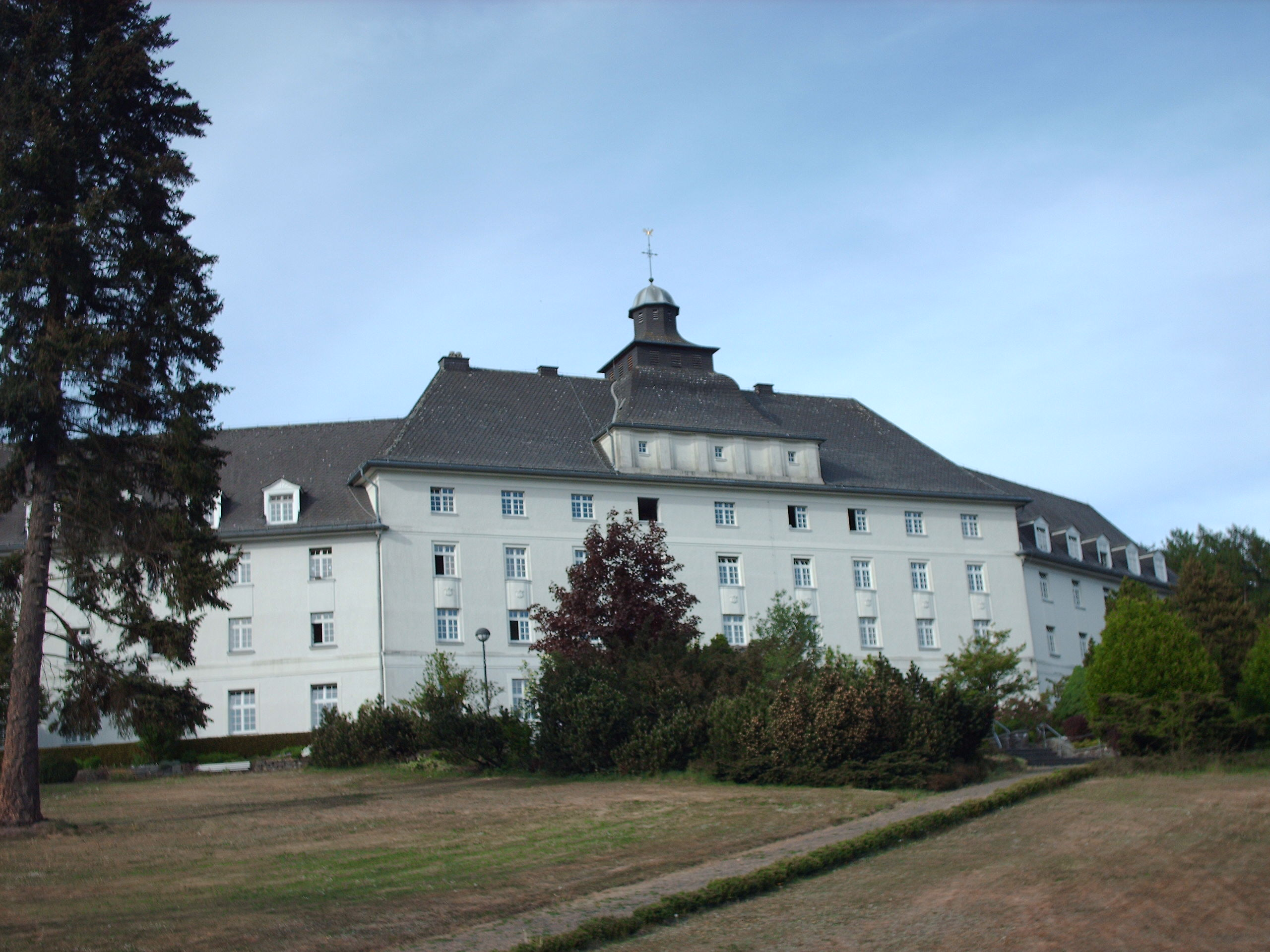
Pallotti-Haus

Olpe belongs to the Archbishopric of Paderborn. At the middle level, Olpe is ecclesiastically administered by the Deanery of the South Sauerland, which was formed out of the former deaneries of Attendorn, Elspe and Olpe on 1 July 2006, and is coëxtensive with the district of Olpe.

At the lowest level, there are two parish clusters (Pastoralverbünde) in Olpe:

- Olpebach-Täler, consisting of the Pfarrei St. Mariae Himmelfahrt Olpe (Parish of St. Mary’s Assumption, Olpe) with the chapel parishes of Günsen, Lütringhausen, Rhonard, Stachelau, Thieringhausen along with the Kirchspiel Kleusheim (parish) with the centres of Altenkleusheim, Neuenkleusheim and Rehringhausen. * Pastoralverbund Olpe-Biggesee, consisting of the Pfarrei St. Martinus Olpe (Parish of St. Martin, Olpe) with the branch parishes of Dahl-Friedrichsthal and Saßmicke, the parish vicary of Heilig Geist (“Holy Ghost”, west area of Olpe and Rüblinghausen) and the parish region of Hatzenberg along with the Pfarrei St. Cyriakus (parish) in Rhode with the branch parish of Sondern and the parish vicaries of Oberveischede and Neger.

Once a year, in early July, at the Festival of the Assumption, hundreds take part in the town pilgrimage from Olpe to Werl.

Moreover, there are two monastic establishments:

- a convent run by the Franciscan Sisters of Perpetual Adoration at Olpe;
- the Pallottine monastery at the Pallotti-Haus.

The Pallottines’ provincial head has stated that his congregation will, at least in the medium term, stay in Olpe. For economic reasons, however, the order has sold the building to an investor who wants to set up 40 dwellings for the aged and 100 fully equipped nursing care places. The Brethren and the Father are staying in rented accommodations in town while the conversion is being done. They are to return to the Pallotti-haus afterwards as renters. Spiritual work is to continue unchanged.

==== Protestant ====
There has been a Protestant parish since 1844. To it belongs Olpe's oldest church, which was built of red brick in 1898.

==== Other religious municipalities ====
An Evangelical Free Church municipality, the Jehovah's Witnesses, the New Apostolic Church, an Islamic municipality and the Greek Orthodox Church are all represented in town.

=== Amalgamations ===
As a result of municipal restructuring on 1 July 1969, the “old town” (the older town of Olpe and the outlying former Amt) has now been joined by the formerly autonomous municipalities of Kleusheim, Olpe-Land and Rhode as well as by parts of the old municipalities of Helden (Oberveischede, Tecklinghausen, Neuenwald), Rahrbach (Fahlenscheid) and Kirchveischede (Apollmicke) to form a new, expanded municipal area swelling from a former 12.78 km^{2} to 85.65 km^{2} in area, and from 14,184 to 21,705 in population

=== Population development ===
Historical population

Year	Pop.	±% p.a.
1781	1,354	—
1890	3,088	+0.76%
1910	5,334	+2.77%
1939	7,561	+1.21%
1950	10,280	+2.83%
1965	20,180	+4.60%
1970	21,164	+0.96%
1975	21,874	+0.66%
1980	22,344	+0.43%

Year	Pop.	±% p.a.
1985	22,209	−0.12%
1990	23,785	+1.38%
1995	24,605	+0.68%
2000	25,162	+0.45%
2005	25,664	+0.40%
2010	25,409	−0.20%
2015	24,757	−0.52%
2020	24,593	−0.13%
2025	24,518	−0.06%

Source: Landesdatabank Nordrhein-Westfalen (1965-2025)

== Politics ==
=== Town council ===
2020 municipal election results
Party/Voter municipality	Votes	Seats
CDU	52.2%	20
UCW e. V.	13.4%	5
SPD	9.6%	4
Greens	14.8%	6
FDP	5.8%	2
OLO (open list)	3.7%	1

=== Youth parliament ===
The Jugendparlament has existed since late 2005. It represents youth's interests with the goal of developing proposals for improving the situation for children in Olpe and of suggesting measures to be taken, so that the town's council and administration can be more strongly responsive to children's and youths’ wishes.

The youth parliament currently consists of 25 members, each elected for a two-year mandate by secondary schools. For every 150 students, one representative is elected, although each school gets at least two representatives. All students, even those from neighbouring municipalities, in Years 5 to 10 may vote at the schools in Olpe. Only students who live in Olpe, however, may stand as candidates.

The youth parliament sits, usually publicly, at least four times each year. If it is so wished, working groups can be formed at sittings for various projects in which even unelected member children and youths may work.

=== Mayors and Directors ===
From 1946 until 1997, the chief administrative office in Olpe was known as the Stadtdirektor (“Town Director”). The Bürgermeister (“Mayors”) were honorary and had mostly ceremonial duties.

Mayors (since 1800)	Time in office	Remarks
Johannes Möllendik	1802, 1804, 1806	First Mayor
Dr Johann Edmund Funcke	1802	Second Mayor
Dr Johann Edmund Funcke	1803	First Mayor
Franz Josef Zeppenfeld	1804, 1806, 1811	Second Mayor
Jodocus Edmund Weber	1811–1823	Stadtschultheiß
Schute	1824	
Gottfried Anton Gerlach	1825	
Johann Adam Halbfas	1825–1850	Amtmann
	1851–1861	Mayor
Ernst Hermann Halbfas	1861–1879	
Louis Wilhelm Liese	1880–1891	
Ewald Röper	1891–1896	
F. Josef Caspar Hundt	1896	acting (deputy)
Franz Karl Dütz-Josun	1897–1901	
Heinrich Sommerhoff	1901–1933	
Theodor Schulte	1933–1943	
Josef Wurm	1943–1945	
Dr Heinrich Otto Spies	April 1945	
Josef Schrage (CDU)	1945–1946	full-time
Dr Adolf Bieker	1946	
Franz Adam	1946–1947	
Franz Stork (CDU)	1948–1952	
Ignatz Müller (CDU)	1952–1964	
Alfred Enders (CDU)	1964–1979	
Wilma Ohly (CDU)	1979–1997	
Horst Müller (CDU)	1997-2015	full-time
Peter Weber (CDU)	2015-2025	full-time
Tobias Schulte (CDU)	since 2025	full-time

Stadt- and Amtsdirektoren (1946–1996)	Time in office
Josef Klein	1946–1949
Paul Habbel	1949–1968
Dr Ernst Elbers	1968–1988
Karl-Josef Leyendecker	1989–1996

=== Coat of arms ===
Olpe's town arms

The arms show an episode from Saint Martin's life, when he gave a beggar half his coat. As early as 1360, this scene adorned the town's oldest seal. In 1911, as a sign of the long membership in the Archbishop-Electorate of Cologne (1180-1802), the cross of the Archbishop-Electors of Cologne was added to the upper right corner.

=== Town partnerships ===
Since 28 July 2001 there has been a partnership arrangement with the French town of Gif-sur-Yvette. The town Gymnasium in Olpe has for years been conducting student exchanges with a collège in Gif-sur-Yvette.

== Culture and sightseeing ==
Culture plays an important role in the district seat. The town cultural office's regular events, as well as those staged by clubs from various fields form the portrait of cultural work in Olpe. Concerts of all kinds, plays, musicals, cabaret acts, exhibitions and other events appear regularly in the programmes.

The following venues are on hand:

- Stadthalle Olpe (“town hall”, but an event hall rather than the administration centre)
- Marktplatz (marketplace)
- Lorenz-Jaeger-Haus
- Altes Lyzeum
- Kreishaus Olpe (district administration centre)
- Kreuzkapelle (chapel)

=== Museums ===
Since 1997, the Förderverein Stadtmuseum Olpe (“Olpe Town Museum Development Association”) has been trying to establish a local museum. Owing to the town's difficult financial situation, however, it has not yet been possible to realize this. Nevertheless, the Association's goal is still to open such a museum in time for Olpe's 700-year jubilee in 2011.

=== Buildings ===
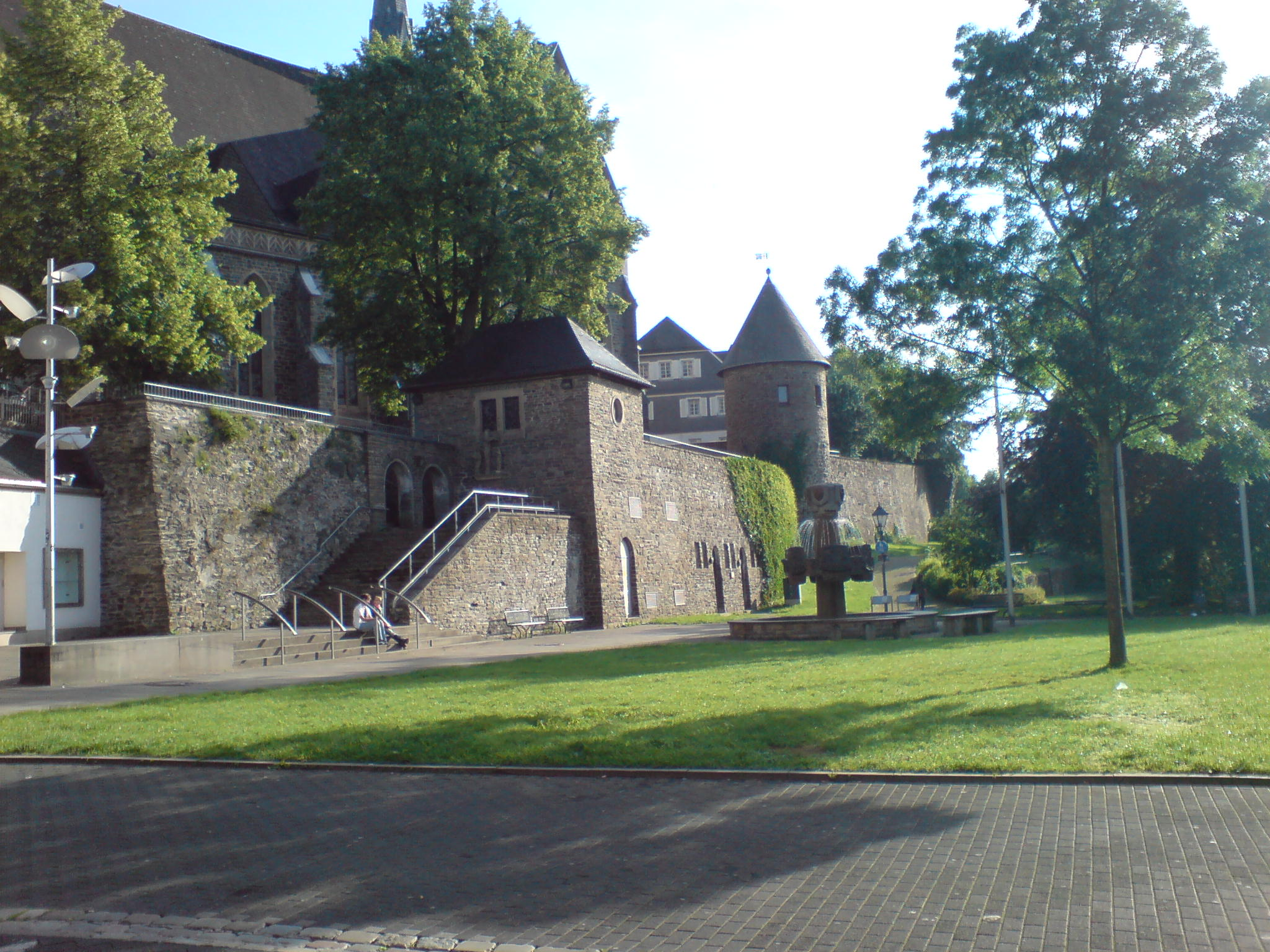
Town wall in Olpe (Weierhohl)

Seventy-three buildings are listed on the town's list of monumental buildings, among them churches, rectories and chapels, but also houses and monuments. Not all the buildings listed here are protected monuments, but each has an important function for Olpe:

- Historic town wall with Engelsturm and Hexenturm (towers)
  Once Olpe was raised to town in 1311, the fortified town wall appeared no later than 1373. It consisted of three great and two lesser town gates and a few round towers. Today all that is left of the old town wall is some remnants in the Weierhohl with the Engelsturm ("Angels' Tower") and Hexenturm ("Witches' Tower"). The latter, built in the 14th century, is the town's oldest preserved profane building. Its name might refer to those accused or found guilty of being witches, for which the tower might have been used as a prison. However, there is no proof of this. The Olpe Heimatforscher ("homeland researcher", roughly "local historian") Manfred Schöne assumed that the name came from Hessenturm ("Hesse Tower").
  Furthermore, under the town wall has lain the memorial site created by Ewald Mataré in 1963. It recalls the war's victims and serves as a memorial for the living, and since 1996 there has also been a "Hounds' Memorial" commemorating a particular breed that arose in Olpe.
- Waterwheel
  The waterwheel stands at the former site of the Oberste Stadtmühle ("Uppermost Town Mill") in the Weierhohl. It is complemented by the old mill's remains. The Unterste Stadtmühle ("Lowermost Town Mill") persisted into the 1960s on Mühlenstraße, where the new cinema now stands. The mills were supplied from the Olpe and Bigge through two millraces.
- Martinus-Kirche with Agatha statue
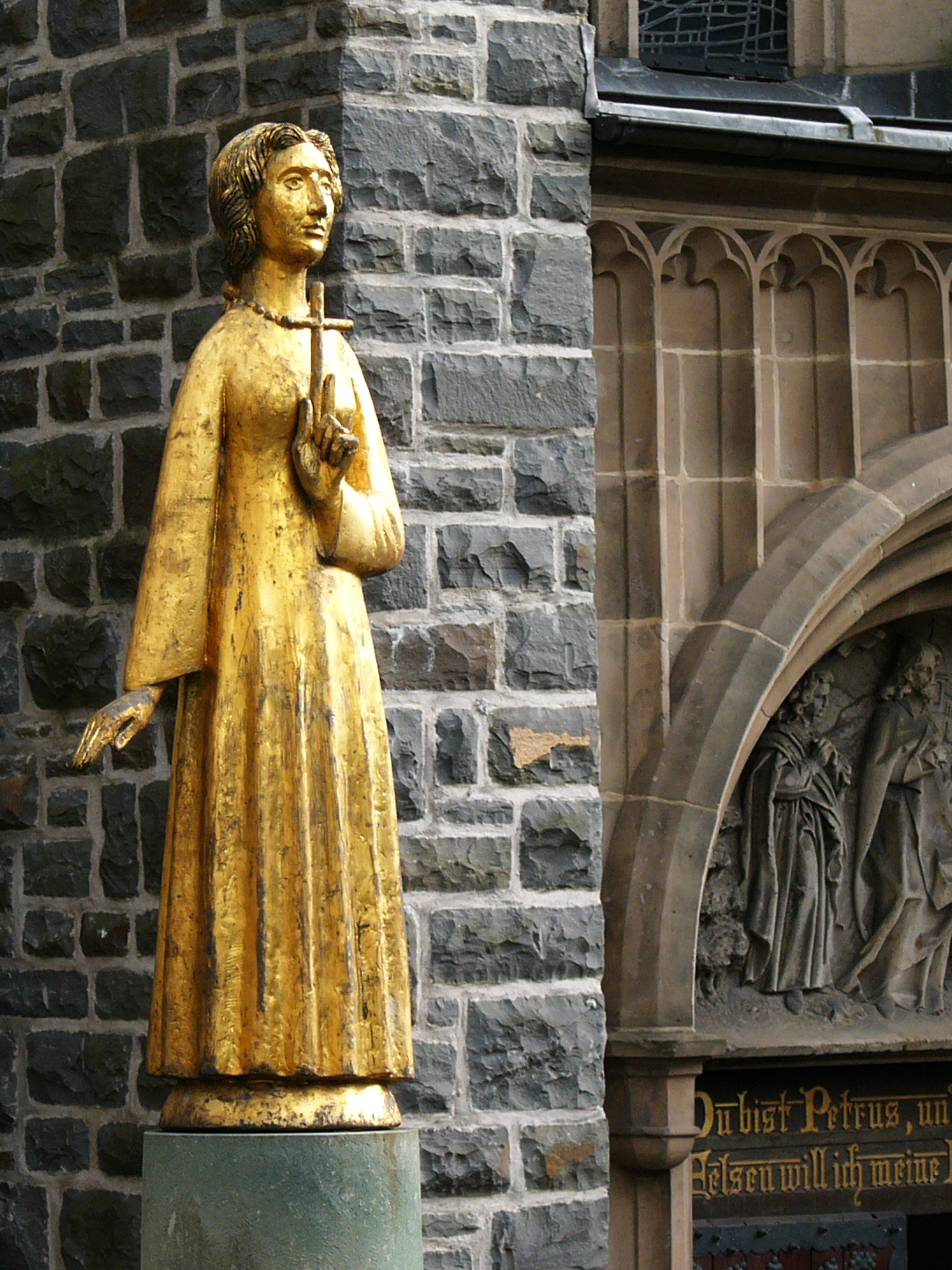
  Saint Agatha
  After the arson fire in 1907, Saint Martin's Church was built in the Gothic Revival style as a three-naved hall church with transept and twin-tower façade. One of the two towers was destroyed in the bombing on 28 March 1945 and was never repaired, being left in its damaged state today as a memorial for peace. The current mayor, however, is trying to raise an endowment whose goal would be to rebuild the tower. Before the north exit, a statue of Saint Agatha has stood since 1979.
- Evangelical church
  This was built in 1897 and 1898 and is thereby the town's oldest church. It was built of red brick.
- Marketplace with Pannenklöpper (local word for "tinsmiths") Memorial
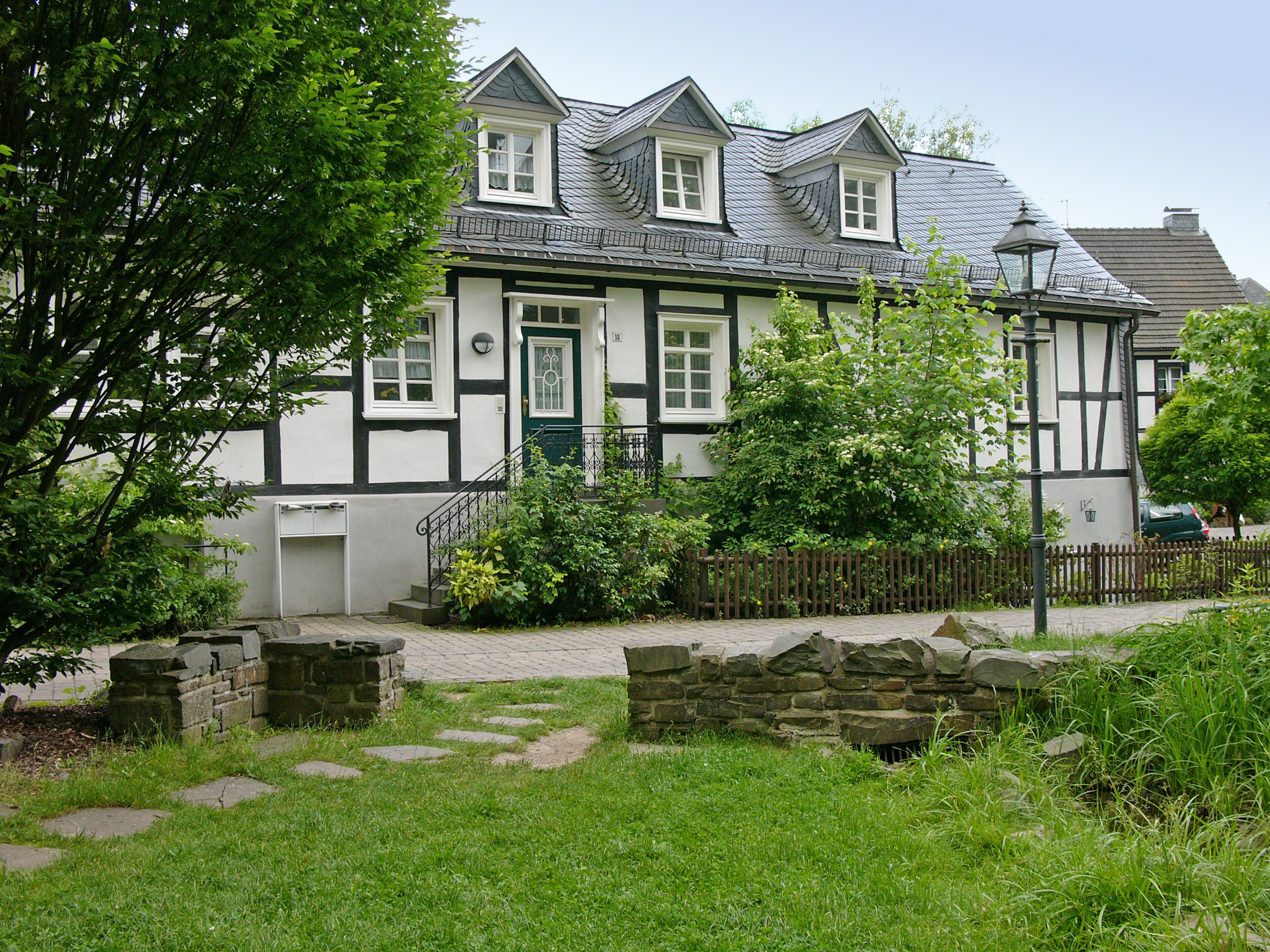
  The last of a number of houses where tanners once lived and worked.
  After the Great Fire in 1795, the mediaeval layout was abandoned and a new one built from the ground up. This was conceived by Johann Adam Stahl. The marketplace's current shape was drawn from this plan. Many houses that were built at this time stand on cellars of the older houses that burnt down. In places, they jut into the street. In the 1990s, the marketplace was overhauled, and, except on Sundays when High Mass is celebrated at Saint Martin's Church, it is a carfree area. The Panneklöpper-Denkmal was erected in 1982 and recalls the former importance of this profession in the town of Olpe.
- Chapels (Kreuzkapelle, Rochuskapelle and Valentinskapelle)
- Kurkölner Platz ("Electoral-Cologne Square") with the Geschichtsbrunnen ("History Fountain/Well")

=== Natural monuments ===
- Biggesee
- Kölsches Heck

Kölsches Heck (roughly "Cologne Hedge") refers to what is now the administrative boundary between the districts of Olpe and Siegen-Wittgenstein. It once served as a border defence, consisting of ditches and walls with hedges cut to a man’s height and interlaced with each other. Beyond a space of 15 to 100 m there often followed another ditch or wall structure. Today, traces of this old fortification may be found above Altenkleusheim.

=== Sport ===
Locally, Olpe has a number of places where people can involve themselves in athletic activities. For example, there are eleven gymnasia, nine tennis courts, and ten football/soccer fields.

- Olpe's largest sports site is the Kreuzbergstadion. It holds both natural and artificial turf, and is equipped with a 150–lux projection system. The Kreuzbergstadion is the center of the German Football Association's under-12 through under-21 development programs. There is also an eight-lane track, a high jump pit, a long jump pit, and triple jump pit for the athletes.
- Aquatics
  In Olpe's newly renovated pool, there are several different pools and hot tubs. The same building also houses a sauna and an outdoor pool.

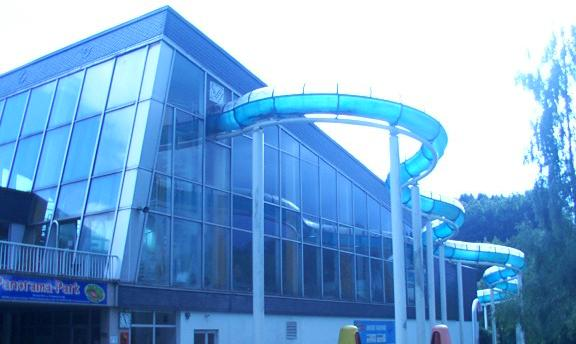
The indoor pool before renovations

- Football
  Olpe is home to eleven football clubs who play on ten fields.
- Diving
  The Biggesee offers a great place for diving. Not only do locals come: there have also been many groups that come from abroad to have the opportunity to dive in the Biggesee.
- The Athletic Club
  With over 3,000 members, the Turnverein Olpe or TVO is the largest athletic club in the municipality of Olpe. It has an eclectic lot of activities such as gymnastics, badminton, basketball, handball, track and field, taekwondo, and volleyball.

=== Regular events ===
Many of the customs observed in town and in the outlying countryside are many hundreds of years old. They often have roots in church tradition.

- Shooting festivals are held in many of the town's centres. The biggest one in the municipal area is the Olpe Shooting Festival held by the St.-Sebastianus-Schützenverein, always on the weekend of the third Sunday in July. It is held on the Ümmerich, the shooting range on the Imberg. The club boasts almost 5,000 members.
- Agatha-Tag (Saint Agatha's Day), 5 February, and a procession the following Sunday.
- Poschefeuer, an Easter fire on the Gallenberg, the Bratzkopf and in almost every village in the town.
- Rochus-Gelübde ("Vow to Saint Roch") with procession following.
- Muggelkirmes (third Sunday in September), a great festival for a good cause offering many things for young and old without the usual carney trade, but instead with much amateur participation and a family atmosphere.
- St. Martin's Day with procession
- Organ piece Der alte Zimmermann ("The Old Carpenter") at Christmas
- Between the Days-Festival (known as such even in German) – For more than 30 years this musical event, known far beyond the town, has beckoned many concertgoers every 29 December to Olpe with its broad array of pop and rock bands.
- Ölper Tied (11 o'clock in the morning – traditional "Ölper" time for a drink)

=== Culinary specialities ===
- Shooting festival specialities
  The Olper Beff is a kind of beef patty into which potato is also mixed. It is served with a brown gravy – oxtail soup – and served warm together with a bread roll. Its quality is officially tested the Friday before the shooting festival at the Beff-Probe.
- Only at the Olpe Shooting Festival do a few of the town's butcher shops offer Spürne for sale, a cold meat made of pickled cow's udder. There is also a children's drink at the shooting festival called Quatsch (literally "balderdash" or "hokum", although it is actually raspberry juice).
- Butterbrezel
  A genuine Olpe speciality is the Butterbrezel (butter pretzel) which was originally made by the Gastreich Bakery, then later by the Sommerhoff Bakery and nowadays by the Konditorei Lüning.
- Kemper's Korn
  At the Kemper distillery, owned by Arens, with water from its own well, a grain schnapps is produced, along with various liqueurs.
- Veischeder Landbier
  In the outlying centre of Oberveischede for a few years now, the Müller Brewery has been brewing dark and light Pils in a house brewery, which is also sold outside the house. A neighbouring bakery also uses the beer to bake Veischeder Landbierbrot (beer bread).

== Economy and infrastructure ==
=== Historical ===
The wealth of forest, ore and water was the foundation on which the iron foundries, hammerworks, tinsmithies and tanneries were built. Moreover, the town's location between the Siegerland on one side and the Brandenburg-ruled Sauerland on the other favoured economic development. No later than the 18th century, Olpe and its outlying areas were one of the economic centres of the Duchy of Westphalia.

- Tinsmithing
  This has a long tradition in Olpe, thereby having played an important rôle in the town's life. There was already a smiths’ guild by 1567, the Schmiedeamt. The smiths gradually came to concentrate mainly on making sheet metal or plate. Protected as they were by the guild privileges that were continually confirmed by the Electors, Olpe's smiths managed to secure a virtual monopoly position in sheet metal manufacture in south Westphalia. The bronze memorial at the marketplace recalls the old guild.
- Hammerworks
  These craftsmen also had their own guild and took up the important preparatory work for the tinsmiths, and also for other smiths. The works were powered by water.
- Mining
  There is evidence of copper mining since the mid 16th century in the Rhonard. Alongside many other small pits in Olpe the Grube Rhonard was the biggest. It belonged until 1805 to the Brabeck family estate. Until it closed in 1890, it was the oldest and biggest pit in Olpe. Alongside copper, iron ore was also mined. Moreover, there were also small yields of silver, quicksilver and cinnabar.
- Other important occupations in the Olpe area were the charburners and tanners.

=== Today ===
Midsize and nationally active businesses in various fields are the underpinnings of today's economic life in the district seat. Among these are foundries, tube drawing factories, drop forges, valve factories, machine factories and electronics manufacture. Furthermore, there are many businesses in crafts, trade and service industries. Tourism is also important.

Important enterprises in Olpe are:

- Karl Jungbecker GmbH & Co, Olpe
- Ohm & Häner GmbH & Co. KG, Olpe
- Peterseim GmbH & Co. KG, Olpe
- Gebr. Kemper GmbH & Co. KG, Olpe
- Schell GmbH & Co. KG
- Metallwerke Gustav Imhäuser GmbH &
- Polygonvatro GmbH

== Transport ==
=== Rail and bus transport ===
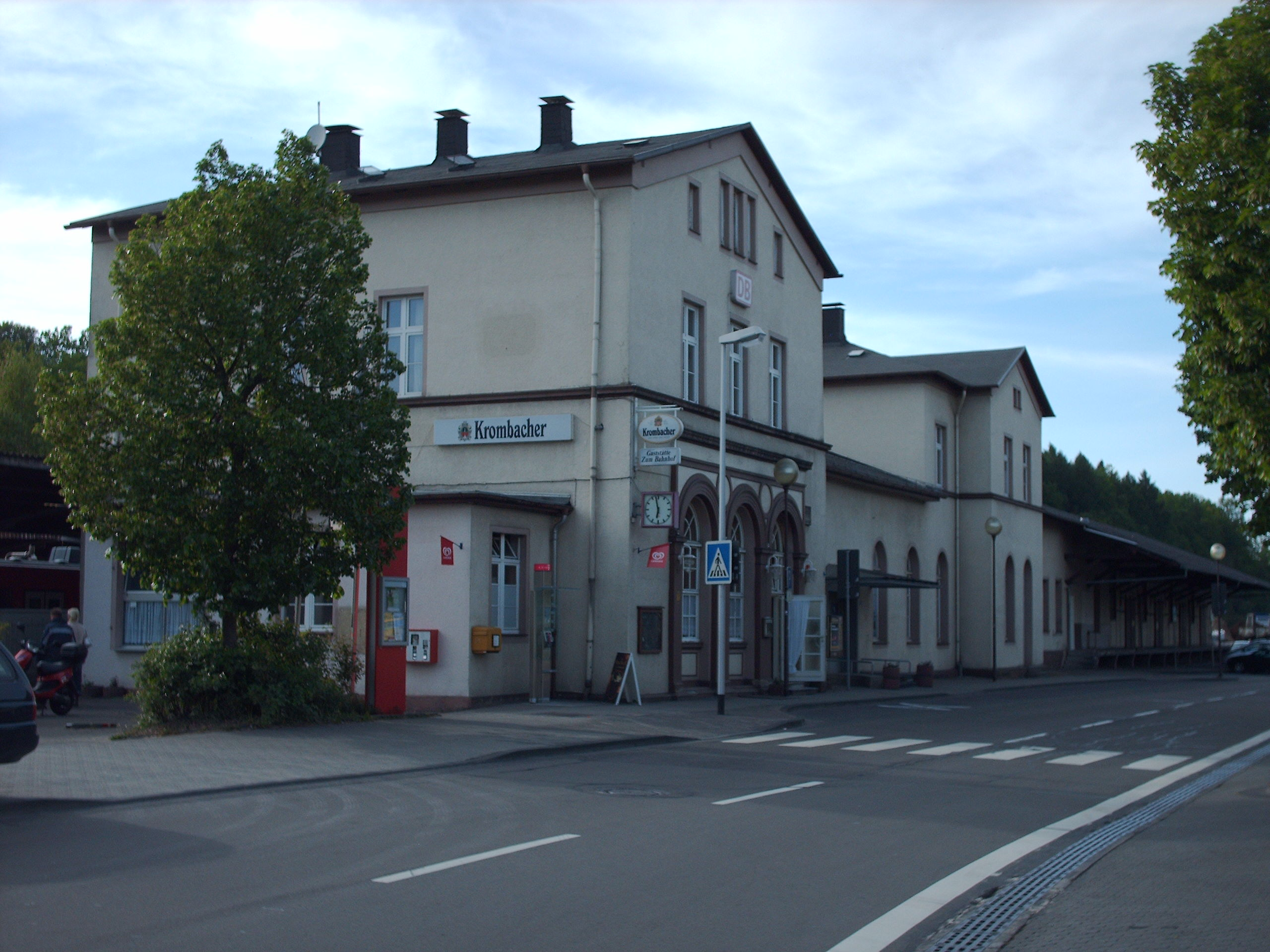
Former railway station building which will be part of the new town hall

Olpe's railway station lies on the single-tracked Biggetalbahn (KBS 442) on which hourly runs the Biggesee-Express (RB 92) of Hessische Landesbahn, section DreiLänderBahn passenger service to Finnentrop with connections to the Ruhr-Sieg-Express (RE 16). In the outlying centre of Sondern is a "lake station" which allows a direct transfer from the railway to a passenger boat. It is the only one in North Rhine-Westphalia.

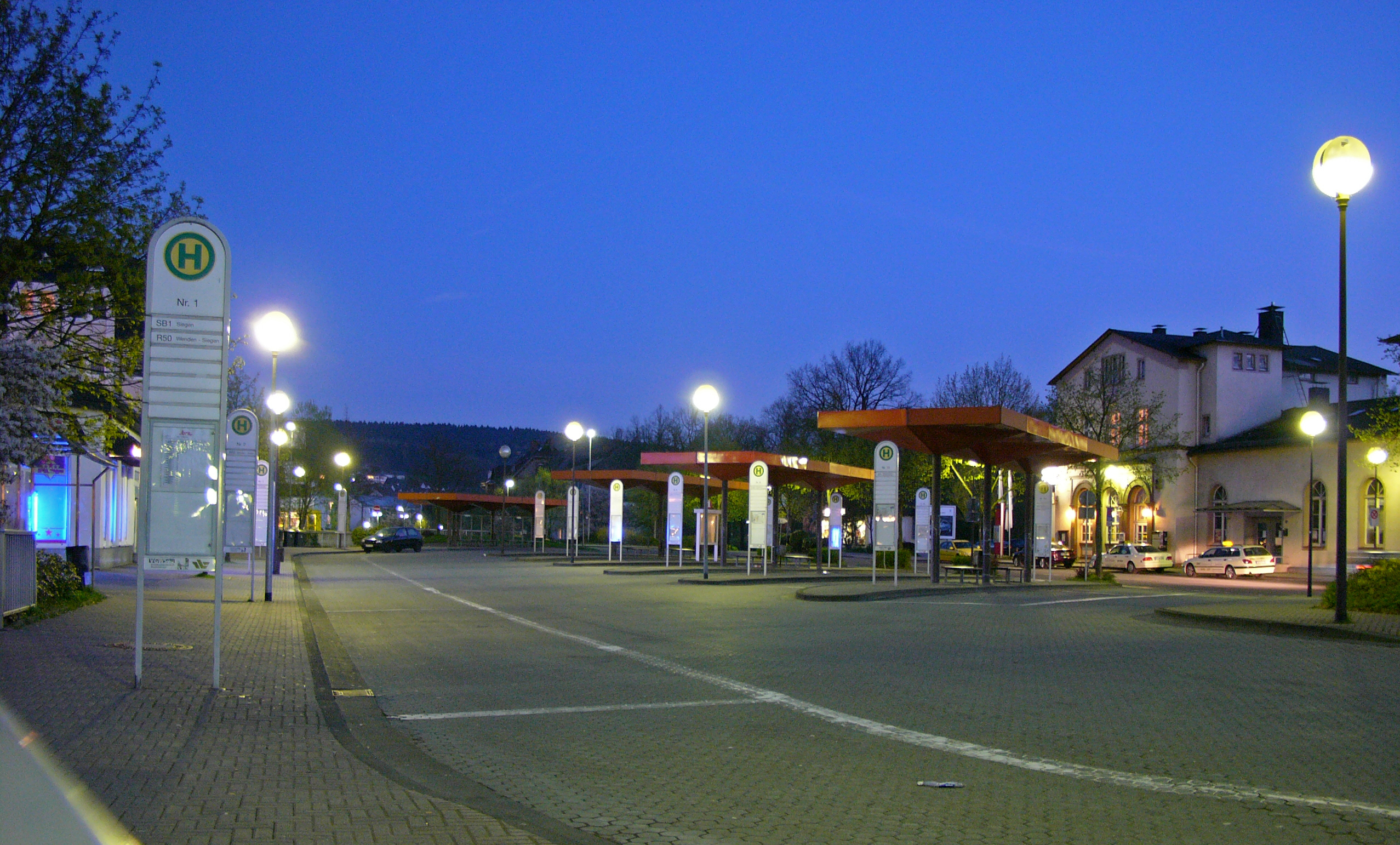
The former central bus station with the former railway station on the right.

The line was built by the Bergisch-Märkische Eisenbahn (railway), going into operation between Finnentrop and Olpe on 1 November 1875. Originally it ran by way of Gerlingen and Rothemühle (both belonging to the municipality of Wenden) to Freudenberg in Westphalia where it joined to the Asdorftalbahn by way of Niederfischbach to Kirchen (Sieg) with a further connection to another line, the Siegstrecke (KBS 460). Another line ran from Olpe by way of Drolshagen and Bergneustadt to Dieringhausen with a connection to the Aggertalbahn (KBS 459). Today, Olpe is the endpoint of the line to Finnentrop. The tracks of the other lines have been removed during the 1990s and the early 2000s. In 2013, the train and bus stations were relocated downstream the Bigge River. On the premises of the former railway station and the neighboring industrial sites, new commercial and recreation areas developed, including a lake-view restaurant. The construction of a new town hall, integrating the old railway station building, is planned.

As for local road transport, many buslines run, joining Olpe to the neighbouring towns and municipalities. The operators are the Verkehrsbetriebe Westfalen-Süd (VWS, "Westphalia-South Transport Services") whose seat is in Siegen, and the Busverkehr Ruhr-Sieg (BRS, “Ruhr-Sieg Bus Transport”). Also, lines of the Regionalverkehr Köln bus company run to Olpe.

Local rail and road transport are integrated with the Westphalia South Transport municipality (Verkehrsgemeinschaft Westfalen Süd, VGWS) as well as the fare association Westfalen-Tarif.

==== Streets and roads ====
There are three traffic thoroughfares in the town of Olpe. Bruchstraße carries north–south traffic to the Autobahn interchanges. Westfälische Straße leaves the historic Old Town towards the northeast while Martinstraße, which is barred to heavy vehicles, leads out of the town centre towards the east. The inner town has at its disposal four free parking garages.

At almost every street junction within the town, a roundabout has been installed. Bundesstraße 55 serves as a northern town bypass and comes together with Bundesstraße 54, which serves as an eastern town bypass, near Rhode. In the south and west, the Autobahnen A 4 and A 45 surround the municipal area. It is thereby possible for heavy traffic to bypass the town altogether on any side.

The town of Olpe is connected to two Autobahnen:

- A 4 (E 40) Aachen–Görlitz, interchange: Wenden (Olpe-Süd)
- A 45 (Sauerlandlinie) (E 41) Dortmund–Aschaffenburg, interchange: Olpe and Wenden (Olpe-Süd)

as well as to the Bundesstraßen 54 (Münster–Lünen–Dortmund–Hagen–Olpe–Siegen–Limburg–Wiesbaden) and 55 (Olpe-Lennestadt-Meschede).

==== Water transport ====
Boat tours can be taken on the Biggesee. The waters are plied from April until late October by two boats run by the Personenschifffahrt Biggesee. A trip round the reservoir lasts roughly two hours, and may be boarded at any of five docks. A few years ago there were still four boats in this Weiße Flotte ("White Fleet"), as it is known. Along with the still available MS Westfalen and MS Bigge, a further boat plied the reservoir. In the reservoir's forward basin (called the Obersee, or “Upper Lake”) was a canal boat by the name of Olpe. Its low-slung design was necessary so that the boat could get under the low railway bridge.

==== Cycling paths ====
Around the Biggesee and the Lister Reservoir (Listertalsperre) is a closed cycling path network. This leads to the Biggedamm in Attendorn. Furthermore, Olpe is connected to the North Rhine-Westphalia Cycling Transport Network (Radverkehrsnetz NRW).

==== Hiking paths ====
Through Olpe runs the 1 080 km-long Wanderweg der Deutschen Einheit (“Hiking Path of German Unity”). Also, there are many smaller, well marked hiking paths that lead around the town.

== Media ==
=== Newspapers ===
The following newspapers publish local editions daily:

- Siegener Zeitung
- Westfälische Rundschau
- Westfalenpost

Furthermore, each of these newspapers also has a local office in Olpe. Currently, all three publish in the morning, although until 2000, the Siegener Zeitung was an afternoon paper. The Siegener Zeitung is a midsize family business with its headquarters in Siegen. The other two papers both belong to the WAZ newspaper group.

Also published, on Wednesdays and Saturdays, is the free advertising sheet Sauerlandkurier with information from the whole Sauerland. Other advertising sheets such as Sonntags-Anzeiger, Stadtanzeiger and the Sauerländer Wochenanzeiger, have been discontinued.

On special occasions such as the shooting festival, the Sauerländer Börse, a glossy DIN-A-4-format advertising sheet, appears.

Until some time around 1980, Olpe was the publishing site of the Sauerländisches Volksblatt.

=== Radio ===
The Olpe district has no local transmitter or radio station at its disposal. Current news about Olpe is to be had only through the WDR 2 programme from the Siegen regional studio, sending out news from south Westphalia on the half-hour. With a decision on 28 April 2006, however, Olpe was chosen by the Landesanstalt für Medien Nordrhein-Westfalen (LfM), the responsible overseeing authority for radio broadcasts in North Rhine-Westphalia, as a possible area for expansion of local broadcasting. An organizing association has existed for many years.

=== Television ===
Olpe belongs to WDR Fernsehen’s Siegen studio’s broadcast area. The Lokalzeit Südwestfalen reports on the region.

== Public institutions ==
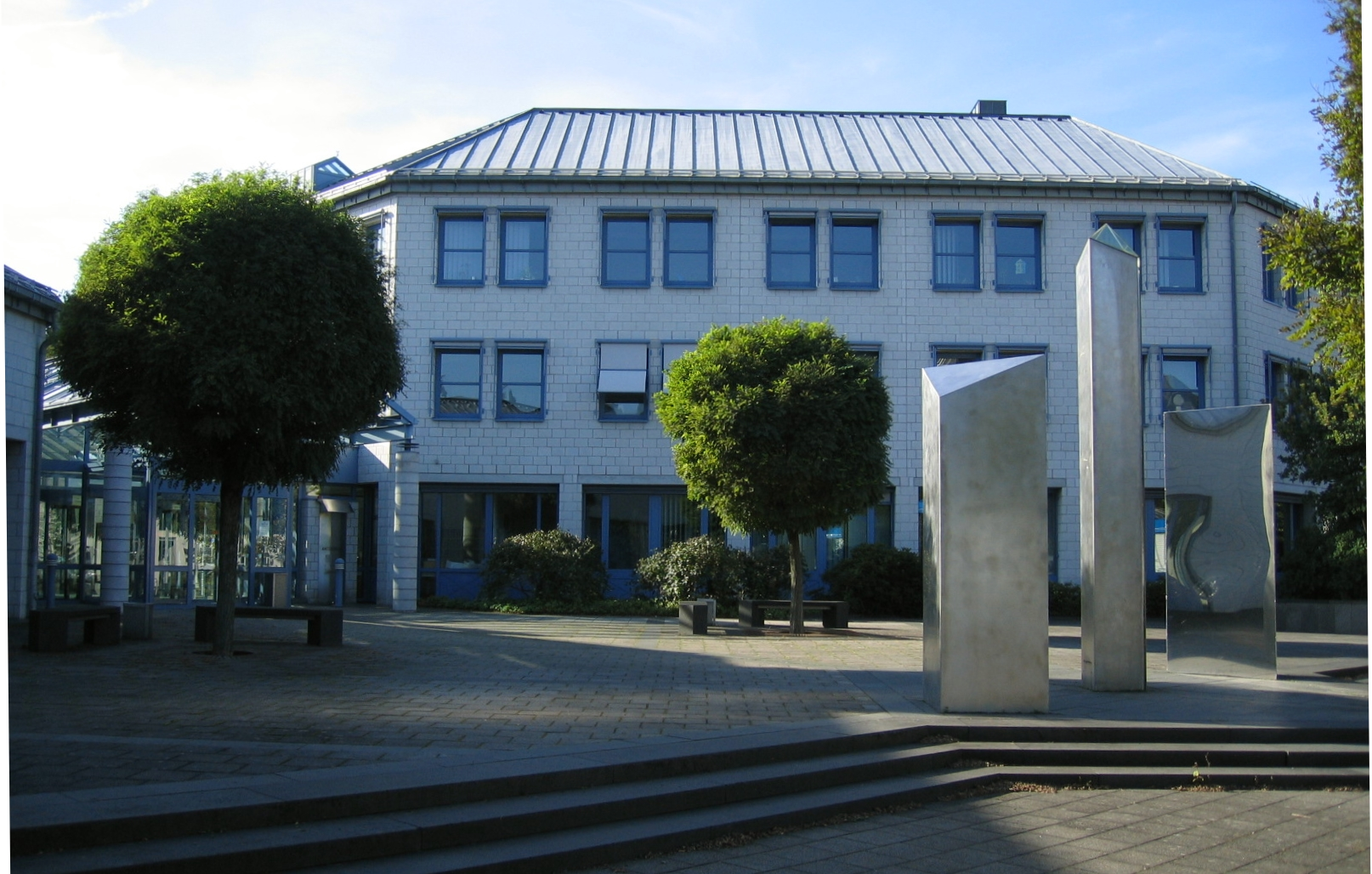
Olpe courthouse

- Agentur für Arbeit Siegen, Olpe office (employment agency)
- Amtsgericht Olpe (court)
- Finanzamt Olpe (financial office)
- Regionalforstamt Kurkölnisches Sauerland, Olpe service building (regional forest office)

Since 1 August 2007, there has been this current forest office made up of the former Attendorn (partly) and Olpe forest offices. The first time that a forest office in Olpe was mentioned was in 1810.

- Kreishaus Olpe (district administration)
- LWL-Archäologie für Westfalen, Olpe branch

In a former school on 31 August 1982, the Olpe branch was officially opened. The main task is taking care of monuments in the Regierungsbezirk of Arnsberg. This is done through undertaking to propose monumental protection, taking part in procedures as sponsors of public concerns, onsite studies, publishing work and “small monument care” (exchange with interested persons or groups).

=== St.-Martinus-Hospital ===
The hospital was founded in 1856 under the St. Martinus Olpe parish's sponsorship and at first it was run by two Vincentine sisters. Each year, just under 11,000 patients, mainly from Olpe, Wenden and Drolshagen are treated. A staff of roughly 800 full-time and part-time workers have 385 beds in their care. The hospital has a surgical clinic, a medicinal clinic, a women's clinic, an anaesthesia department, an intensive care unit whose main task is pain control and diagnostic radiology, and a psychiatric department. Sisters of the Olpe Franciscan congregation took over nursing duties in 1900. As of 1997, the St.-Martinus-Hospital was run as a not-for-profit limited company (GmbH), and it merged in 2000 with the Catholic St.-Josef-Hospital in Lennestadt-Altenhundem into the Katholische Hospitalgesellschaft Südwestfalen gGmbH (gemeinnützige Gesellschaft mit beschränkter Haftung, or "not-for-profit company with limited liability"). Attached to the hospital are, among other things, a nursing school, a course in geriatric care and a mobile dialysis centre. Since that time, the Franciscan sisters have no longer been working at the St.-Martinus-Hospital, and the convent found there was dissolved in late 2005.

=== Kinderhospiz Balthasar ===
When this children's hospice opened in 1998, it was the first of its kind in Germany. "A second home for the whole family" is one of the hospice's guiding principles. As well as living and laughing, dying and weeping can take place here. The whole family is to some extent guided over years until the child's death. Each year, several stays of up to four weeks each are possible.

The sponsor is the Gemeinnützige Gesellschaft der Franziskanerinnen zu Olpe mbH ("Not-for-profit Company of the Franciscan Sisters at Olpe, limited", or GFO). It is one-third financed by sponsors such as longterm care insurance and two-thirds by donations and by the families themselves.

=== Education ===
Olpe is a regionally important school centre. There are many different educational institutions here.

Schools and educational institutions in Olpe
Elementary schools	Secondary schools
Gemeinschaftsgrundschule Hohenstein	Sekundarschule Olpe
Gemeinschaftsgrundschule Dahl	Sankt-Franziskus-Gymnasium, owned by the Franciscan Sisters
Katholische Bekenntnisgrundschule Auf dem Gallenberg	Städtisches Gymnasium Olpe
Katholische Bekenntnisgrundschule Düringerschule	Professional schools
Gemeinschaftsgrundschule Hakemicke	Bäckerfachschule
Katholische Franz-Hitze-Bekenntnisgrundschule Rhode	Berufskolleg des Kreises Olpe (vocational college)
Special schools	Fortbildungsakademien für Gesundheitshilfe (Nursing school)
Pestalozzischule, Förderschule Lernen des Kreises Olpe	
Max-von-der-Grün-Schule, LWL special school with emphasis on bodily and motor development	Other
Michael-Ende-Schule, LWL-Förderschule, emphasis on speech	Rettungsfachschule des DRK (Red Cross rescue school)
LWL-Förderschule, emphasis on sight	Music school
LWL-Förderschule,. emphasis on hearing and communication	Volkshochschule (Adult education center)

The former Realschule Olpe and Hakemicke Hauptschule merged to the new Sekundarschule between 2013 and 2018. It is located in the former Hakemicke Hauptschule. The building of the former Realschule was abandoned and will be demolished.

== Notable people ==
=== Sons and daughters of the town ===
- Johann Bergmann von Olpe (1460–1531), theologian and publisher
- Rudolf Bertram (1893–1975), medic
- Mother Maria Theresia Bonzel (1830–1905), beatified founder of the Sisters of St. Francis of Perpetual Adoration
- Rötger Hundt (1711–1773), theologian
- Anton Deimel (1865–1954), theologian and researcher
- Jochen Feldmann (born 1961), physicist
- Adolf von Hatzfeld (1892–1957), poet
- Franz Hitze (1851–1921), sociopolitical and theologian
- Michael Kügler (born 1981), footballer
- Monica Pick-Hieronimi (born 1943), sopranist and professor of music
- Patrick Rakovsky (born 1993), football player
- Johannes Rosenthal (1903–1975), Pallottine bishop and first Bishop of Queenstown in South Africa
- Paul-Werner Scheele (1928–2019), Bishop of Würzburg
- Josef Schrage (1881–1953), Landrat and Member of the Landtag
- Joseph Schrage (1818–1892), Wisconsin businessman and public official
- Sigmar Solbach (born 1946), actor
- Helmut Stahl (born 1947), politician (CDU)
- Hermann Tilke (born 1951), architect

=== Famous people connected with the town ===
- Johann Nikolaus Düringer (c. 1700–1756), sculptor
- Wilhelm Marx (1851–1924), Chief Mayor of Düsseldorf (buried in Olpe)
- Theodor Mietens (1804–1885), printer and cofounder of the Evangelical parish in Olpe
- Herbert Straube (1904–1977), celebrity entrepreneur in the postwar years
- Otto Müller (1870–1944), priest and resistance fighter in National Socialist times
- Lorenz Jaeger (1892–1975), Cardinal
- Hans Krüger (1902–1971), Minister for Displaced Persons in the Erhardt Cabinet
- Gerhard Schneider (born 1938), collector of degenerate art
- Gerd vom Bruch (born 1941), former trainer for Spvg. Olpe (1972–1976)
