= Finnentrop–Freudenberg railway =

Railway line in Germany

Finnentrop–Freudenberg
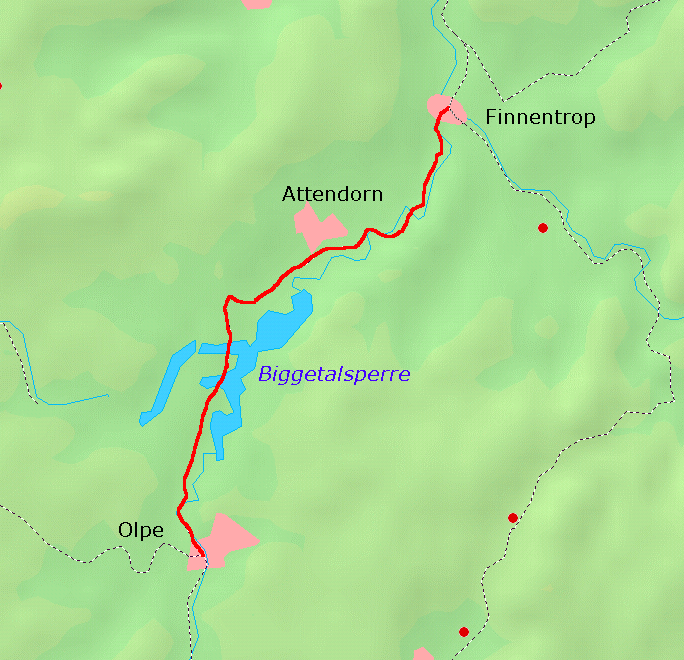

Overview
- Line number: 2864

Service
- Route number: 442

Technical
- Line length: 43.6 km

The Bigge Valley Railway (German: Biggetalbahn) is a 24-kilometre-long, single-tracked branch line from Finnentrop station via Attendorn and Olpe to Freudenberg in western Germany. It is non-electrified and the section of line from Olpe to Freudenberg is now closed. The section between Olpe and Finnentrop is regularly worked by local railway passenger services (SPNV). The line runs from Finnentrop to Wenden in the valley of the River Bigge.

From Finnentrop to Olpe the Bigge Valley Railway is operated as Route no. 442.

== See also ==
- History of rail transport in Germany
