= Oelinghausen Monastery =

Monastery in Germany

- Kloster Oelinghausen
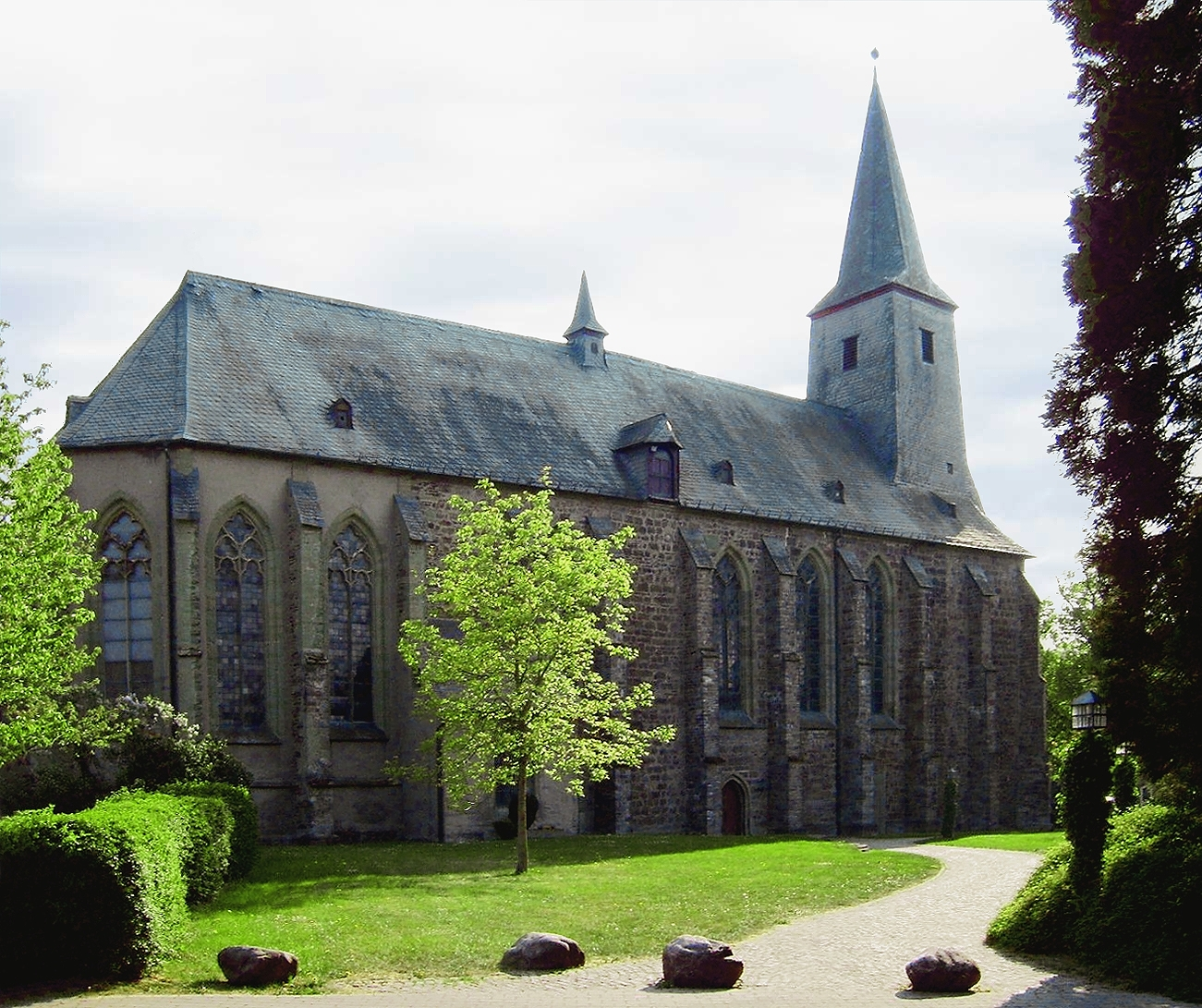
- Former monastery church

- Location within North Rhine-Westphalia

Monastery information
- Order: Premonstratensian monastery
- Established: c. 1174
- Disestablished: 1804
- Dedication: Saint Peter and the Virgin Mary
- Diocese: Archdiocese of Paderborn

People
- Founders: Siegenand von Basthusen and Hathewigis (disputed)

Architecture
- Heritage designation: Listed monument

Site
- Location: Holzen, Arnsberg, North Rhine-Westphalia, Germany
- Coordinates: 51°24′45.50″N 07°56′39″E

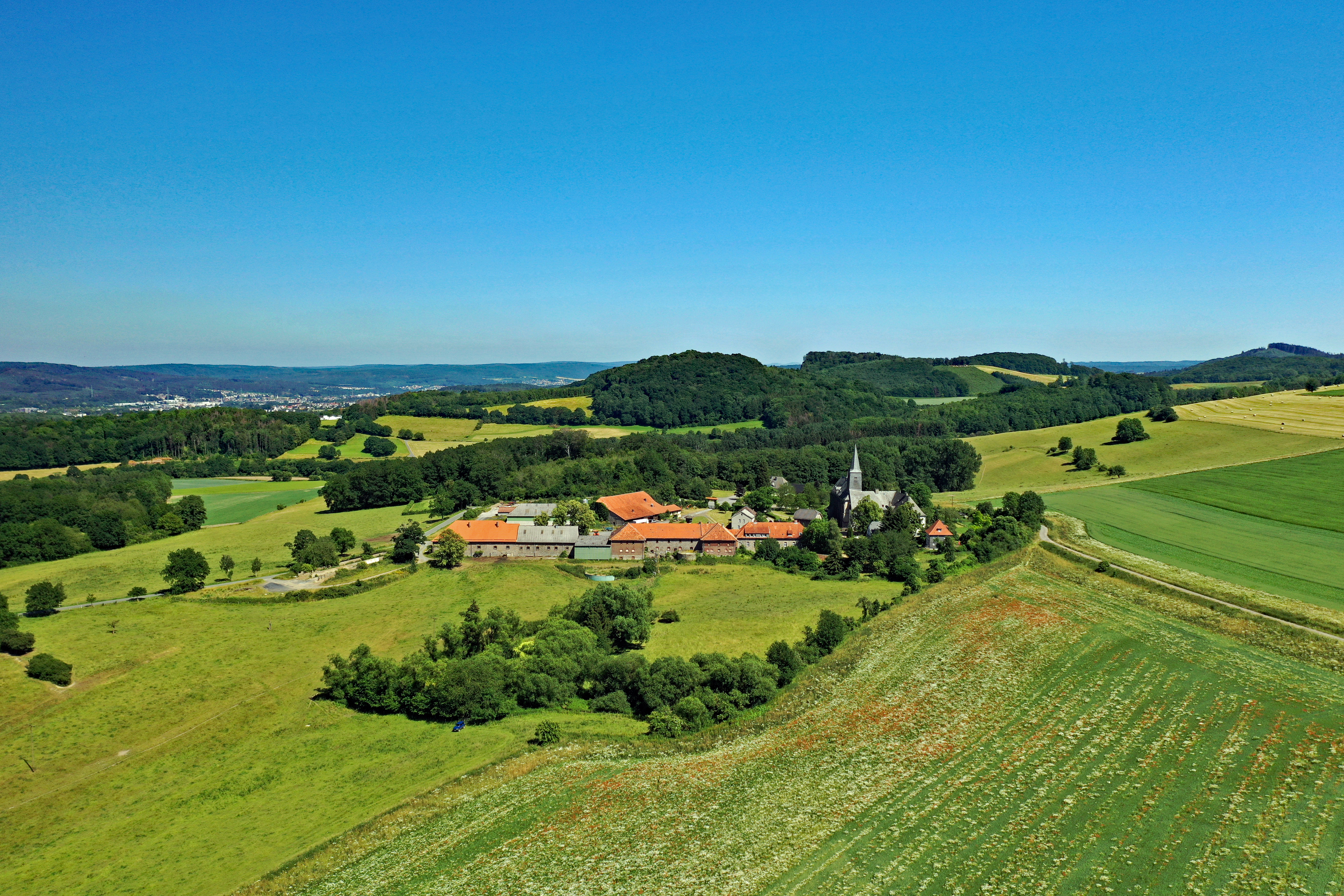
Aerial view of Oelinghausen Monastery

Oelinghausen Monastery, located in the Holzen district of Arnsberg, North Rhine-Westphalia, Germany, was founded around 1174 as a double monastery before transitioning into a Premonstratensian nunnery. In the 17th century, it was converted into a secular canoness foundation, but later reverted to the Premonstratensian order. The monastery was dissolved during the secularization of 1804.

The monastery church, dedicated to Saint Peter and the Virgin Mary, has served as a parish church since the dissolution. Predominantly Gothic in style, the church dates primarily to the 14th century, with its interior uniformly redesigned in the Baroque style during the 18th century. Notable features include the Kölsche Madonna, a statue from the early 13th century, and an organ with components from the 16th century.

Since 1992, the restored monastery buildings have been home to the Sisters of Saint Mary Magdalene Postel. A monastery garden museum has been established in recent years. The monastery and its associated estate are situated in a largely agricultural and forested area, distant from the nearest settlements of Herdringen and Holzen, within the Oelinghausen Landscape Protection Area.

== Historical development ==
=== Founding Period ===
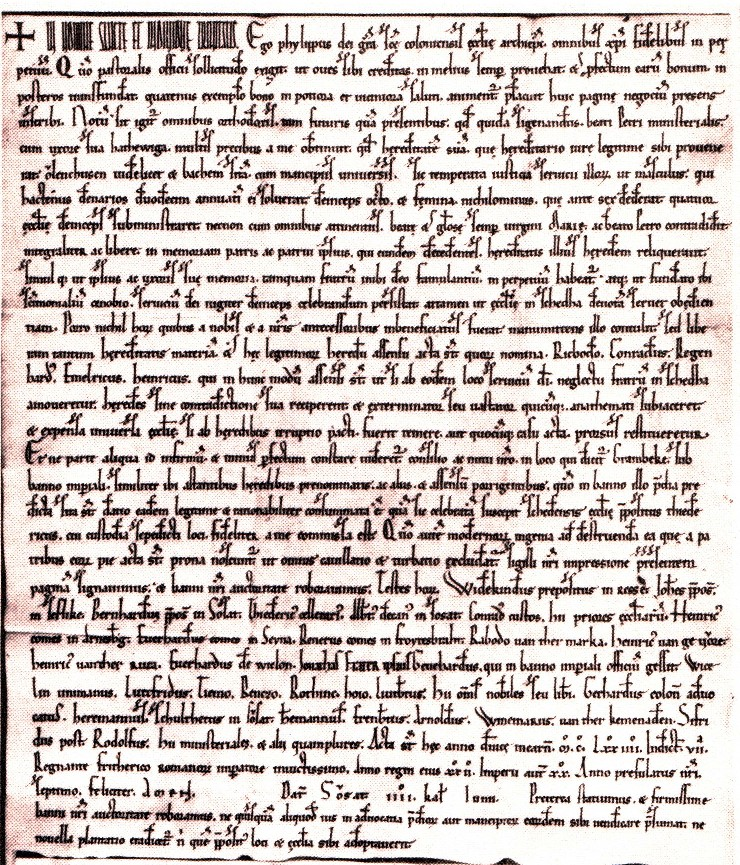
Founding charter of 1174, issued by Archbishop Philipp von Heinsberg

According to traditional accounts, the monastery was founded in 1174 by Siegenand von Basthusen, a ministerialis in the service of the Archbishop of Cologne, and his wife Hathewigis. The founders endowed the monastery with properties in Oelinghausen and Bachum. Years later, Siegenand made further donations and entrusted the monastery's advocacy to Count Reiner von Freusburg. After his death, he was buried in the monastery church.

Historian and archivist Manfred Wolf has recently questioned this narrative, arguing that the endowments by Siegenand were insufficient to sustain a monastic community. Wolf suggests that these were supplementary donations and that the actual founding occurred earlier, between 1152 and 1174. He posits that the Oberhof Oelinghausen, previously held by the Counts of Northeim and later by Henry the Lion, was transferred to Scheda Monastery, which then established Oelinghausen as a daughter house. Initially, only male religious lived there, with nuns joining later.

This contrasts with the traditional view that women initially resided in Oelinghausen, later forming a double monastery where canons and canonesses lived in separate quarters within the same complex. Historian Edeltraud Klueting suggests that Oelinghausen was originally a women’s institution, with Scheda Monastery near Wickede providing pastoral care. Only after a period of consolidation did evidence of a double convent emerge. Such arrangements were not uncommon in early Premonstratensian history until the order’s General Chapter in 1188 mandated the separation of men’s and women’s monasteries. The double monastery structure in Oelinghausen persisted at least until the early 13th century, with references to “fratrum et sororum” (brothers and sisters) as late as 1238.

Oelinghausen was not independent; it was initially under the abbot of Scheda Monastery and, from 1228, under the paternity of Wedinghausen Monastery in Arnsberg. Unlike Rumbeck Monastery, Oelinghausen retained the right to freely elect its provost. Klueting suggests that the shift in paternity coincided with the end of the double monastery, though a transitional period likely extended into the 1240s.

=== Growth and prosperity ===
The Archbishops of Cologne provided significant support to Kloster Oelinghausen. In 1174, Philipp von Heinsberg confirmed its foundation, exempted it from the parish of Hüsten in 1179, and granted it a tithe. After 1194, Adolf I. released the monastery from archdiaconal jurisdiction, donated a forest, and affirmed its existing rights and possessions. In 1208, Bruno IV. freed it from noble advocacy. Engelbert von Berg donated a revered statue of the enthroned Madonna and likely secured papal confirmation of the foundation from Pope Honorius III in 1225. The papal bull stated that the “prior and convent of Oelinghausen, the place, and those dedicated to divine service there, along with all their goods,” were placed under the protection of Saints Peter and Paul and the Pope himself, confirming all freedoms granted by the Archbishop of Cologne.

Following the archbishops’ example, numerous nobles and ministerials endowed the monastery. As early as 1184, Simon von Tecklenburg made donations. In the early 13th century, Adolf I. von Dassel and Hermann II. von Ravensberg contributed as well.

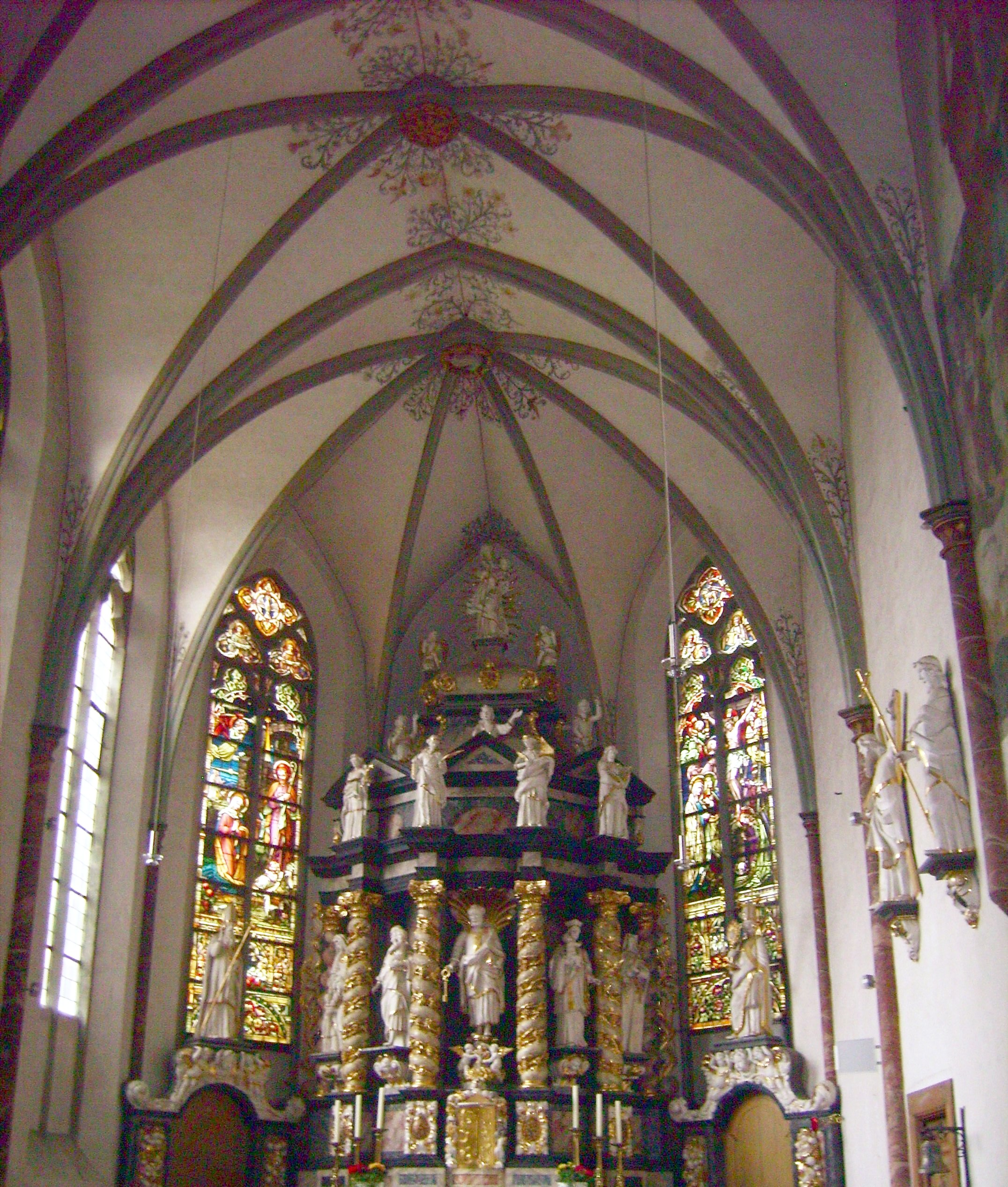
Church interior with high altar by Wilhelm Spliethoven, 1712

The Counts of Arnsberg were the monastery’s primary benefactors until the end of their rule. In 1204, Gottfried II. emerged as a key supporter, mediating disputes between the monastery and the Herdringen community. Other donors followed their lead. In 1194, Conradus von Allagen and his heirs gifted their estate near Allagen for their salvation. Between 1207 and 1212, Lambert, dean of Paderborn, transferred his properties near Neheim to the monastery. Despite its exemption from advocacy, the Counts of Arnsberg exerted significant influence over the convent’s life, even deposing an unpopular provost. As principal patrons, they expected good conduct and gradually assumed a quasi-advocacy role.

In 1232, the first known provost, Radolf, secured the income from the Altenrüthen parish for the provostship, leading to decades of disputes with Kloster Grafschaft, which regained the rights in the 15th century. During Radolf’s tenure, Gottfried II. von Arnsberg also transferred patronage rights over the Hachen chapel to Oelinghausen.

In the 14th century, Oelinghausen formed prayer confraternities with other monasteries and foundations, including Varlar, Siegburg, St. Alban in Trier, and Altenberg. By the mid-14th century, a confraternity dedicated to St. John the Evangelist was established, admitting benefactors, donors, and local peasants. Noble and distant members held largely nominal memberships, with limited participation in religious activities. The confraternity maintained its own altar in the church, held property, and played a key role in funding the hospital. Its influence waned in the 17th century.

Beyond choral prayer, the monastery supported a poorhouse and hospital, which received dedicated revenues by the 13th century. The hospital continued to operate into the late 15th century.

=== Late medieval and early modern crisis ===
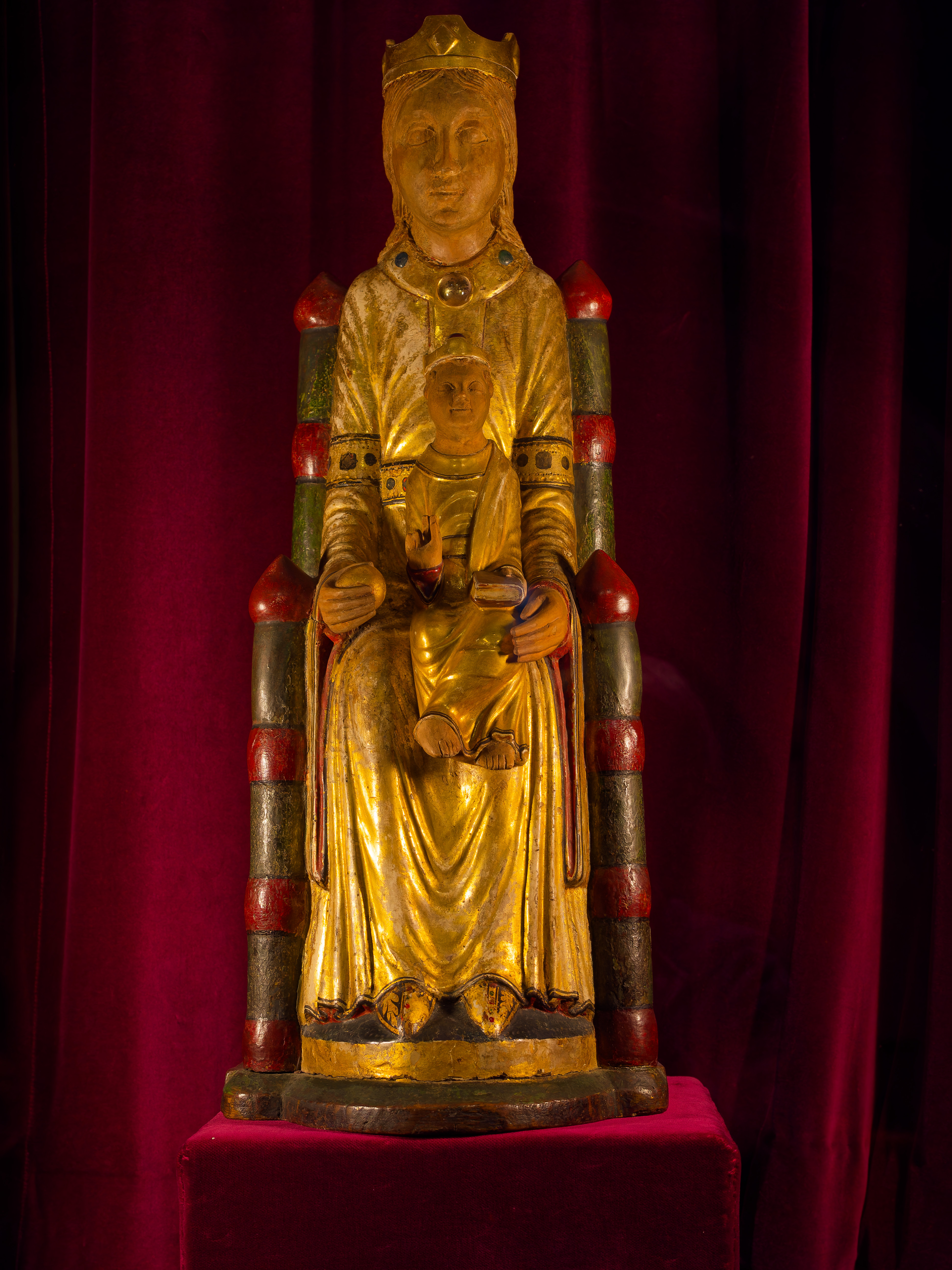
Venerated image of the “Kölsche Madonna” (57 cm, linden wood, 13th century)

In 1391, the Archbishop of Cologne praised Kloster Oelinghausen for its diligent observance of divine services, noting it surpassed other monasteries. However, significant financial difficulties were evident. The archbishop exempted the monastery from the costly obligation of raising hunting dogs and condemned the migration of dependent peasants to towns and free territories, describing it as a “theft” that caused substantial harm. As lord of the Duchy of Westphalia, he prohibited cities in his jurisdiction from admitting these fugitives, declared granting them citizenship unlawful, and mandated heavy fines and forcible return to the monastery in chains.

Additional challenges emerged. There was a growing trend toward accumulating personal wealth and relaxing enclosure rules. In the early 15th century, the plague struck heavily, killing many nuns. The need to admit numerous young sisters prompted Archbishop Dietrich II. von Moers to emphasize strict enclosure. He decreed that “the young women who have taken the religious habit in Kloster Oelinghausen to serve God must not be distracted by frequent and unnecessary contact with secular persons,” prohibiting access to the inner cloister. These efforts were largely unsuccessful, with reports from the 15th century even noting a guesthouse operated by a Wedinghausen convent member.

The Soest Feud (1444–1449) brought significant economic burdens. During his tenure from 1483 to 1505, Provost Heinrich von Rhemen introduced the standard Premonstratensian habit, replacing previous attire. However, he failed to prevent the formation of individual households. To maintain external donations, the General Abbot permitted families to transfer secular goods for the nuns’ personal use in 1491, contrary to the order’s statutes. This further relaxed the monastic lifestyle. A shortage of priests hindered the provost’s liturgical duties, prompting the General Chapter of Abbots to call for more chaplains or canons. Amid these challenges, Provost Gottfried von Ulfte resigned in 1539, leaving the position vacant for a decade. Regular worship could not be consistently maintained thereafter.

In 1548, Archbishop Adolf III of Schaumburg conducted a visitation. The prioress, a sister of Landdrost Henning von Böckenförde gen. Schüngel, admitted that the monastic rule was only partially observed, with individual households being the primary issue. She noted no adherence to Lutheran teachings. Despite minor efforts to enforce the rule, individual households were not fundamentally challenged, and life at Oelinghausen increasingly resembled a secular canoness foundation.

In 1583, troops under the Protestant-leaning Archbishop of Cologne, Gebhard Truchsess, occupied the monastery. A secular administrator was appointed, and Lutheran preachers unsuccessfully attempted to convert the nuns. Most women fled to their families. After Gebhard’s defeat, the nuns returned, but the monastery had been looted, exacerbating existing financial difficulties. Under Kaspar von Fürstenberg’s leadership, a group of related nobles drafted new constitutions, proposing the abolition of the provost’s role and placing sole authority with the prioress. Fürstenberg secured the election of his sister, Ottilia von Fürstenberg (1585–1621), as prioress.

=== Revival and Transformation into a Canoness Foundation ===
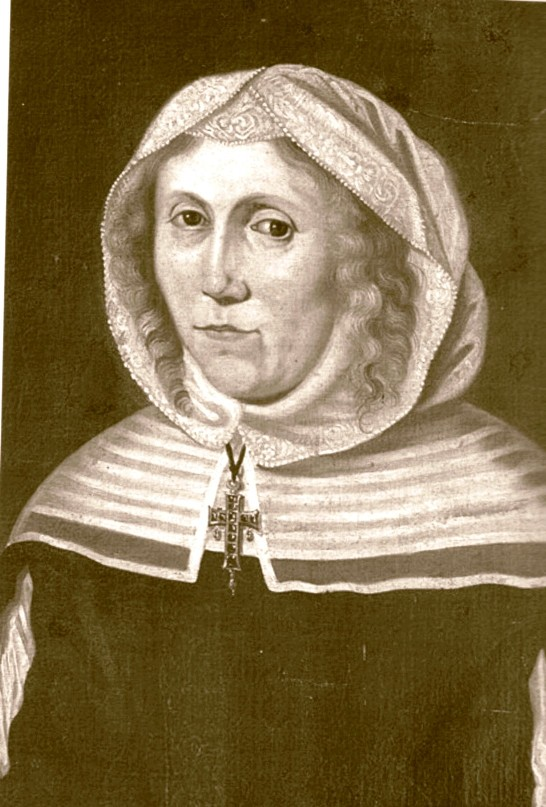
Ottilia von Fürstenberg (contemporary painting)

Over time, Kloster Oelinghausen had become a favored residence for Ottilia von Fürstenberg’s mother, evolving into a family hub, contrary to its constitutions. Ottilia’s brothers, Kaspar von Fürstenberg and Bishop Dietrich of Paderborn, significantly contributed to the monastery’s financial recovery. Dietrich alone donated 4,334 thalers in memory of his mother for a memorial and sacramental foundation, with his total contributions reaching 10,000 thalers. These funds enabled the reconstruction of the abbey and the restoration of the provost’s office. Ottilia resolved property disputes, recovered lost assets, cleared 20,000 thalers in debts, and accumulated a surplus of 13,000 thalers. The monastery’s prosperity was evident in its ability to host the Archbishop of Cologne and the Bishop of Paderborn simultaneously, as noted in a visitation record. However, this period also saw raids by Dutch mercenaries, forcing temporary flight, and two plague outbreaks.

Ottilia von Fürstenberg, also abbess of the Heerse Foundation, aimed to transform Oelinghausen into a canoness foundation, a goal facilitated by the internal weaknesses of Wedinghausen. Tensions arose after the 1613 election of Abbot Gottfried Reichmann, who sought to reintegrate Oelinghausen into the Premonstratensian Order. Much of the Duchy of Westphalia’s nobility, led by the Fürstenbergs, supported Ottilia. In 1616, Dietrich von Fürstenberg requested Pope Paul V’s permission for the transformation. An investigation found no monastic observance (“nulla regularis vigeat observantia”), with the women living without enclosure, vows, or religious habits. In 1617, the Pope dissolved Oelinghausen’s ties to the Premonstratensian Order, and in 1618, it became a canoness foundation. A new constitution separated abbey and chapter assets, stipulating that, besides the abbess (as the head was now called), twenty canonesses would reside there. Ottilia’s successors continued this course.

=== Return to the premonstratensian order ===
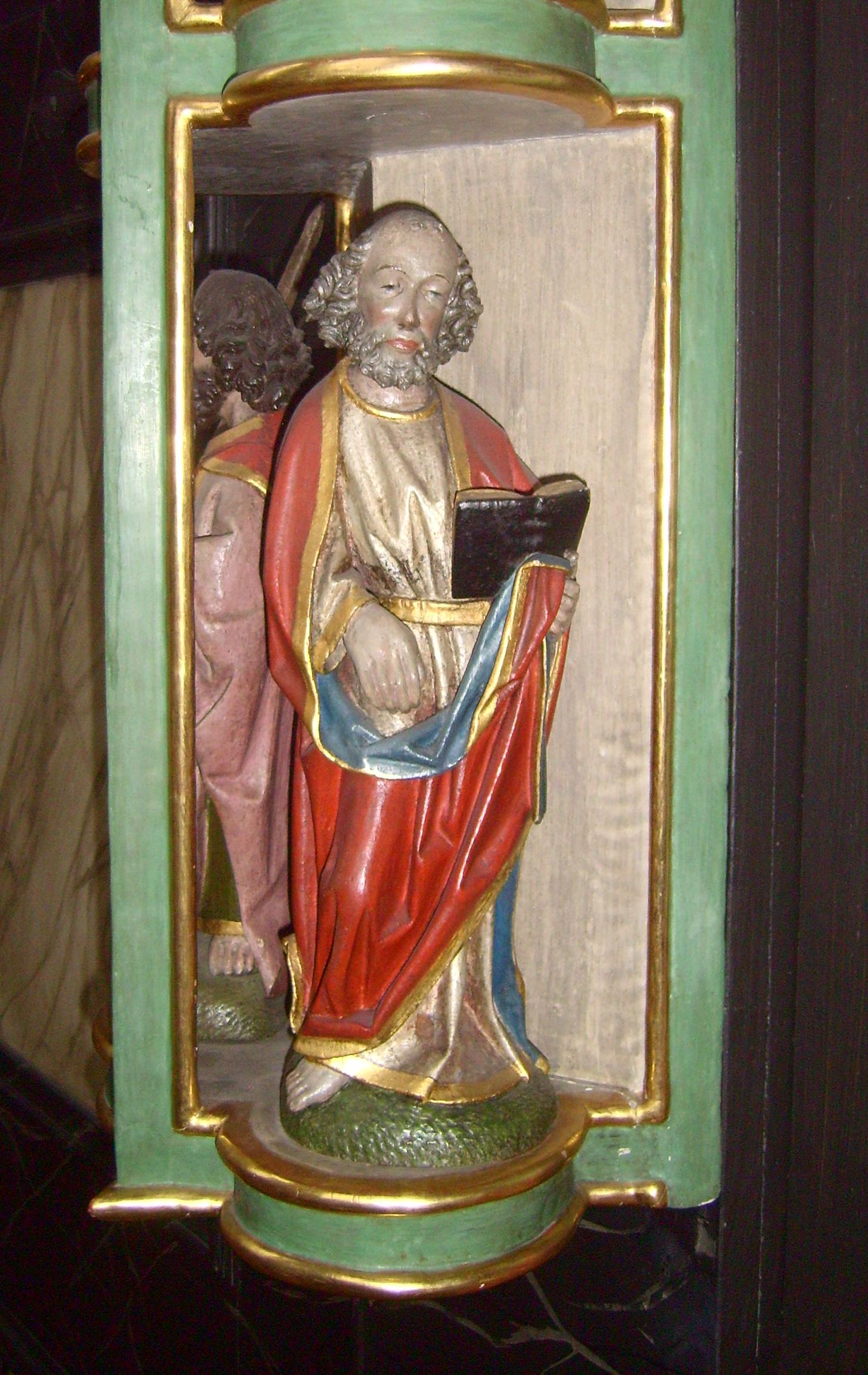
Late Gothic apostle figure at the Johannes altar

During the Thirty Years’ War, the canonesses repeatedly fled Oelinghausen. The Premonstratensians, rejecting the separation, sought to reclaim it. After a 13-year legal battle, Nuncio Fabio Chigi (later Pope Alexander VII) ruled against the canoness foundation in 1641. Wedinghausen’s abbot forcibly reoccupied Oelinghausen, and the canonesses left with compensation.

The monastery was repopulated by canonesses from Rumbeck Monastery. Financial recovery by the late 17th century allowed Provost Nikolaus Engel to build a new provost’s residence. Under Provost Theodor Sauter (1704–1732), a new convent building was erected, the church interior was lavishly decorated, and the organ was expanded.

=== Dissolution and Subsequent Use ===
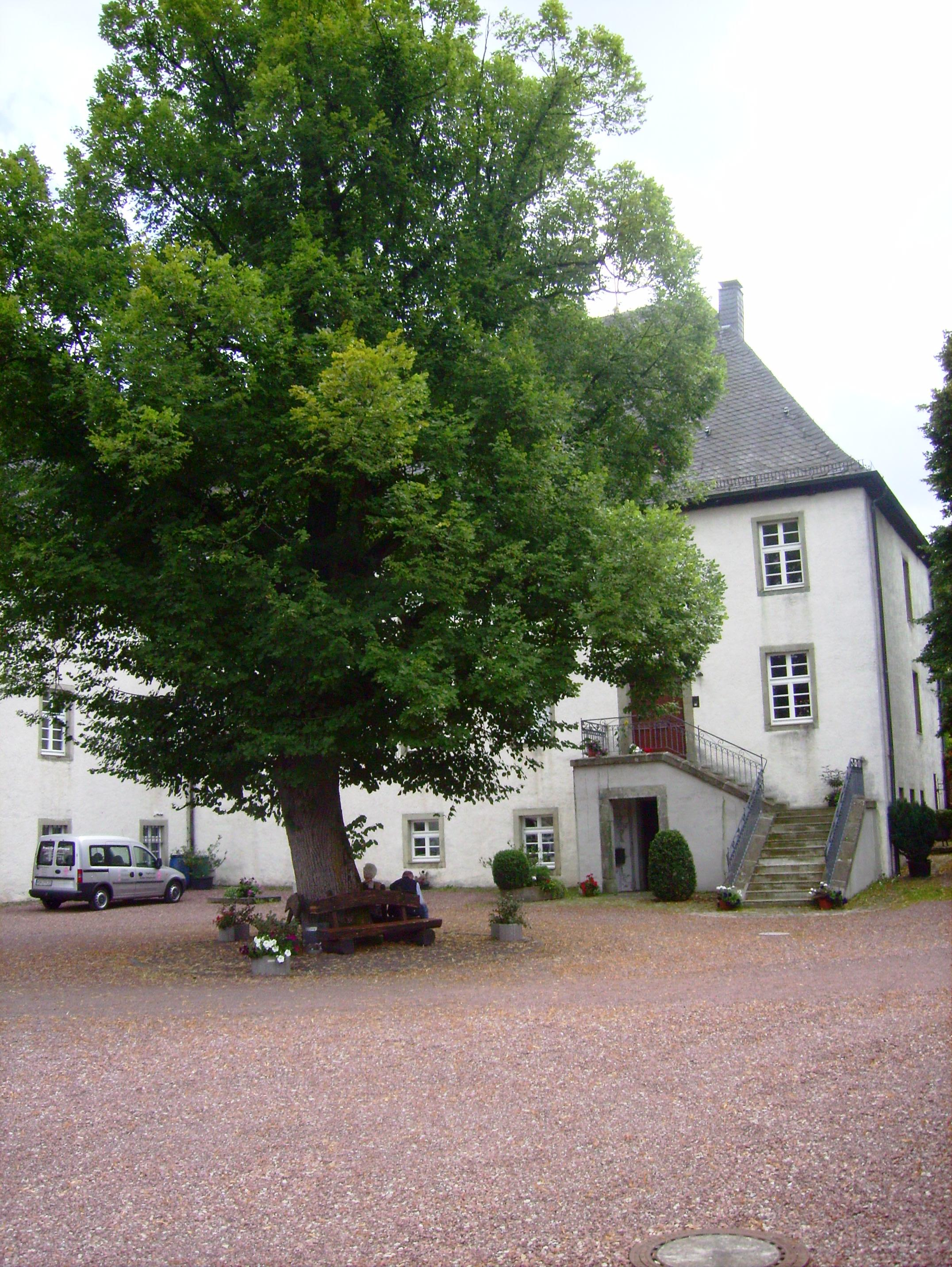
Monastery building

In the late 18th century, the rise of the Catholic Enlightenment in the Duchy of Westphalia and the Electorate of Cologne threatened the monastery’s existence. Wedinghausen conventual Friedrich Georg Pape prompted some nuns to complain about the provost’s authoritarian leadership and request a visitation. Maria Balduin Neesen, an Enlightenment advocate critical of monastic life, conducted the inquiry. He condemned “monastic despotism,” harshly criticized community members and clergy, and forced the prioress and cellarer to resign. The provost was deposed in 1789. Although Neesen unsuccessfully advocated converting the monastery into a welfare institution for bourgeois and noble women, the community remained internally divided. Younger nuns, influenced by ideals of freedom and equality, defied the prioress.

In 1804, following the Duchy of Westphalia’s transfer to Hesse-Darmstadt, the monastery was dissolved during secularization. The estate was initially leased and purchased in 1828 by Baron von Fürstenberg of Herdringen. In 1806, a curacy benefice was established based on early modern Fürstenberg endowments, with the last monastery priest, Johann von Nagel, as its first incumbent. The independent parish of St. Petri Oelinghausen was founded in 1904. Today, it forms part of the Kloster Oelinghausen pastoral network alongside St. Antonius, St. Vitus Herdringen, and Heilig Geist Hüsten.

From 1956, Mariannhill Missionaries resided in Oelinghausen briefly. Since 1992, the restored monastery building has been occupied by the Sisters of St. Maria Magdalena Postel. In 2005, a monastery garden museum was established in the former stable, operated by the Friends of Oelinghausen Monastery Association. The association also organizes guided tours of the church and monastery complex. For over forty years, the church has hosted “musica sacra” concerts. The Baroque apostle figures were named Monument of the Month in Westphalia-Lippe in March 2014.

== Structure ==
=== Properties ===
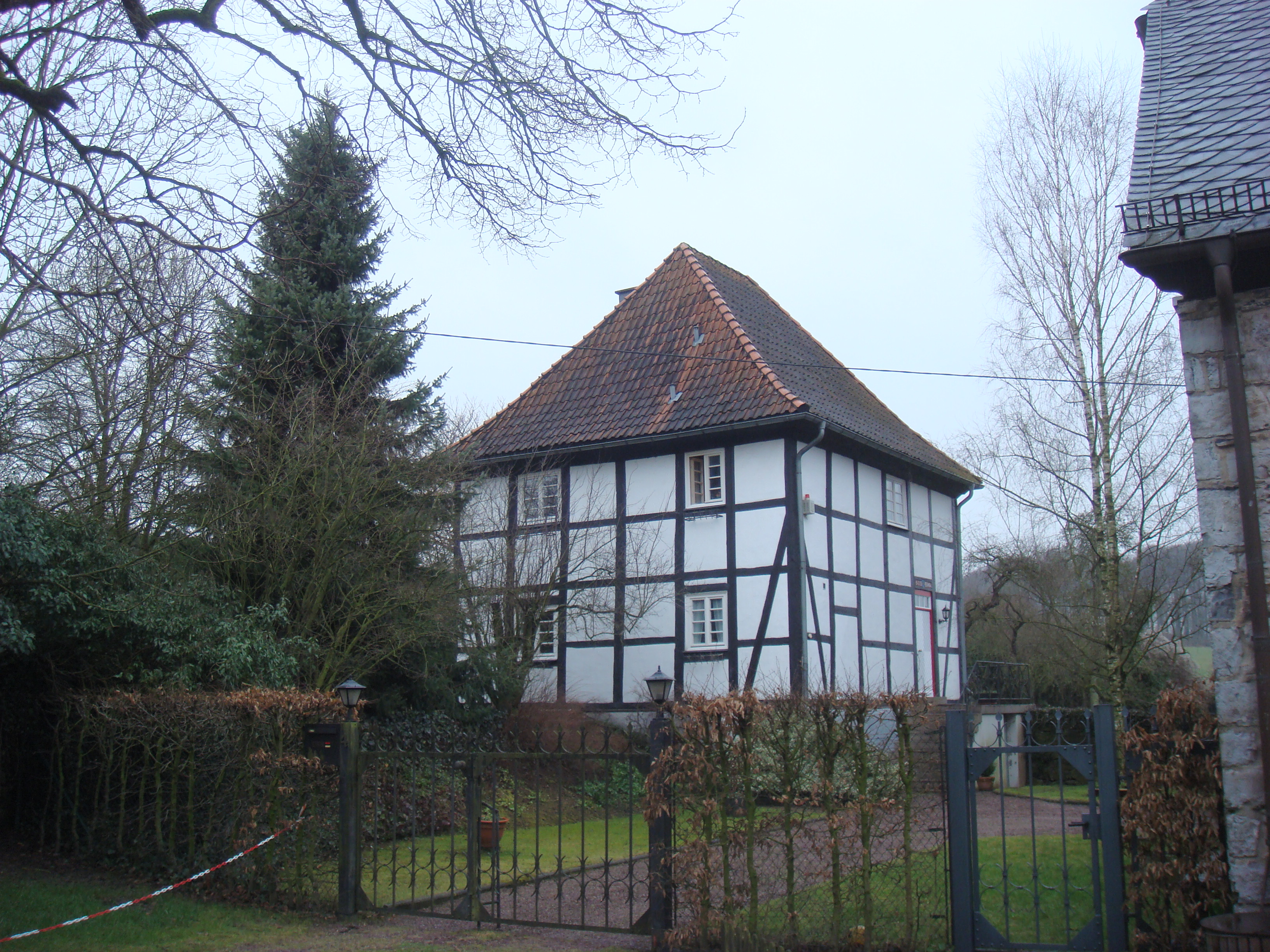
So-called Schäferhaus, possibly a residential building from the canoness foundation period

Following its establishment, Kloster Oelinghausen grew increasingly prosperous, acquiring tithes and estates by the 13th century. In 1220, Bruno, Abbot of Deutz, transferred the villications of the main estates in Linne (Kirchlinde) and Ruggingshausen to the monastery, specifying the required dues. These properties sparked disputes over subsequent centuries, though villication income played a minor role. By around 1300, leasing dominated. The monastery divested uneconomical holdings, such as vineyard shares near Remagen, likely due to high transport costs. In 1245, it received 5,000 to 6,000 liters of wine annually, consuming a portion and selling the rest. A 1280 inventory lists properties and revenues in the parishes of Enkhausen, Hüsten, Menden, Balve, Schönholthausen, and Voßwinkel, the town and district of Werl, the Körbecke court, and the city and environs of Soest, extending along the Westphalian Hellweg to Altenrüthen and eastward to Horn and Mellrich. The monastery managed its holdings through advocacies, including one at the Kirchlinde main estate (noted in 1223) and others in Dreisborn and Sümmern. Urban advocacies existed in Werl and Soest, possibly Menden. Later, agents collecting dues were termed “receptors,” operating in Werl, Neheim, Menden, Soest, and Oestereiden at the monastery’s dissolution in 1804. Alongside tithes and other rights, Oelinghausen owned 130 peasant estates.

=== Manorial Economy ===
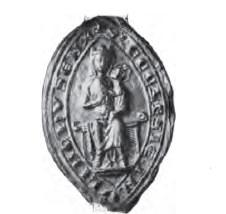
Seal of Kloster Oelinghausen, 1284, now in the Landesarchiv Nordrhein-Westfalen Abteilung Westfalen. Inscription: S. ecclesie in ulinchusen

The monastery acquired all surrounding estates, forming a substantial manorial economy initially organized via a grange or curia system. From the monastery estate, tenant farms in Stiepel, Mimberge, and Holzen were managed. Beyond agriculture and forestry, conversi operated workshops as weavers, furriers, shoemakers, builders, and smiths. By the 14th century, declining conversi numbers led to the abandonment of the grange system, with all properties except the monastery estate leased. By the 18th century, the economy included 650 Morgen (over 160 hectares) of farmland, 3,000 Morgen of forest, and thirty lay workers. Structures comprised the church, monastery buildings, a chapel, two priests’ residences, servants’ quarters, a brewery, bakery, stables, garden shed, barn, grain and sawmill, ash and brick kilns, a barn and granary in Oestereiden, a receptor house in Soest, and chapels in Hachen and Kirchlinde.

At dissolution, the manorial economy included 17 Morgen of vegetable and fruit gardens and 11 Morgen of fishponds. The monastery maintained 24 fishponds, primarily for carp, and fished local streams and rivers. High internal demand led to significant purchases of herring and stockfish in the early 17th century, with much of the catch sold. Alongside grains and crops, hops were cultivated. The monastery owned 97 cattle, 78 pigs, and 260 sheep, though a large goat herd was relinquished in 1726 by electoral decree. To boost yields, Oelinghausen employed charcoal burners and established a brick kiln and distillery.

Mills were among the earliest commercial operations. A mill likely existed at the monastery’s founding, with a donation by Gottfried II. in Werl documented in 1203. A mill was built at Bieberbach, initially run by conversi, and leased from the mid-15th century. The monastery operated grain, saw, and oil mills.

Recent evidence confirms medieval and early modern mining and smelting activities, indicated by pinges, prospecting sites, and an archaeologically verified smelting furnace from the 13th to 15th centuries, supported by nearby ceramic finds.

Post-Soester Fehde, the monastery acquired a Soest estate from the St. Walburgis Foundation. The stone house, with its chapel, served as an administrative hub for Soest-area properties and facilitated market access for purchasing and selling goods, acting as a warehouse. Annual revenues exceeded 18,000 thalers, with 16,000 thalers in active capital, making Oelinghausen the wealthiest women’s monastery in the Duchy of Westphalia.

=== Convent ===
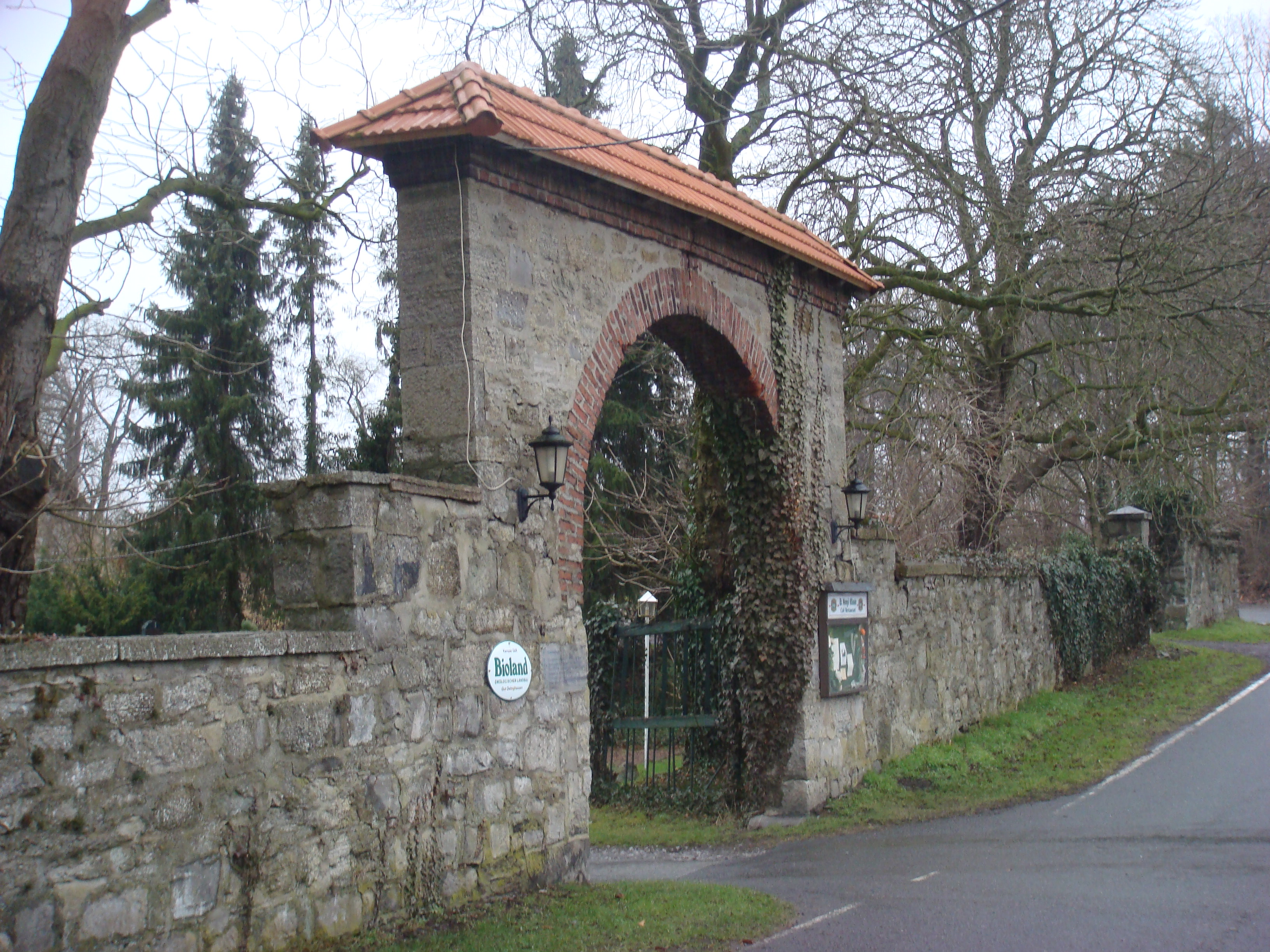
Entrance to the economic courtyard

The Oelinghausen convent was deemed more prestigious than Rumbeck’s, attracting nuns from prominent noble families in its early centuries, including Engelbert von Berg’s sister and Irmgard von Arnsberg, sister of Gottfried III. Until the 14th century, many Arnsberg countesses joined, alongside members of noble houses like Tecklenburg, Waldeck, Dassel, Lippe, and Limburg.

With the Arnsberg dynasty’s end in the 14th century, Oelinghausen’s prestige waned. High nobility was replaced by lower noble families such as Plettenberg, Böckenförde genannt Schüngel, Fürstenberg, Vogt von Elspe, Hanxleden, Schade, and Wrede, plus Soest patricians. Admissions remained high into the early 16th century; in 1517, order visitators noted Oelinghausen had accepted so many novices that its revenues could barely support them.

In its final three centuries, the community included non-noble lay sisters for physical tasks and male conversi, managed by a cellarer, handling property administration and heavy labor. From the 16th century, prebendaries, often from peasant families, performed artisanal work.

A hallmark of Premonstratensian women’s monasteries was the provost’s central role, stemming from its double monastery origins, overseeing spiritual and property matters. Major transactions required convent approval. Provosts were typically noble Premonstratensians from monasteries like Scheda or Cappenberg, never Wedinghausen after its 15th-century shift to non-noble canons.

The prioress, managing internal affairs, was elected by the nuns under the provost’s oversight and later confirmed by the Wedinghausen abbot. Initially living with the sisters, she later had private quarters. The subprioress mediated between convent and prioress. Other roles included subprioress, cellarer, sacristan, and wardrobe mistress. The convent numbered around 60 nuns in the 13th and 14th centuries, peaking at 80 in the early 16th century, dropping to 40 by mid-century and 30 in the 17th century.

By the late early modern period, convent life transformed. In the 18th century, Oelinghausen housed 34 religious: two-thirds nuns, one-third lay sisters. Noble nuns were largely replaced, except for some salt merchant families, by women from affluent bourgeois or peasant families from the Duchy of Westphalia, Electorate of Cologne, and the Prince-Bishoprics of Paderborn, Münster, and Mainz. Lay sisters came solely from local peasant families.

=== Archive and Library ===
After the 1804 dissolution, the monastery’s archive was transferred to Arnsberg’s archive depot, heavily used to resolve disputed property and legal issues. Later, documents moved to the Münster Provincial Archive (now Landesarchiv Nordrhein-Westfalen Abteilung Westfalen). Archivist Peter von Hatzfeldt compiled an initial inventory from 1850 to 1860. Historian Manfred Wolf describes Oelinghausen’s document collection as “exceptionally rich” compared to other, often scattered, Sauerland monastery archives.

The archive includes a necrology with over 3,000 entries, detailing the monastery’s networks and personal connections. The extant 18th-century copy incorporates earlier records, dating back to the monastery’s founding. It lists nuns, lay sisters, provosts, founders, benefactors, Wedinghausen members, and nuns’ relatives. Former nuns in Arnsberg continued the necrology into the 1830s.

The library holdings of women’s monasteries and foundations in the Duchy of Westphalia are poorly documented. Oelinghausen and Rumbeck likely never had significant collections. In 1641, during the re-transformation from a canoness foundation to a monastery, canonesses burned books, primarily breviaries and liturgical texts.

== Buildings and Furnishings ==
=== Church Architecture ===
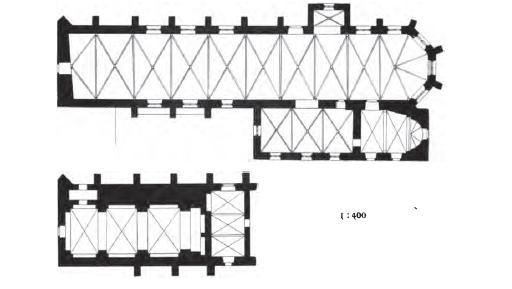
Ground plan of the monastery church (top: church with northern Marienkapelle, southern Kreuzkapelle, and sacristy; bottom: crypt and vestibule)

The construction history of the monastery church remains partially unclear due to limited written records. Archaeological excavations uncovered remnants beneath the church, likely from a residential or economic building associated with the founding family. In 1907, A. Dünnebacke proposed that the current sacristy was the original church, a view later supported by Wilfried Michel in the Westphalian Monastery Book, but this theory has since been disproven.

A Romanesque predecessor to the current Gothic church existed, narrower and shorter than the present nave. A surviving capital from this structure now serves as the base for the Easter candelabrum. Dating to around 1200, a Romanesque crypt beneath the nuns’ gallery is single-naved, three-bayed, and features cross-ribbed vaulting. Since the 1960s, the crypt has functioned as a chapel of grace, housing the Kölsche Madonna. A vestibule adjoins the crypt, opening to the nave through three pointed arches, dated to the first half of the 14th century. The sacristy, constructed in three phases, includes early Gothic sections, with renovations in the late 14th century during the church’s reconstruction and further Baroque modifications.

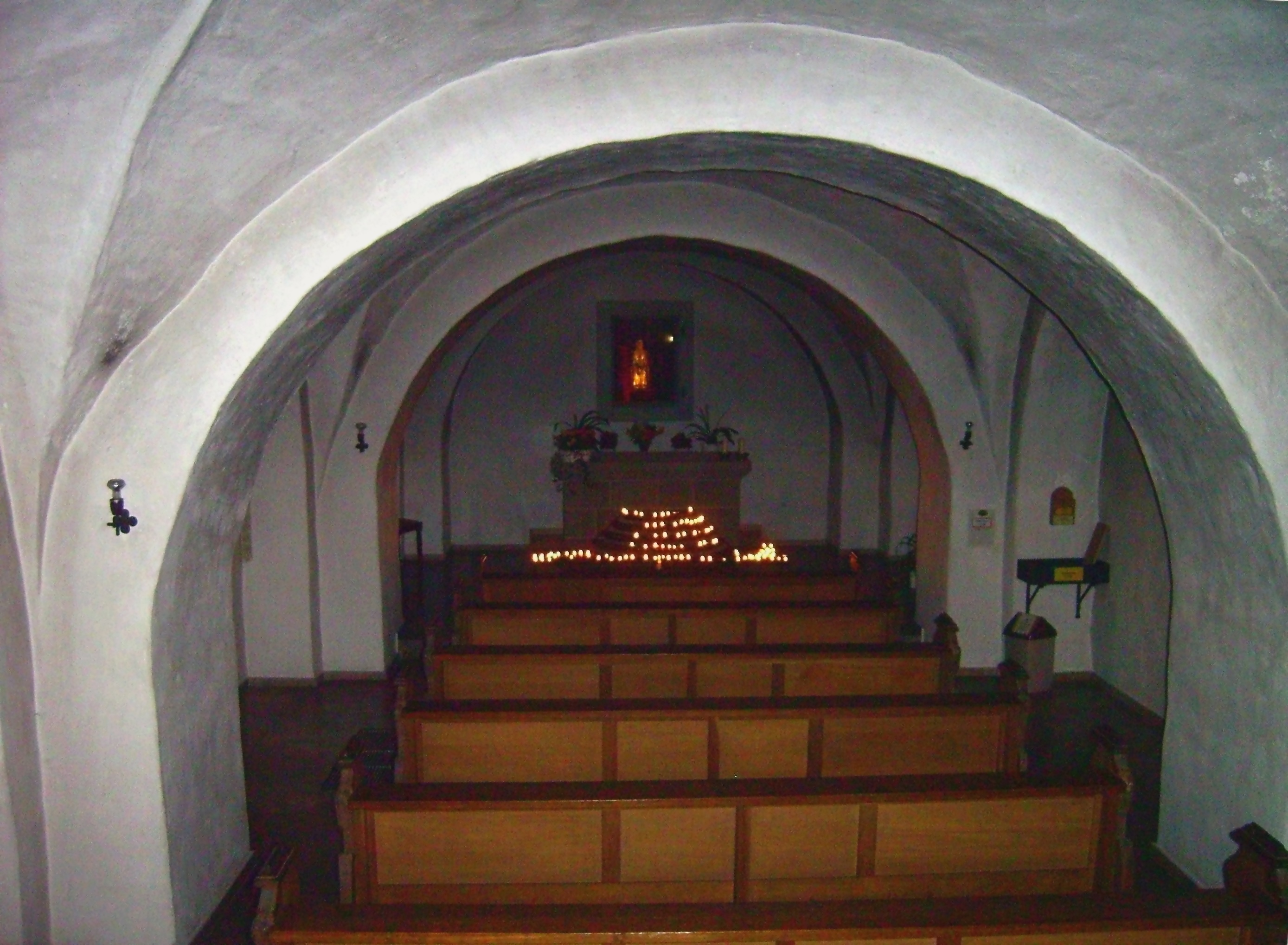
Romanesque crypt

The current Gothic church, built in the 14th century, is a single-nave, nine-bay hall with a 5/8 choir. The nave was constructed in three phases, with the choir and nave uniformly vaulted with cross-ribs and keystone accents.

From the fourth bay, an elevated nuns’ gallery, accessible by two staircases, spans roughly half the church. Two southern chapels include the three-bay Kreuzkapelle and the two-bay sacristy with a wall apse. A former northern entrance, now walled, serves as a small Marienkapelle. The church’s windows are pointed, two-part with tracery, except for single-part windows in the sacristy. Covered with a slate roof, the south side extends seamlessly over the sacristy and Kreuzkapelle. A small bell tower was added in the 16th century.

=== Furnishings ===
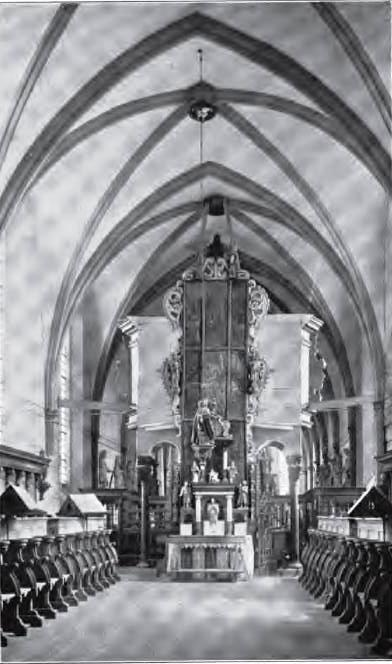
Nuns’ gallery in 1906, showing the choir stalls and Johannes altar, with the organ’s rear wall visible. The Baroque double Madonna, now in the vault, is absent.

Restoration work from 1957 to 1960 revealed Gothic wall and ceiling paintings from the late 15th century. Older white-gray surfaces with painted red quadring and vine ornaments around the keystone remain, alongside plant-like vault decorations, two angels, and other elements from 1499. A large depiction of Saint Christopher, rediscovered in 1933, dates to the early 16th century.

The church’s Baroque transformation spanned several periods, beginning under abbesses Ottilia and Anna von Fürstenberg during the canoness foundation. Later phases were driven by provosts, notably Christian Biegeleben (1656–1678) and Theodor Sauter (1704–1732). Sculptor Wilhelm Spliethoven from Volbringen created an extensive ensemble, including the high altar, life-sized apostle figures, and organ casing. Oelinghausen uniquely preserves Spliethoven’s complete work, including illuminations by Alexander La Ruell from Münster.

The Marian statue in the crypt, known as the “Dear Lady of Cologne,” “Queen of the Sauerland,” or “Kölsche Madonna,” dates to the early 13th century. The seated Virgin, clad in a long robe, faces forward, with the Christ Child, added in the Middle Ages, holding a book and raising a blessing hand. The 57 cm statue, including the throne, had its hands, Child, and crown replaced, with a 1976 color scheme based on recent art-historical studies. A comparable, slightly later statue exists in the Merklinghauser Kapelle.

The 10-meter Baroque high altar, created by Spliethoven in 1712, possibly based on Sauter’s Italian-inspired designs, features numerous statues, with paintings by La Ruell. The twelve apostle figures in the nave are also by Spliethoven and La Ruell.

The Kreuzkapelle contains gravestones of former provosts and a dominant epitaph for Ottilia von Fürstenberg, now used as an altar top, likely crafted by Gerhard Gröninger or an Italian artist. A late Gothic Woman of the Apocalypse from around 1530 adorns the chapel’s vault.

The Marienkapelle houses a Gothic panel painting of the Adoration of the Shepherds and a Baroque painting depicting the murder of Archbishop Engelbert I of Cologne. Monastery tradition, though historically inaccurate, claims Engelbert spent the night before his death at Oelinghausen.

The nuns’ gallery features choir stalls with 46 seats, the back rows from the 18th century and the front rows reusing late Gothic cheeks from around 1380. A 12th-century triumphal cross stands on the gallery, and a two-meter Baroque double Madonna from around 1730 hangs in the vault. The organ’s rear wall conceals a large Johannes altar, flanked by late Gothic apostle figures, possibly from a lost carved altar, with some attributed to Gertrud Gröninger. Sculptures on the choir benches date from the 14th to 17th centuries.

The church’s ridge turret holds a three-bell peal of cast steel bells from 1921, hung in a wooden belfry from the church’s construction period, ringing in the sequence E♭–G♭–A♭.

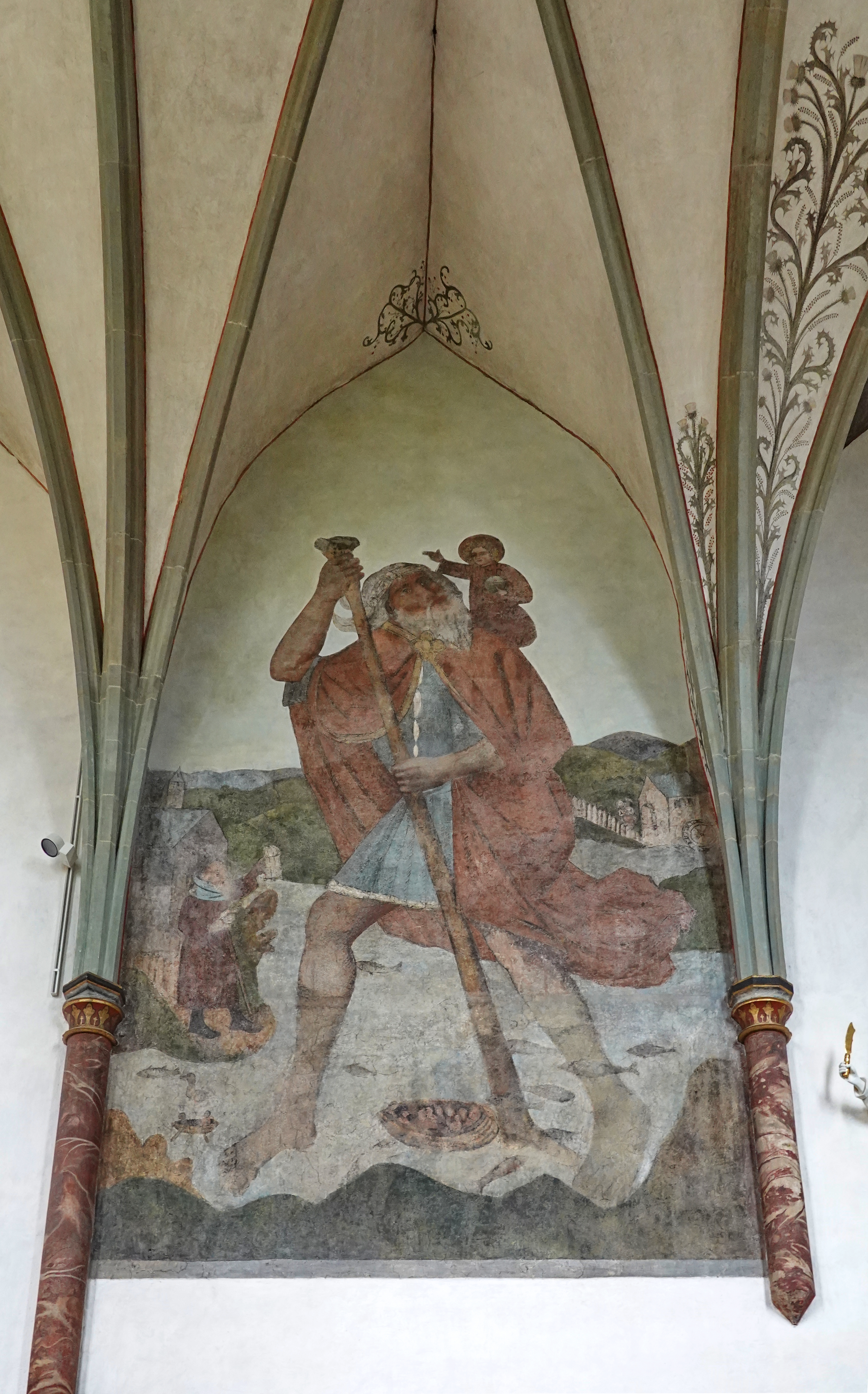
Saint Christopher mural in the nave

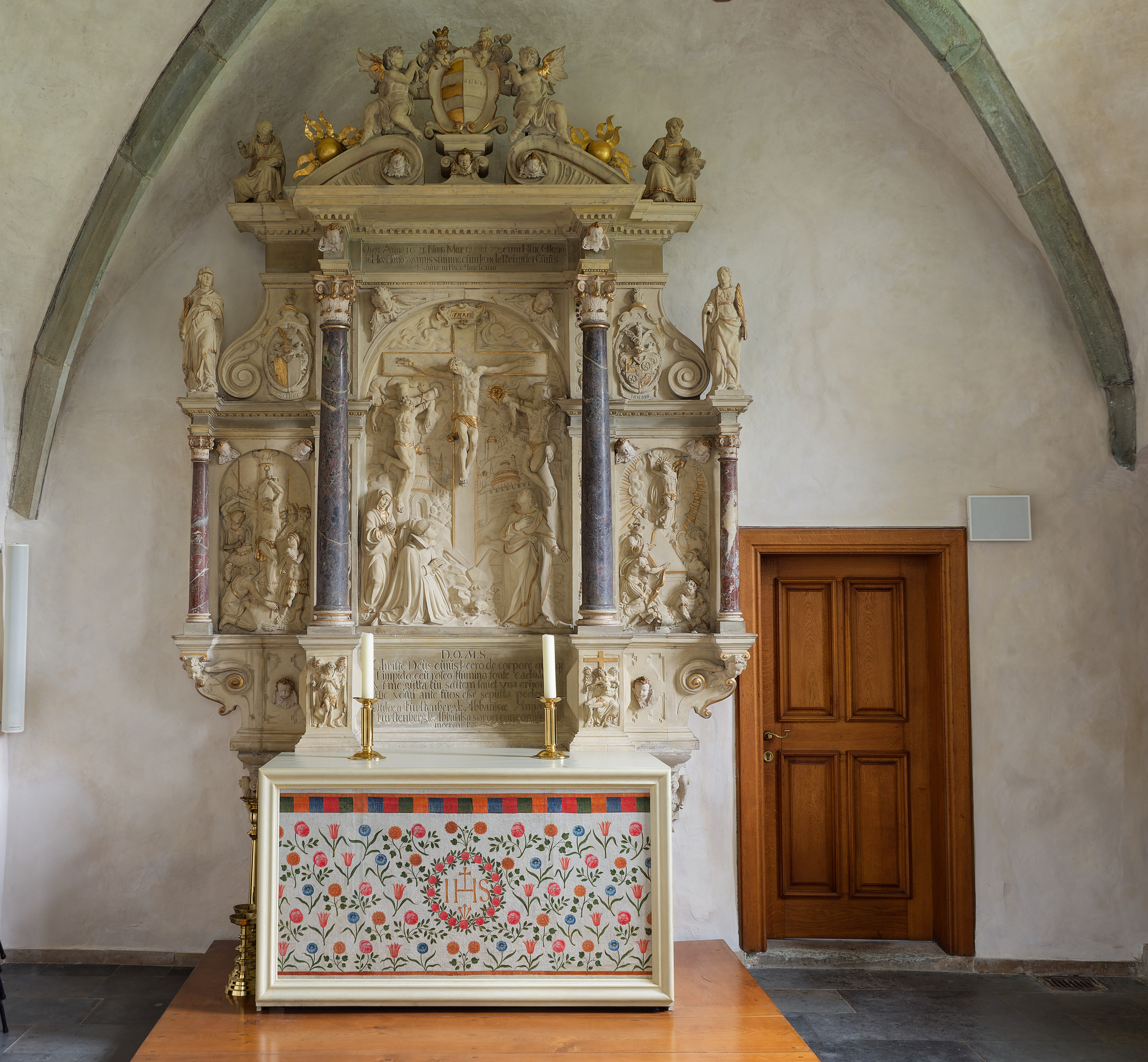
Epitaph for Ottilia von Fürstenberg in the Kreuzkapelle

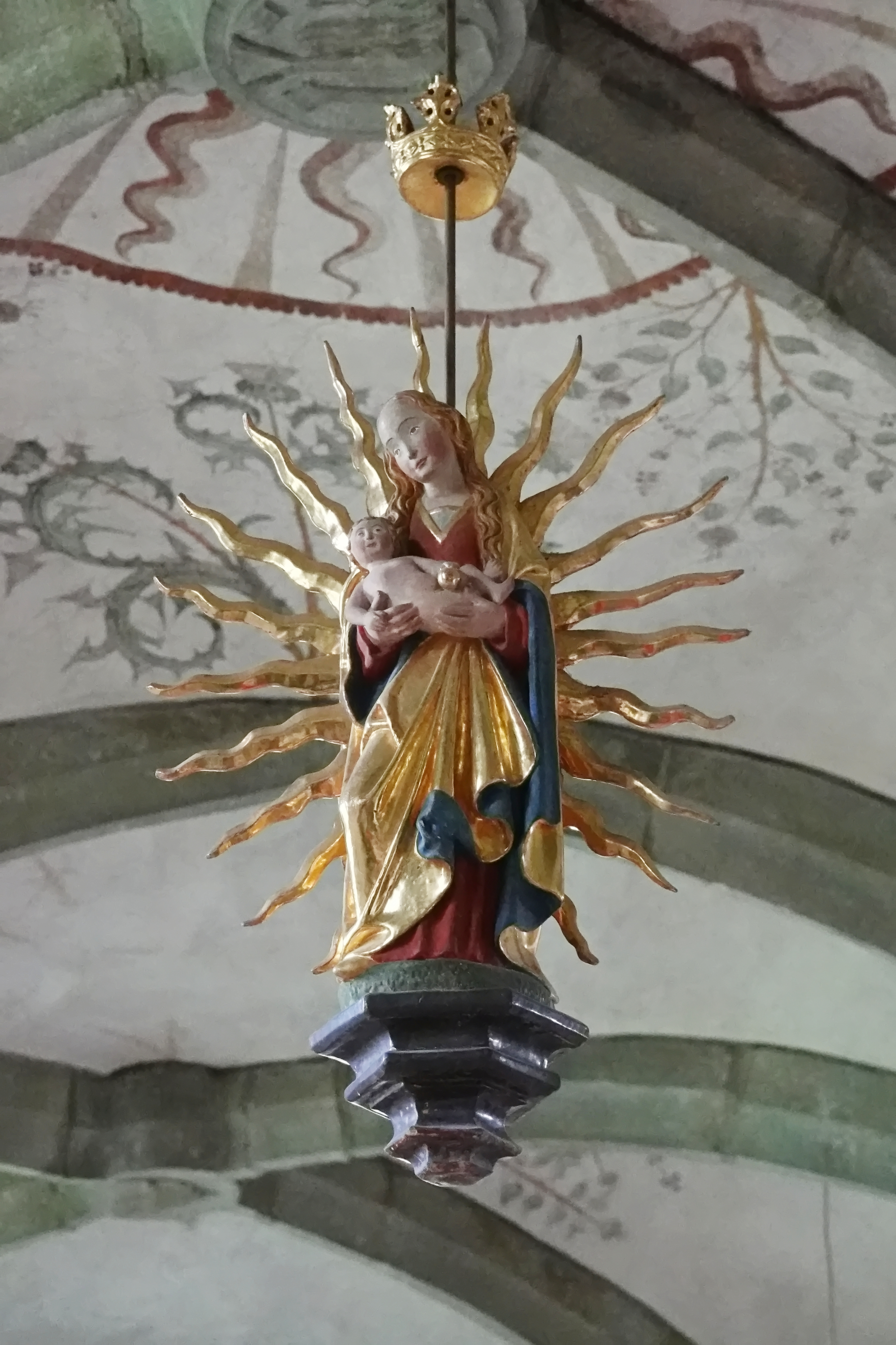
Late Gothic double Madonna in the Kreuzkapelle

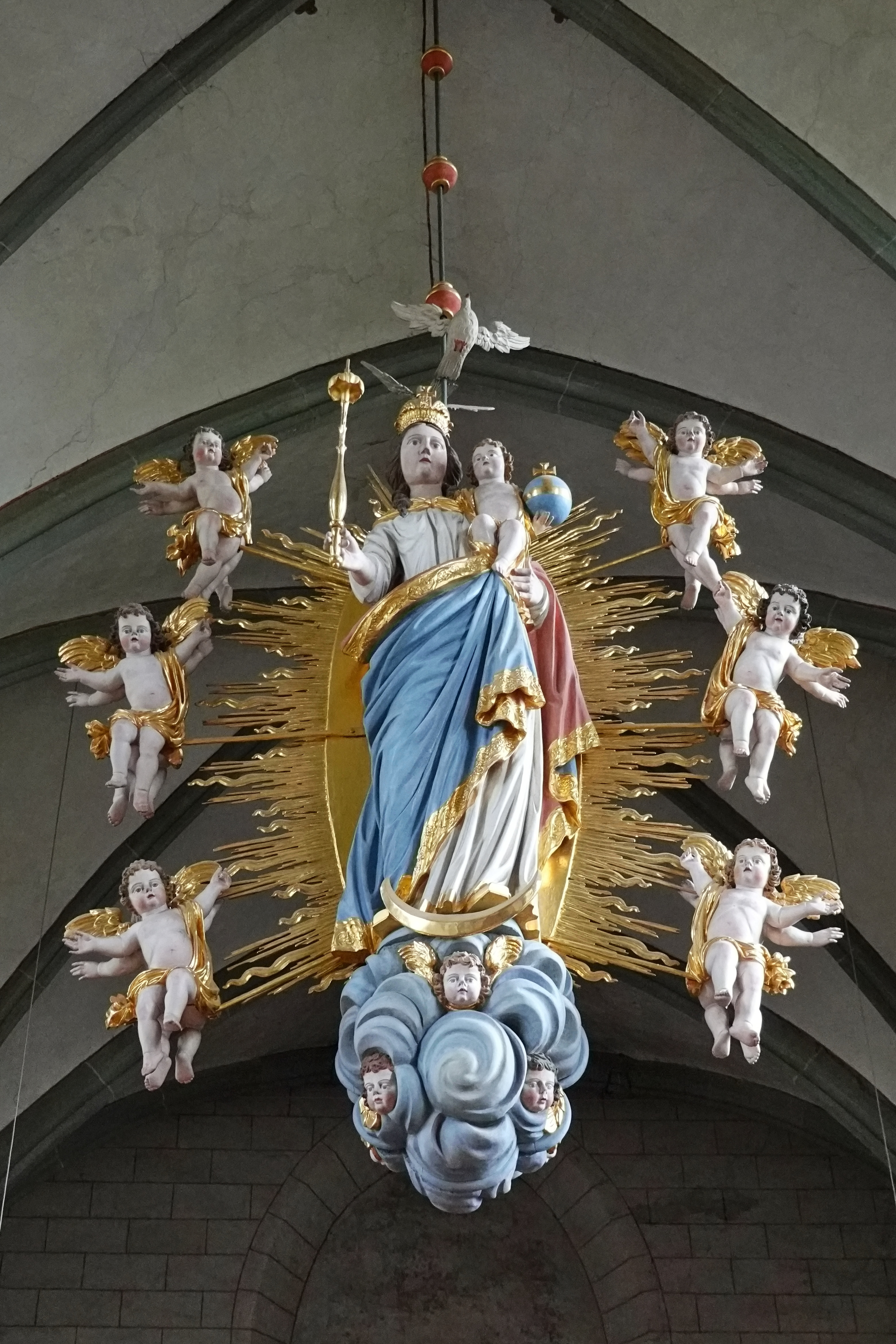
Baroque radiant Madonna from the Sasse workshop on the nuns’ gallery

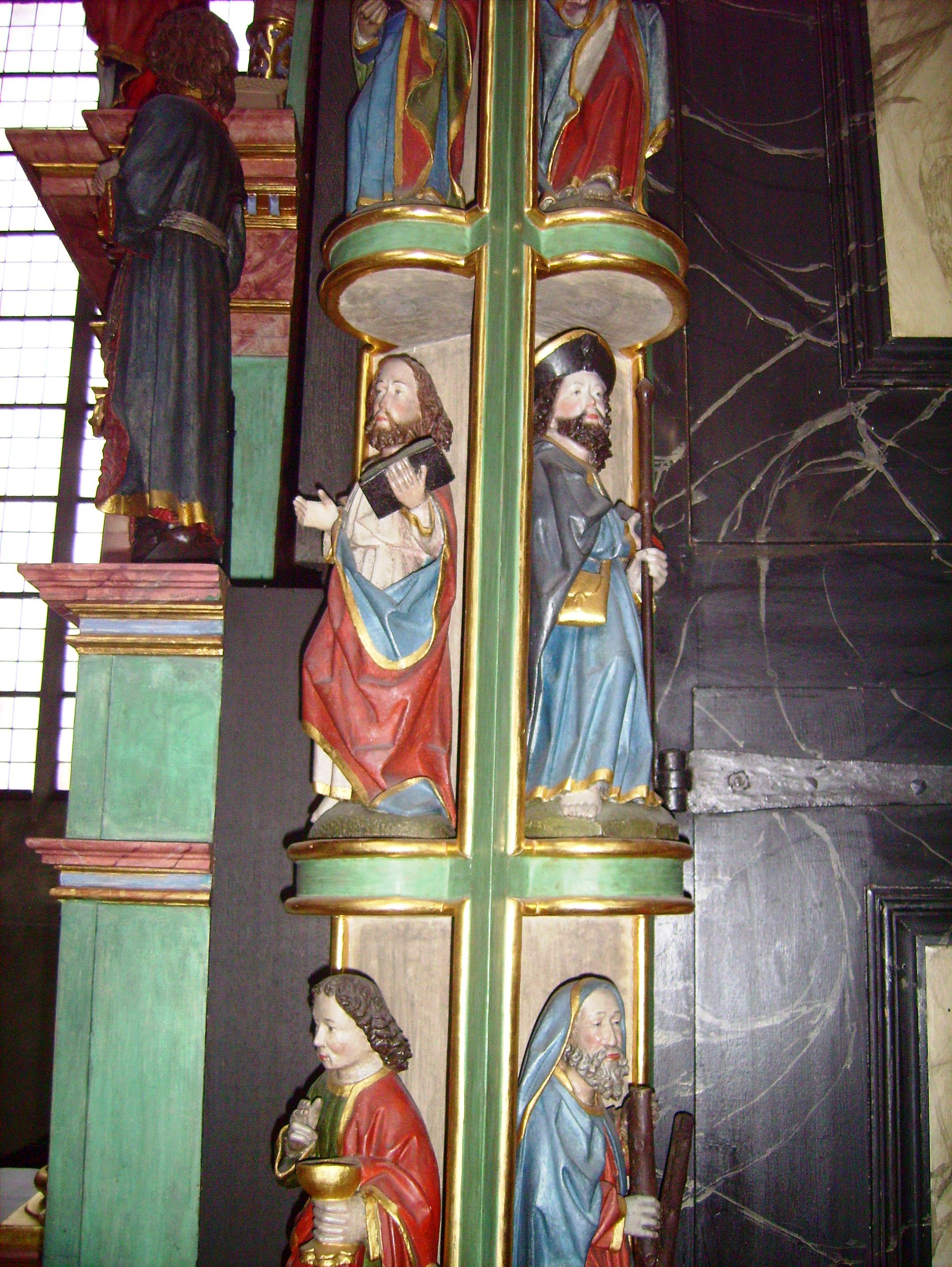
Late Gothic apostle figures at the Johannes altar

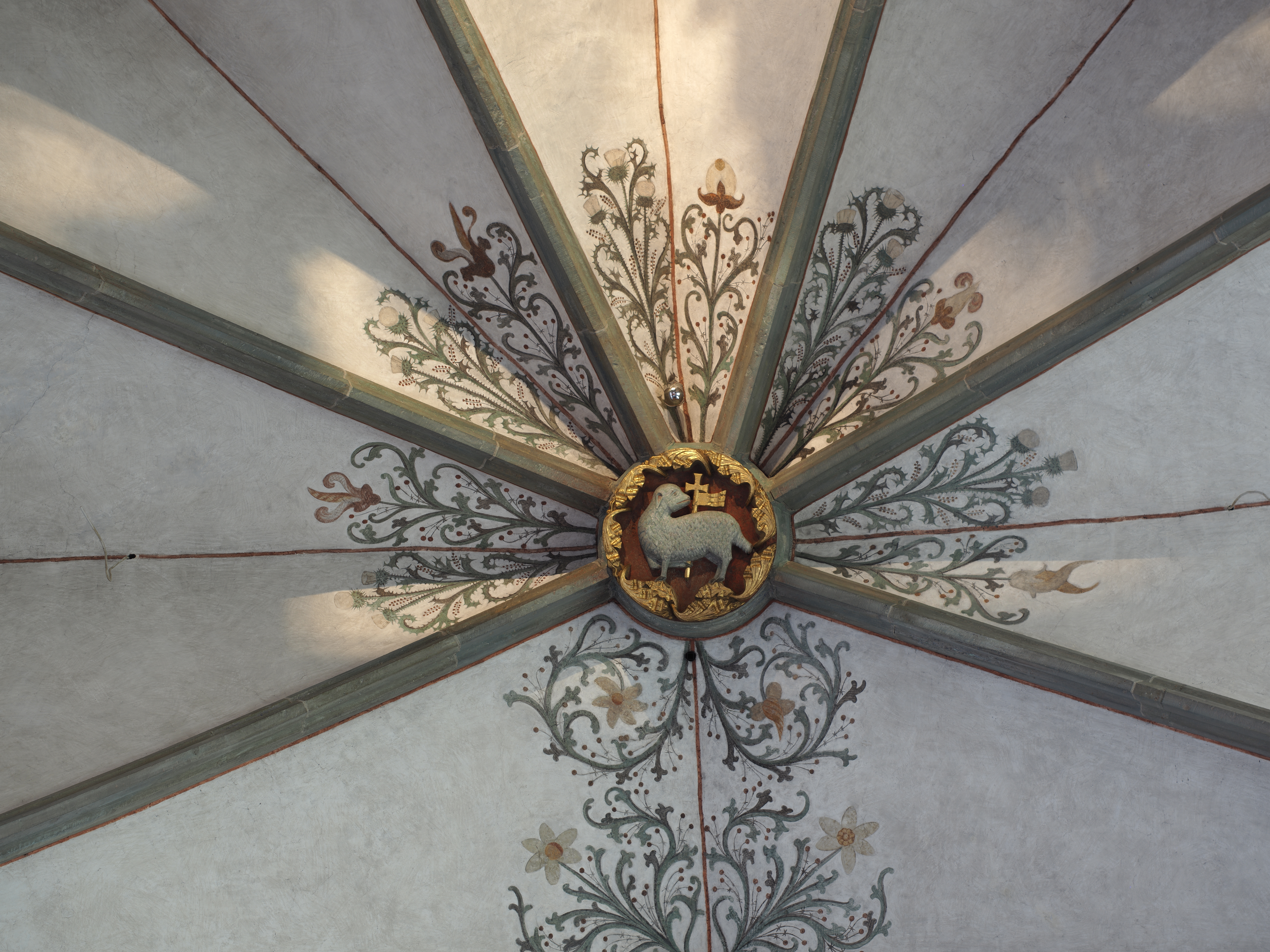
Keystone in the choir vault above the altar

=== Organ ===
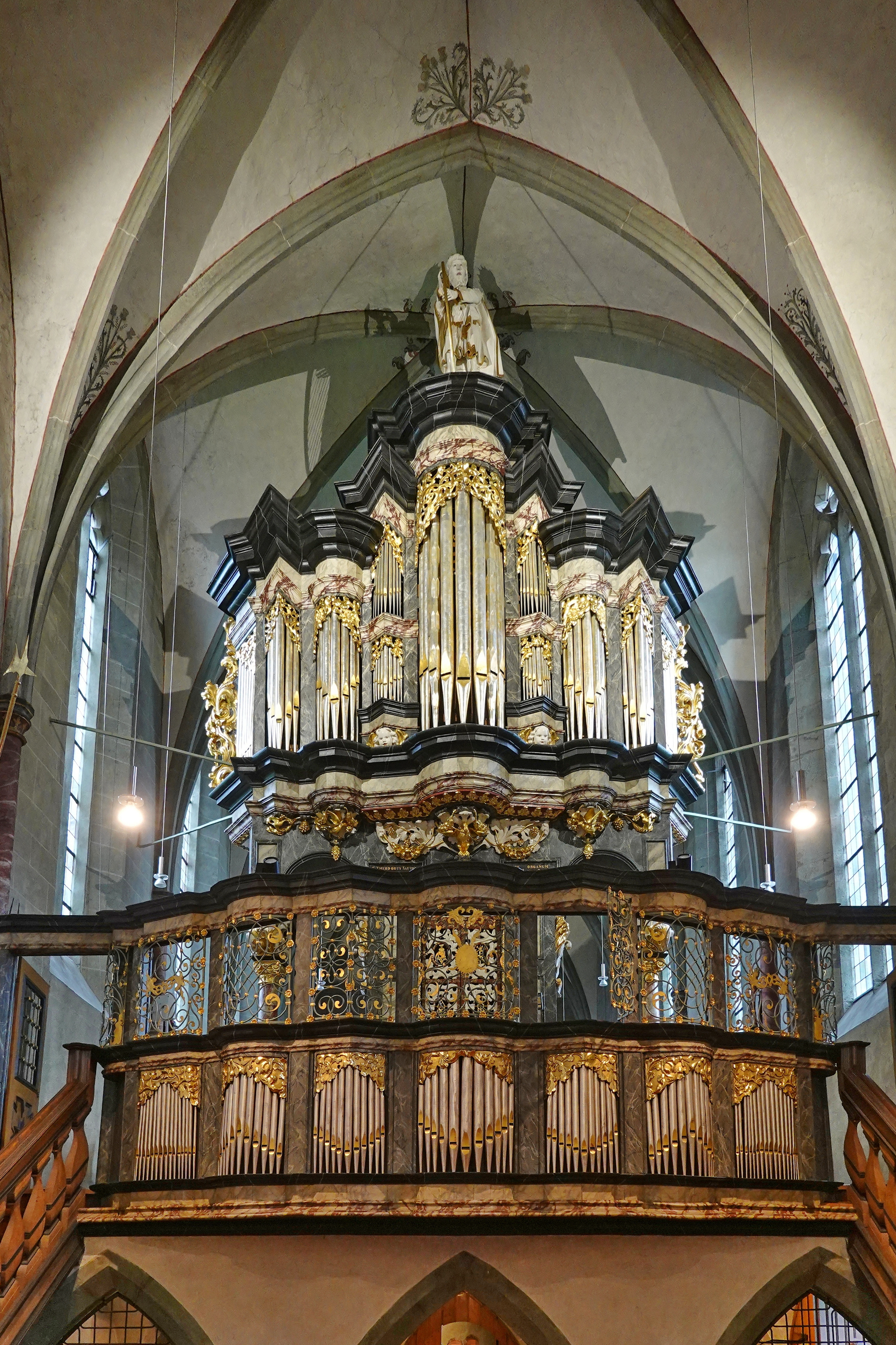
Baroque organ, renovated by Johann Berenhard Klausing, with prospect by Wilhelm Spliethoven

An organ, likely a swallow’s nest type, was first mentioned in a memorial foundation by Dean Wilhelm Freseken. Contrary to some claims, the source does not confirm Freseken’s donation. The organ was expanded in 1499, possibly alongside a larger second organ. By 1585, a spring-chest organ with two manuals was recorded. On February 2, 1586, Dutch troops under Martin Schenk von Nideggen raided the monastery, destroying the organ. In 1599, Paderborn Prince-Bishop Theodor von Fürstenberg donated two new organs to his sister, Prioress Ottilia. Marten de Mare built the new organ in its current location, reusing undamaged material from the earlier instruments. Johann Berenhard Klausing from Herford began renovation and expansion in 1713, completing the work in 1717, with the organ casing crafted by Spliethoven and La Ruell.

The organ’s distinction lies in the preservation of most pipes from 1599 and 1717, with the 1599 pipes being rare in Germany and neighboring regions. The rear wall’s panel paintings originate from de Mare’s original wing doors. From 2000 to 2002, the Swiss firm Orgelbau Kuhn restored and reconstructed the instrument, with support from the Freundeskreis Oelinghausen e.V., aiming to restore its 1717 state.

The organ’s disposition is as follows:

I Hauptwerk CD–c^{3}
Bardun	16′	M
Praestant	8′	M
Rohrflaute	8′	K
Octava	4′	A^{(Note: Circa 1555.)}
Flaute Duse	4′	K
Spitzflaute	2′	A
Sexquialtera III	2 2/3′	M/K
Mixtur IV	2′	M
Cimbal III	1 1/3′	K
Trompett (Bass/Discant)	8′	R^{(Note: Heads and throats reconstructed by Hans Peter Mebold (1989).)}

II Brustwerk CD–c^{3}
Gedact	8′	K
Octava	4′	M
Duesflöt	4′	K
Octav	2′	A/R
Mixtur III	1′	A/R

Pedal CD–d^{1}
Subbass	16′	R
Octava	8′	R
Octav	4′	R
Posaun	16′	R

A = Unknown organ builder pre-1586
M = Marten de Mare (1599)
K = Johann Berenhard Klausing (1717)
R = Reconstruction by Orgelbau Kuhn (2002)

- Couplers: II/I (slide coupler); I/P.
- Tremulant for the entire organ
- Star

=== Other Buildings ===
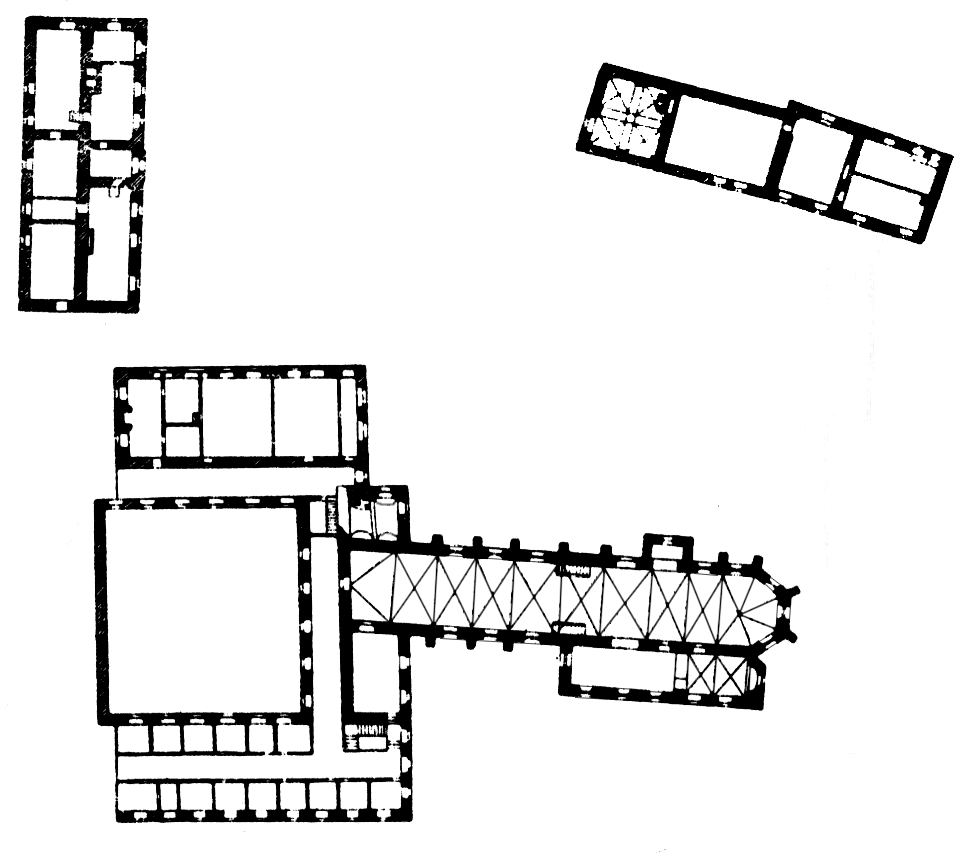
Ground plan and layout of the church and monastery buildings, likely at the time of dissolution

Few of the original monastery buildings survive. After dissolution, structures like the gatehouse were demolished. The 14th-century Michael’s Chapel at the entrance and the hospital are also gone.

The monastery building, originally attached to the church’s west side, had three wings, but only the eastern and southern wings remain. The northern wing was demolished after secularization. Built in the early 18th century, the structure rests on earlier foundations, with two cellar fireplaces preserved, one bearing Ottilia von Fürstenberg’s coat of arms and dates. A listed economic building, erected in the early 20th century at the former northern wing’s site, now houses the Klostergartenmuseum. A half-timbered house southwest of the church and convent, called the “Schäferhaus” by some, may have been a residence during the canoness foundation period. Adjacent to it, the former “Oberförsterscheune,” with 16th-century foundations, has been restored and serves as an occupational therapy practice for one of the resident canonesses. A 400-meter listed wall, once eight meters high with towers, encloses the monastery area, providing habitat for various plants and animals. The reconstructed monastery garden lies east of the church.

Although on former monastery land, the Oelinghausen estate, owned by the von Fürstenberg family, is no longer part of the monastery complex. Parts of the estate, including gate entrances and a steward’s house built in the Wilhelminian era with Jugendstil elements, are listed. A large 19th-century dovecote in the economic courtyard reflects the monastery’s historical economy.

== Notable figures ==
=== Prioresses and abbesses ===
- Alegunte, 1234
- Gysla, Countess of Altena, 1270
- Alheidis, Countess of Arnsberg, 1321
- Gertrudis, 1350
- Sophia, 1363
- Elzeke von Hattrope, 1383–1419
- Sophia von Hanxleden, 1429
- Cunegundis von Plettenberg gen. van der Molen, 1430
- Katharina von der Becke, 1452
- Margareta Vogedes, 1463
- Christina von Müllesborn, 1475
- Swenne des Quaden, 1488–1505
- Ida von Hersel, 1506
- Elisabeth von Dale, 1510
- Margarete Schüngel, 1517–1536
- Engela von Plettenberg, 1537
- Maria von Schüngel, 1548
- Hilberg Fridag, 1569–1585 (resigned)
- Ottilia von Fürstenberg, 1585–1621 (Abbess)
- Anna von Fürstenberg, 1621–1626 (Abbess)
- Elisabeth von Eickel, 1626–1634
- Helena von Plettenberg, 1634 (Abbess)
- Anna von Plettenberg, 1637–1641 (Abbess)
- Anna Christine von Böckenförde, 1642 (Abbess)
- Elisabeth Rham, 1642–1650
- Judith Brandis, 1651–1667
- Elisabeth Brandis, 1667–1679
- Theodora Catharina Schüngel, 1683–1697
- Clara Christina Greving, 1711
- Maria Theresia Schmitmann, 1728
- Maria Katharina von Greving, 1742–1770
- Maria Dorothea Wulf, 1770–1789
- Maria Catharina Diez, 1789–1804

=== Provosts ===
- Radolf (Prior until 1225), 1210–1238
- Dietrich, 1241
- Adam, 1242–1246
- Gottfried, 1256–1275
- Ludolf, 1279–1298
- Johann, until 1305
- Dietrich von Herrgottinchusen, from 1305
- Gerwin, 1308–1318
- Rutger Moylike, 1318–1347
- Gerhard von Ramsbeck, 1348–1356
- Gerhard von Warrendorf, 1357–1367
- Bernhard von der Horst, 1367–1385
- Johann von Mengede, 1386–1396
- Gottfried von Plettenberg, 1398–1410
- Arnt Wulf, 1410–1416
- Bernd Schmeling, 1417–1424
- Heidenreich Jomme, 1425–1441
- Hermann Rost, 1442–1451
- Heidenreich von Plettenberg, 1452–1459
- Johann Vridag, 1463–1483
- Heinrich von Rhemen, 1483–1505
- Dietrich Hüls, 1506–1511
- Ludolf Werminghausen, 1513–1516
- Heinrich von Schorlemer, 1518–1528
- Hermann von Neuhof, 1529–1531
- Gottfried von Ulfte, 1533–1539
- Vacant
- Johann Sundag, 1552–1561
- Heinrich von Werne, 1563–1565
- Kaspar von Schorlemer, 1565–1572
- Vacant
- Andreas von Varssem, 1577–1581
- Vacant
- Lambert Topp, 1642–1650
- Engelbert Carthaus, 1651–1654
- Christian Biegeleben, 1655–1678
- Nikolaus Engel, 1678–1697
- Wilhelm Schmidtmann, 1697–1704
- Theodor Sauter, 1704–1732
- Bernhard Heldt, 1732–1736
- Friedrich Hense, 1737–1740
- Maximilian Schlankert, 1740–1741
- Johann Rinnhoff, 1741–1768
- Stephan Mense, 1768–1780
- Augustin Schelle, 1780–1789
- Not reoccupied

== Bibliography ==
- Wolf, Manfred (1992). Die Urkunden des Klosters Oelinghausen. Fredeburg: Regesten.
- Saure, Werner (2005). Kloster Oelinghausen. Arnsberg: Kirchenführer.
- Die Baudenkmäler der Stadt Arnsberg. Erfassungszeitraum 1980–1990. Arnsberg 1990, pp. 187–197.
- Franz Fischer: Zur Wirtschaftsgeschichte des Prämonstratenserinnenklosters Ölinghausen. Arnsberg 1912.
- Friedrich Jakob: Die Orgel der Kloster- und Pfarrkirche St. Petri zu Oelinghausen. Arnsberg 2006, ISBN 978-3-930264-59-9.
- Stephanie Keinert: Die Bedeutung von Monitoring-Verfahren in der präventiven Konservierung – erläutert am Beispiel der barocken Ausstattung der Klosterkirche Oelinghausen. In: Denkmalpflege in Westfalen-Lippe 2018/1, ISSN 0947-8299, pp. 23–26.
- Magdalena Padberg (ed.): Kloster Oelinghausen. Strobel, Arnsberg 1986, ISBN 3-87793-018-2.
- Harald Polenz, Wilfried Michel: Kloster Oelinghausen und die historischen Orgeln. Iserlohn 1989, ISBN 3-922885-44-6.
- Helmut Richtering: Kloster Oelinghausen. In: Westfälische Zeitschrift. Vol. 123, Münster 1973, pp. 115–136.
- Werner Saure: Kloster Oelinghausen. Kirchenführer. Arnsberg 2005.
- Werner Saure (ed.): Oelinghauser Beiträge. Freundeskreis Oelinghausen e.V., Arnsberg 1999.
- Freundeskreis Oelinghausen e.V. (ed.): Barmherzigkeit, Armenfürsorge und Gesundheitspflege im Kloster Oelinghausen. Arnsberg, 2017.
