= Enkhausen =

- Ortschaft of Sundern
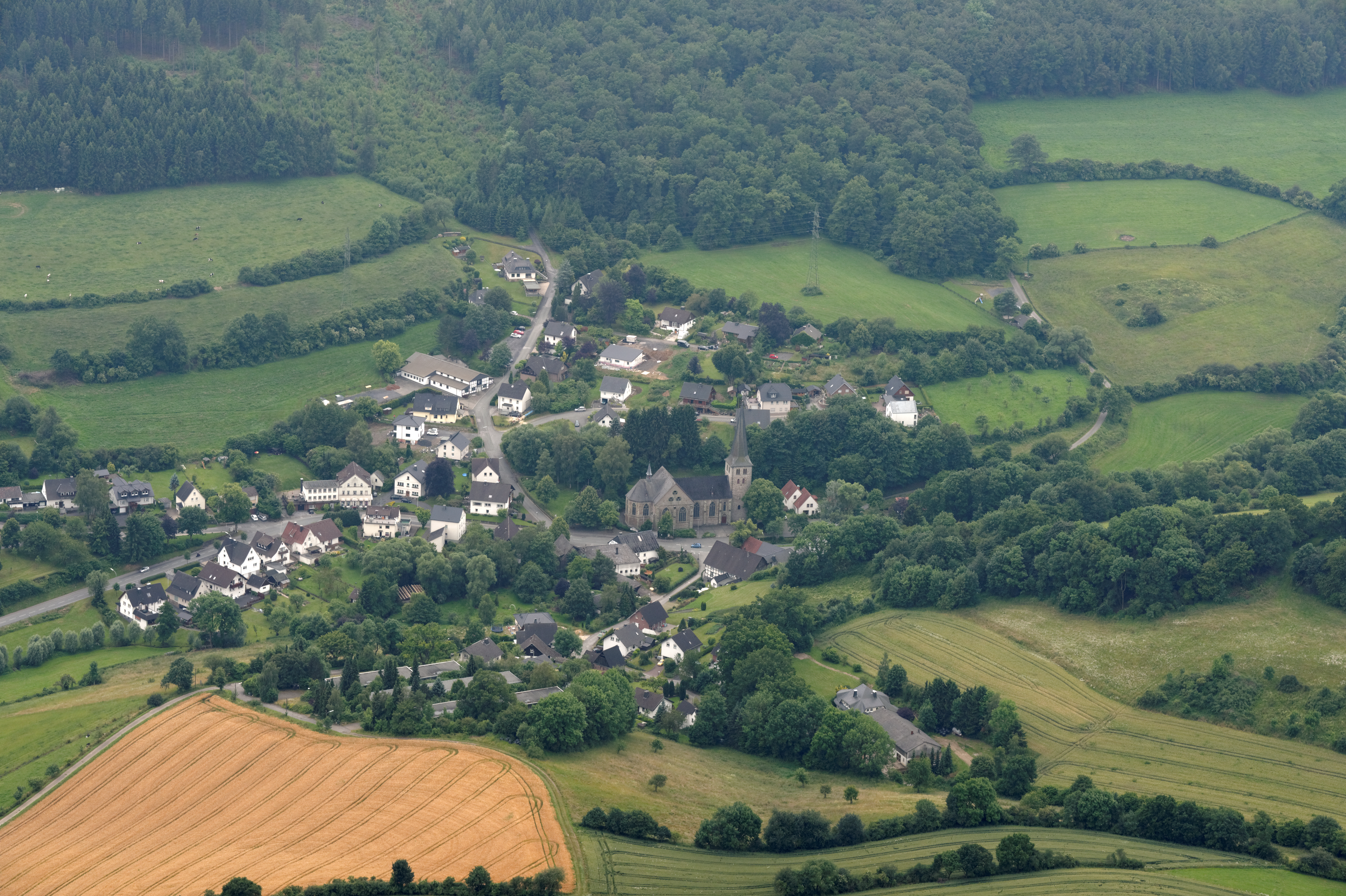
- Aerial view

- Coat of arms
- Interactive map of Enkhausen
- Location within Germany Location within North Rhine-Westphalia
- Coordinates: 51°22′20″N 07°57′40″E
- Country: Germany
- State: North Rhine-Westphalia
- Town: Sundern

Area
  - Total: 2.50 km^{2} (0.97 sq mi)
- Elevation: 240 m (790 ft)

Population
  - Total: 845
  - Density: 338/km^{2} (875/sq mi)
- Time zone: UTC+01:00 (CET)
  - Summer (DST): UTC+02:00 (CEST)
- Postal codes: 59846
- Dialling codes: 02935

Enkhausen is an Ortschaft of the town of Sundern in the Hochsauerlandkreis of Nordrhein-Westfalen, Germany.

== Geography ==
It borders Hachen in the east, Langscheid at the Sorpesee in the south and Estinghausen in the west. The village lies in the south of Sudern and is passed by the Bundesstraße 229.

== History ==
Enkhausen was first documented in the year 1173. On 1 January 1975, the village became part of the municipality of Sundern.

== Sights ==
- The neo-gothical church of St. Laurentius was opened in 1896.
- The Heinrich Lübke House is a museum dedicated to the career of the politician Heinrich Lübke.
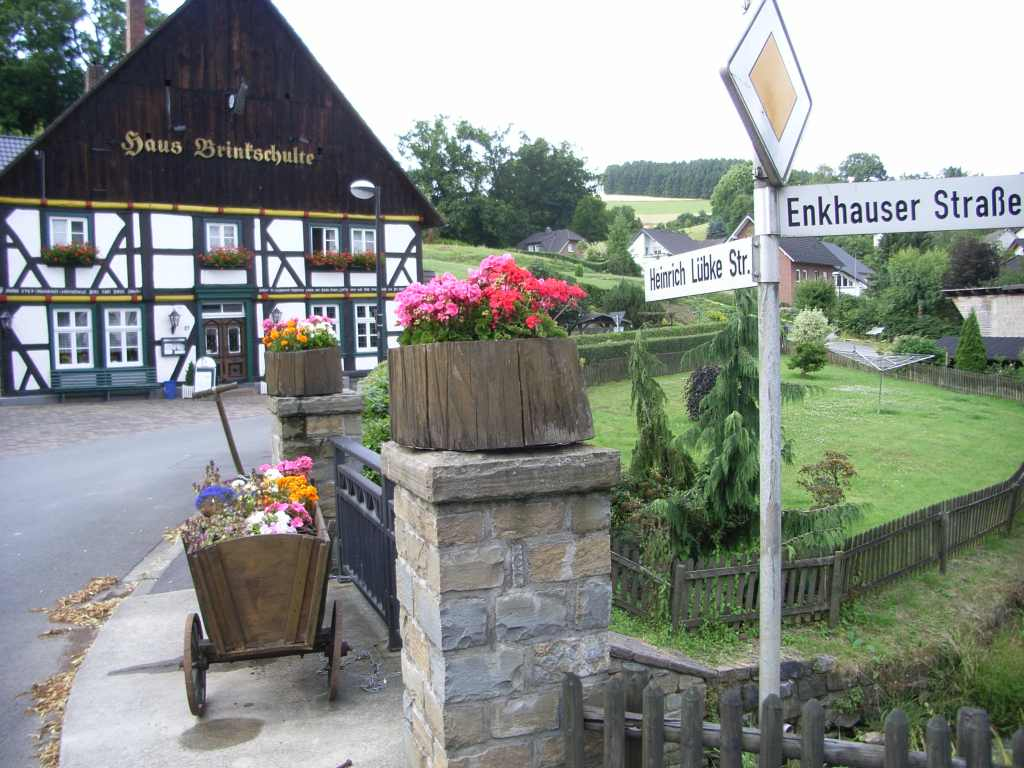
A street

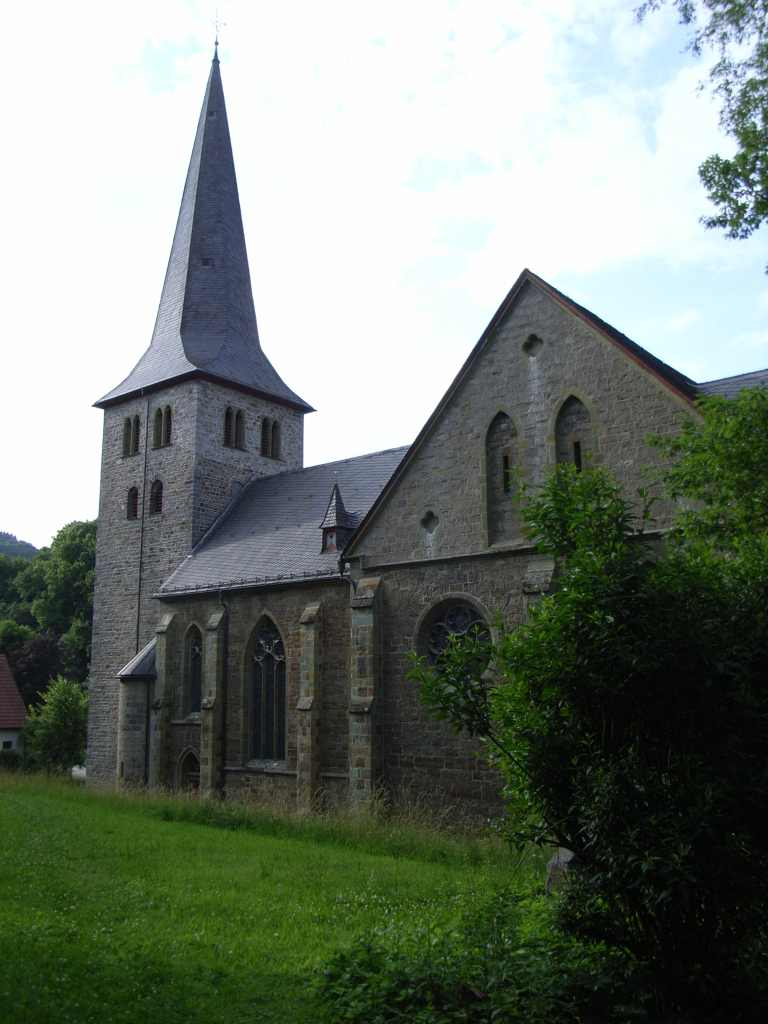
St. Laurentius

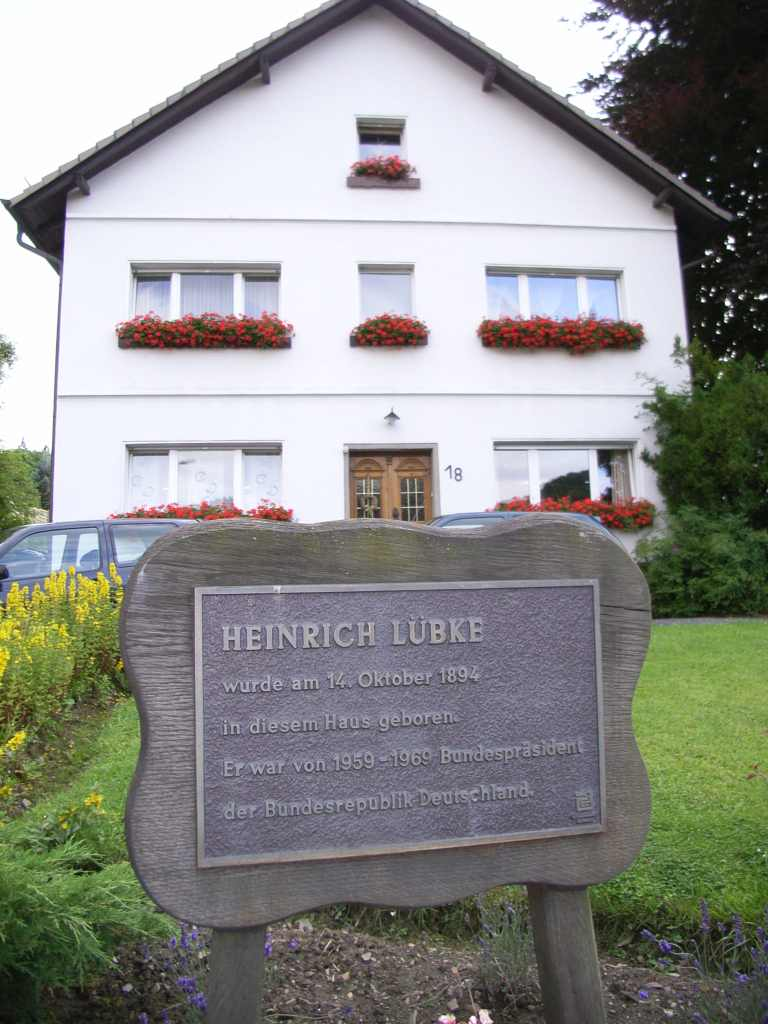
House in which Lübke was born

== Notable people ==
- Heinrich Lübke (1894–1972), Politician and President of West Germany. A street and a house were named in honour of him
- Friedrich Wilhelm Lübke (1887–1954), Politician and minister president of Schleswig-Holstein
- Roland Flach (born 1944), Manager

== Literature ==
- Theo Simon: Leben im Sauerland in früherer Zeit. Der Alltag der Menschen im früheren Kirchspiel Enkhausen. Zimmermann Druck + Verlag. Balve 1994.
