= Langscheid (Sundern) =

- Ortsteil of Sundern
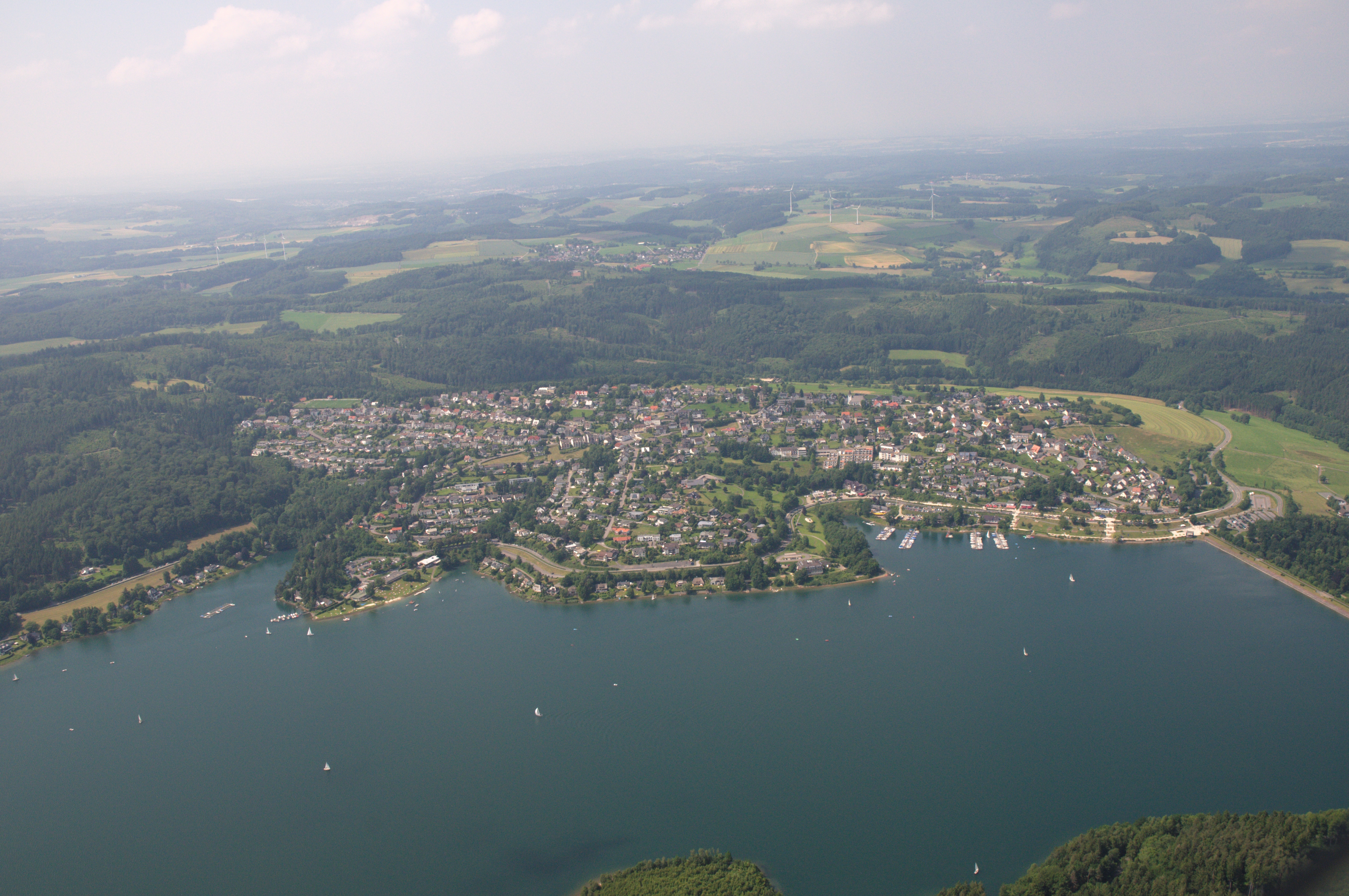
- Langscheid and Sorpe dam (right) seen from the east bank of the Sorpe reservoir

- Coat of arms
- Interactive map of Langscheid
- Location within Germany Location within North Rhine-Westphalia
- Coordinates: 51°21′16.10″N 7°57′26.08″E
- Country: Germany
- State: North Rhine-Westphalia
- District: Hochsauerlandkreis
- Town: Sundern
- Founded: 1307

Population
  - Total: 2,823
- Time zone: UTC+01:00 (CET)
  - Summer (DST): UTC+02:00 (CEST)
- Postal codes: 59846
- Dialling codes: +49 2935
- Vehicle registration: HSK

The hamlet of Langscheid is a part of the town of Sundern in the Sauerland in the district Hochsauerlandkreis in the federal state of North Rhine-Westphalia, Germany.

The climatic spa is situated on the hills to the West of the Sorpe reservoir's dam. Its earliest record dates back to the year 1307 AD.

== Sights ==
Langscheid's attractions include a war memorial with a look-out tower, as well as the earth embankment dam of the Sorpe reservoir.

== Education ==
Langscheid's children from age three to six may attend the Catholic Kindergarten, while youngsters from age six to ten are schooled at the local Catholic primary school.

Besides these education facilities, the Hochsauerlandkreis district runs the Bildungszentrum Sorpesee, an adult education center including hotel facilities.

== Religion ==
Many inhabitants of Langscheid are members of the Roman Catholic congregation. The earliest mention of a chapel in Langscheid dates back to 1637, when the parson from Enkhausen used to say Mass in it. Expanded in 1927, the 17th century chapel has a plastered, double bay hall and a roof covered in slate, carrying a small turret.

A surge in population, caused by the construction of the Sorpe dam starting in 1926, made it necessary to build a larger church in 1932/33 that now houses Langscheid's remarkable altar from the middle of the 18th century AD. Both the old chapel and the church were dedicated to patron saint Anthony the Anchorite. The chapel has since been renovated and converted into a parish hall in 1969.

Langscheid's Protestant congregation convenes in the modernist Markuskirche. Erected in 1965 in a style resembling Le Corbusier, it has the shape of an upside-down boat, with the triangular tip pointing toward the Sorpe reservoir.

== Medicine ==
The neurological clinic Dr. Evers in Langscheid specialises in the treatment of MS patients.

== Recreational facilities ==
The area surrounding the Sorpe reservoir has become a favourite local recreation area for the industrial centers of the Ruhr. Facilities include a small park (Kurpark) with the Haus des Gastes (tourist information center with indoor swimming pool and sauna), a lido (Strandbad) with boat rental, a campsite and the youth hostel on the lake shore.

== Sports and social life ==
The local football team Sus Langscheid/Enkhausen plays in the Verbandsliga and the first women's volleyball team of the Ruderclub Sorpesee plays in the Third Division.

Former Romanian football star Marcel Răducanu runs an outdoor training camp of his football school in Langscheid.

Further local clubs and associations include the local brigade of the volunteer fire department of Sundern, the Schützenverein St. Antonius Langscheid, the concert band Musikverein, the male choral society Westfalia and a women's choir.

== Coat of arms ==
Blason

Azure, two hauriant fish gold.

Further information

The coat of arms first appeared on a seal dating from 1652 AD and later in the coat of arms collection of Arnsberg of 1700 AD. It was officially authorized on October 26, 1911 with Enkhausen's patron saint St. Laurentius holding the shield.

== Image gallery ==
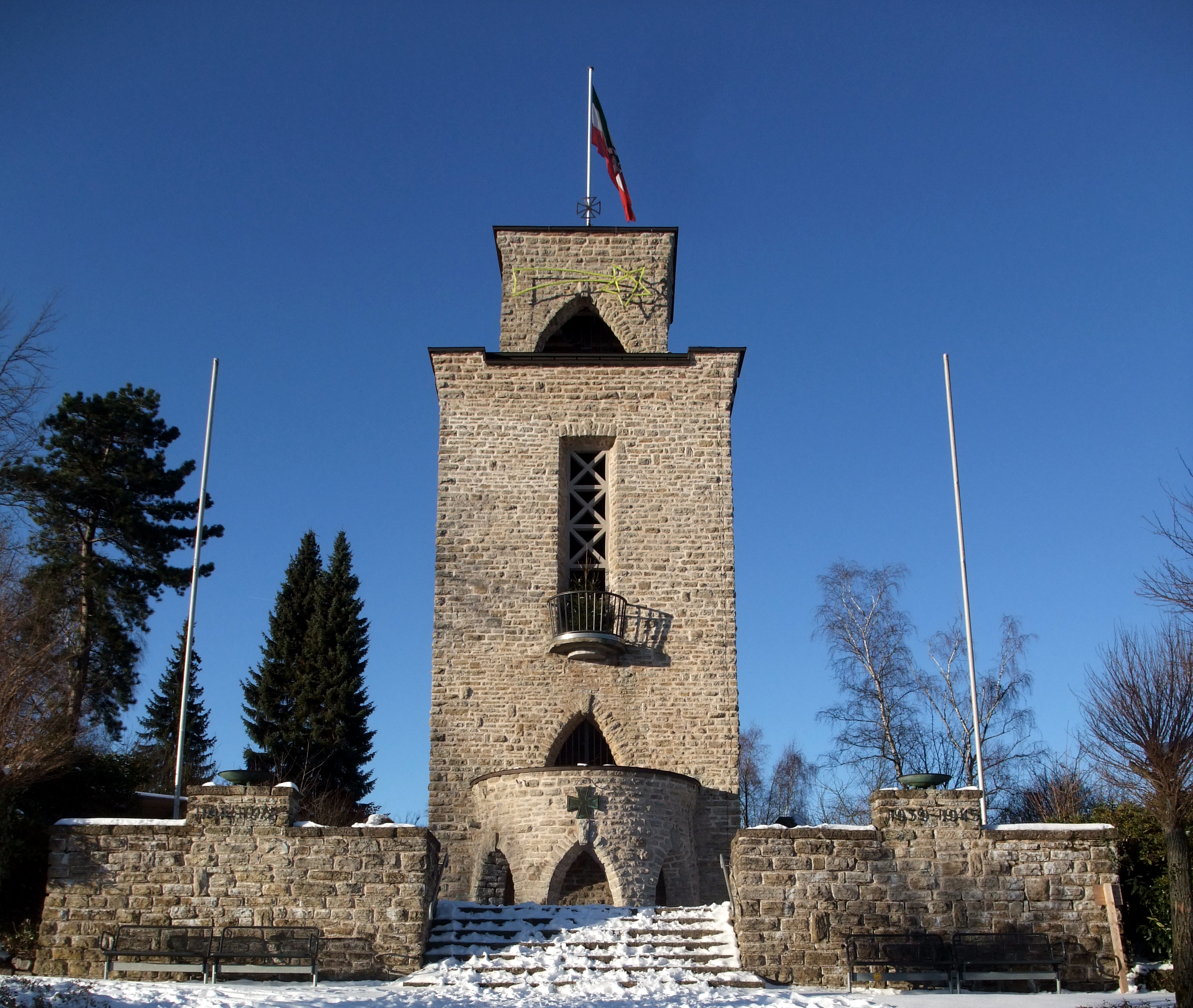
Langscheid War Memorial look-out tower

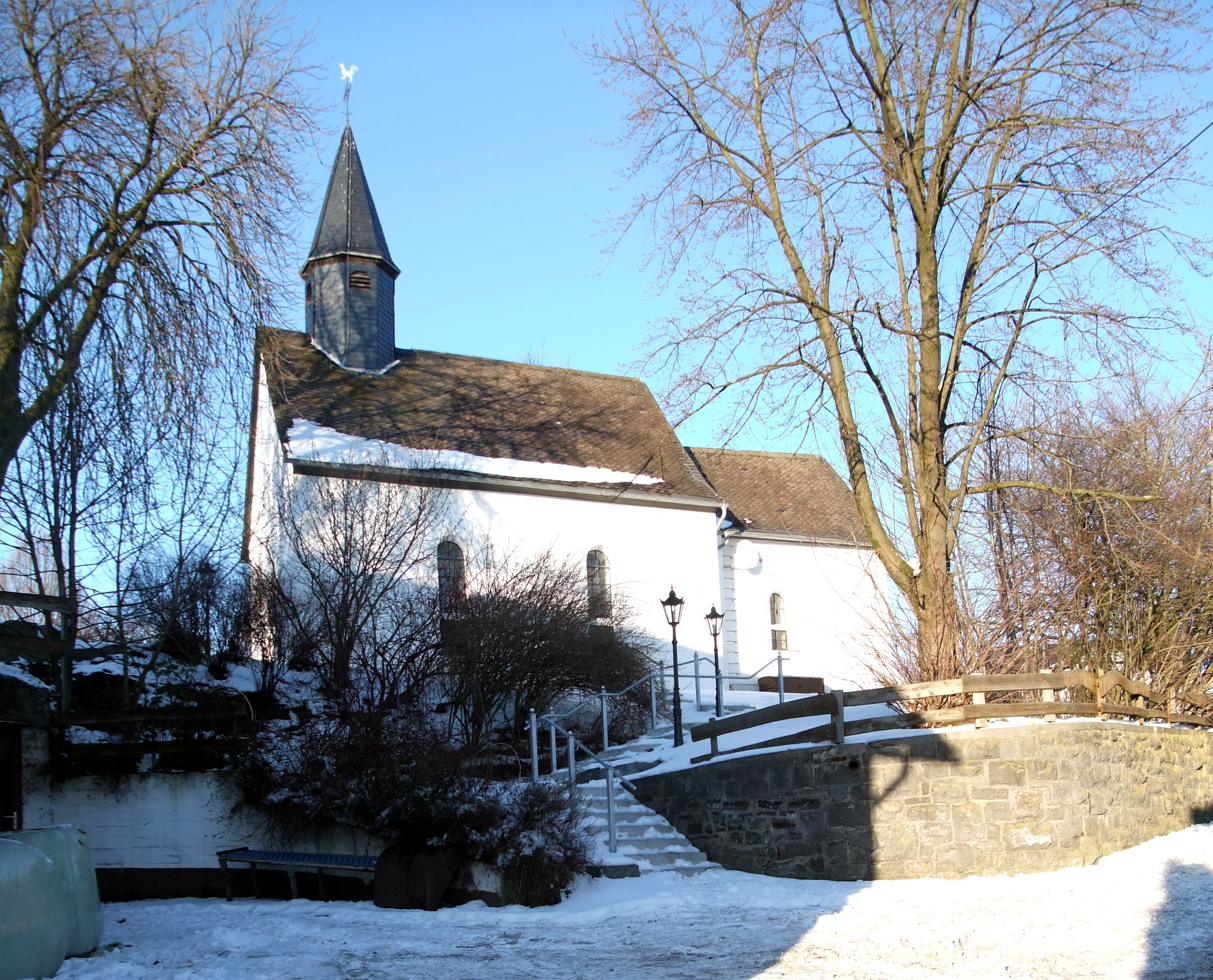
Former chapel turned parrish hall

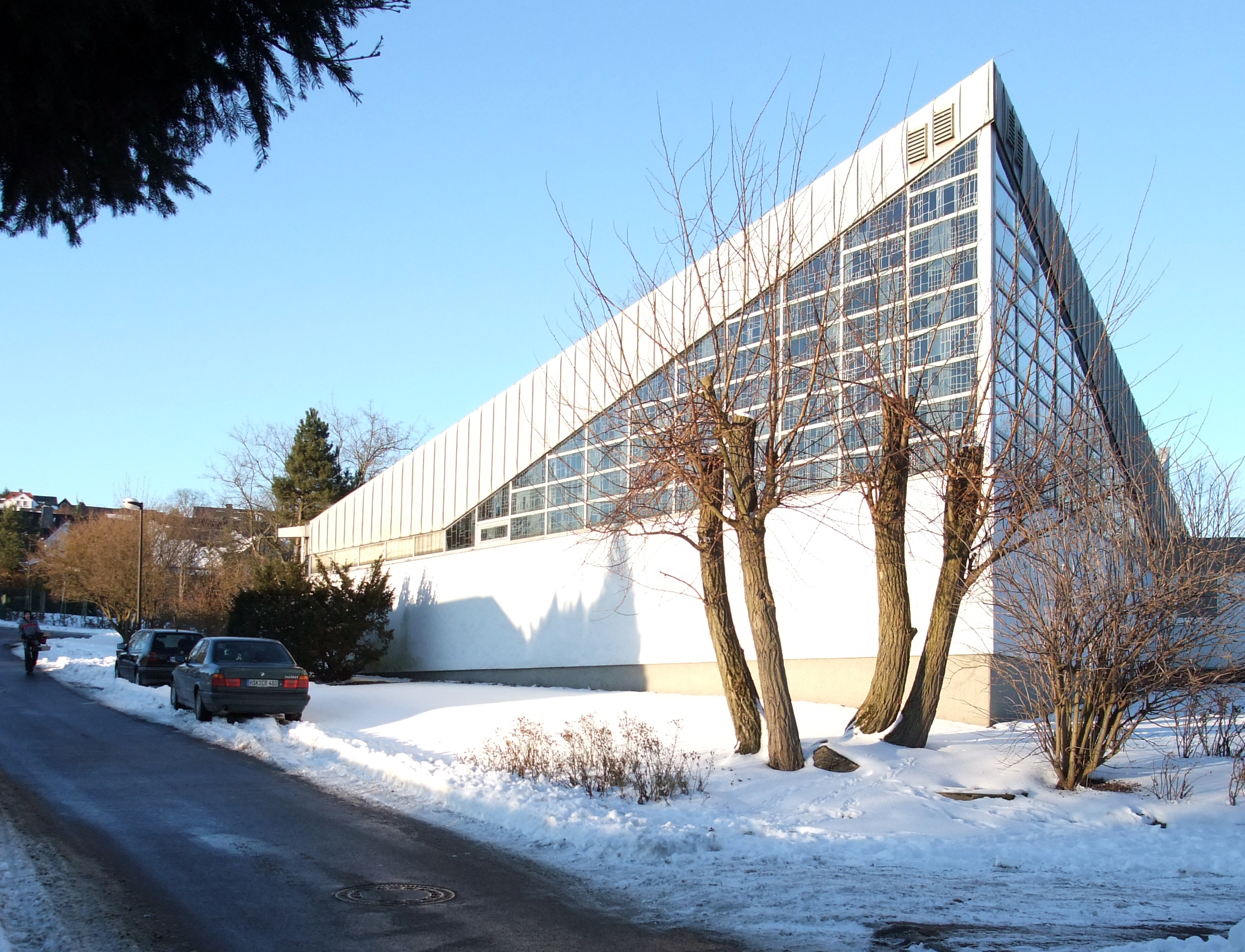
Protestant church Markuskirche

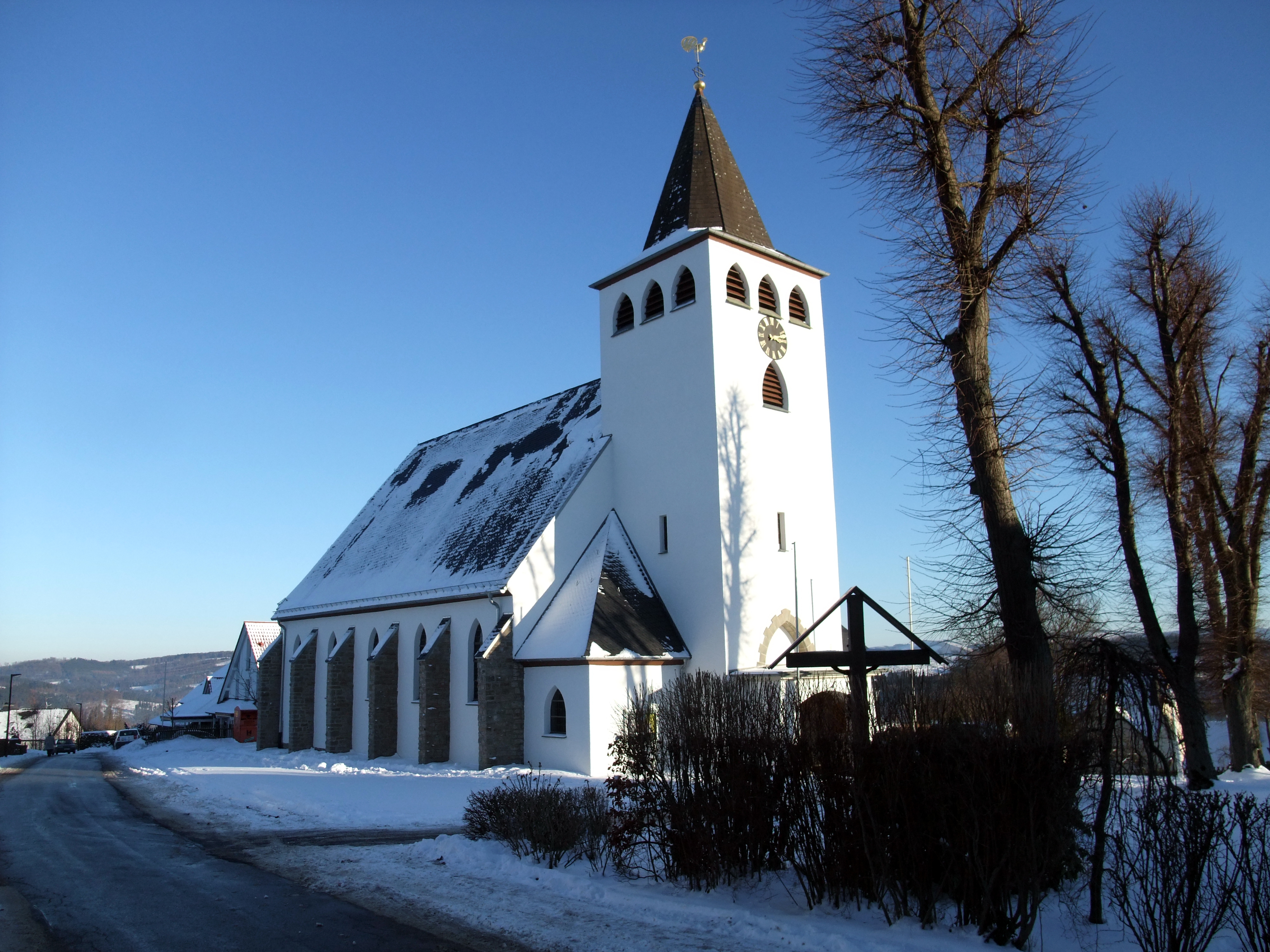
Catholic parrish church St. Anthony

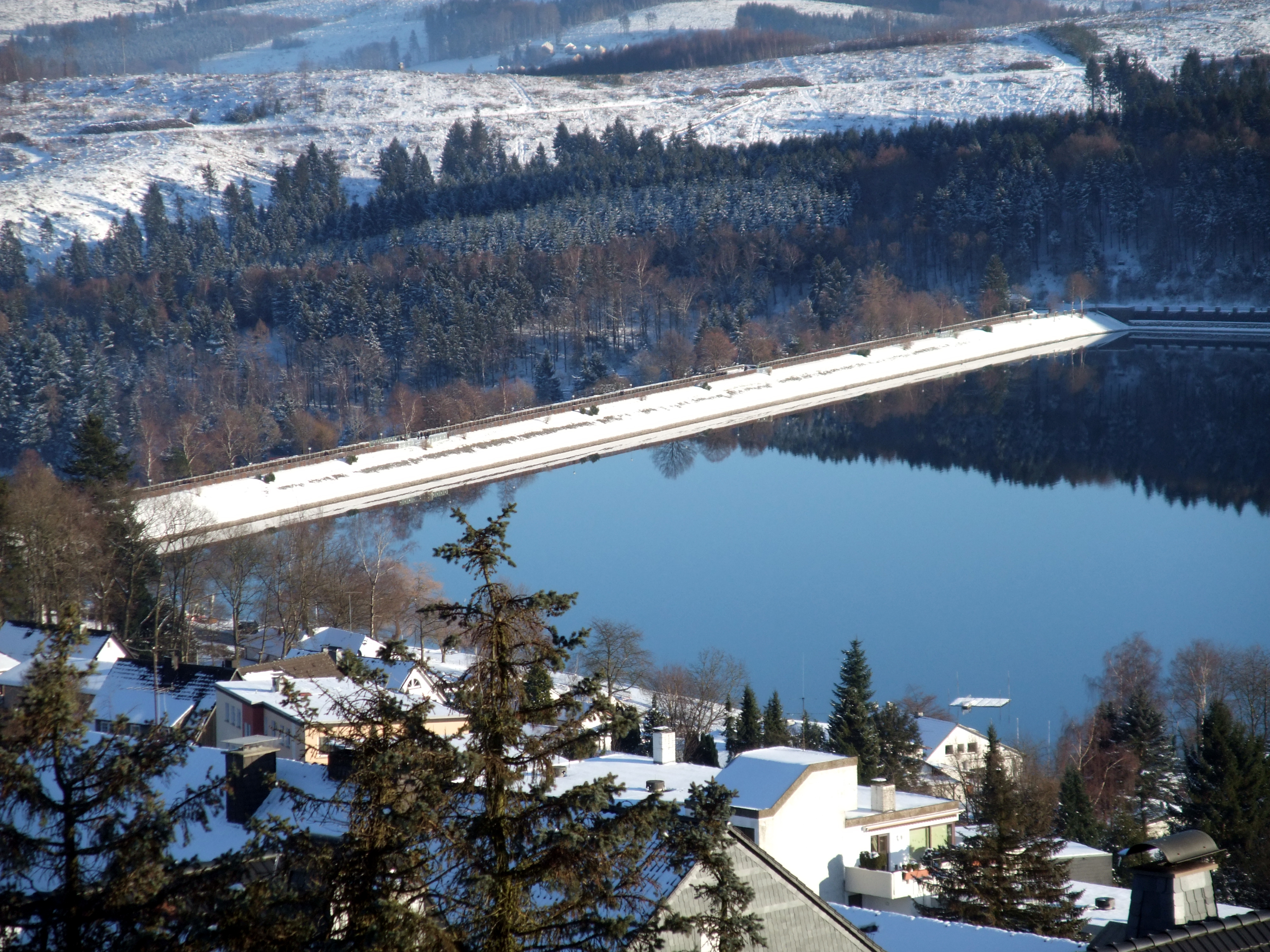
Sorpe dam as seen from the look-out tower

== Literature ==
- Freiheit Langscheid. Geschichte eines sauerländischen Dorfes. 1307-2007. 2007 (in German)
