= Estinghausen (Sundern) =

Coordinates: 51°22′26″N 7°56′39″E

Estinghausen is a village in Sundern (Sauerland) in North Rhine-Westphalia.

== History ==
The oldest known mention of Estinghausen dates from 1285. In the middle ages, the village consisted of three manors. In 1444, when Gordert von Beringhausen sold them to the Kloster Oelinghausen, a fourth manor that was split off one of the three and was tithe-free. In the 19th and 20th century, Estinghausen was an independent municipality in Amt Hüsten.

In the first days of the Federal Republic of Germany, it was one of the smallest independent municipalities, with only 14 to 24 eligible voters. A municipal reform took place in 1975 and merged it into Sundern.

== Bibliography ==
- Literature about Estinghausen at the Biography of North Rhine-Westphalia
- Heribert Heymer: 700 Jahre Estinghausen. In: Sauerland 3/1985 S. 83
