= Hachen =

- Ortschaft of Sundern
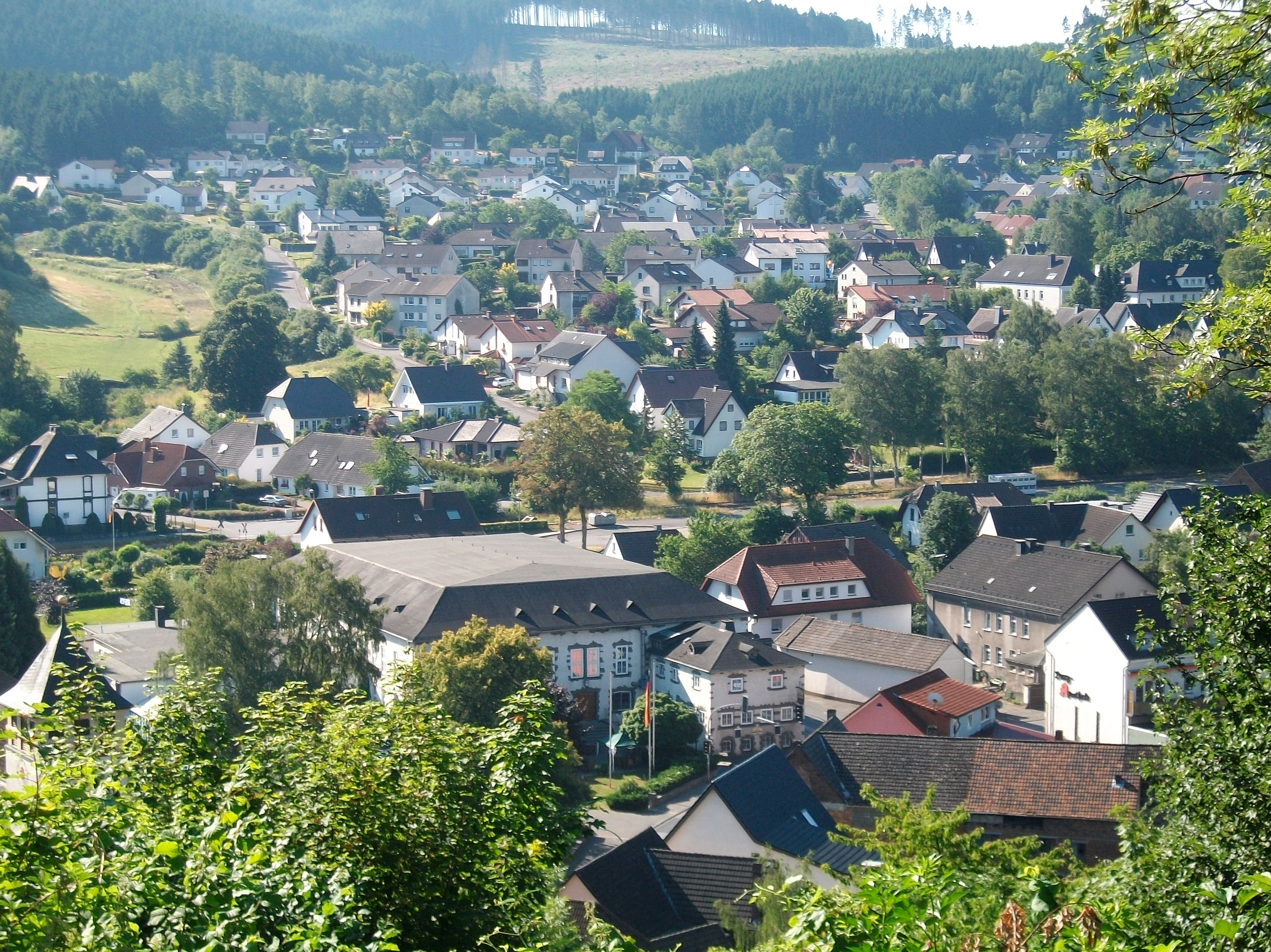
- Hachen

- Coat of arms
- Interactive map of Hachen
- Location within Germany Location within North Rhine-Westphalia
- Coordinates: 51°22′N 07°58′E
- Country: Germany
- State: North Rhine-Westphalia
- Admin. region: Arnsberg
- District: Hochsauerlandkreis
- Town: Sundern
- Elevation: 207 m (679 ft)

Population
  - Total: 2,773
- Time zone: UTC+01:00 (CET)
  - Summer (DST): UTC+02:00 (CEST)
- Dialling codes: 02935
- Website: www.hachen.nrw

Hachen (German pronunciation: [ˈhaxn̩]) is an Ortschaft (subdivision) of the town of Sundern in the Hochsauerland district of North Rhine-Westphalia, Germany. It is the second largest Ortschaft of Sundern.

== Location ==
Hachen and the associated village of Reigern border the Arnsberg districts of Müschede and Wennigloh to the north and east. Hachen borders Enkhausen to the west, Langscheid to the southwest and Stemel to the south. It is located between the tourist destinations of Arnsberg Forest Nature Park and the Sauerland-Rothaargebirge Nature Park, and is about 3 km from the Sorpesee.

== History ==
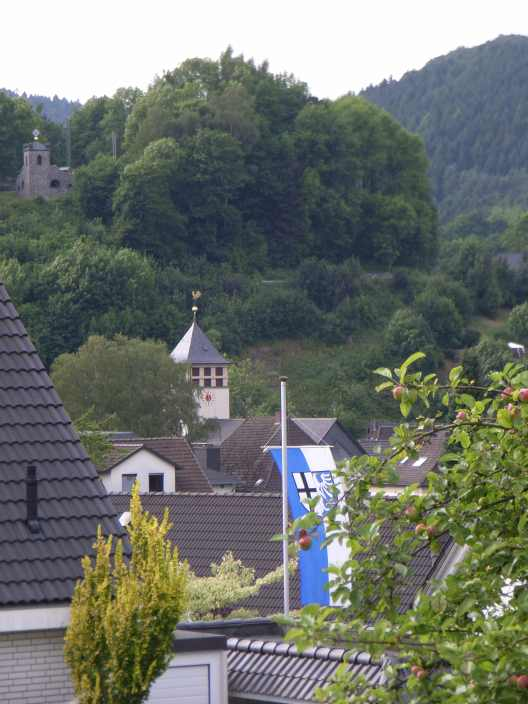

=== Middle Ages ===
Hachen was already documented in 793 in the goods register of Werden Abbey. The place name can also be found more frequently in Westphalia with compound place names. The spelling of the name changed over the centuries (for example, Hagnen in 793, Hakkene in 1000, Hagne in the Middle Ages). The current place name was granted in a document by Pope Alexander II from 1173. Hachen was probably a free city since the beginning of the 14th century, on the model of the city rights of Lippstadt, but without fortifications and thus had the right to carry its own seal. The first known seal was granted from 1652. The two-part seal shows a cross on the right and half an eagle on the other. The transcription is now barely readable. The settlement was not planned, but grew gradually, with houses built around the castle. Outside the area of the castle, courtyards stood at further intervals. Its craftsmen had the right to form guilds, and the place was allowed to levy tariffs and hold markets.

=== 19th century ===
The first cadastral maps were created in 1820, and from 1844 records of the meetings of the municipal council were kept, which indicate that the municipality was one of the most needy in the period around 1845. In 1845, the area was badly damaged in a fire. Connection to the telecommunications network took place around 1890. Hachen belonged from 1837 to 31 December 1974 to the administrative area of Hüsten.

=== Postwar period ===
After the Second World War, Clemens Schulte was appointed mayor by the military government, and sworn in at the first meeting after the election of 25 September 1946. Josef Schulte Angels was elected as his successor, who until 24 November 1952 and was replaced by Karl König in 1967. The last mayor of Hachen was Josef Cordes. On 1 January 1975 Hachen was merged into Sundern as a part of the local government reform in North Rhine-Westphalia. Freiheit Hachen thus lost its independent municipal unity. In the years since 1844, only one woman has been a member of the municipal representation, Maria Potthoff.
