= Ebbe Mountains =

Mountain range in Germany

Ebbe Mountains (Ebbegebirge)
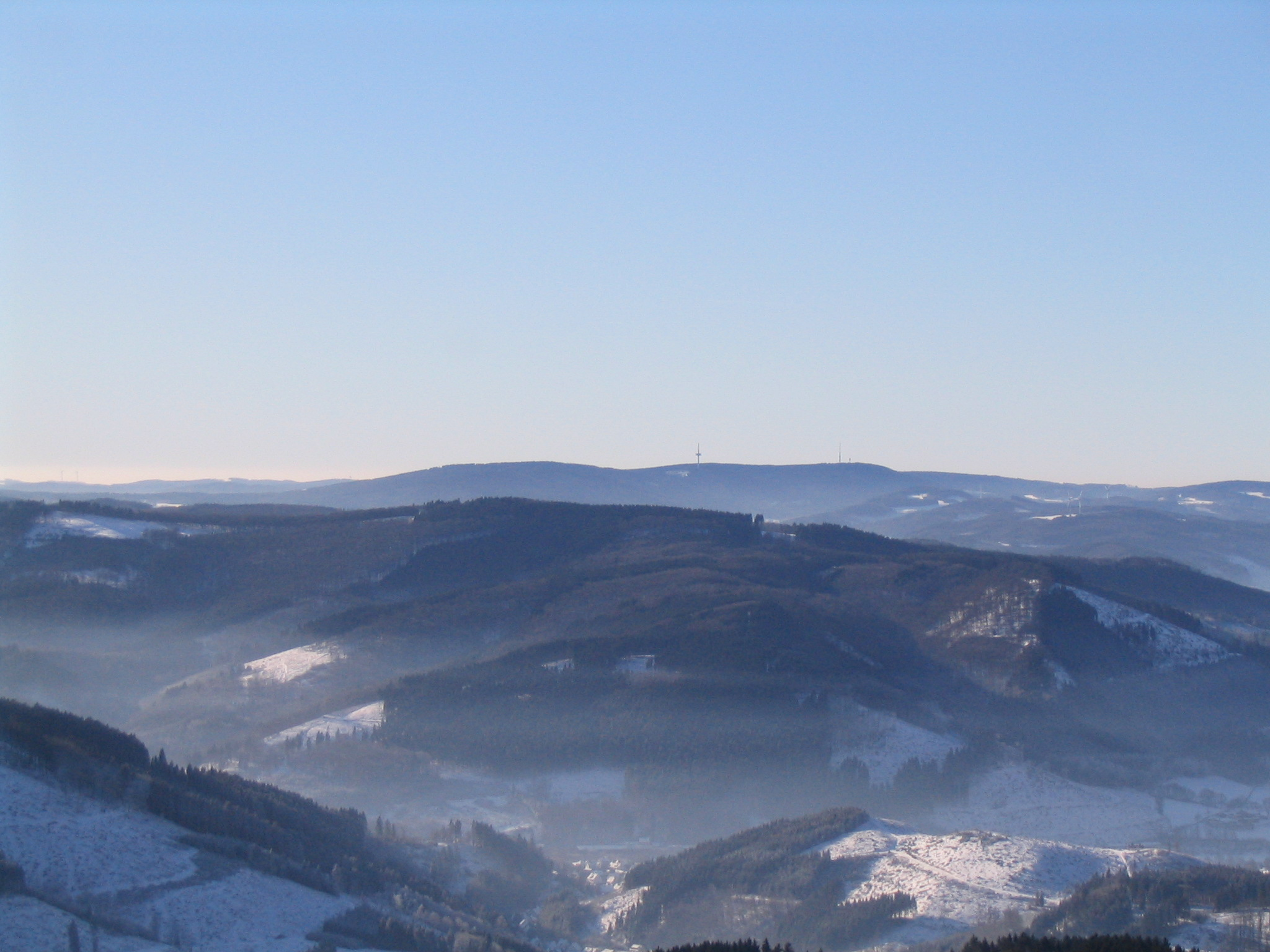
- The Ebbe from the northeast (Schomberg Observation Tower)

Highest point
- Peak: Nordhelle
- Elevation: 663 m (2,175 ft)
- Coordinates: 51°8′54″N 7°45′23″E

Dimensions
- Length: 12 km (7.5 mi)

Geography
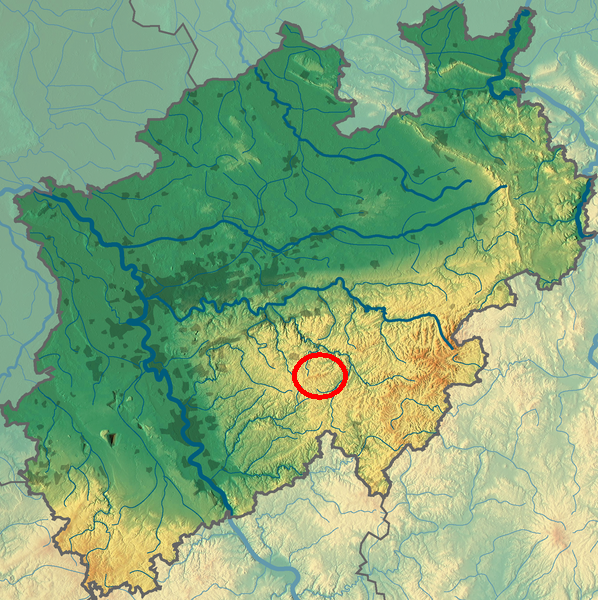
- Location of the Ebbe within North Rhine-Westphalia
- Country: Germany
- State: North Rhine-Westphalia
- Region: Sauerland
- Districts: Märkischer Kreis and Olpe
- Parent range: Rhenish Massif

The Ebbe Mountains (German: Ebbegebirge, pronounced [ˈɛbəɡəˌbɪʁɡə]) or Ebbe ([ˈɛbə]) form a range of uplands up to 663.3 m above sea level (NN) high in the German state of North Rhine-Westphalia. They have given their name to the Ebbe Mountain Nature Park and are part of the Süder Uplands within the Rhine Massif.

== Geography ==
=== Location ===
The Ebbe lies in the Sauerland in the districts of Märkischer Kreis and Olpe. It stretches between Herscheid and Plettenberg (outside the area) in the north, Attendorn and Finnentrop (outside the area) in the east, the Biggesee in the south and Kierspe and Meinerzhagen in the west, where the Ebbe Hills are surrounded by the Ebbe Hills Nature Park. It is grazed by the A 45 motorway in the west.

=== Hills ===
The highest elevation in the Ebbe Mountains is the Nordhelle (663.3 m above NN) between Valbert and Herscheid. Other notable hills are the: Rehberg (645.9 m), Rüenhardt (636.0 m), Waldberg (ca. 635 m), Rothenstein (ca. 600 m), Der Griesing (552,6 m), Homert (538,3 m) and Kahler Kopf (540.1 m).

=== Rivers and lakes ===
The following rivers rise in the Ebbe or around its edges: the Bruchbach, Else, Fürwigge, Ihne, Lister, Oesterbach, Verse and Volme. Within the Ebbe and its foothills are the Ahaus Reservoir, the Biggesee and the Fürwigge, Jubach, Lister, Oester and Verse Dams.

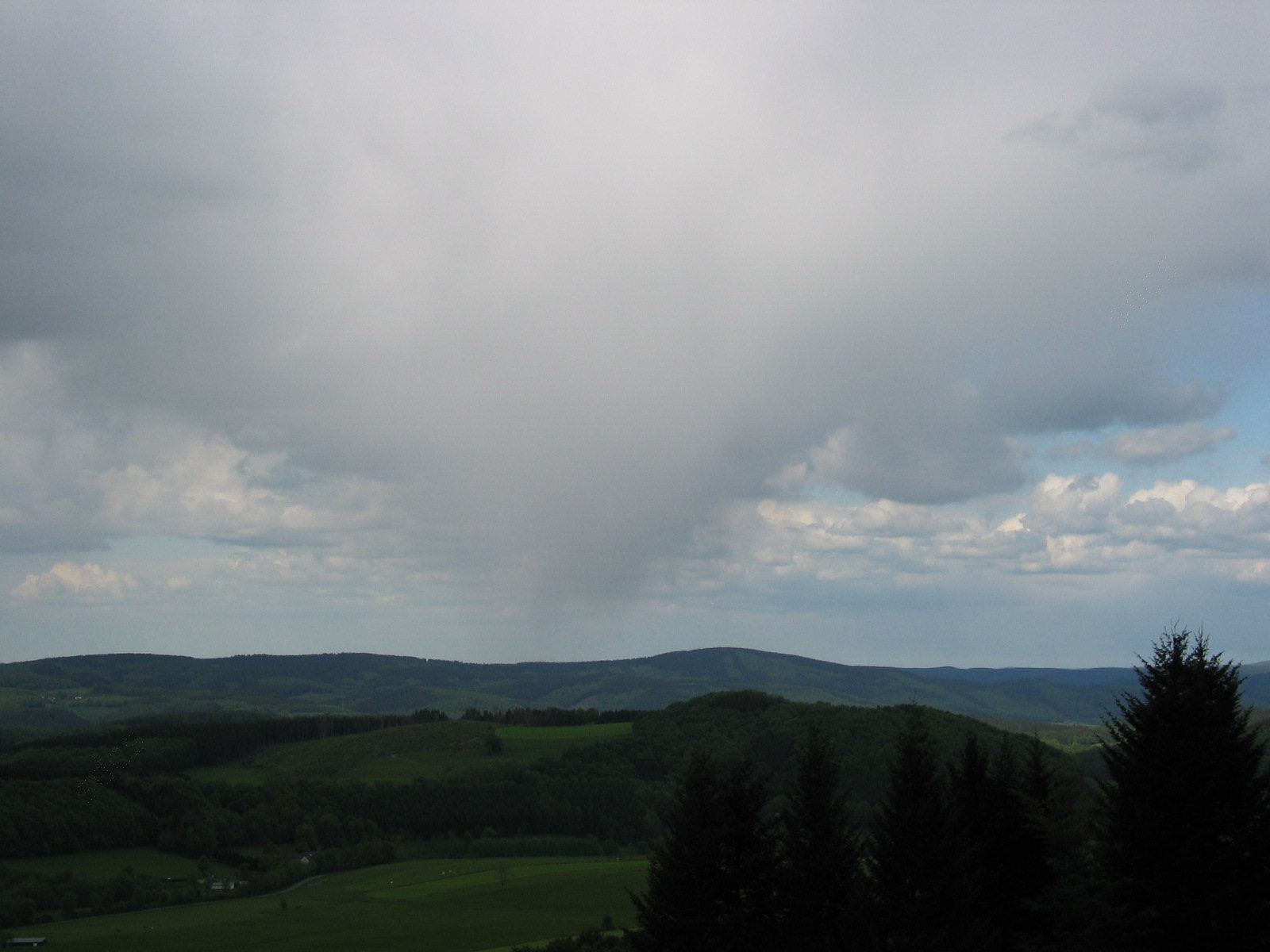
The Ebbe Mountains near Herscheid
