= Günse =

River in Germany

Location
- Country: Germany
- States: North Rhine-Westphalia

Physical characteristics
- Mouth
  - location: Olpe
  - coordinates: 51.0297°N 7.8519°E

Basin features
- Progression: Olpe→ Bigge→ Lenne→ Ruhr→ Rhine→ North Sea

Günse (German pronunciation: [ˈɡʏnzə]) is a river of North Rhine-Westphalia, Germany. It is 5 km long and a left tributary of the Olpe.

== See also ==
- List of rivers of North Rhine-Westphalia
