= Rose (Brachtpe) =

River in Germany

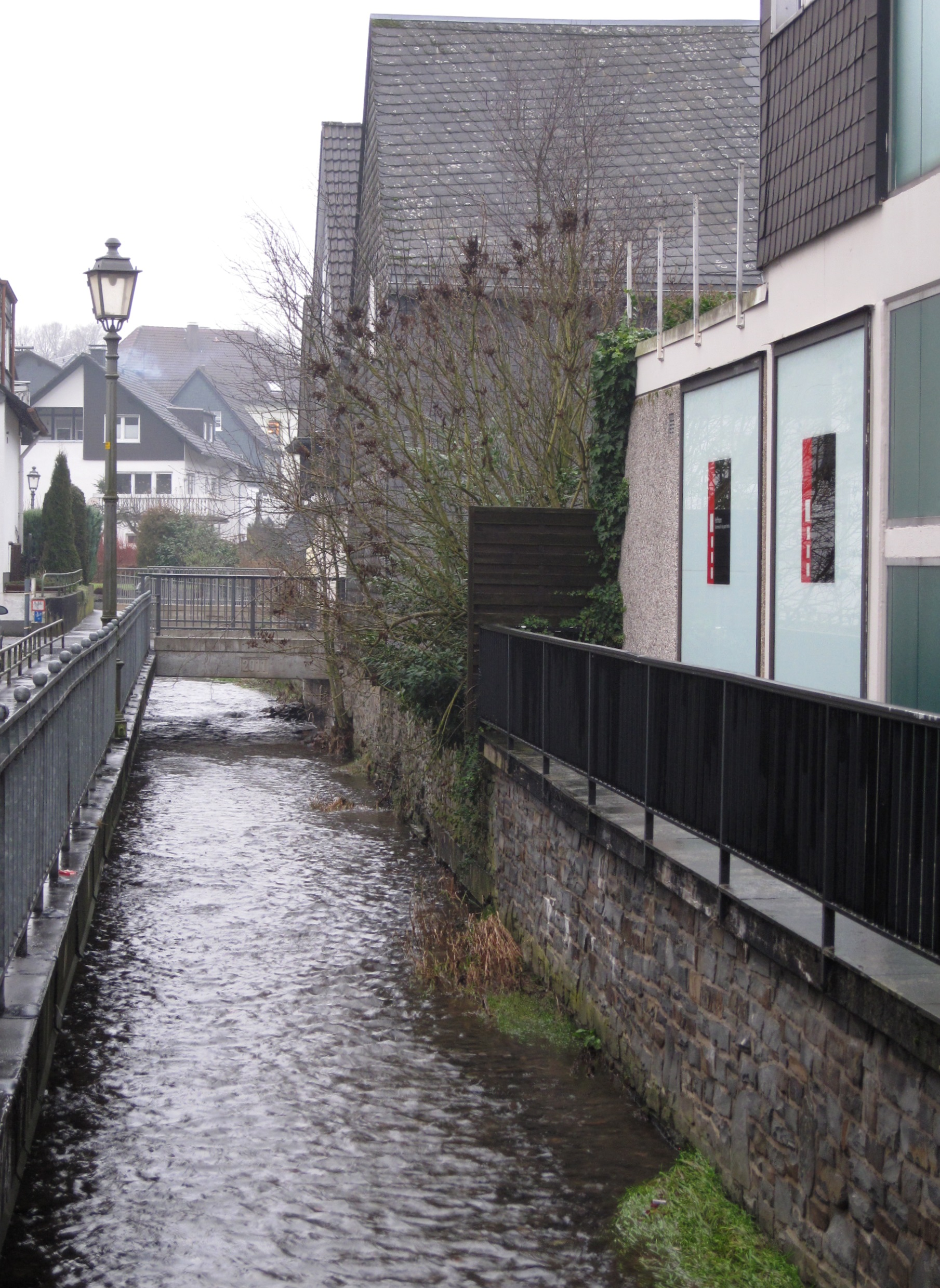

Location
- Country: Germany
- States: North Rhine-Westphalia

Physical characteristics
- Mouth
  - location: Brachtpe
  - coordinates: 51.0211°N 7.8155°E

Basin features
- Progression: Brachtpe→ Bigge→ Lenne→ Ruhr→ Rhine→ North Sea

Rose is a river which flows through North Rhine-Westphalia, Germany. It is 8.1 km (5.0 mi) long and is a left tributary of the river Brachtpe.

== See also ==
- List of rivers of North Rhine-Westphalia
