= Neger (Bieke) =

River in Germany

Location
- Country: Germany
- State: North Rhine-Westphalia

Physical characteristics
- Mouth
  - location: Bieke
  - coordinates: 51.0611°N 7.8666°E
- Length: 3.9 km (2.4 mi)

Basin features
- Progression: Bieke→ Bigge→ Lenne→ Ruhr→ Rhine→ North Sea

Neger (German pronunciation: [ˈneːɡɐ]) is a river of North Rhine-Westphalia, Germany. It is a right tributary of the Bieke.

== See also ==
- List of rivers of North Rhine-Westphalia
