= Albaumer Bach =

River in Germany

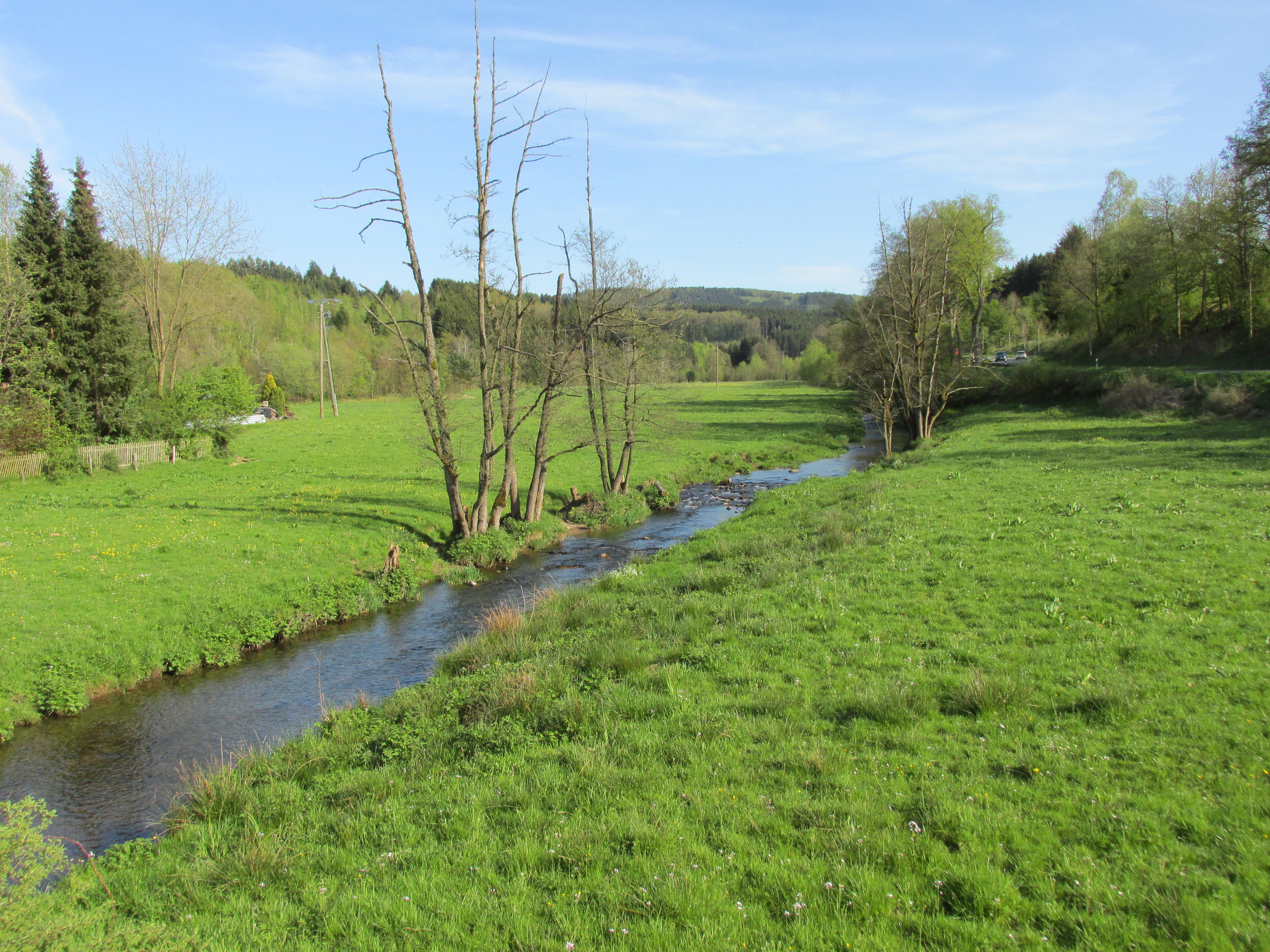
- Albaumer Bach at Würdinghausen, Kirchhundem, Germany

Location
- Country: Germany
- State: North Rhine-Westphalia

Physical characteristics
- Mouth
  - location: Hundem
  - coordinates: 51.0895°N 8.1099°E
- Length: 13.3 km (8.3 mi)

Basin features
- Progression: Hundem→ Lenne→ Ruhr→ Rhine→ North Sea

The Albaumer Bach is a river of North Rhine-Westphalia, Germany. It flows into the Hundem near Würdinghausen.

== See also ==
- List of rivers of North Rhine-Westphalia
