= Olpe =

Olpe may refer to

- Olpe (container), an Ancient Greek jug for wine
- Olpe, Kansas, a city in Kansas, United States
- Olpe, Germany, a town in North Rhine-Westphalia, Germany
- Olpe (district), a Kreis (district) of North Rhine-Westphalia, Germany
- Olpe (Bigge), a river of North Rhine-Westphalia, Germany, tributary of the Bigge
- Olpe (Hundem), a river of North Rhine-Westphalia, Germany, tributary of the Hundem
