= Glingebach =

River in Germany

Glingebach (Falbecke)

Location
- Country: Germany
- States: North Rhine-Westphalia

Physical characteristics
- Source
  - elevation: 447 m (1,467 ft)
- Mouth
  - location: Lenne
  - coordinates: 51.2169°N 7.9543°E
  - elevation: 219 m (719 ft)
- Length: 6.55 km (4.07 mi)
- Basin size: 12.623 km^{2} (4.874 sq mi)

Basin features
- Progression: Lenne→ Ruhr→ Rhine→ North Sea

Glingebach (upper course: Falbecke) is a river in Finnentrop, North Rhine-Westphalia, Germany. It is 6.5 km long and a right tributary of the Lenne river.

== See also ==
- List of rivers of North Rhine-Westphalia
