= Olpe (Hundem) =

River of North Rhine-Westphalia, Germany

Location
- Country: Germany
- State: North Rhine-Westphalia

Physical characteristics
- Mouth
  - location: Hundem
  - coordinates: 51.0895°N 8.0813°E
- Length: 15.4 km (9.6 mi)

Basin features
- Progression: Hundem→ Lenne→ Ruhr→ Rhine→ North Sea

Olpe (German pronunciation: [ˈɔlpə]) is a river of North Rhine-Westphalia, Germany. It is a left tributary of the Hundem.

== See also ==
- List of rivers of North Rhine-Westphalia
