= Grafschaft (disambiguation) =

Grafschaft is a German term for county, in the sense that it is an area which belongs (or belonged) to a count (German: Graf).

Grafschaft can also refer to:

- Grafschaft, Rhineland, a municipality in Rhineland-Palatinate, Germany
- Grafschaft (Schmallenberg), a part of Schmallenberg, in North Rhine-Westphalia, Germany
- Grafschaft Abbey, in Schmallenberg
- Grafschaft (Lenne), a river of North Rhine-Westphalia, Germany
- Grafschaft, Switzerland, a municipality of the canton of Valais
