= Grüner Bach =

River in Germany

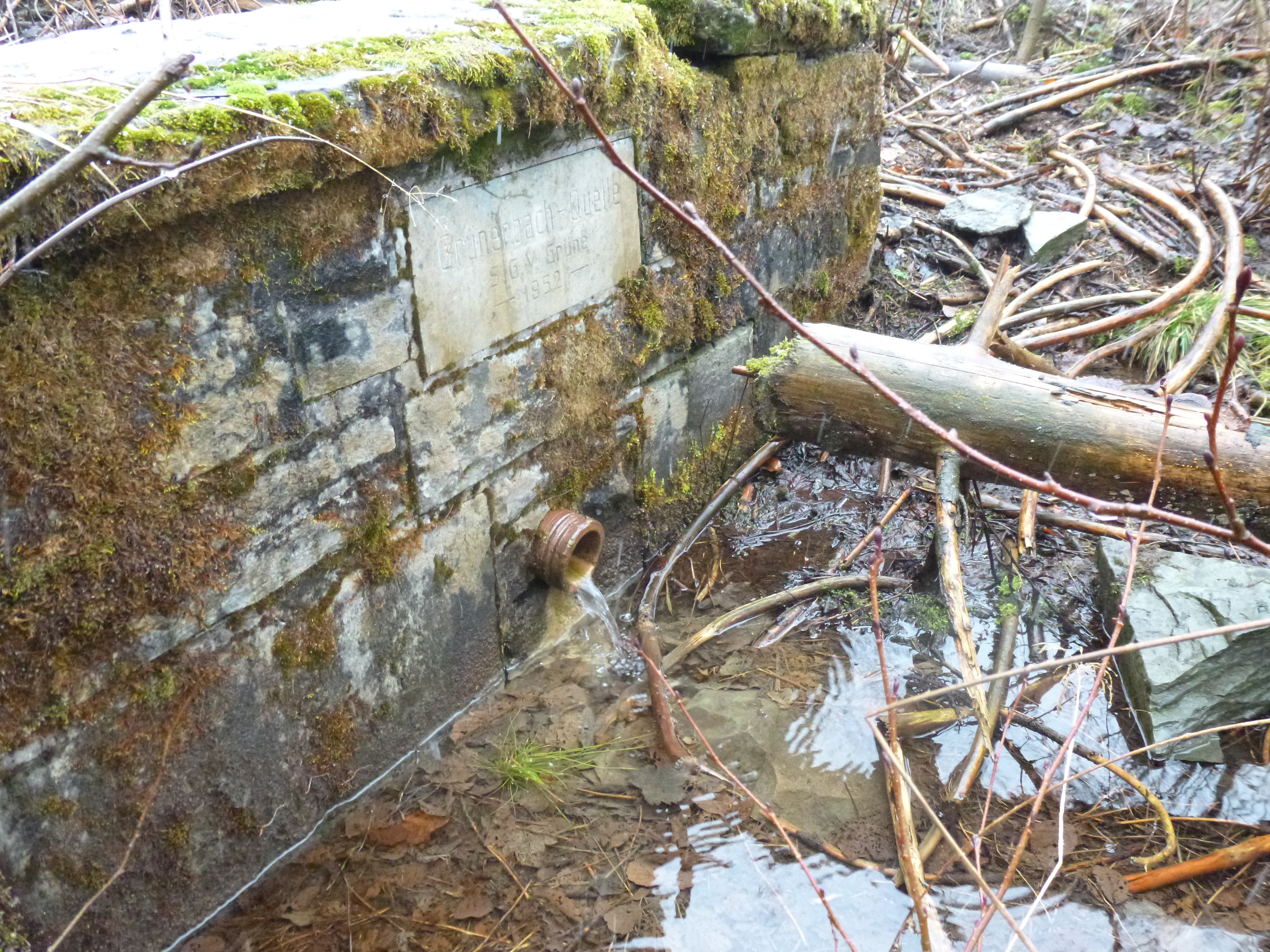

Location
- Country: Germany
- State: North Rhine-Westphalia

Physical characteristics
- Mouth
  - location: Lenne
  - coordinates: 51.3620°N 7.6347°E
- Length: 11.6 km (7.2 mi)

Basin features
- Progression: Lenne→ Ruhr→ Rhine→ North Sea

Grüner Bach is a river of North Rhine-Westphalia, Germany. It flows into the Lenne near Oestrich.

== See also ==
- List of rivers of North Rhine-Westphalia
