= Plettenberg =

- Town
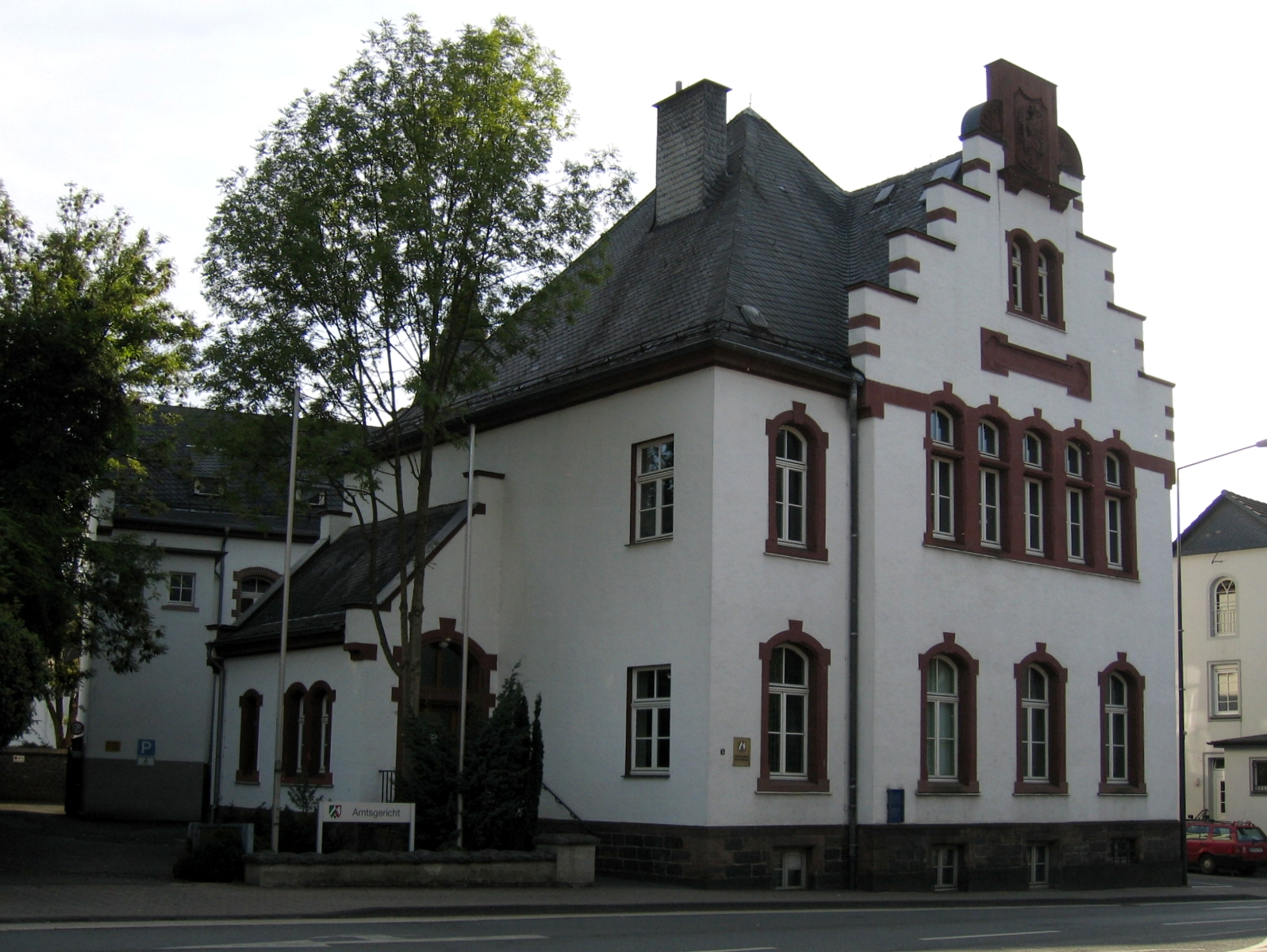
- District Amtsgericht in Plettenberg

- Coat of arms

- Location of Plettenberg within Märkischer Kreis district
- Interactive map of Plettenberg
- Location within Germany Location within North Rhine-Westphalia
- Coordinates: 51°13′N 07°53′E
- Country: Germany
- State: North Rhine-Westphalia
- Admin. region: Arnsberg
- District: Märkischer Kreis

Government
  - Mayor (2020–25): Ulrich Schulte (Ind.)

Area
  - Total: 96.75 km^{2} (37.36 sq mi)
- Elevation: 194–593 m (636–1,946 ft)

Population (2025-12-31)
  - Total: 24,189
  - Density: 250.0/km^{2} (647.5/sq mi)
- Time zone: UTC+01:00 (CET)
  - Summer (DST): UTC+02:00 (CEST)
- Postal codes: 58840
- Dialling codes: 02391
- Vehicle registration: MK
- Website: www.plettenberg.de

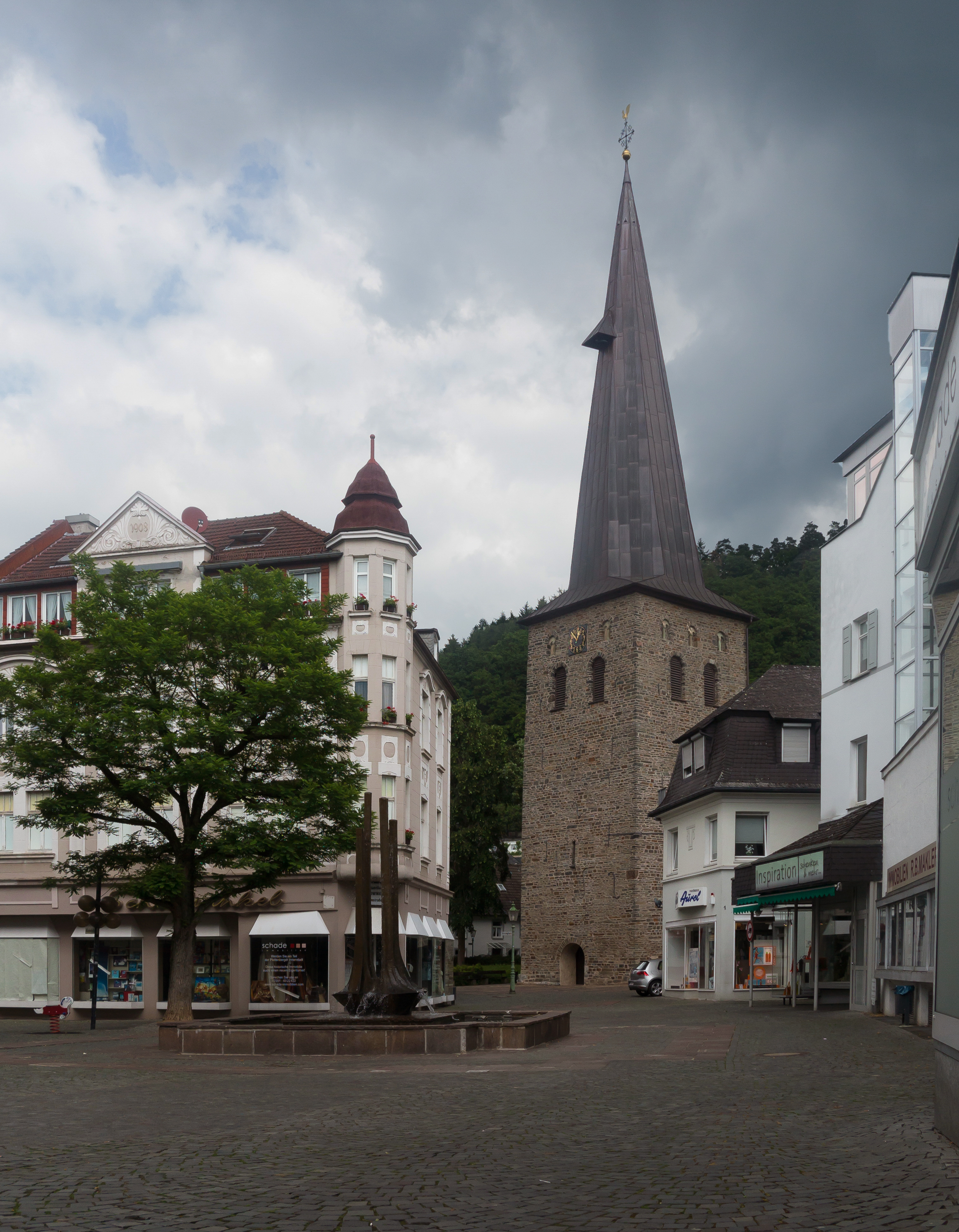
Plettenberg, reformed church (Christuskirche)

Plettenberg (German: [ˈplɛtn̩ˌbɛʁk]; Westphalian: Plettmert) is a town in the Märkischer Kreis, in North Rhine-Westphalia, Germany.

== Geography ==
Plettenberg is located to the west of the Sauerland hills. The highest elevation of the town area is in the Ebbe Mountains with 663 m above sea level, the lowest elevation with 194 m near Teindeln. The town is spread out between the four valleys of the rivers Lenne, Else, Oester and Grüne.

=== Division of the town ===
Plettenberg consists of 5 districts:

- Plettenberg (town centre) (14,012 inhabitants)
- Eiringhausen (4,905 inhabitants)
- Holthausen/upper Elsetal (3,985 inhabitants)
- Oestertal (3,055 inhabitants)
- Ohle (2,825 inhabitants)

== History ==
Probably the first written proof of Plettenberg was made in a document from Grafschaft Abbey of Anno II, archbishop of Cologne, at that time named Heslipho. The name was later changed to Plettenberg, as the name of the noble family von Plettenberg, who owned virtually all of the town and surrounding lands.

The Dukes of the Mark bought the town from Cologne, who in 1301 built the castle Schwarzenberg (which was destroyed by fire in 1864). In 1387, Count Engelbert III granted the town some privileges, it received full town rights in 1397 from Count Dietrich von der Mark. At the same time, the town was fortified. The town blossomed in the following centuries thanks to mining and iron casting, as well as trading with the Hanseatic League.

In 1941, the town was enlarged to its current size, when the former town and the surrounding Amt were merged.

== Population development ==
Historical population

Year	Pop.	±% p.a.
1719	749	—
1758	1,051	+0.87%
1765	933	−1.69%
1818	1,307	+0.64%
1839	1,539	+0.78%
1849	1,652	+0.71%
1871	1,976	+0.82%
1910	5,981	+2.88%
1933	7,169	+0.79%
1965	29,817	+4.55%
1970	30,288	+0.31%

Year	Pop.	±% p.a.
1975	29,270	−0.68%
1980	29,045	−0.15%
1985	27,473	−1.11%
1990	29,083	+1.15%
1995	29,519	+0.30%
2000	29,031	−0.33%
2005	28,003	−0.72%
2010	26,321	−1.23%
2015	25,781	−0.41%
2020	24,978	−0.63%
2025	24,189	−0.64%

Source: Landesdatabank Nordrhein-Westfalen (1965-2025)

== Mayors ==
- 1902–1924: Rudolf Emil Gottlob Köhler
- 1925–1930: Ludwig Schneider
- 1934–1938: Engelbert Wahle
- 1945–1948: Wilhelm Ding (SPD)
- 1948–1951: Karl Halfmann (CDU)
- 1951–1954: Emil Arndt (SPD)
- 1954–1956: Paul Thomee (FDP)
- 1956–1960: Heinz Chmill (SPD)
- 1960–1964: Wilhelm Wicker (CDU)
- 1964–1983: Heinz Baberg (SPD)
- 1984–1986: Udo Scheepers (SPD)
- 1986–1999: Otto Klehm (SPD)
- 1999–2004: Walter Stahlschmidt
- 2004–2015: Klaus Müller (SPD)
- since 2015: Ulrich Schulte

== Twin towns – sister cities ==
Plettenberg is twinned with:

- Bludenz, Austria (1988)
- Schleusingen, Germany (1990)

== Coat of arms ==
The coat of arms shows the coat of arms of the counts of Mark in the center. It is displayed between two towers. The coat of arms was granted together with the town rights. In 1794, the crown atop the shield was added in seals of the town. In 1840, the colored version on a shield was adopted.

In 1912, the town council agreed on the historical coat of arms, but the Königliche Heroldsamt in Berlin, which was responsible for the official approval, denied it - at that time the coat of arms of cities were supposed to be crowned by a town wall. However the town council did not want to repeat the symbols (town wall and crown) which was already present in the coat of arms, thus the coat of arms was not officially granted.

After Plettenberg merged with the municipalities of Plettenberg-Land and Ohle in 1940, the council had to decide on the coat of arms again. This time it was officially granted on September 28, 1942, however provisionally due to the war. Yet after the lost war, the coat of arms was never revoked.

The coat of arms of the municipality of Plettenberg-Land showed a silver-blue shield split vertically, the symbol of the master of Plettenberg. It is overlaid with the red-and-white chequered bar of the Mark. The coat of arms was designed by Otto Hupp, and was granted on January 16, 1935. The coat of arms of the Amt Plettenberg was very similar, it only had an additional red shell in the top-left-hand corner as the symbol of the masters of Ohle. Also designed by Otto Hupp it was granted on July 13, 1936.

The coat of arms of the municipality of Ohle shows the Saint Martin of Tours splitting his cloak to share with the beggar. Saint Martin is the patron saint of the church of Ohle. A small escutcheon is placed next to the Saint, showing a red shell on a yellow background, the symbol of the masters of Ohle. The coat of arms was also designed by Otto Hupp, and was granted on October 17, 1935.

== Notable people ==
- William C. Edenborn (1848–1926), businessman, inventor and philanthropist
- Carl Schmitt (1888–1985), philosopher, jurist, political theorist and professor of law
- Ruth Eweler (1913–1947), actress
- Eike Wilm Schulte (1939–2025), opera singer
- Rolf Steininger (born 1942), historian and university professor for contemporary history
- Max Otte (born 1964), German-American economist, author and political activist
- Michael Bartels (born 1968), racing driver
- Marc Hoffmann (born 1973), sex offender and murderer
- Markus Dworrak (born 1978), footballer
