= Lister (river) =

River in Germany

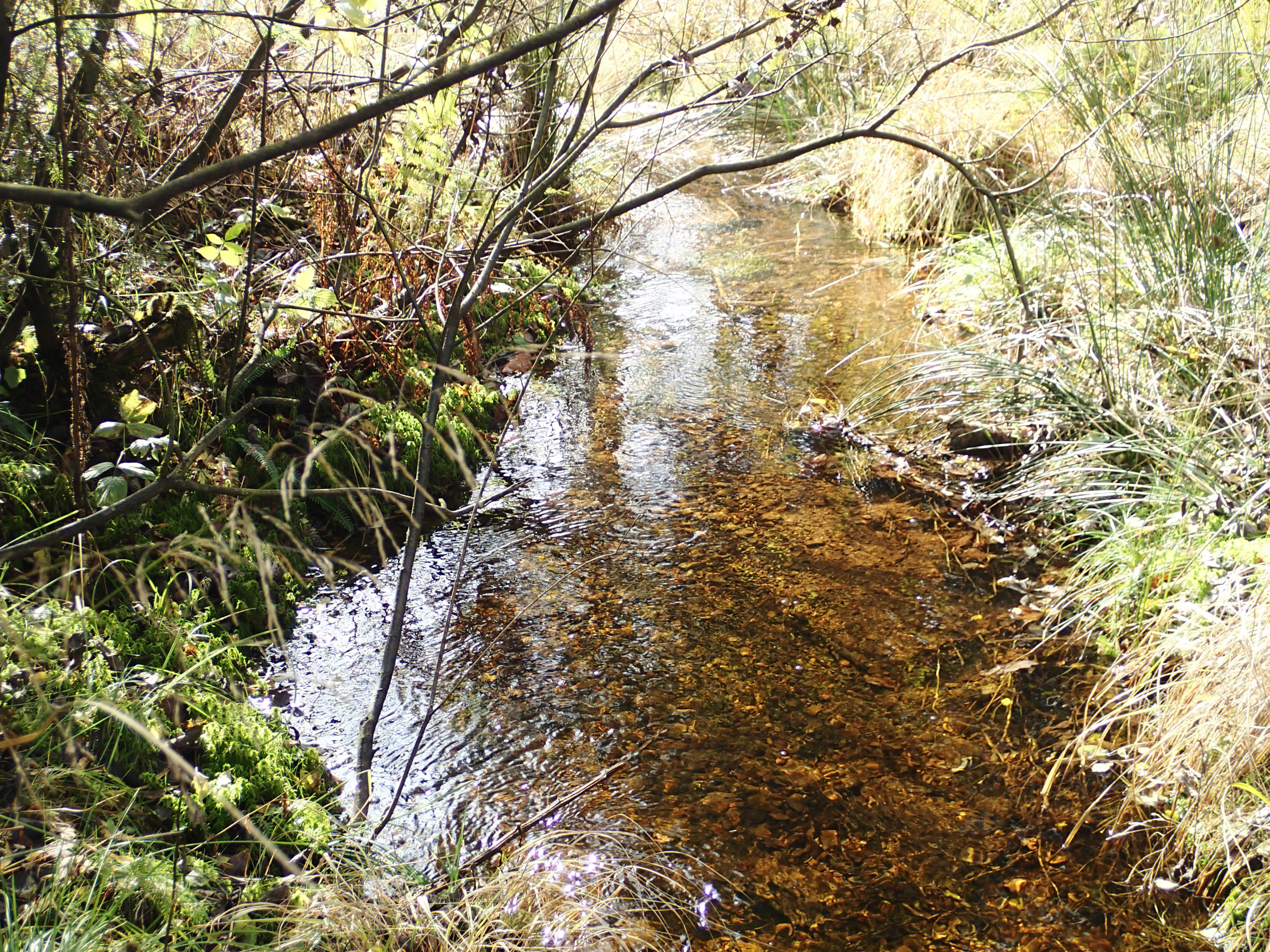
- The Lister directly below its source in the NSG Auf'm Ebbe in Meinerzhagen

Location
- Country: Germany
- State: North Rhine-Westphalia

Physical characteristics
- Mouth
  - location: Bigge
  - coordinates: 51.083°N 7.856°E
- Length: 19.0 km (11.8 mi)

Basin features
- Progression: Bigge→ Lenne→ Ruhr→ Rhine→ North Sea

The Lister is a river of North Rhine-Westphalia, Germany, and a left tributary of the Bigge.

== See also ==
- List of rivers of North Rhine-Westphalia
