= Fretterbach =

River in Germany

Location
- Country: Germany
- State: North Rhine-Westphalia

Physical characteristics
- Mouth
  - location: Lenne
  - coordinates: 51.2051°N 7.9704°E
- Length: 16.7 km (10.4 mi)

Basin features
- Progression: Lenne→ Ruhr→ Rhine→ North Sea

Fretterbach is a river of North Rhine-Westphalia, Germany. It flows into the Lenne north of Finnentrop.

== See also ==
- List of rivers of North Rhine-Westphalia
