= Hartmecke =

River in Germany

Location
- Country: Germany
- States: North Rhine-Westphalia

Physical characteristics
- Mouth
  - location: Lenne
  - coordinates: 51°09′28″N 8°22′23″E

Basin features
- Progression: Lenne→ Ruhr→ Rhine→ North Sea

Hartmecke is a river of North Rhine-Westphalia, Germany. It is 4.3 km long and flows into the Lenne in Oberkirchen near Schmallenberg.

== See also ==
- List of rivers of North Rhine-Westphalia
