= Neger =

Neger is Dutch, German, Norwegian, Swedish and Danish for Negro.

Neger may also refer to:

- Neger (Bieke), a river of North Rhine-Westphalia, Germany, right tributary of the Bieke
- Neger (Ruhr), a river of North Rhine-Westphalia, Germany, left tributary of the Ruhr
- Neger (torpedo), a German torpedo-carrying craft during World War II
- Franz Wilhelm Neger (1868–1923), German botanist, mycologist and dendrologist
