= Waldsiepen =

River in Germany

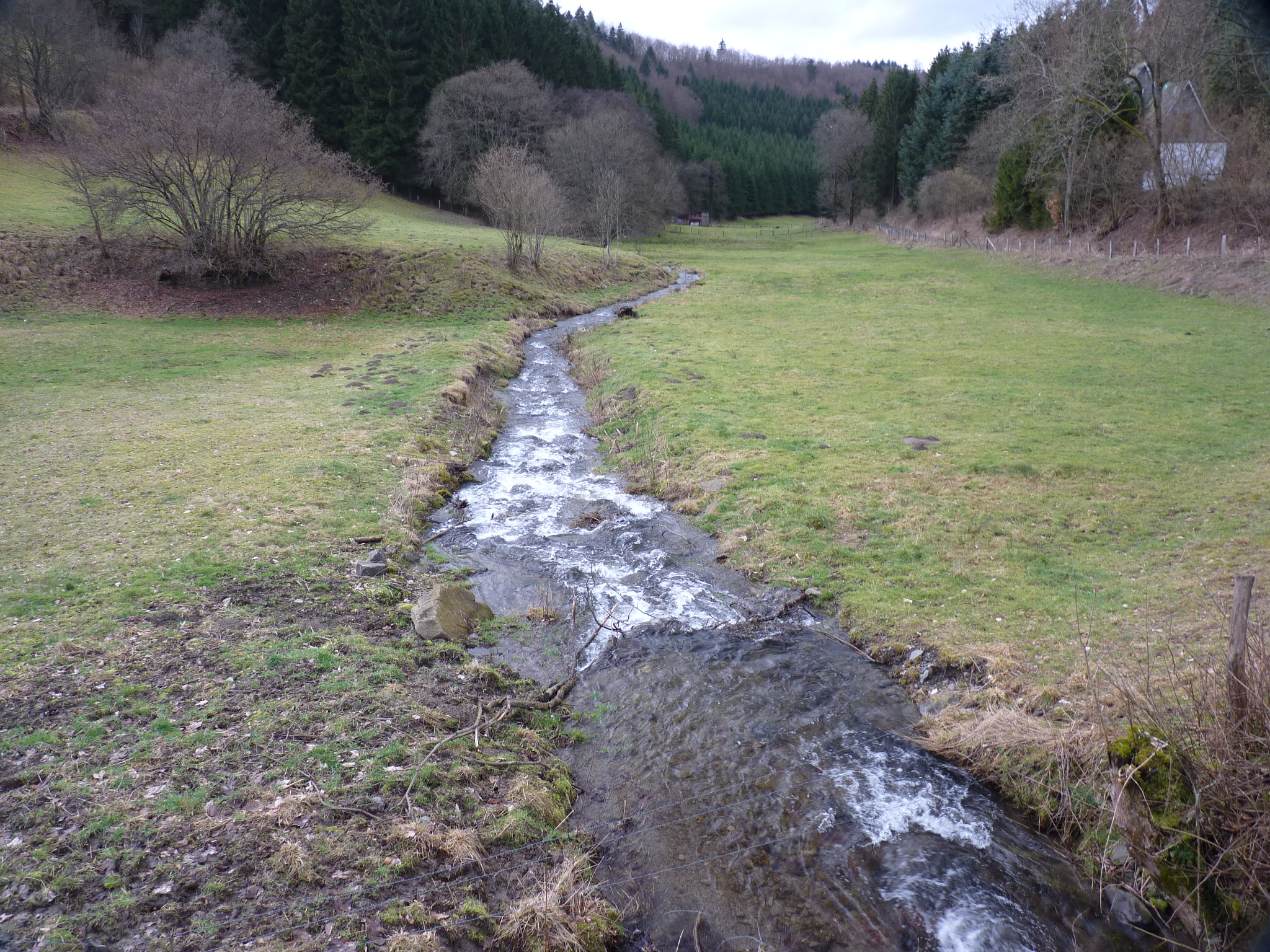

Location
- Country: Germany
- State: North Rhine-Westphalia

Physical characteristics
- Mouth
  - location: Lenne
  - coordinates: 51°09′32″N 8°22′29″E

Basin features
- Progression: Lenne→ Ruhr→ Rhine→ North Sea

Waldsiepen is a river of North Rhine-Westphalia, Germany. It is 4.8 km (3.0 mi) long and flows into the Lenne as a left tributary east of Schmallenberg.

== See also ==
- List of rivers of North Rhine-Westphalia
