= Bieke (Bigge) =

River in Germany

Location
- Country: Germany
- State: North Rhine-Westphalia

Physical characteristics
- Mouth
  - location: Bigge
  - coordinates: 51.0623°N 7.8613°E

Basin features
- Progression: Bigge→ Lenne→ Ruhr→ Rhine→ North Sea

The Bieke (German pronunciation: [ˈbiːkə]) is a river of North Rhine-Westphalia, Germany. It is 4.4 km long and a right-bank tributary of the Bigge.

== See also ==
- List of rivers of North Rhine-Westphalia
