= Brachtpe =

River in Germany

Coordinates: 51.040°N 7.828°E

Location
- Country: Germany
- State: North Rhine-Westphalia

Physical characteristics
- Mouth
  - location: Bigge
- Length: 10.5 km (6.5 mi)

Basin features
- Progression: Bigge→ Lenne→ Ruhr→ Rhine→ North Sea

The Brachtpe is a river of North Rhine-Westphalia, Germany. It is a left tributary of the Bigge.

== See also ==
- List of rivers of North Rhine-Westphalia
