= Nordhelle (Ebbe Mountains) =

Mountain in North Rhine-Westphalia, Germany

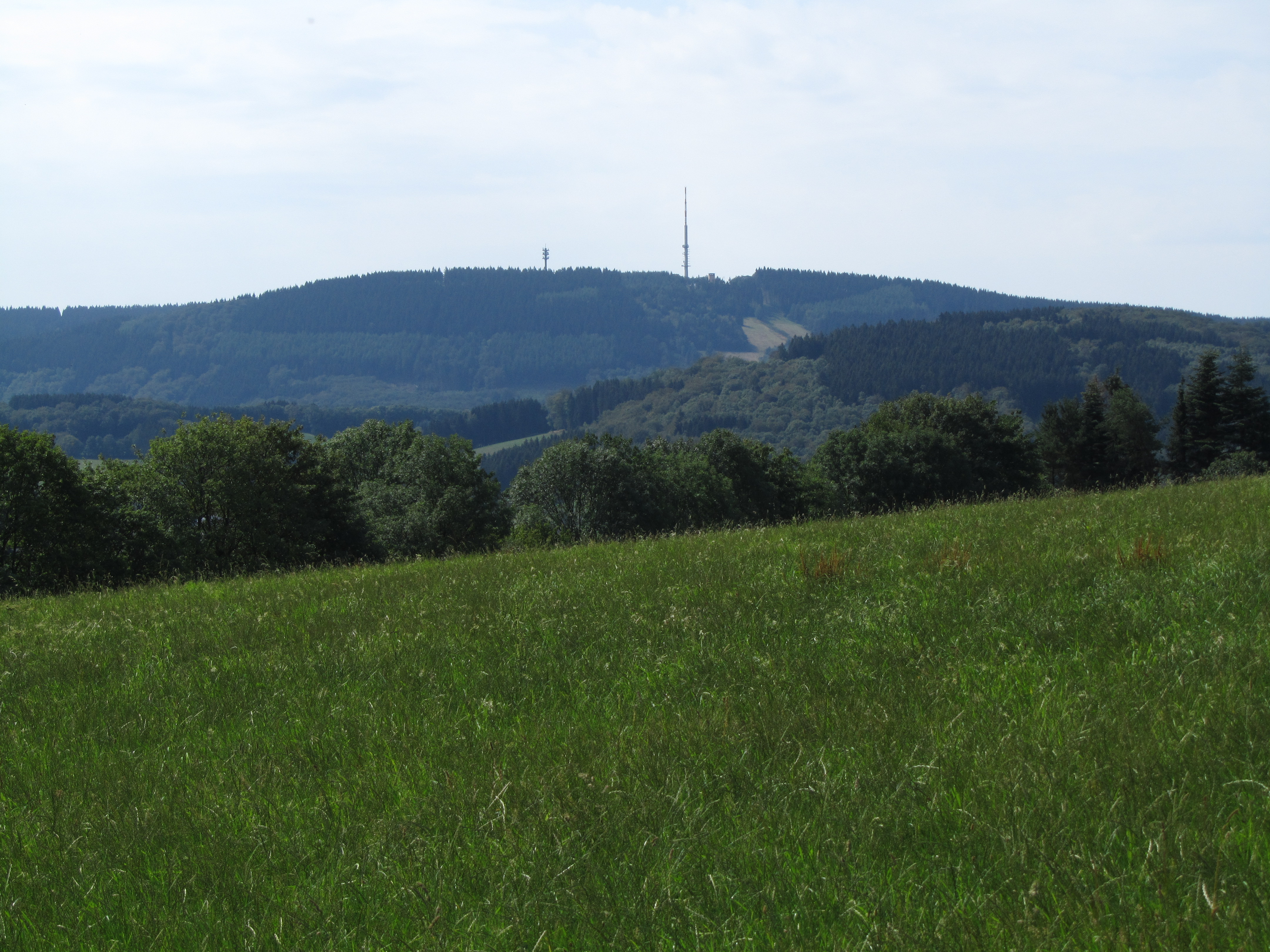
- View of the Nordhelle from Wellin looking south-southwest

Highest point
- Elevation: 662.7 m above sea level (NHN) (2,174 ft)
- Prominence: 265 m ↓ northeast of Hollenseifens
- Isolation: 28.1 km → Hoher Lehnberg (Saalhausen Hills)
- Listing: highest mountain in the Ebbe Mountains
- Coordinates: 51°08′55″N 7°45′24″E

Geography
- Location within North Rhine-Westphalia
- Location: between Reblin and Valbert; Märkischer Kreis, North Rhine-Westphalia, Germany
- Parent range: Ebbe Hills, Süderbergland

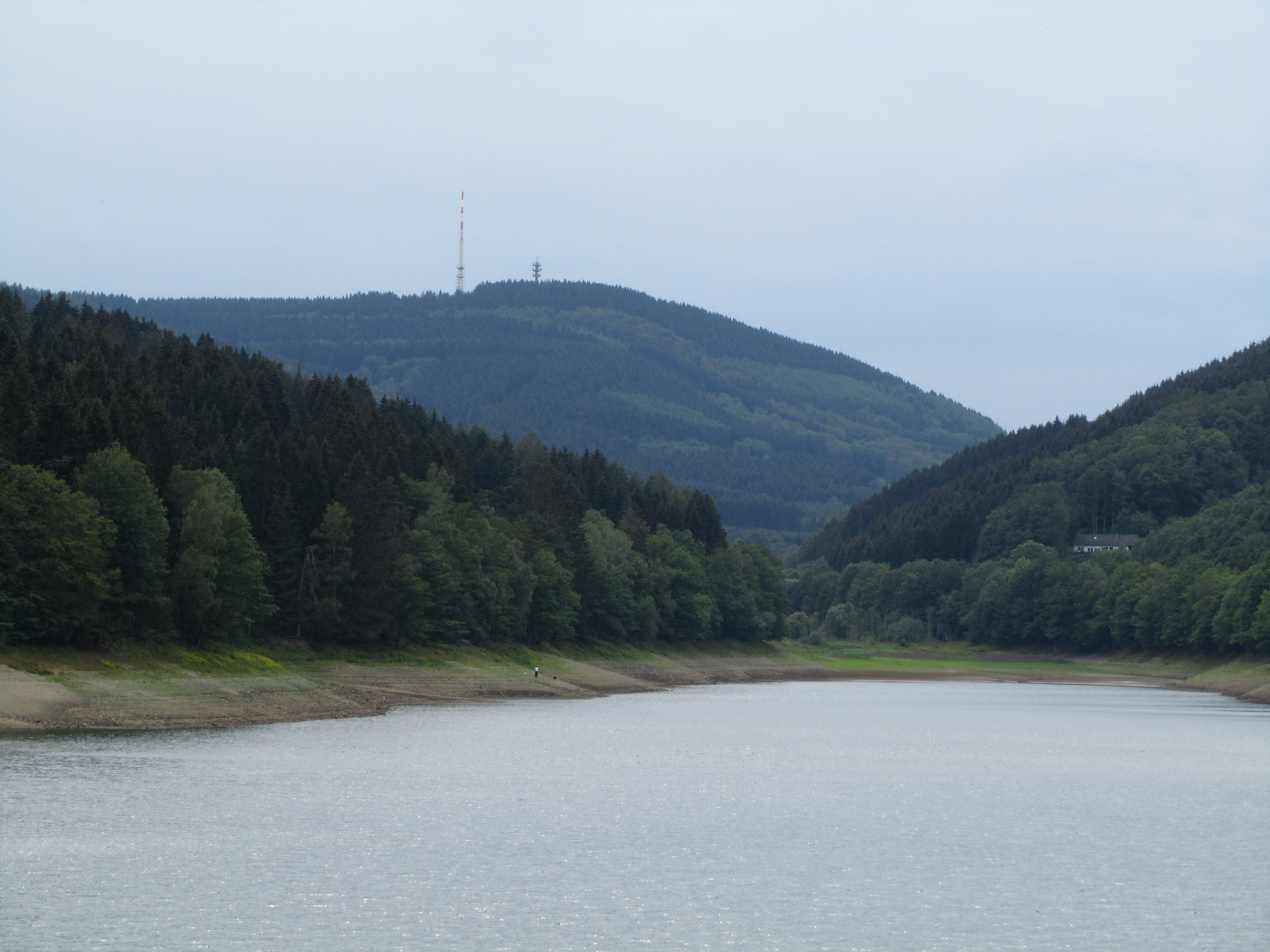
View looking west-southwest over the Oester Dam to the Nordhelle

The Nordhelle (662.7 m above sea level (NHN)) between Reblin and Valbert in the county of Märkischer Kreis in the German state of North Rhine-Westphalia is the highest peak in the Ebbe Mountains and in Märkischer Kreise. At the summit is the Nordhelle Transmitter and a viewing tower, the Robert Kolb Tower.

== Geography ==
=== Location ===
The Nordhelle rises in the western Sauerland roughly in the centre of the Ebbe highlands and within the Ebbe Mountain Nature Park – in the municipal area of Herscheid in the borough of Meinerzhagen. Its summit lies about 200 metres north of the boundary between Herscheid and its parish of Reblin to the north and Meinerzhagen with its quarter of Valbert in the south, this boundary reaching a maximum height of about 652 m. Höhe Whilst the summit area and the northern parts of the mountain belong to the municipality of Herscheid, the southern area belongs to the parish of Valbert. To the east-southeast of the Nordhelle is a subpeak, the Waldberg (ca. 638 m) and its south-southwestern neighbour is the Große Hahn (632.6 m).

=== Natural regions ===
The Nordhelle belongs to the natural regional major unit group of Süderbergland (No. 33), the major unit of the South Sauerland Highland (336_{2}), its subdivision, the Ebbe-Homert-Schwelle (336_{2}.0–3), its sub-unit, the Ebbe Mountains (336_{2}.0) and the natural region of Hohes Ebbe (336_{2}.00).

=== Rivers and streams ===
Somewhat to the northwest of the Nordhelle is the source of the Oester (Ebbebach), which passes the mountain to the north before collecting the Erlmecke – a tributary rising east of the summit where the mountain transitions to the Waldberg – near Emmeszaun (Herscheid). Roughly southwest of the Nordhelle in the transition area with the Großer Hahn rises the Ihne tributary of the Schmale Becke (Homberger Bach).

== Nature reserves ==
There are several nature reserves on or around the Nordhelle:

- Auf'm Ebbe / Ebbemoore Nature Reserve (CDDA No. 162294; established 1930; 6.664 km²), which runs up the southern flank
- Wolfsbruch Nature Reserve (CDDA No. 82939; 1930; 16.97 ha), on the eastern mountainside
- Brauke Nature Reserve (CDDA No. 318232; 1995; 9.41 ha), on the west flank
- Kammmoor Nature Reserve (CDDA No. 318628; 1995; 2.64 ha), in the southwest

Parts of the protected area of Plettenberg-Herscheid-Neuenrade (CDDA No. 555555100; 1985; 87.308 km^{2}) extend up to the summit region and the Meinerzhagen – Type A protected area (CDDA No. 555555265; 2001; 84.2604 km^{2}) runs up to its southern slopes. There is also a Special Area of Conservation, the Ebbemoore (FFH No. 4812–301; 10.69 km^{2}), on the southern slopes.

== Towers ==
=== Transmission towers ===
There are two transmission towers on the summit region of the Nordhelle: the 130-metre-high WDR tower of the Nordhelle Transmitter and, roughly 215 metres northeast of it, a Bundeswehr communication tower, which is made of reinforced concrete and used for mobile telephony. About 1.2 km east-southeast of the mountaintop on a neighbouring mountain, the Waldberg, stands the Ebbegebirge Communication Tower, which was called the Lüdenscheid Transmitter until the introduction of DVB-T.

== Gallery ==
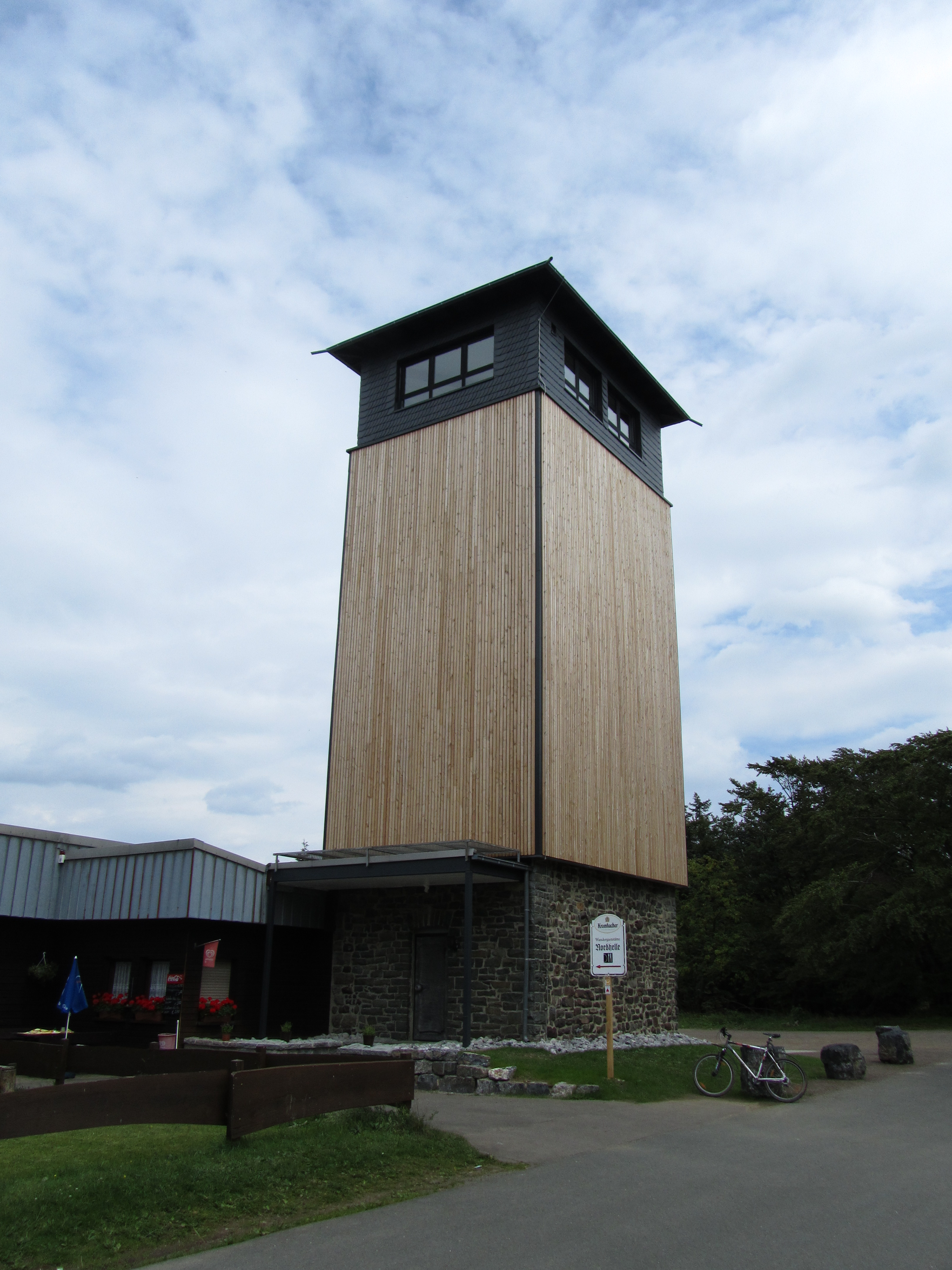
Robert Kolb Tower (observation tower)

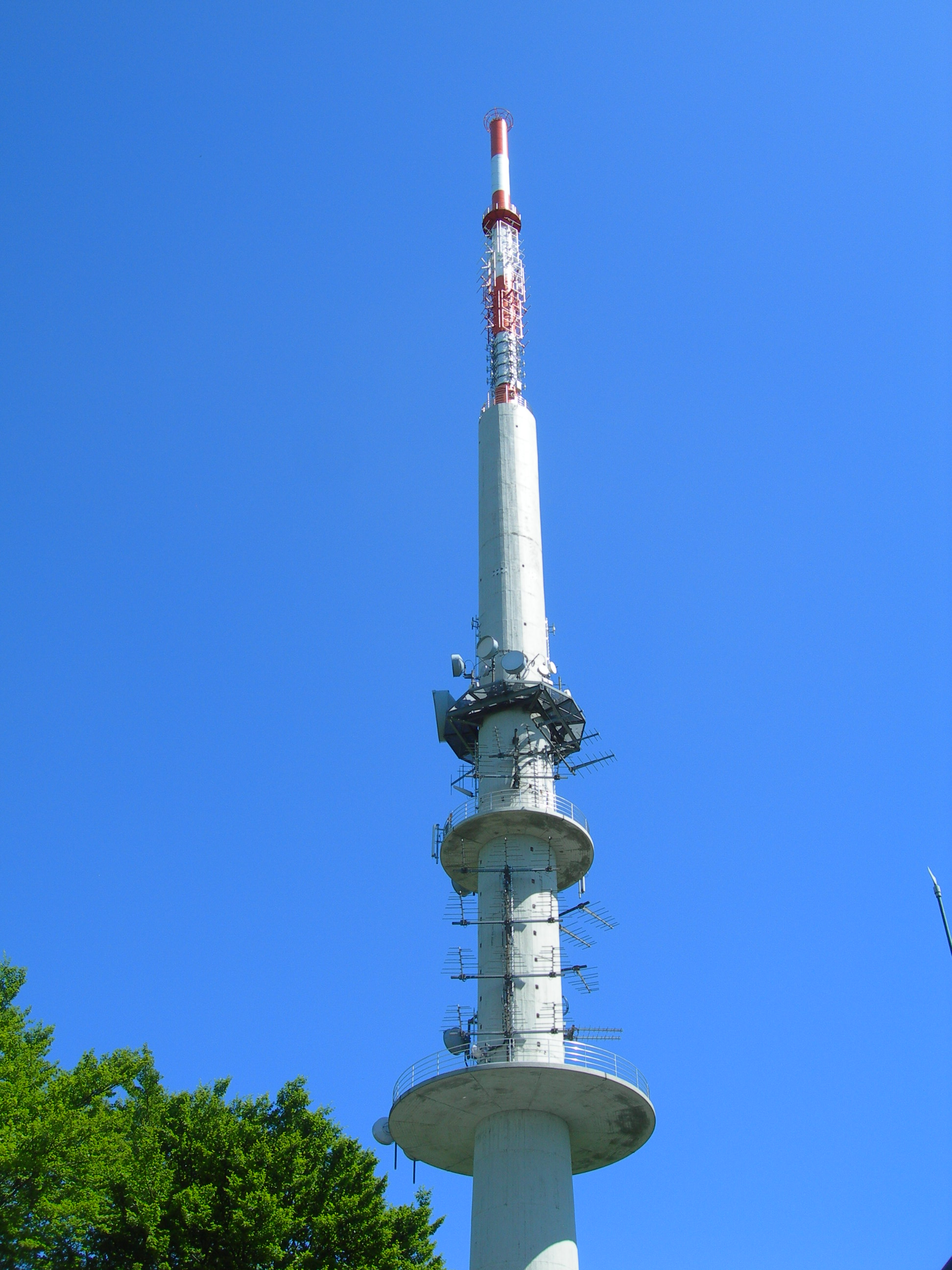
WDR-tower of the
Nordhelle Transmitter

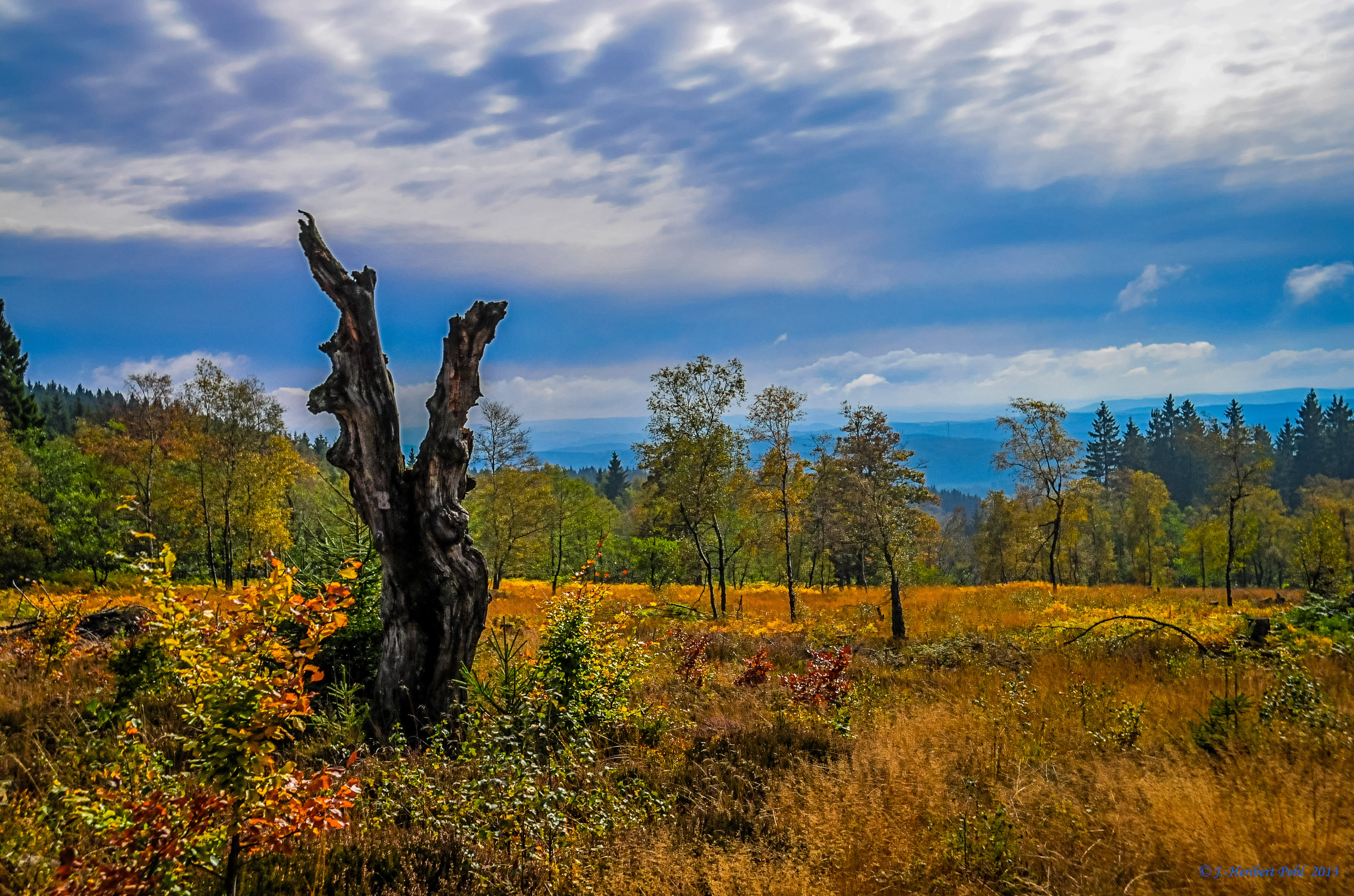
Autumn near the Nordhelle
