= Elspe =

Elspe may refer to:

- Elspe (Lennestadt), a place in Sauerland, part of Lennestadt, Germany
- Elspe (Lenne), a right tributary of the Lenne river, in Sauerland
- Elspe (Volme), a right tributary of the Volme river, also in Sauerland
