= Gleierbach (Gleierbrück) =

River in Germany

Location
- Country: Germany
- State: North Rhine-Westphalia

Physical characteristics
- Mouth
  - location: Lenne
  - coordinates: 51.1157°N 8.1408°E
- Length: 5.0 km (3.1 mi)

Basin features
- Progression: Lenne→ Ruhr→ Rhine→ North Sea

Gleierbach (also: Gleiebach) is a river in North Rhine-Westphalia, Germany. It is a tributary of the Lenne, which it joins in Gleierbrück, part of Lennestadt.

== See also ==
- List of rivers of North Rhine-Westphalia
