= Olpe (Bigge) =

River in Germany

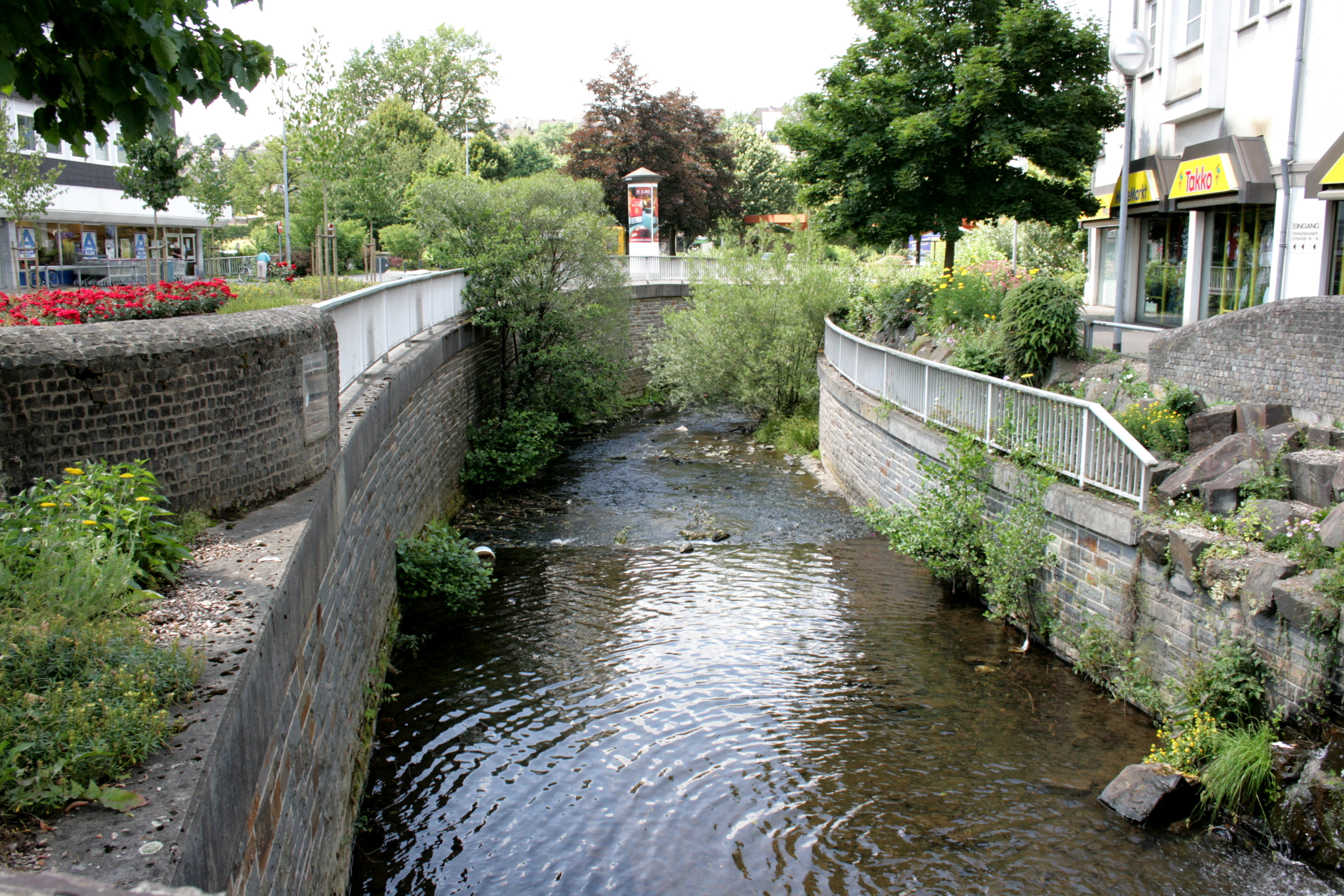

Location
- Country: Germany
- State: North Rhine-Westphalia

Physical characteristics
- Mouth
  - location: Bigge
  - coordinates: 51.0278°N 7.8424°E
- Length: 10.3 km (6.4 mi)

Basin features
- Progression: Bigge→ Lenne→ Ruhr→ Rhine→ North Sea

Olpe (German pronunciation: [ˈɔlpə]) is a river of North Rhine-Westphalia, Germany. It is a right tributary of the Bigge, which it joins in the town Olpe.

== See also ==
- List of rivers of North Rhine-Westphalia
