= Marc Hoffmann (sex offender) =

German sex offender and murderer

- Born: 1 August 1973 (age 53); Plettenberg, West Germany
- Conviction: Murder
- Penalty: Life imprisonment

Details
- Victims: 2+
- Span of crimes: 6 May – 30 October 2004
- Country: Germany
- Date apprehended: 8 December 2004

Marc Hoffmann (born 1 August 1973) is a German sex offender and murderer. In 2005 Hoffmann was sentenced to life imprisonment for the sexual abuse and murder of two children that took place in 2004. He may be responsible for other unresolved sexual offences and murders.

== Early life ==
Marc Hoffmann was born in Plettenberg in the Sauerland. His father was a former sailor and his mother worked as a nurse. He grew up as an only child until his family relocated to the small village of Nuttmecke near Attendorn in 1980, where the family lived in a shared home with the boy's grandparents.

Hoffmann was teased at school by other children for his weight, bow-legs and speech disorder. This rendered him an outsider among his peers. After completing elementary school, Hoffmann attended secondary school. As his academic achievements were below average, he had to repeat a grade in both elementary and secondary school. At the age of 16, Hoffmann dropped out of secondary school after completing the eighth grade.

Hoffmann was unemployed for three years after leaving school, and from 1992 on he worked as a warden at a construction yard for eleven months. Hoffmann increasingly began to spend his spare time playing first-person shooters, at this time also developing a fondness for violence and horror films. Hoffmann soon discovered his sexually sadistic tendencies and began to torment and kill frogs and mice that he himself caught.

In 1993, Hoffmann completed his military service with the Bundeswehr. He then returned to Nuttmecke, where he was temporarily active in the local Neo-Nazi scene, but only remained a Mitläufer. At the age of 20, he had a relationship with a young woman from a neighbouring town, with whom he had a daughter in 1994.

Rape charge

In February 1994, Hoffmann was charged with the rape of a 17-year-old hitchhiker in a remote forest. He only received two years of probation, as he had no previous convictions and was considered to have a "positive social prognosis" by the court. His girlfriend, however, separated from him as a result.

Jobs and marriage

In 1995, Hoffmann moved from Nuttmecke to Bremerhaven together with his parents, grandparents and daughter. Shortly after, however, his father died of Creutzfeldt-Jakob disease. After his father's death, Hoffmann began training to become a plumber, but dropped out after failing the final exam twice. He then began working for the German Red Cross as a paramedic at major events for five years, and met his future wife, whom he soon married.

From 2000 on Hoffmann worked for a security company in Bremerhaven, where he regulated bus tickets. During this time, he was again accused of raping a 17-year-old, whom he had met while working. This trial was discontinued due to a lack of evidence.

In 2002, his wife gave birth to a daughter. The marriage was in crisis because his wife suspected him of unfaithfulness. Hoffmann had a passion for driving aimlessly over long distances, presumably to relieve emotional tensions. Therefore, his wife began to increasingly complain about the high monthly spending on gasoline. She also suspected her husband of regularly visiting Bremerhaven's "baby street".

In June 2003, Hoffmann lost his job with the security company and was unemployed from then on, leading to an increase in his aimless drives. His wife separated from him in the spring of 2004 and moved out of the apartment with their daughter, while Hoffmann stayed there with his older daughter.

== Murders ==
On 6 May 2004, Hoffmann was driving in the Cuxhaven district of Altenwalde when he saw the 8-year-old Levke S. waiting outside of her parents' house. He lured the girl into his car and carried her to a wooded area where he sexually abused the child and then strangled her with a zip tie. After the murder, Hoffmann dumped the body several times in different locations before settling for the immediate vicinity of his hometown. The skeletonized body of Levke was discovered in late August 2004 by a mushroom collector. Undeterred by the massive manhunt for Levke's murderer, Hoffmann apparently continued the search for new victims. On 30 October 2004, during one of his aimless tours, he met 8-year-old Felix W. from Ebersdorf, Rotenburg, who was riding his bicycle. Similar to Levke, Hoffmann lured the boy into his car and drove to a nearby forest. After waiting for the onset of darkness, Hoffmann abused and then strangled the boy with his bare hands, throwing the body into the Geeste at Bremerhaven. The corpse was found on 7 January 2005, after a note from Hoffmann, who had been arrested, surfaced. Divers found the body "tied up as a package" in the river.

== Arrest, trial and sentencing ==
Hoffmann was arrested on the evening of 8 December 2004 in connection with the murders of Levke S. and Felix W.. On the same day, he confessed to the murder of Levke. On 7 January 2005, he also confessed to Felix's murder to his lawyers. On 9 May 2005, a lawsuit against Hoffmann was opened in the Stade district court.

The family of Levke appeared in the trial as co-plaintiffs. Hoffmann remained silent during the whole process, and all statements on his part were read by his lawyers.

On 29 June 2005, the Stade County Court sentenced Hoffmann to life imprisonment for the sexual abuse and murder of the two children. In addition, a particular severity of the crimes was noted by the court, for which Hoffmann was also sentenced to preventative detention. Thus, it is possible that Hoffmann may never leave prison again.

The chairman of the assizes, Berend Appelkamp, found the verdict justified as Hoffmann had "inflicted unimaginable suffering" on others. Hoffmann accepted the verdict without apparent emotion.

Hoffmann is currently serving his life sentence in the Oldenburg prison.

=== Criticism of the police ===
After Hoffmann's capture, investigating authorities in the murder cases of Levke and Felix were accused of ignoring evidence. Seven weeks before Felix's murder, evidence of Hoffmann's alleged offenses in the Levke case became available. However, corresponding testimonies were viewed as insufficient, and the police continued to reject such claims.

In May 2010, the former special commissioner in the Levke case, Günter König-Kruse, admitted to the Nordsee-Zeitung that on June 13, 16, and 29 Hoffmann had returned to the parking lot where he had thrown away Levke's satchel and jacket. He was captured on CCTV, around four months before Felix's disappearance. However, the recordings did not reach a police file until November 29, around three weeks after Felix's death. In addition, a woman who was a longtime acquaintance of Hoffmann's family had suspected Hoffmann of committing the murders. The woman was aware of Hoffmann's previous rape charge, and reported her suspicions to the police in early September 2004, over a month before Felix's murder took place. However, she did not hear anything from the police until 24 November.

== Pathology ==
Contemporary acquaintances considered Hoffmann a "mother's boy", while Hoffmann's mother was described as someone who should have taken better care of their son. Hoffmann was described as an intelligent "grobian" (boorish individual) with little empathy, as well as "friendly and helpful" but also dominated by his mother. In regard to his sexual experiences, Hoffmann was regarded as a "late bloomer", especially since in his teens, unlike his peers, he was hardly able to establish ties to the opposite sex. The fact that Hoffmann was born with only one testicle was likely a major reason for his inhibitions. As a result, he increasingly consumed pornography as a teenager.

The police considered Hoffmann an unusual offender, as he had targeted both young boys and girls. In the course of his psychiatric exam, Hoffmann was classified as "not mentally ill" and therefore could not plead the insanity defence. According to these reports, Hoffmann was neither sadistic nor a paedophile, but showed a "massive lack of emotion and compassion" and saw his victims as sacrifices.

== Links to other crimes ==
Hoffmann remains a suspect in the murder of 10-year-old Adelina in Bremen in June 2001. Hoffmann was questioned and pressured to confess by the beamters to the girl's murder in September 2005, but to this day he denies involvement. However, he allegedly confessed to the murder to a cellmate.

Hoffmann allegedly confessed to six more sexually motivated murders to his cellmate. According to media reports, this supposedly refers to two children killed in East Germany, two hitchhikers, and two older women. Hoffmann later claimed to have lied.

Hoffmann was a suspect in the murder of 8-year-old Johanna Bohnacker from Hesse, whose body was found on 1 April 2000 after she had gone missing seven months earlier. On 26 October 2017, the police announced that paedophile Rick J. had been arrested for the girl's murder, eliminating Hoffmann as a suspect.

During his remand, Hoffmann allegedly hinted to officials about the murder of an old woman in his home village. Because an 86-year-old woman had disappeared there in 1994, Hoffmann is considered a suspect in her case.

Hoffmann was also increasingly associated with the so-called Schullandheim murders, which remained unexplained for a long time. These, however, were eventually attributed to sex offender Martin Ney.

While imprisoned in the Oldenburg prison, Hoffmann allegedly confessed to an informant that he had raped two women.

== See also ==
- List of German serial killers
