= Markus Dworrak =

German footballer (born 1978)

Personal information
- Date of birth: 23 January 1978 (age 48)
- Place of birth: Plettenberg, West Germany
- Height: 1.84 m (6 ft 0 in)
- Position: Midfielder

Youth career
- –1992: SV Oestertal
- 1992–1997: RSV Meinerzhagen
- 1997–1998: Rot-Weiß Lüdenscheid

Senior career*
Years	Team	Apps	(Gls)
1998–2001	1. FC Köln (A)		
1999–2004	1. FC Köln	18	(0)
2001–2002	→ Greuther Fürth (loan)	20	(4)
2004–2005	Mainz 05	12	(1)
2005	Rot-Weiß Erfurt	9	(3)
2005–2006	Energie Cottbus	13	(1)
2006–2007	Dynamo Dresden	21	(1)
2007–2008	FV Engers 07	7	(0)
2008–2009	Germania Dattenfeld	3	(0)
- * Club domestic league appearances and goals

Markus Dworrak (born 23 January 1978) is a German former professional footballer who played as a midfielder.

== Career ==
Dworrak began his professional career with 1. FC Köln.
