= Nette (Lenne) =

River in Germany

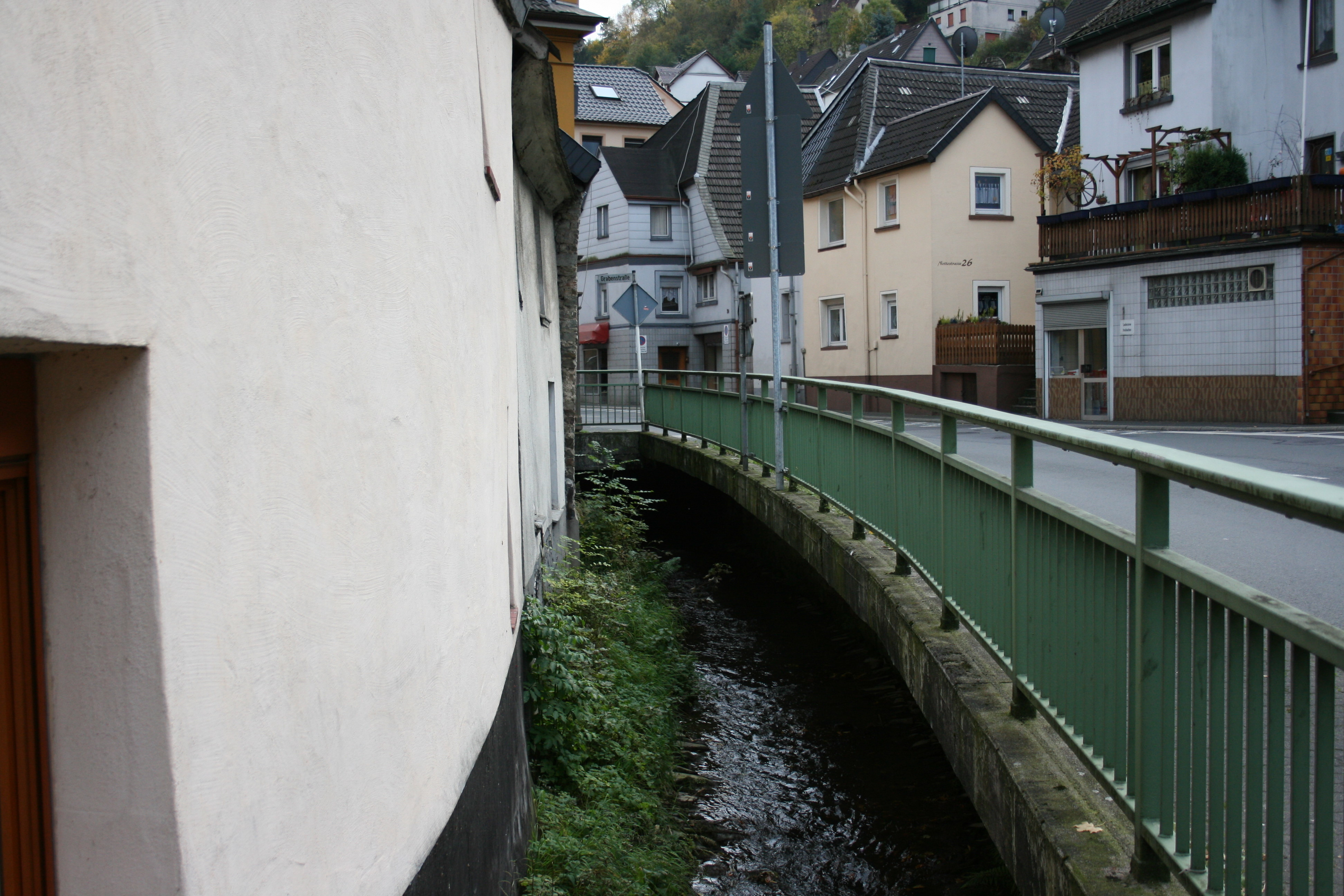

Location
- Country: Germany
- State: North Rhine-Westphalia

Physical characteristics
- Mouth
  - location: Lenne
  - coordinates: 51.3014°N 7.6711°E
- Length: 8.0 km (5.0 mi)

Basin features
- Progression: Lenne→ Ruhr→ Rhine→ North Sea

Nette (German pronunciation: [ˈnɛtə]) is a river of North Rhine-Westphalia, Germany. It is a right tributary of the Lenne.

== See also ==
- List of rivers of North Rhine-Westphalia
