= Verse (river) =

River of North Rhine-Westphalia, Germany

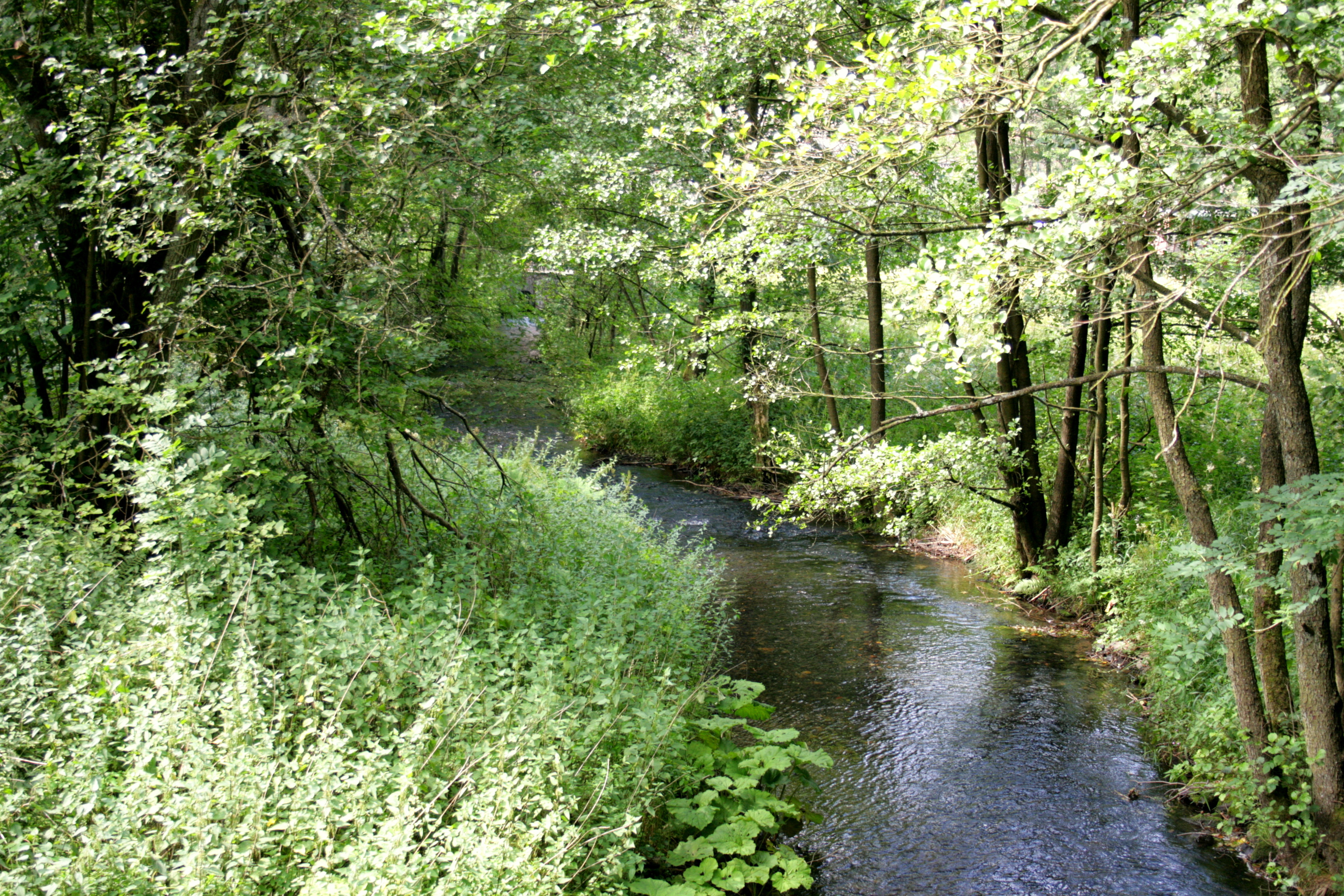

Location
- Country: Germany
- State: North Rhine-Westphalia

Physical characteristics
- Mouth
  - location: Lenne
  - coordinates: 51.2516°N 7.7687°E
- Length: 24.5 km (15.2 mi)

Basin features
- Progression: Lenne→ Ruhr→ Rhine→ North Sea

Verse is a river of North Rhine-Westphalia, Germany. It flows into the Lenne near Werdohl.

== See also ==
- List of rivers of North Rhine-Westphalia
