= Rolf Steininger =

German historian (born 1942)

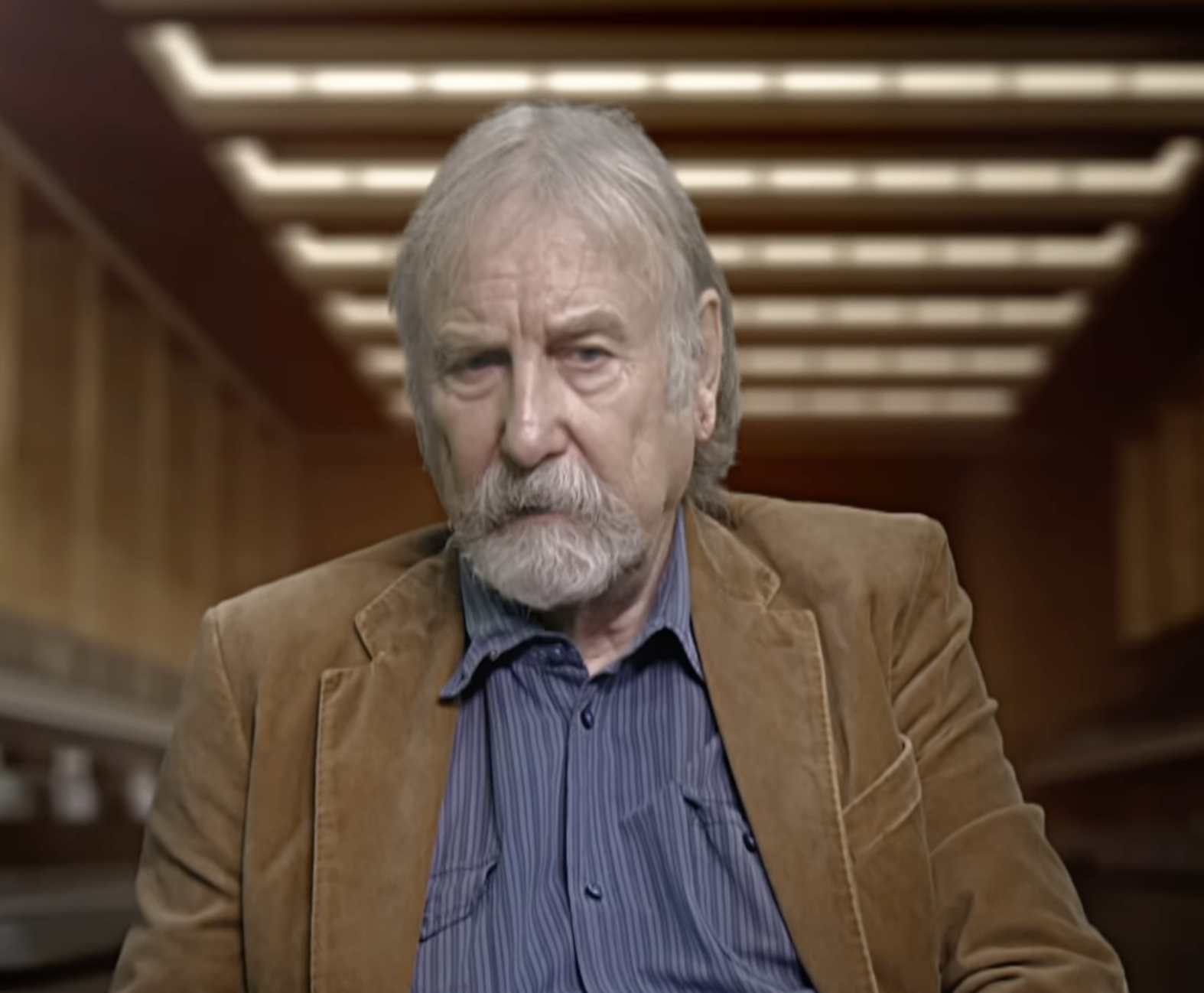
Rolf Steininger

Rolf Steininger (August 2, 1942, Plettenberg) is a German historian and former university professor for contemporary history.

Steininger studied English language and literature and history at Marburg University, the University of Göttingen, LMU Munich, Lancaster University, and Cardiff University. He received a doctor's degree in 1971 and habilitated at Leibniz University Hannover in 1976. In 1980, he became a professor at Leibniz University Hannover. In 1983, he was appointed to a professorship at the University of Innsbruck.

From 1984, Steininger has led the Institute for Contemporary History in Innsbruck. His work concentrates in particular on the history of Post-War Germany, Austria and South Tyrol.

From 1995, Steininger has held a Jean Monnet chair, and is Senior Fellow of the Eisenhower Center for American Studies at the University of New Orleans and member of the executive committee of the European Community Studies Association. He was visiting professor at Vietnam National University, Hanoi, Saigon University, and the University of Cape Town.
