= Nesselbach (Lenne) =

River in Germany

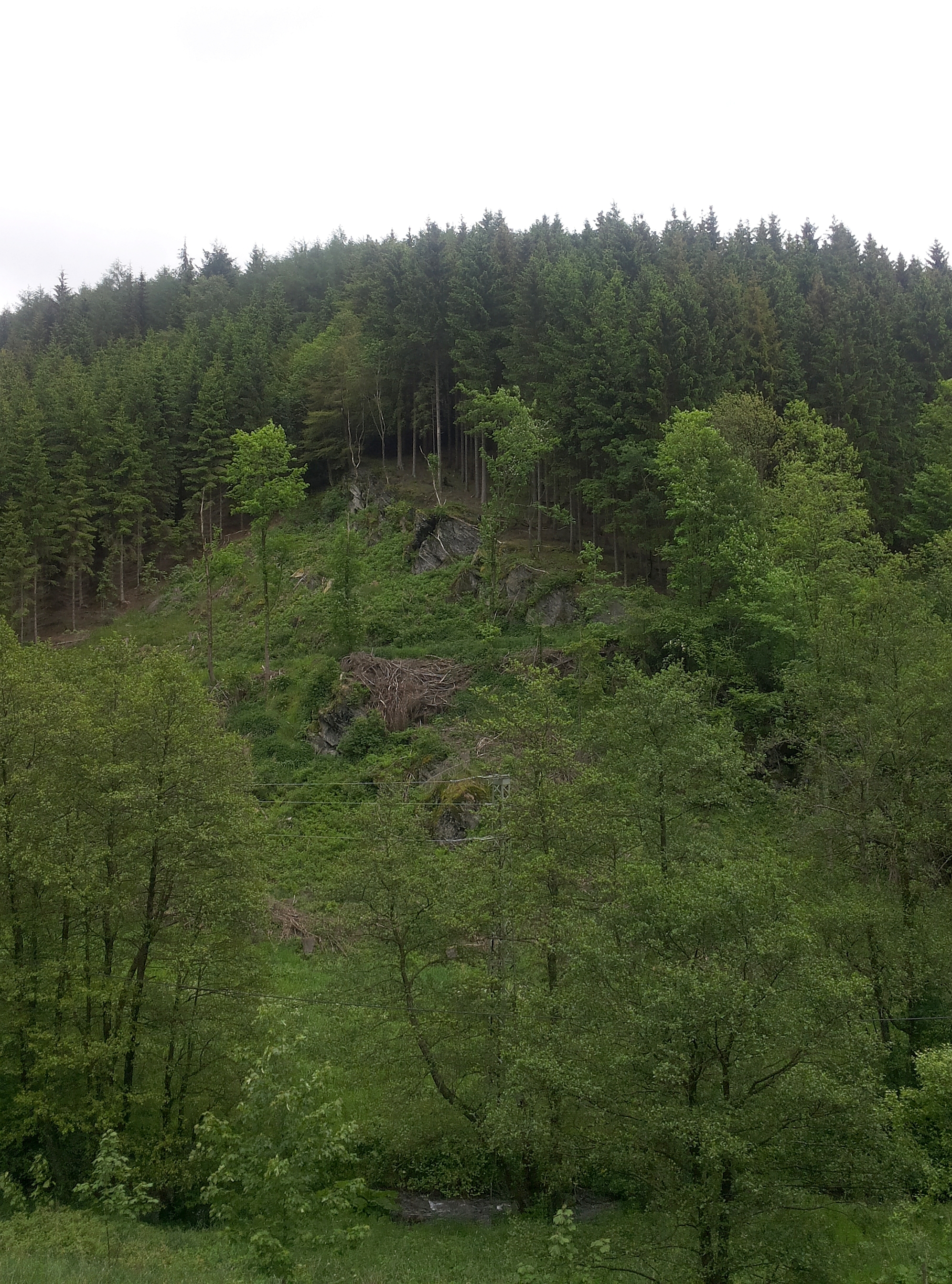

Location
- Country: Germany
- State: North Rhine-Westphalia

Physical characteristics
- Mouth
  - location: Lenne
  - coordinates: 51.1670°N 8.3943°E
- Length: 7.4 km (4.6 mi)

Basin features
- Progression: Lenne→ Ruhr→ Rhine→ North Sea

Nesselbach is a river of North Rhine-Westphalia, Germany. It is a right tributary of the Lenne.

== See also ==
- List of rivers of North Rhine-Westphalia
