= Uentrop (Lenne) =

River in Germany

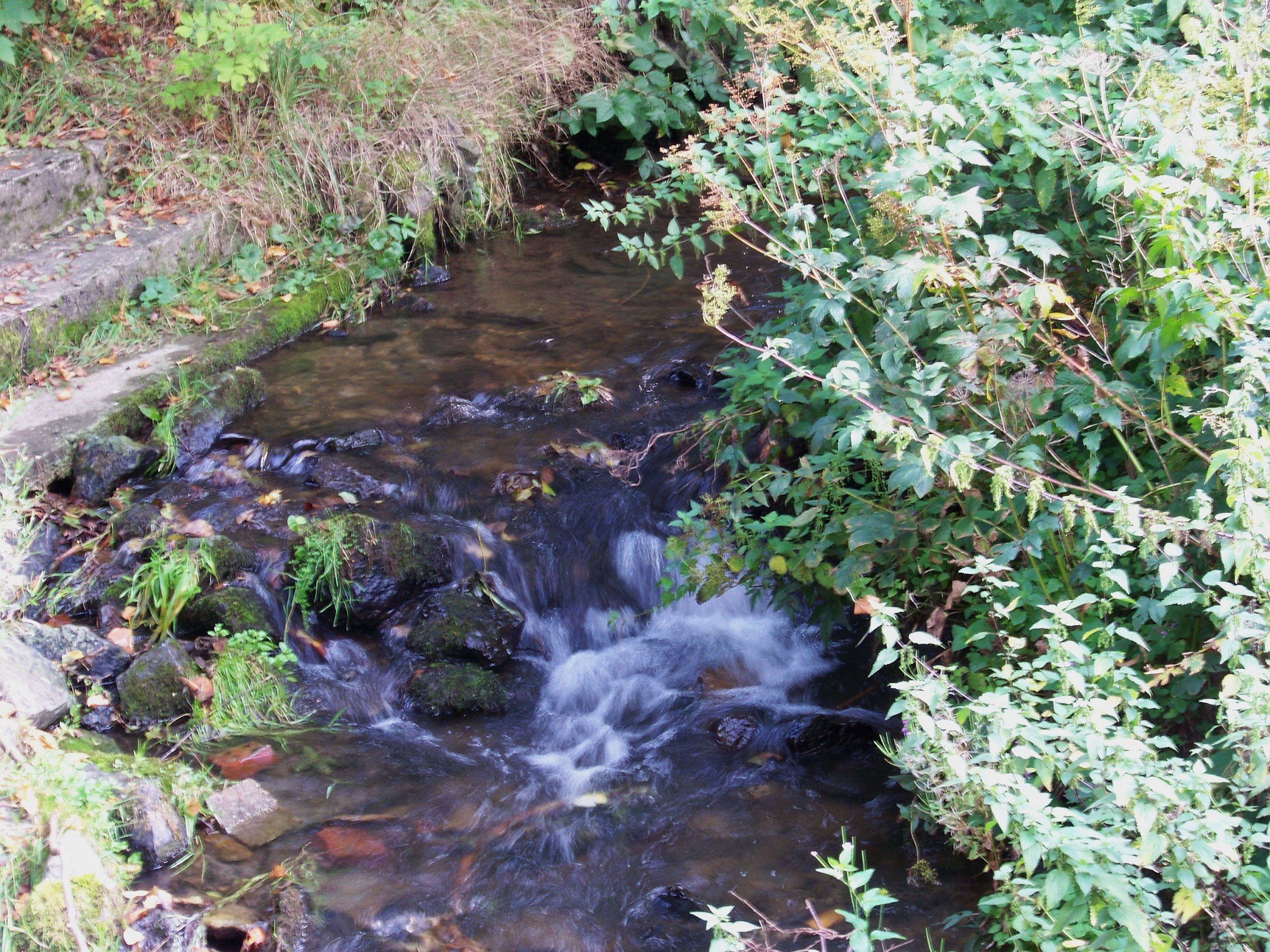

Location
- Country: Germany
- State: North Rhine-Westphalia

Physical characteristics
- Mouth
  - location: Lenne
  - coordinates: 51.1331°N 8.2206°E

Basin features
- Progression: Lenne→ Ruhr→ Rhine→ North Sea

Uentrop is a river of North Rhine-Westphalia, Germany. It is 5.8 km (3.6 mi) long and is a left tributary of the Lenne.

== See also ==
- List of rivers of North Rhine-Westphalia
