= Ihne =

River in Germany

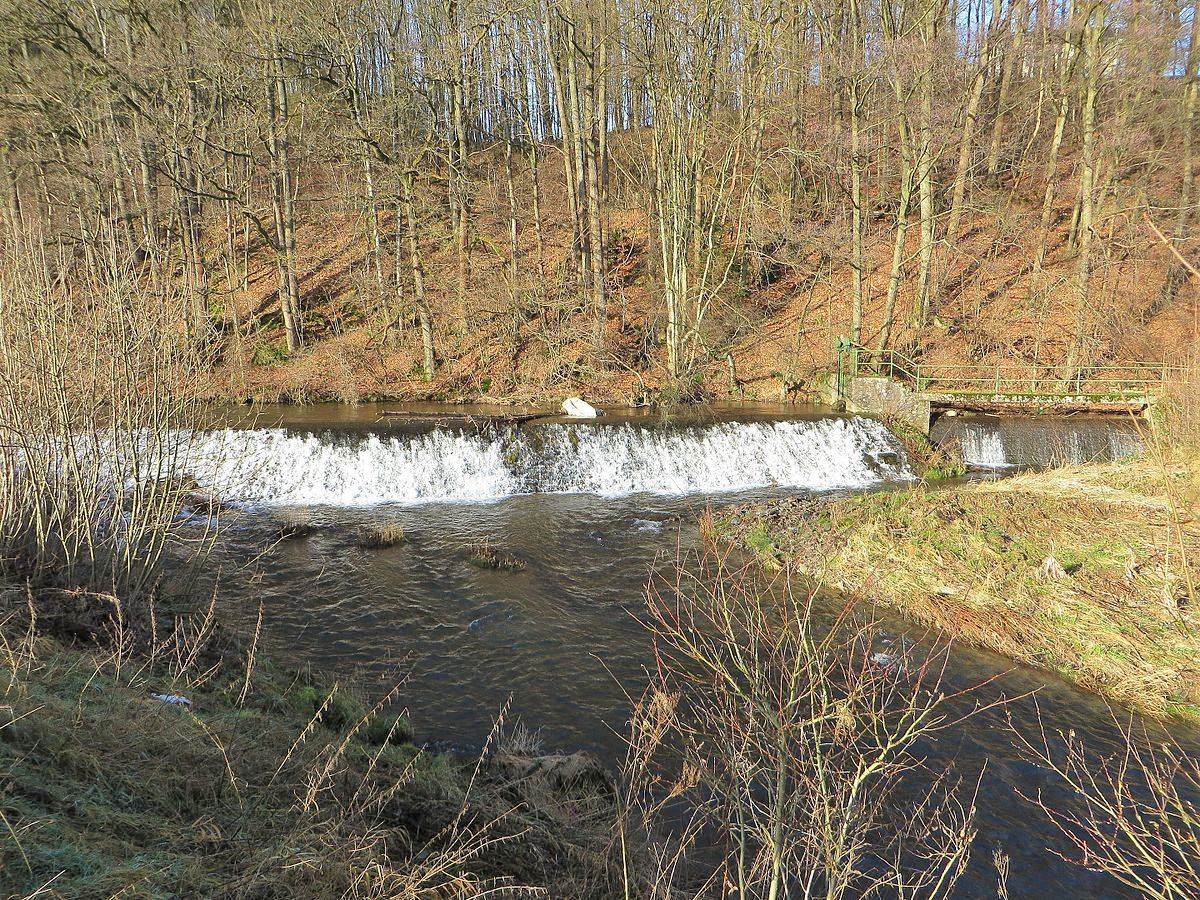

Location
- Country: Germany
- State: North Rhine-Westphalia

Physical characteristics
- Mouth
  - location: Bigge
  - coordinates: 51.1169°N 7.8936°E
- Length: 12.2 km (7.6 mi)

Basin features
- Progression: Bigge→ Lenne→ Ruhr→ Rhine→ North Sea

Ihne (German pronunciation: [ˈiːnə]) is a river of North Rhine-Westphalia, Germany. It is a tributary of the Bigge.

== See also ==
- List of rivers of North Rhine-Westphalia
