= Elspe (Lenne) =

River in Germany

Location
- Country: Germany
- State: North Rhine-Westphalia

Physical characteristics
- Mouth
  - location: Lenne
  - coordinates: 51.1444°N 8.0213°E
- Length: 12.0 km (7.5 mi)

Basin features
- Progression: Lenne→ Ruhr→ Rhine→ North Sea

The Elspe (also: Elspebach) is a river of North Rhine-Westphalia, Germany. It flows into the Lenne in Grevenbrück.

== See also ==
- List of rivers of North Rhine-Westphalia
