= Else (Lenne) =

River in Germany

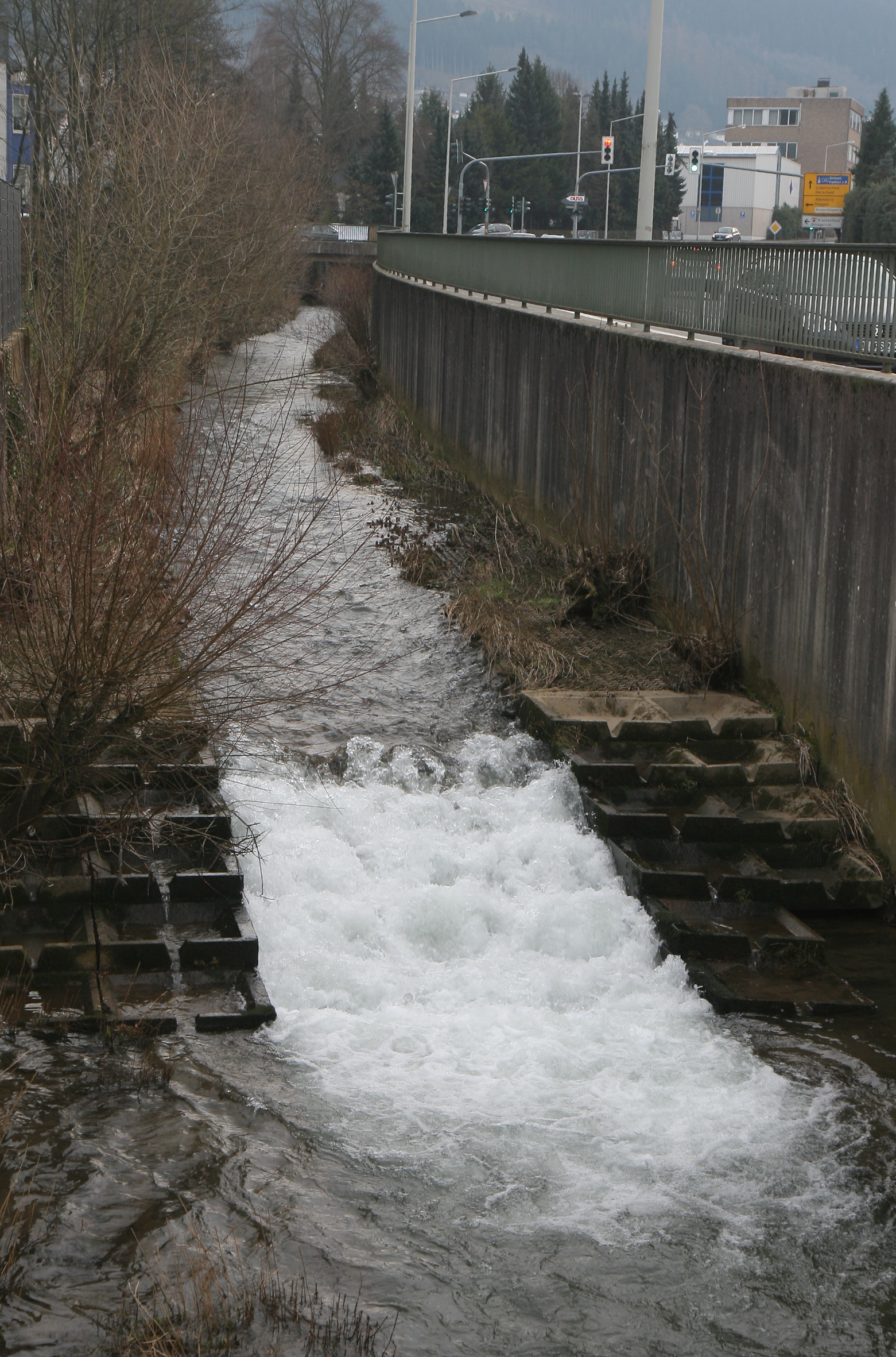

Location
- Country: Germany
- State: North Rhine-Westphalia

Physical characteristics
- Mouth
  - location: Lenne
  - coordinates: 51.2289°N 7.8689°E
- Length: 12.9 km (8.0 mi)

Basin features
- Progression: Lenne→ Ruhr→ Rhine→ North Sea

Else (German pronunciation: [ˈɛlzə]) is a 12.9 km river in Märkischer Kreis, North Rhine-Westphalia, Germany. It is a left tributary of the Lenne. The Else rises about 800m north of Herscheid to an altitude of 414m above sea level. As it flows to the east, the stream reaches the area of the Plettenberg-Hüinghausen airfield and passes the village of Hüinghausen on its southern edge. It then proceeds through Plettenberg, before joining up with the Lenne. There is a height difference of 214m between the source and the mouth, which corresponds to a mean gradient of 16.6%.

== See also ==
- List of rivers of North Rhine-Westphalia
