= Grafschaft (Lenne) =

River in Germany

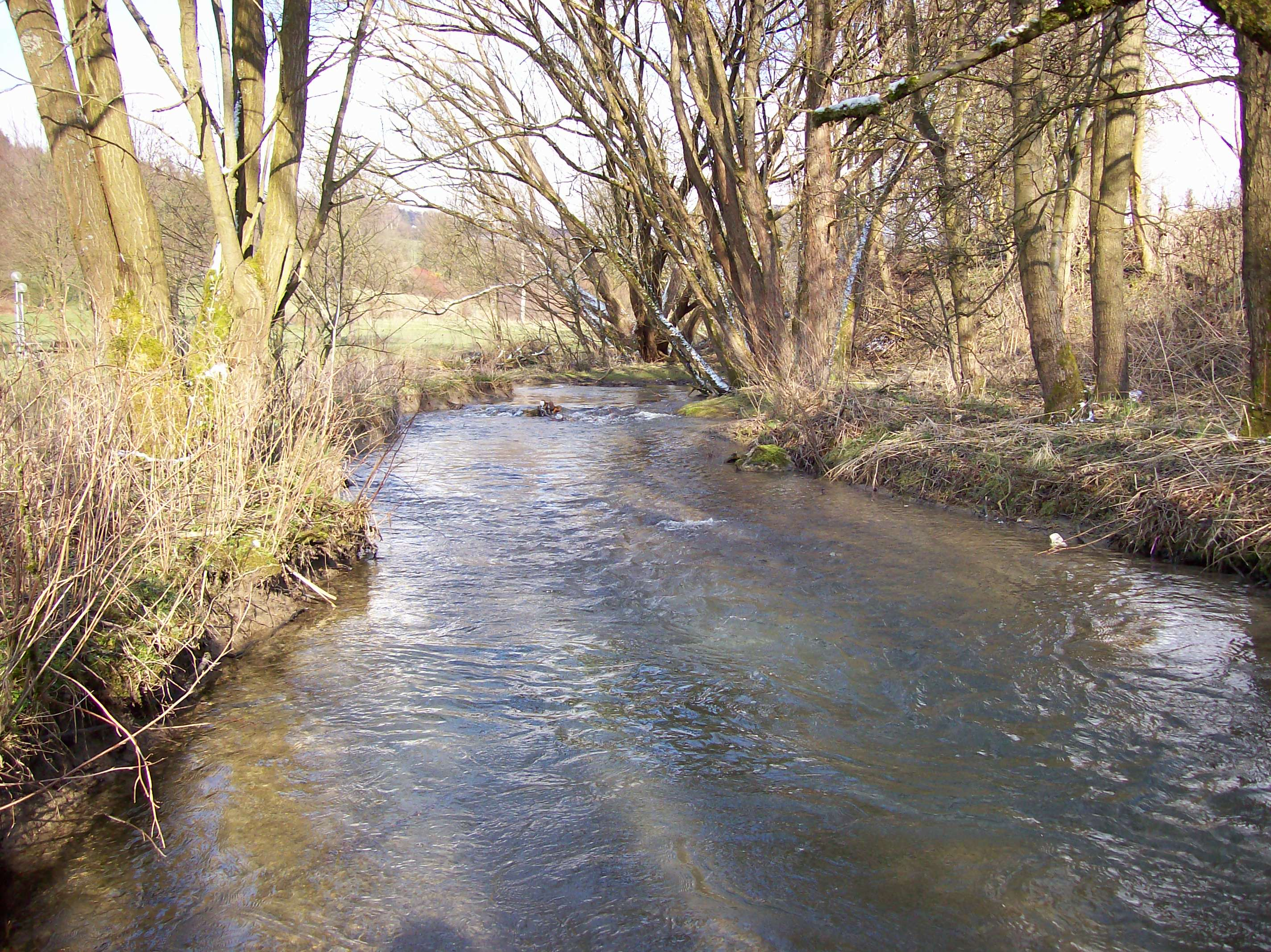
- Grafschaft in Schmallenberg

Location
- Country: Germany
- State: North Rhine-Westphalia

Physical characteristics
- Mouth
  - location: Lenne
  - coordinates: 51.1437°N 8.2876°E
- Length: 6.3 km (3.9 mi)

Basin features
- Progression: Lenne→ Ruhr→ Rhine→ North Sea

Grafschaft is a river of North Rhine-Westphalia, Germany. It is a left tributary of the Lenne.

== See also ==
- List of rivers of North Rhine-Westphalia
