= Bigge (river) =

River in Germany

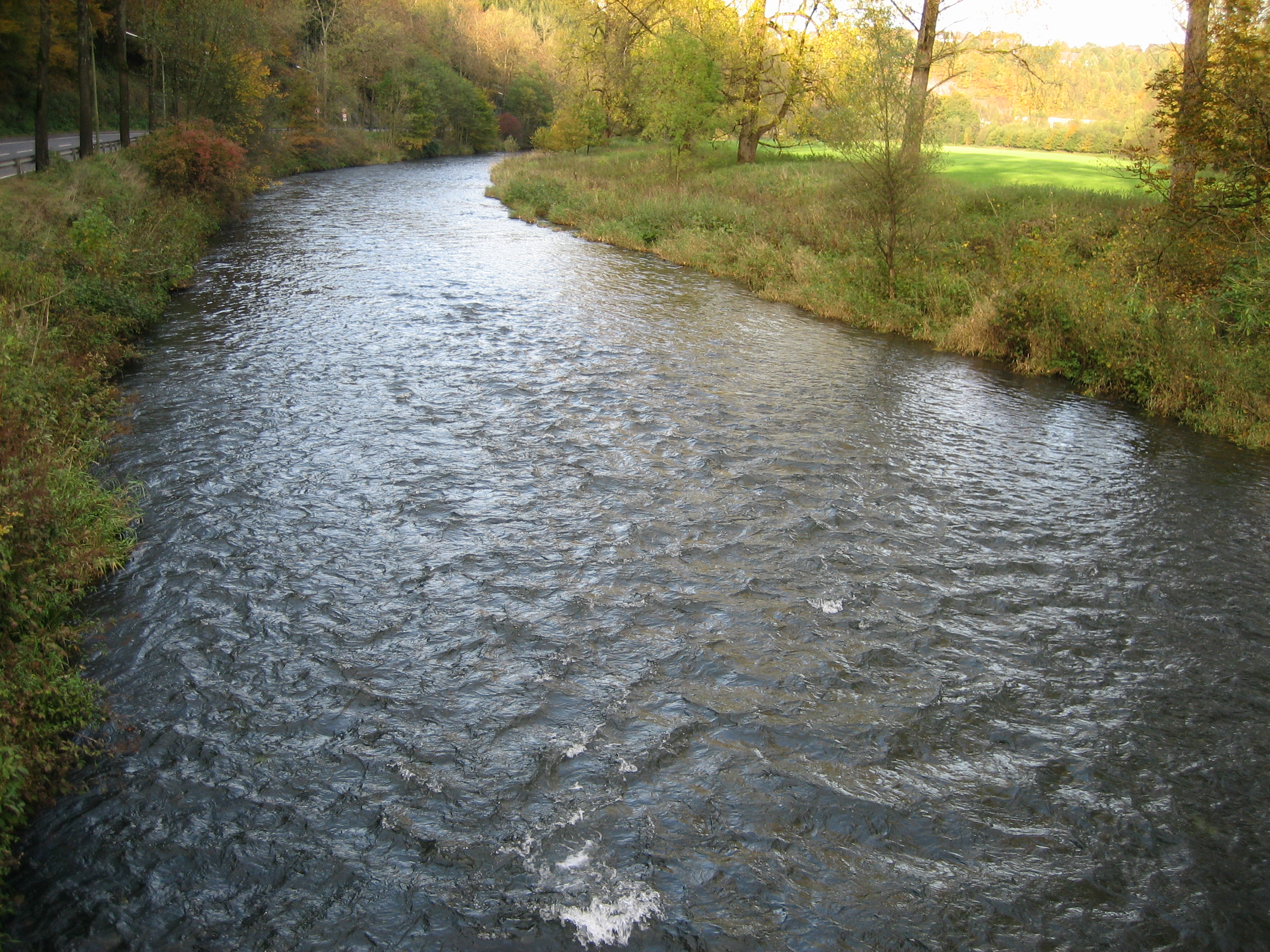
- Bigge river near Altfinnentrop shortly before its confluence with the Lenne

Location
- Country: Germany
- State: North Rhine-Westphalia

Physical characteristics
- Source
  - location: Römershagen, Wenden
  - coordinates: 50°55′49″N 7°50′16″E
  - elevation: 427 m (1,401 ft)
- Mouth
  - location: Lenne in Finnentrop
  - coordinates: 51°10′9″N 7°57′49″E
  - elevation: 232 m (761 ft)
- Length: 44.5 km (27.7 mi)
- Basin size: 369 km^{2} (142 sq mi)

Basin features
- Progression: Lenne→ Ruhr→ Rhine→ North Sea

The Bigge (German pronunciation: [ˈbɪɡə]) is a river of North Rhine-Westphalia, Germany. It flows into the left bank of Lenne in Finnentrop.

== See also ==
- List of rivers of North Rhine-Westphalia
