= Lenne =

River in Germany

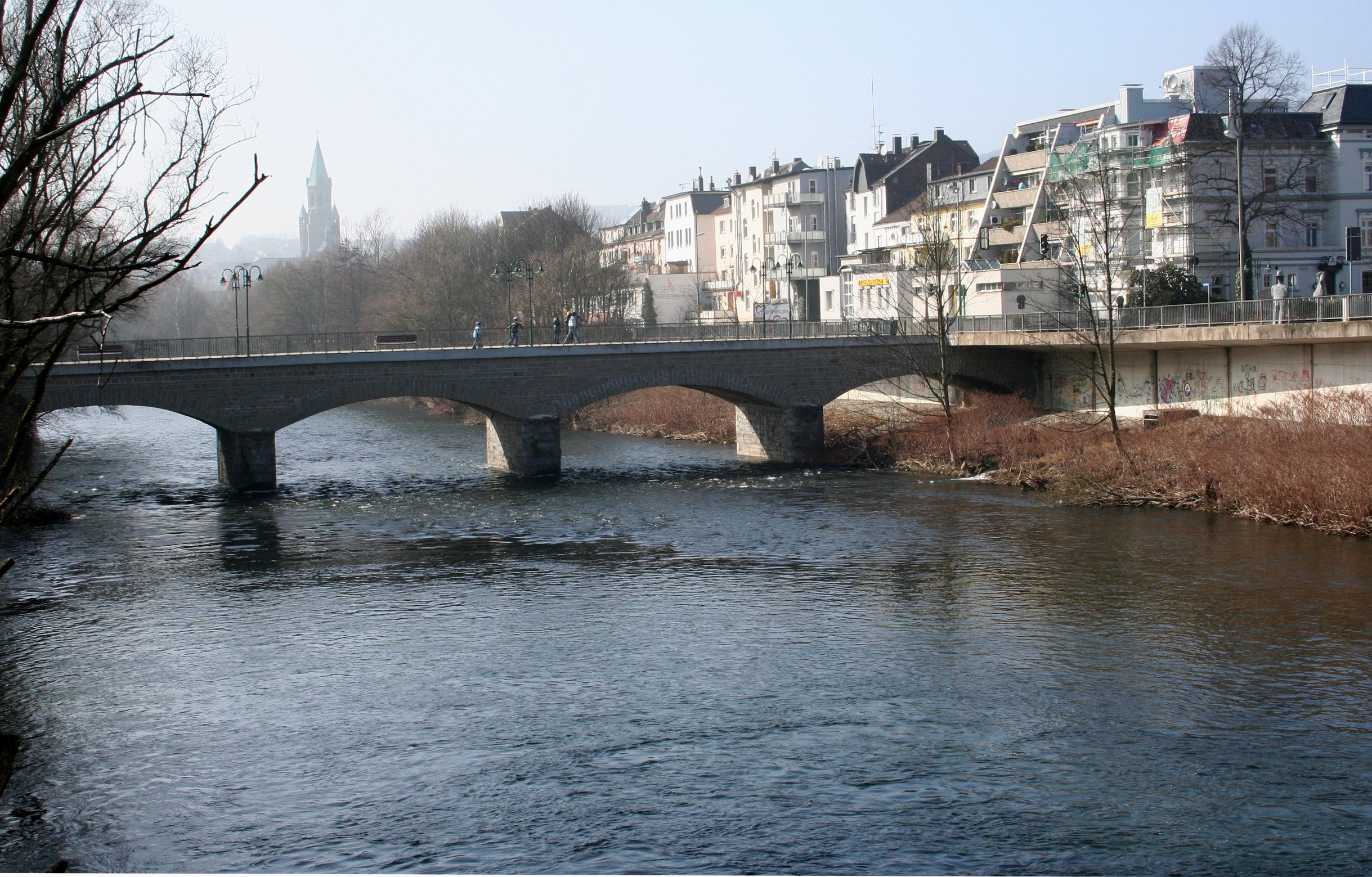
- The Lenne in Iserlohn-Letmathe.

Location
- Country: Germany

Physical characteristics
- Source
  - location: Sauerland
  - elevation: 819 m (2,687 ft)
- Mouth
  - location: Ruhr
  - coordinates: 51°24′54″N 7°29′31″E
- Length: 129.0 km (80.2 mi)
- Basin size: 1,355 km^{2} (523 sq mi)
- Discharge
  - average: 25 m^{3}/s (880 cu ft/s)

Basin features
- Progression: Ruhr→ Rhine→ North Sea
- Tributaries
  - left: Else (Lenne), Bigge (river), Elspe (Lenne), Grafschaft (Lenne), Uentrop (Lenne)
  - right: Nesselbach (Lenne), Nette (Lenne), Sorpe (Lenne)

The Lenne (German pronunciation: [ˈlɛnə]) is a tributary of the river Ruhr in the Sauerland hills, western Germany. It has caused flooding in recent years.

Originating on top of the Kahler Asten near Winterberg in an intermittent spring at an elevation of 2,687 ft (819 m), the Lenne ends after a course of 129 km flowing into the Ruhr river near the city of Hagen. With an average discharge of 25 m^{3}/s near its mouth, it is one of the two main tributaries of the Ruhr, the other being the Möhne, which joins the Ruhr from the right.
