= Lenne Mountains =

Mountain range in Germany

Lenne Mountains (Lennegebirge)
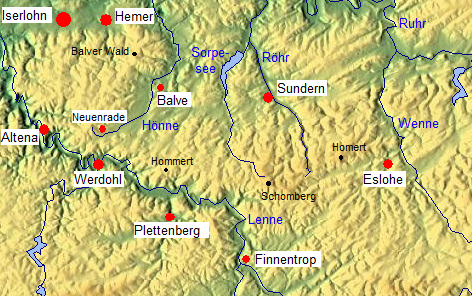
- Overview map of the Lenne Mountains

Highest point
- Peak: Homert
- Elevation: 656 m (2,152 ft)
- Coordinates: 51°15′51″N 08°06′28″E

Dimensions
- Length: 12 km (7.5 mi)

Geography
- Country: Germany
- State: North Rhine-Westphalia
- Region: Sauerland
- Districts: Märkischer Kreis, Olpe and Hochsauerlandkreis
- Parent range: Rhine Massif

Geology
- Rock types: Slate and Sandstone

The Lenne Mountains (German: Lennegebirge [ˈlɛnəɡəˌbɪʁɡə]), or Lenne Uplands (Lennebergland [ˈlɛnəbɛʁkˌlant]), is a range of hills up to 656 m above sea level (NN) high in the German state of North Rhine-Westphalia. It is part of the Süder Uplands within the Rhine Massif.

== Geography ==
=== Location ===
The Lenne Mountains lie in the Sauerland within the districts of Märkischer Kreis, Olpe and Hochsauerlandkreis. They are located north and northeast of the middle reaches of the Lenne between Hemer and Iserlohn to the northwest, Sundern to the north, Eslohe to the east, Finnentrop to the south, Plettenberg and Werdohl to the southwest and Altena to the west. The towns of Balve und Neuenrade lie within the Lenne Mountain region. The mountains forms the heart of the Homert Nature Park.

The Lenne Mountains are the northeastern continuation of the Ebbe Mountains, from which it is separated by the deep valley of the Lenne. To the northeast, on the other side of the river Ruhr, is the Arnsberg Forest, to the east the Fredeburg Land, to the southeast the Saalhausen Hills and to the west the Märkisches Land.

The uplands are crossed from southwest to northeast by a section of the B 229 federal road and the B 236 passes along its southwestern perimeter in a northwest–southeast direction.

=== Hills ===
The highest elevation is the Homert (656.1 m above NN) roughly south of Meinkenbracht. Other hills are the Schomberg (648 m), Waldeshöhe (625.8 m), Baukloh (616.0 m), Reinscheid (573.0 m), Denstenberg (560.0 m), Kohlberg (513.7 m), Hommert (504.8 m) and Kleiner Hemberg (497.2 m).

=== Rivers and lakes ===
The largest river in the region is the Lenne itself, whose middle course grazes the hills to the south and southwest. The following rivers rise in hills: the Hönne, Röhr, Sorpe und Salwey. The Sorpesee is a lake in the northern part of the range, in the south is the Glingebach Dam and in the east the Esmecke Reservoir.
