= Mettmecke =

River in Germany

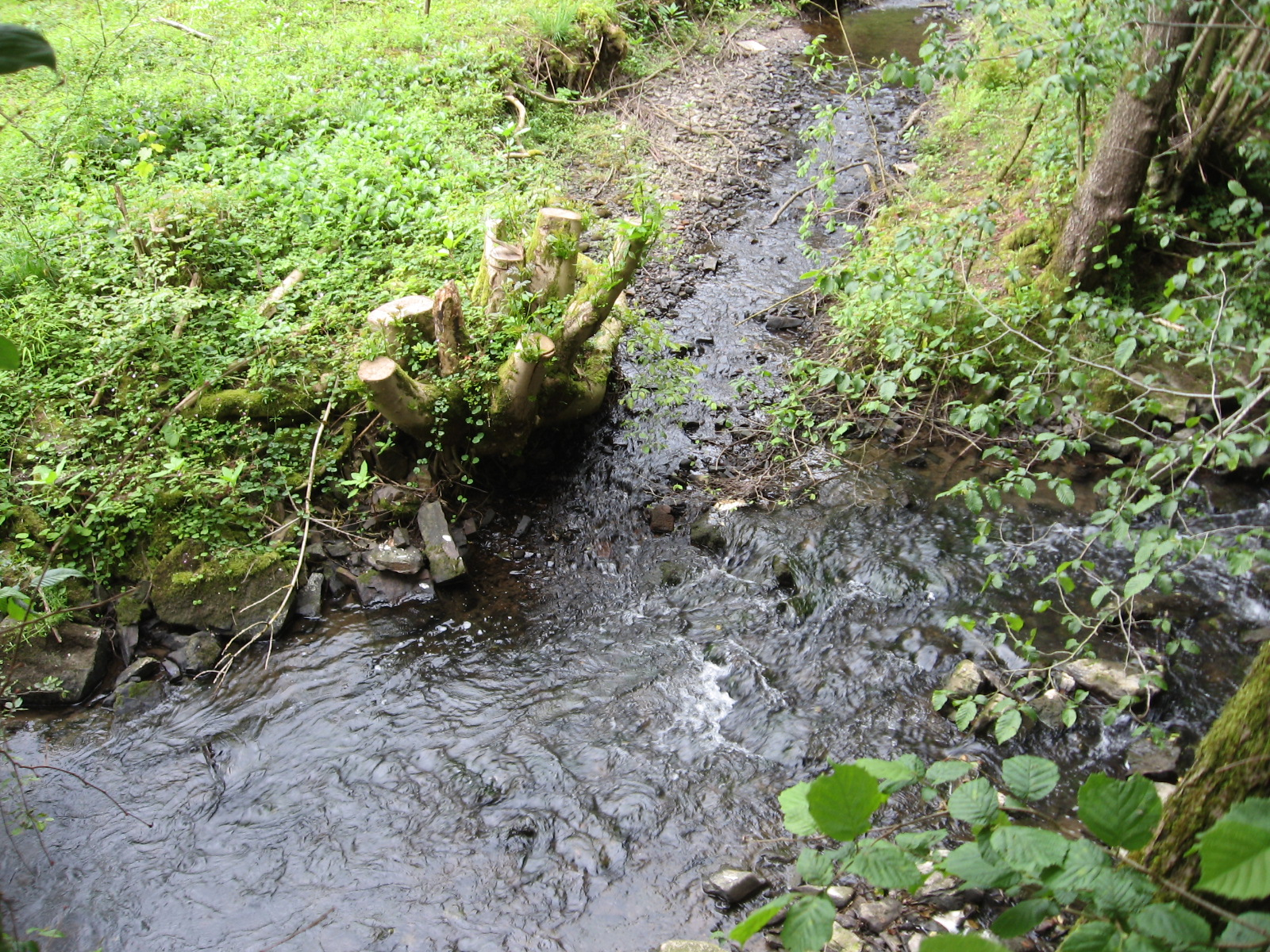

Location
- Country: Germany
- State: North Rhine-Westphalia

Physical characteristics
- Mouth
  - location: Linnepe
  - coordinates: 51.3257°N 8.0312°E
- Length: 4.8 km (3.0 mi)

Basin features
- Progression: Linnepe→ Röhr→ Ruhr→ Rhine→ North Sea

Mettmecke is a small river of North Rhine-Westphalia, Germany. It flows into the Linnepe near Sundern.

== See also ==
- List of rivers of North Rhine-Westphalia
