= Homert (Lenne Mountains) =

Mountain in Eslohe, Germany

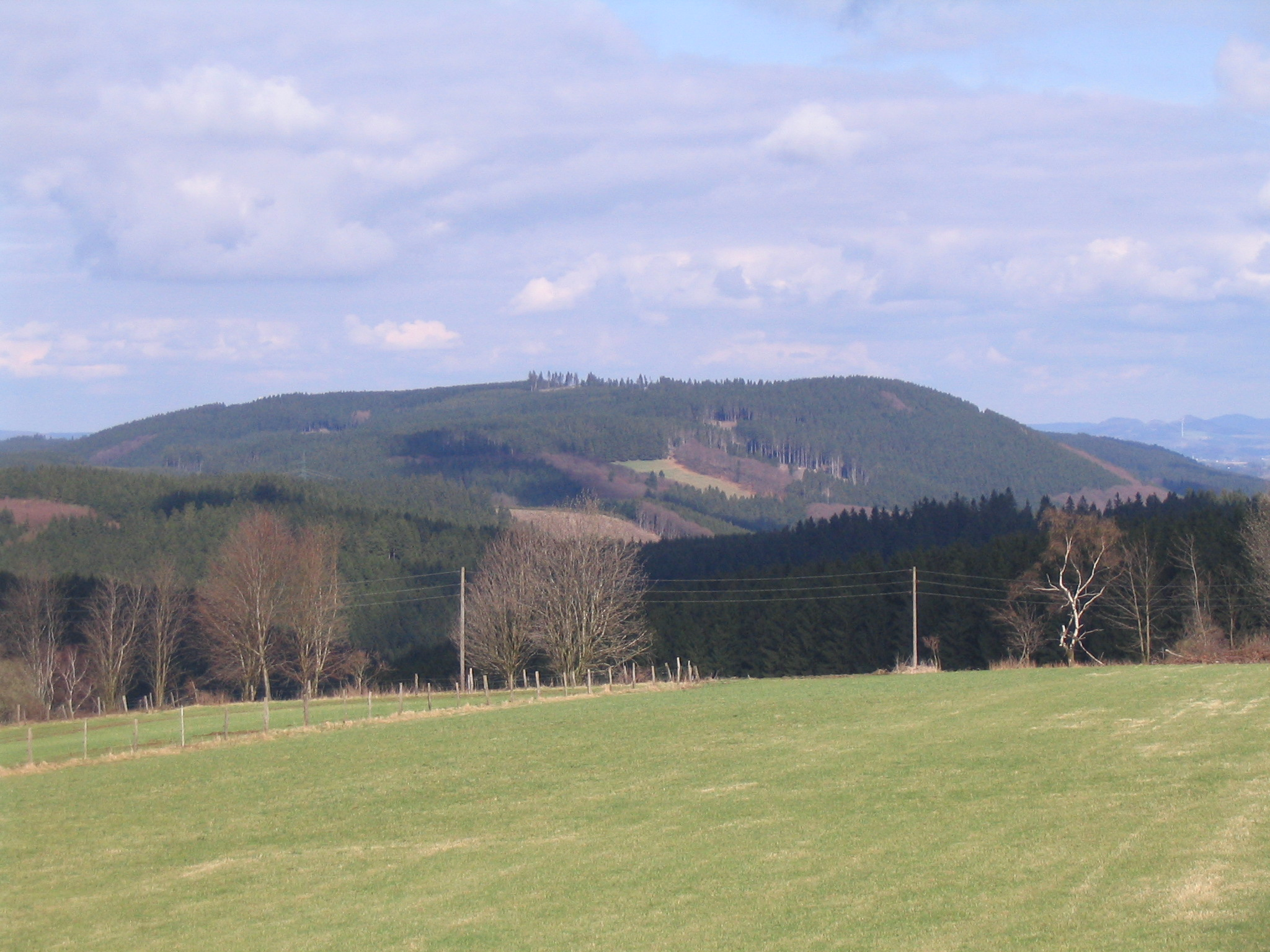
- The Homert viewed from the South-West

Highest point
- Elevation: 656.1 m above sea level (NN) (2,153 ft)
- Prominence: 187.8 m ↓ between Fehrenbracht and Kückelheim
- Isolation: 14.0 km → Auergang, Saalhausen Hills
- Coordinates: 51°15′52″N 8°06′23″E

Geography
- Location within North Rhine-Westphalia
- Location: Sauerland, Hochsauerlandkreis, North Rhine-Westphalia, Germany
- Parent range: Lenne Mountains

The Homert, at 656.1 m above sea level (NN), is the highest of the Sauerland's Lenne Mountains and lies in the county of Hochsauerlandkreis, North Rhine-Westphalia, Germany. It is also the highest mountain and namesake for the Homert Nature Park and the highest point on the southeastern ridge, the Homert (also Die Homert or Homertrücken).

== Location ==
The Homert rises in the southwestern part of the county of Hochsauerlandkreis, roughly in the centre of the triangle formed by Meinkenbracht, in the borough of Sundern, and Obersalwey in the south-southwest and Niedersalwey in the southeast, both in the borough of Eslohe. On the northern flank of the Homert rises the Seilbach stream and, a little to the northwest, the Romecke, both tributaries of the Linnepe. The Wenne tributary, the Salwey, flows through the valley south of the forested mountain.

== Transport links ==
To the south and west the state road, the Landesstraße 519, runs past the Homert, from the village of Niedersalwey via Obersalwey to Meinkenbracht. From this road there are woodland footpaths to the summit. The Homert Way is named after the mountain; it does not run over it, but for example, passes the eponymous ridge in the northeastern valley of the Wenne.
