= Settmecke =

River in Germany

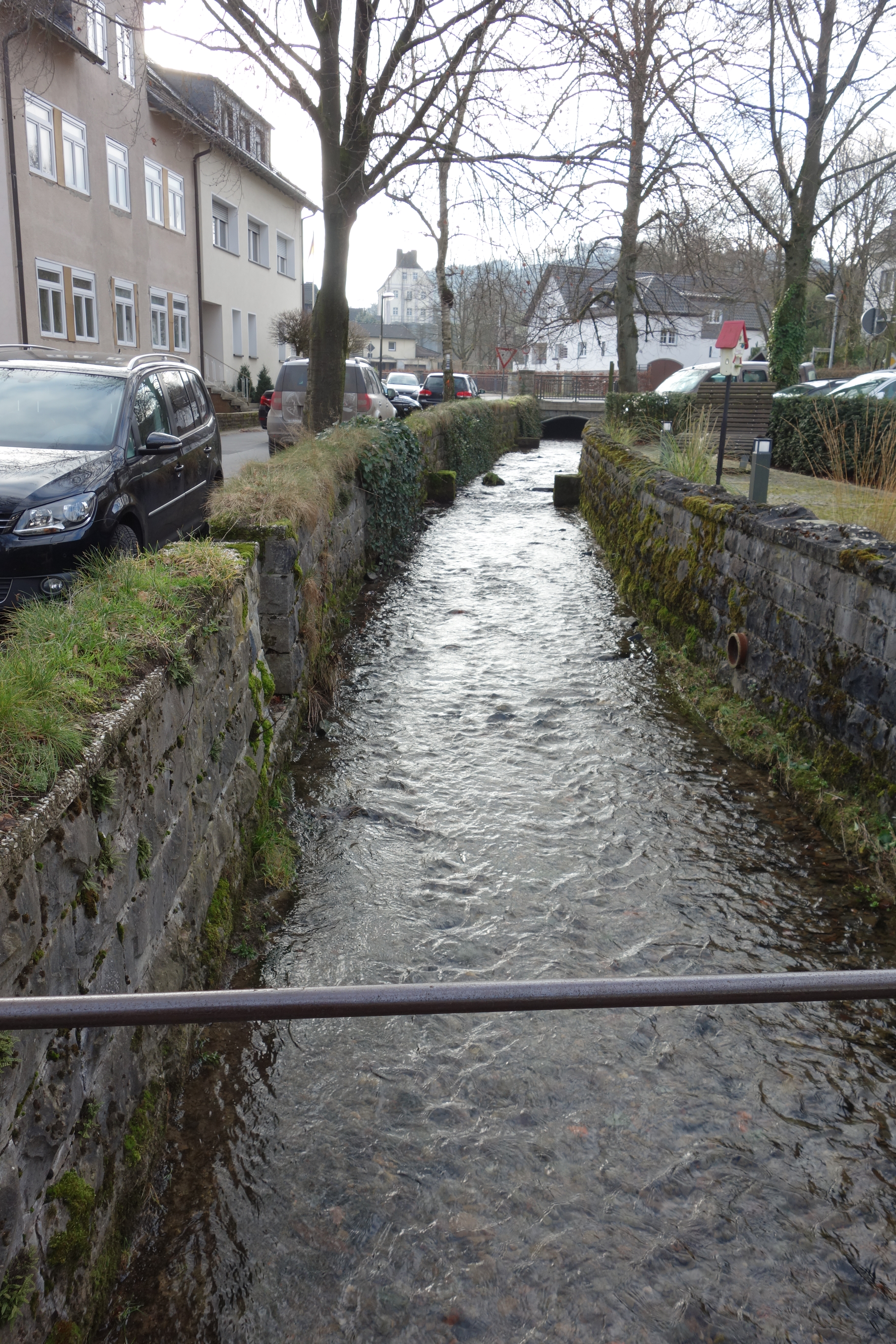

Location
- Country: Germany
- State: North Rhine-Westphalia

Physical characteristics
- Mouth
  - location: Röhr
  - coordinates: 51.3263°N 8.0048°E

Basin features
- Progression: Röhr→ Ruhr→ Rhine→ North Sea

Settmecke is a river of North Rhine-Westphalia, Germany. It is 9.9 km (6.2 mi) long and flows as a left tributary into the Röhr in Sundern.

== See also ==
- List of rivers of North Rhine-Westphalia
