= Romecke =

Romecke may refer to:

- Romecke (Möhne), a river of North Rhine-Westphalia, Germany, tributary of the Möhne
- Romecke (Linnepe), a river of North Rhine-Westphalia, Germany, tributary of the Linnepe
