= Sorpe =

Sorpe may refer to:

- Sorpe (Röhr), a river of Hochsauerlandkreis, North Rhine-Westphalia, Germany, tributary of the Röhr
  - Sorpe Dam, a dam on the Sorpe river
- Sorpe (Lenne), a river of North Rhine-Westphalia, Germany, tributary of the Lenne
- Sorpe, a village of the municipality of Alt Àneu, in Catalonia, Spain
