= Norbert Peters (priest) =

Norbert Peters (5 August 1863 in Allendorf – 20 January 1938 in Paderborn) was a German Catholic biblical scholar, born at Allendorf. He was educated at the universities of Münster, Bonn, Tübingen, Würzburg, Eichstädt and at the Paderborn seminaries for priests. Ordained a priest in 1887, in 1892 he became professor of theology at Paderborn, where he was dean in 1898–1899, 1904–1905, and 1909–1910. His name is intimately connected with modern Catholic criticism of the Old Testament, especially the Book of Ecclesiastes, of which he edited in Hebrew text in 1902 with a German and in 1905 with a Latin version, and of which he published a German translation with commentaries in 1913. Among his other publications are:

- Die Prophetic Obadiahs (1892)
- Davids Jugend (1899)
- Beiträge zur Text- und Literarkritik des Buchs Samuel (1899)
- Bibel und Naturwissenschaft (1906)
- Katholische Kirche und Bibellesen (1908)
- Die Religion des Alten Testaments (1911)
- Der Text des Alten Testaments und seine Geschichte (1912)
- Der Krieg des Herrn (1914)
