= Endorf =

Endorf may refer to human settlements in Germany:

- Bad Endorf, Bavaria
- Endorf, North Rhine-Westphalia (part of Sundern)
- Endorf, Saxony-Anhalt
