= Norbert Peters =

Norbert Peters is the name of:

- Norbert Peters (priest) (1863–1938), born 1863, German priest
- Norbert Walter Peters (born 1954), composer
- Norbert Peters (engineer) (1942–2015), German engineer
