= Homert =

Homert is a German placename and may refer to the following places or geographical features in the state of North Rhine-Westphalia:

Place

- Homert (Lüdenscheid), a village named after the peak in the Ebbe Mountains in the municipality of Lüdenscheid in

Mountains and hills (sorted by height)

- Homert (Lenne Mountains) (656.1 m), near Eslohe-Obersalwey in the Lenne Mountains, Homert Nature Park, county of Hochsauerlandkreis
- Homert (Ebbe Mountains) (538.3 m), near Lüdenscheid-Homert in the Ebbe Mountains, Ebbegebirge Nature Park, county of Märkischer Kreis
- Homert (Olpe) (536.7 m), near Olpe-Oberneger in the Ebbegebirge Nature Park, county of Olpe
- Homert (Oberbergischer Kreis) (519.2 m), near Gummersbach-Oberrengse in the Bergisches Land Nature Park, county of Oberbergischer Kreis
- Homert (Altenaffeln) (511.2 m), near Neuenrade-Altenaffeln in the Lenne Mountains, Homert Nature Park, county of Märkischer Kreis

Nature parks

- Homert Nature Park, in the counties of Märkischer Kreis, Hochsauerlandkreis and Olpe
