= Romecke (Linnepe) =

River in Germany

Location
- Country: Germany
- States: North Rhine-Westphalia

Physical characteristics
- Mouth
  - location: Linnepe, south of Meinkenbracht, a parish of Sundern, Hochsauerlandkreis
  - coordinates: 51°16′34″N 8°05′11″E

Basin features
- Progression: Linnepe→ Röhr→ Ruhr→ Rhine→ North Sea

Romecke is a small river of North Rhine-Westphalia, Germany. It is a right tributary of the Linnepe before Meinkenbracht, a parish of Sundern.

== See also ==
- List of rivers of North Rhine-Westphalia
