= Severin Elektro =

German electric home appliances manufacturer

Coordinates: 51.314703°N 8.011551°E

SEVERIN Elektrogeräte GmbH
- Type: GmbH
- Industry: Electronics
- Founded: 1892
- Headquarters: Sundern, Germany
- Key people: Ulrich Cramer, Dr. Joyce Gesing, Christian Strebl
- Products: Household appliances
- Number of employees: c. 900 (2020)
- Website: www.severin.com

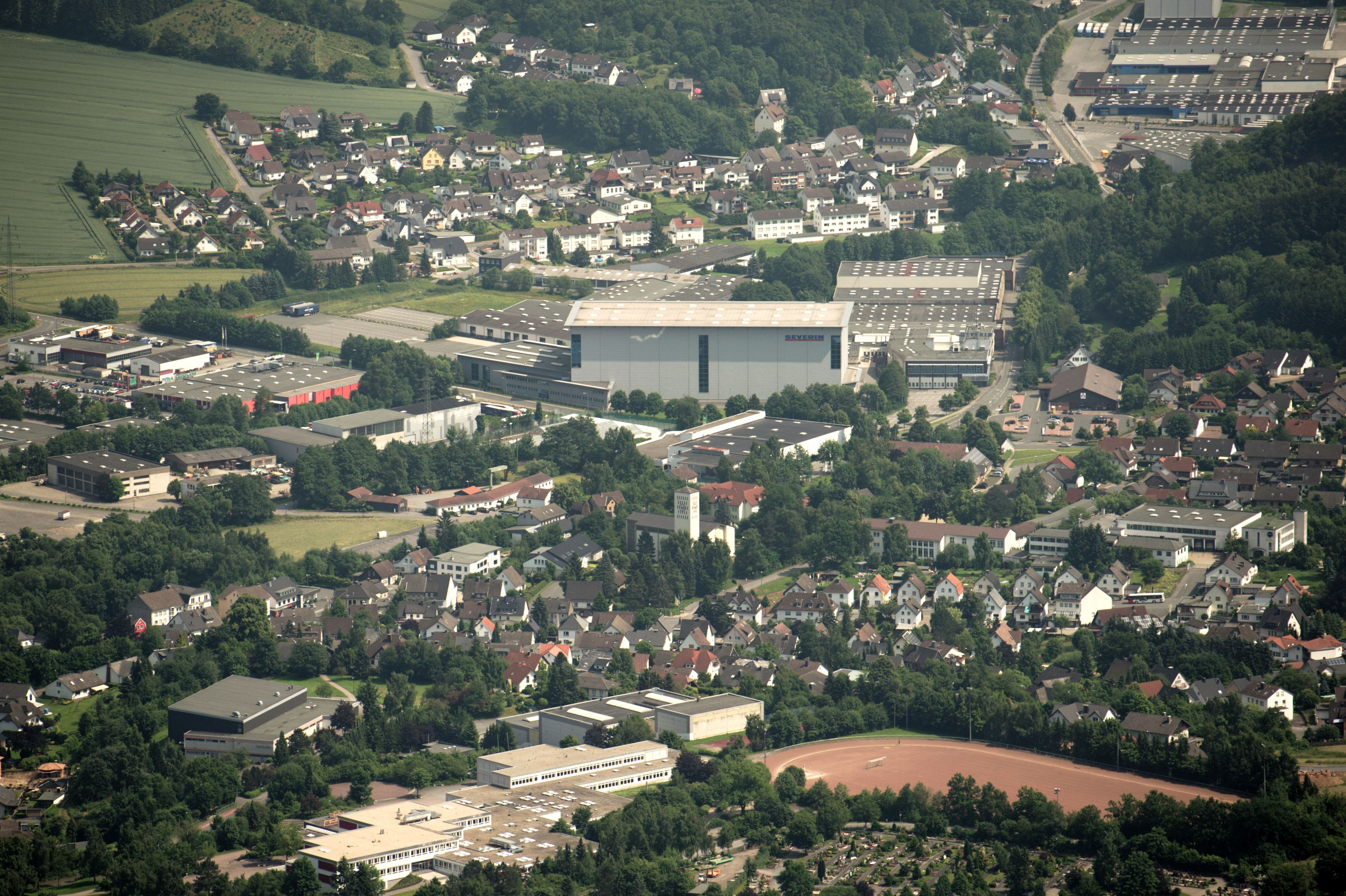
Headquarter in Sundern, Germany

SEVERIN Elektrogeräte GmbH is a German manufacturer of electric home appliances with its headquarters in Sundern, Germany.

== History ==
The Severin company emerged from a blacksmith shop founded by Anton Severin in 1892. After the First World War, the Anton Severin Metallfabrik was founded. With the production of curtain rods, it was one of several companies in Sundern specialising in this area of metalware production. In December 1921 the Severin Elektrogeräte GmbH was founded as A. Severin & Co Company. In 1922, the production site was relocated within the town and the manufacturing of aluminium tableware started. A short time later this product range was abandoned, and the production of cake plates, coasters and glass plates became more important. Later serving trolleys were added as well.

After the end of the Second World War the course of business remained rather modest. This changed after the currency reform; the company benefited from the increasing demand for consumer goods. In 1948 a new factory building was erected. Since 1952, Severin has been producing electrical appliances, mainly for the household. Between 1956 and 1962 the company expanded strongly and four factory halls were added. In 1962 a branch factory was built in Wenholthausen, which initially produced drying hoods and fan heaters, but later mainly focused coffee machines. In 1966 another factory was built in Wallen near Meschede. By 1967, the year of the 75th anniversary, 200 different types of small electrical appliances were produced. In order to produce plastic parts a plant was built in Berge near Meschede in 1977. The plants in Wallen and Wenholthausen were closed in later years.

== Today's structure ==
The product range includes items such as coffee machines, water kettles, toasters, egg cookers, electrical grills and raclette grills, mixers, vacuum cleaners, hair and body care products. In total, more than 200 different electrical appliances are available in the product range. In 2011, the company had over 2,600 employees worldwide and is represented in over 80 countries. Severin has sales offices in France, Spain, Sweden, the Netherlands, Italy and Poland. Production has been taking place in production plants located in Shenzhen, China, since 1995. Production in Sundern was subsequently discontinued in 2020. In the summer of 2013, Severin reduced the number of employees in Sundern by 52 from 387 in 2012 to 335 due to low sales. In the 24 months to August 2014, Severin demonstrated innovative ability by launching over 60 new products and numerous patents. In March 2015, the entrepreneurial family Knauf from Dortmund invested in Severin and acquired a 49% shareholding. On 1 May 2018, the Knauf family took over 100% of the company shares. In spring 2020, the company launched a new, innovative electrical grill platform on the market, which was awarded the Kitchen Innovation Prize.

== Literatur ==
- Tanja Bessler-Worbs, Klaus Pradler (2001), Entdeckungen: Dokumente aus firmengeschichtlichen Sammlungen im südöstlichen Westfalen (in German), Arnsberg/Dortmund, p. 162, 962254444
- Michael Senger (Red.) (1999), "Firmenprofile aus dem Sauerland", Kiepe, Pflug und Schraubstock: Wirtschaftsleben im Sauerland (in German), Schmallenberg-Holthausen: Westfälisches Schieferbergbau- und Heimatmuseum, pp. 383–384, ISBN 3-930264-24-2
