= Sorpe Dam =

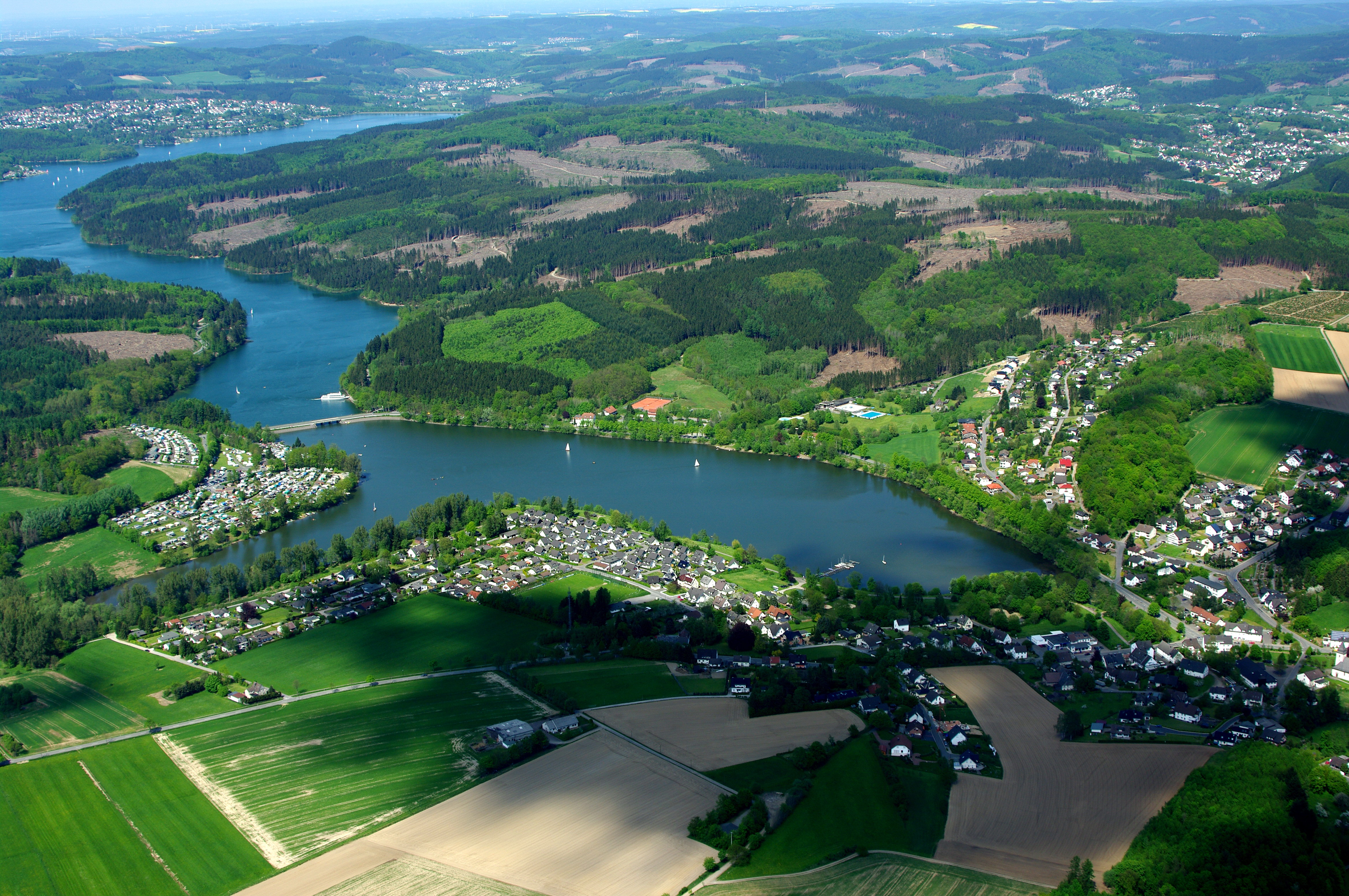
- Aerial photograph of Sorpesee; the Sorpe dam is in the very background

- Location within Germany
- Official name: Sorpetalsperre
- Country: Germany
- Location: Sundern, Hochsauerland
- Coordinates: 51°21′01″N 07°58′03″E
- Construction began: 1926
- Opening date: 1935

Dam and spillways
- Impounds: Sorpe (Röhr)
- Height: 69 m (226 ft)
- Length: 700 m (2,297 ft)
- Dam volume: 3,380,000 m^{3} (119,000,000 ft^{3})

Reservoir
- Total capacity: 70 MCM
- Surface area: 3.3 km^{2} (1.3 mi^{2})

Power Station
- Type: Conventional
- Installed capacity: 7.44 MW

The Sorpe Dam (German: Sorpetalsperre) is a dam on the Sorpe river, near the small town of Sundern in the district of Hochsauerland in North Rhine-Westphalia, Germany.

Together with the Biggesee, the Möhne Reservoir, and the Verse reservoir, the Sorpe Reservoir is one of the major artificial lakes of the Sauerland's Ruhrverband reservoir association. It serves as a water supply source, drives hydroelectric generators, and is used for leisure and recreation.

== Geography ==
The Sorpe Dam is situated to the north of the Homert natural park, south-west of the city of Arnsberg in an area belonging to the borough of Sundern (Sauerland) between the villages of Langscheid (at the dam) and Amecke. It is supplied by the Sorpe stream.

About once a year in spring, the reservoir runs over into the spillway, generating massive whitewater down the cascades to the stilling basin that draws crowds of spectators for a few days.

=== Neighbouring municipalities ===
- Balve
- Sundern

== History ==
The major prerequisite for the construction of the Sorpe Dam was the completion of the Röhrtal railway on 1 June 1900, a standard gauge Kleinbahn connecting Sundern to the Obere Ruhrtalbahn at Neheim-Hüsten. During construction, its steam locomotives pulled heavy construction trains over a specially laid construction spur and the newly erected railway viaduct at Stemel to what became Europe's largest construction site between 1926 and 1935. In total, the steam trains carried more than 300,000 metric tonnes of construction material to the Sorpe dam, where smaller light railways took over.

In World War II, the Sorpe Dam was among the targets of the British airstrikes of Operation Chastise in the night from 16 to 17 May 1943, as were the dams on the Eder and Möhne. In these attacks, the Royal Air Force attempted to destroy the dams using bouncing bombs, achieving at least one direct hit on the Sorpe Dam. According to the BBC 'Dambusters Declassified' the bomb used on Sorpe was not to spin as it was dropped on the dam rather than on the water and had no need to bounce. However, while the older arch-gravity dams of Eder and Möhne were successfully breached, causing a catastrophic flooding of the Ruhr valley, the Sorpe's embankment dam with its concrete core covered in soil withstood the attacks with only minor damage. The planners of the Operation had estimated that it would take 5 of the bouncing bombs placed correctly to weaken the dam sufficiently for water pressure to complete the break. The attacks also had to be made parallel to the line of the dam rather than perpendicular. A second British airstrike on 15 October 1944 with five-ton Tallboy bombs also failed, leaving behind only several huge craters and causing minor spillage.

After the war, in late 1958 the reservoir was drained for bomb damage repairs, in the course of which, shortly before Christmas, workers discovered an unexploded Tallboy bomb. On 6 January 1959 the whole village of Langscheid was evacuated while Northrhine-Westphalia's chief bomb disposal officer, Walter Mietzke, and British Lieutenant, James M. Waters, jointly defused the 3.6m long bomb that still contained 2.5 metric tonnes of high explosive and 3 highly unstable tail-fuzes.

== Recreation ==
Today, the Sorpe Reservoir affords opportunities to several recreational activities like scuba diving, rowing, yachting, windsurfing, beach volleyball, and recreational fishing, while the surrounding area offers a golf course, hiking trails, rock climbing, four lakeshore campsites on the west bank, and more. It has therefore become a favourite local recreation area for residents of the nearby Ruhr Area and is also popular with Dutch tourists. The passenger motor ship MS Sorpesee is available for outings during the summer season. Four DLRG lifeguard bases as well as a Red Cross base on campsite 3 provide safety.

The campsites are numbered 2 through 5 from North to South; the youth hostel was built at the location of former campsite 1.

A new bicycle and pedestrian lane was constructed on the west bank parallel to the quayside road in 2006, connecting the hamlets of Sundern-Amecke and Sundern-Langscheid. Motor access to the east bank road is limited to service vehicles. Private motor boats are prohibited on the reservoir to prevent oil spills and for maintaining a high drinking water quality.

== Image gallery ==
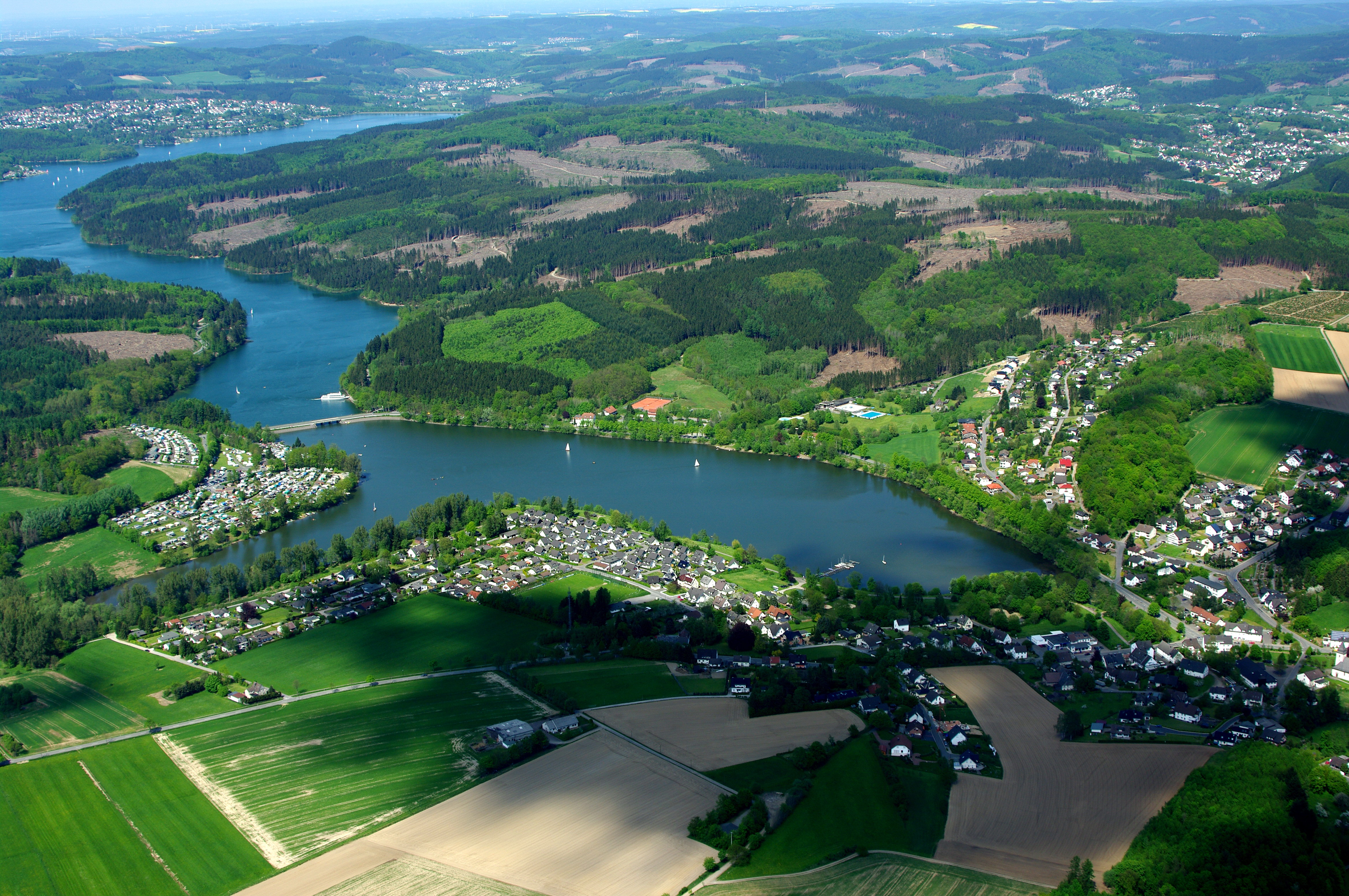
View of the reservoir looking north, foreground: Amecke, background: Langscheid

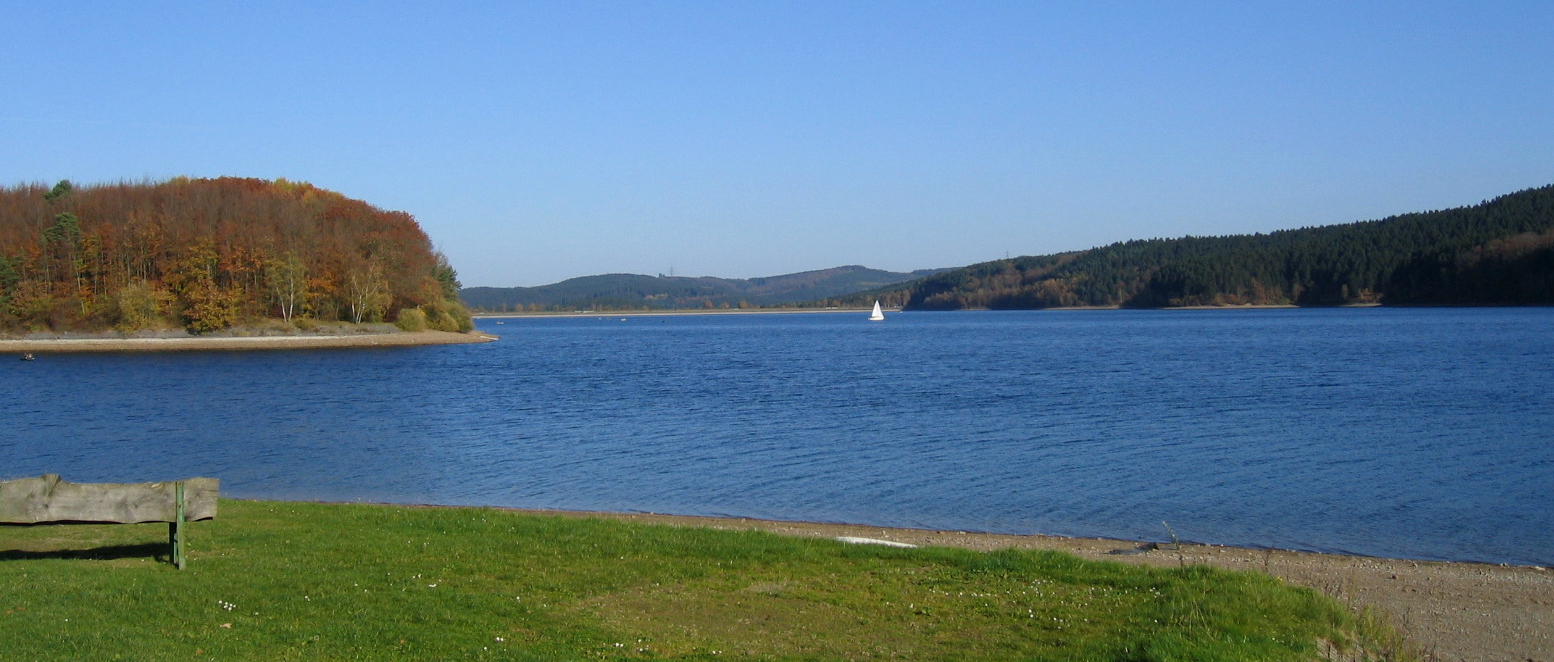
View of the dam from one of the campsites on the West bank

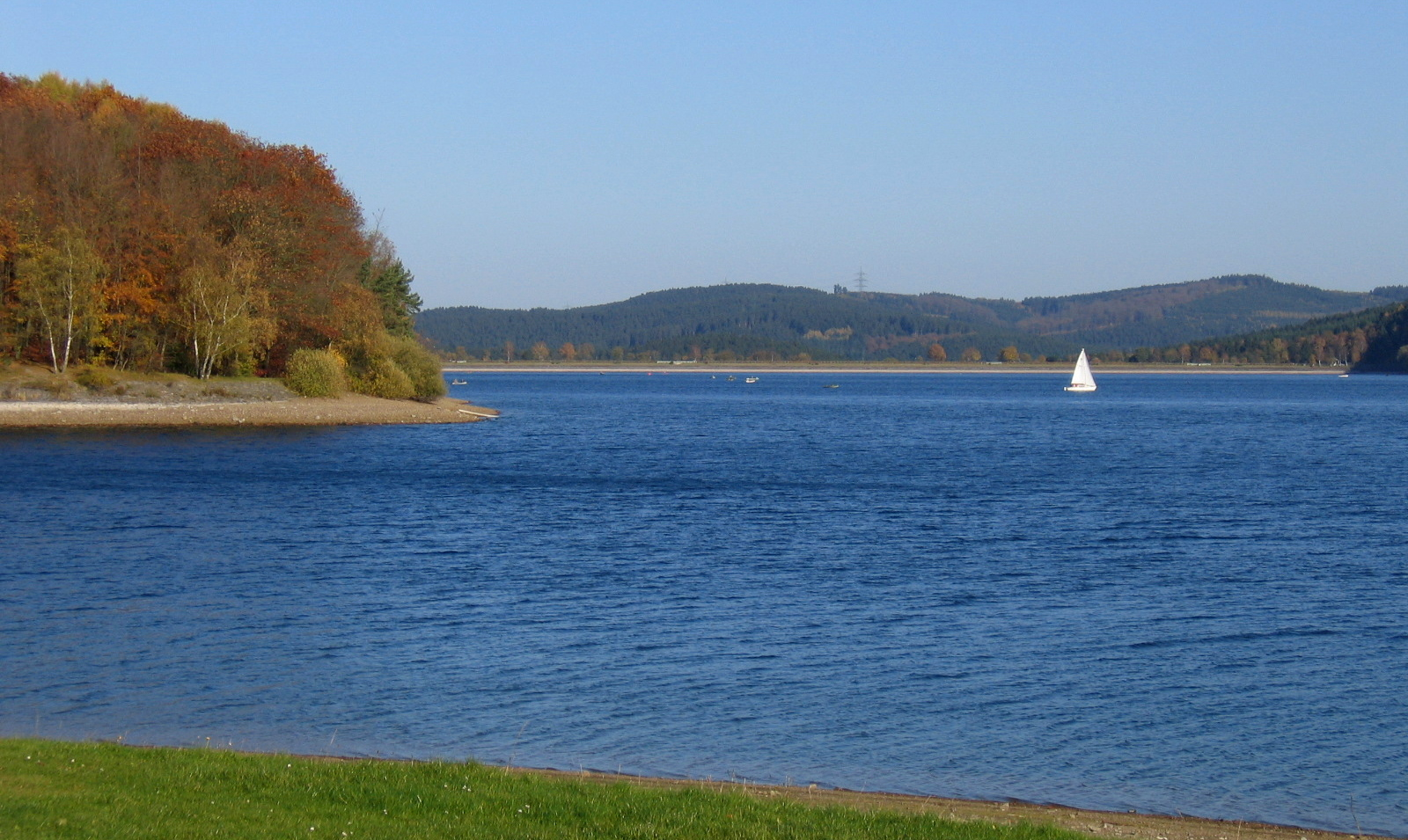
View of the dam from one of the campsites on the West bank

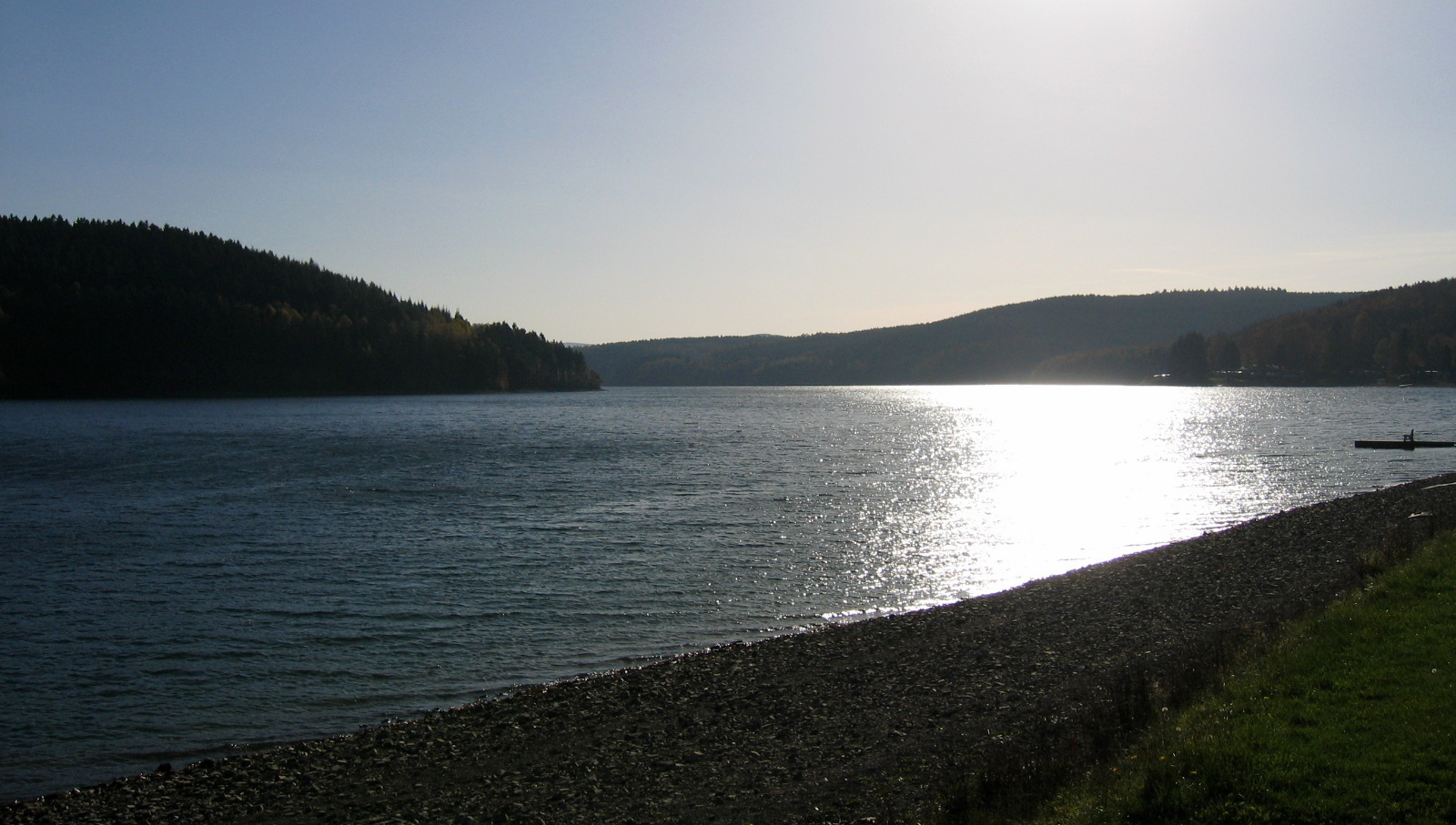
View from the West bank looking South

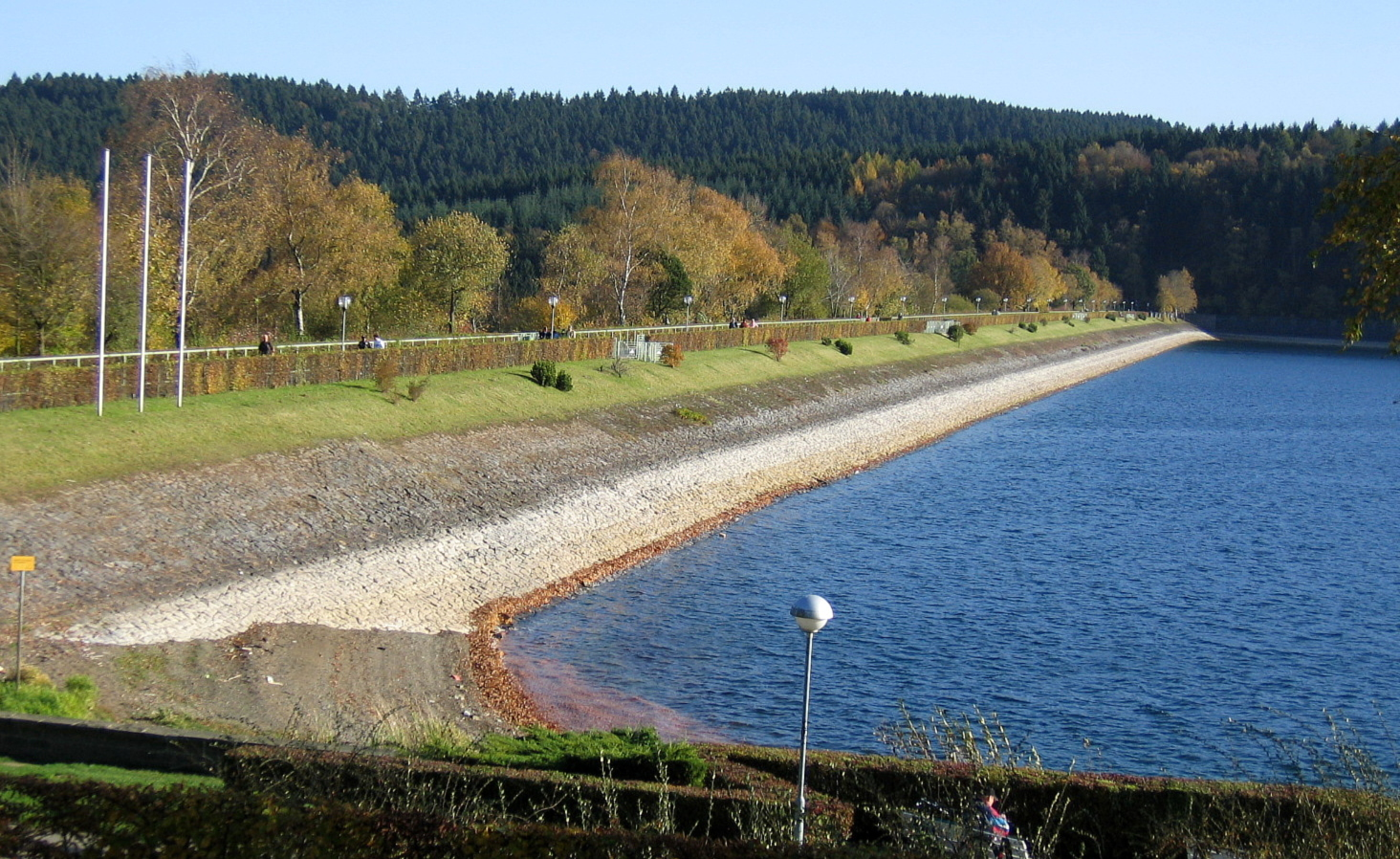
View of the dam from the West bank

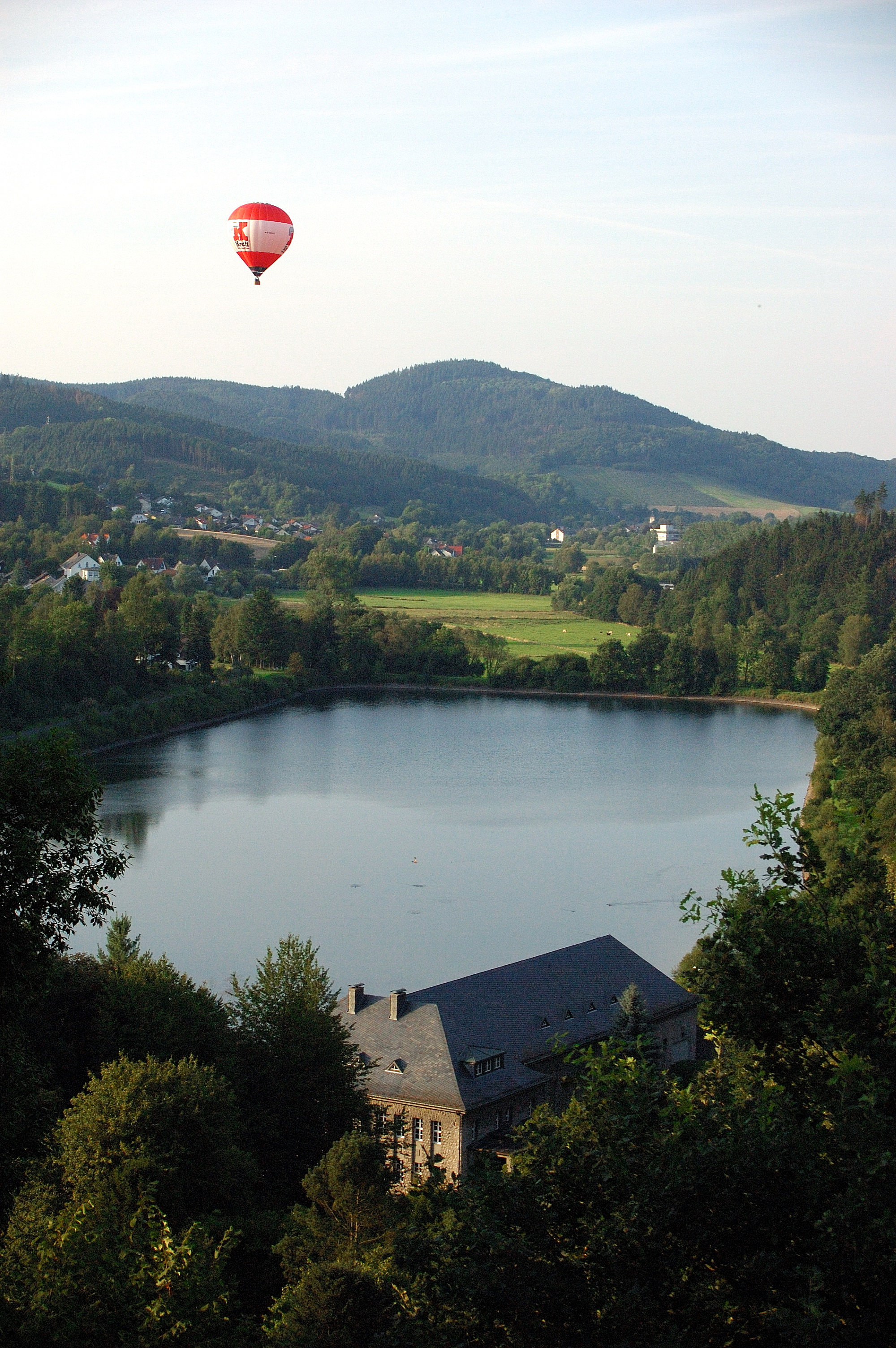
Stilling basin

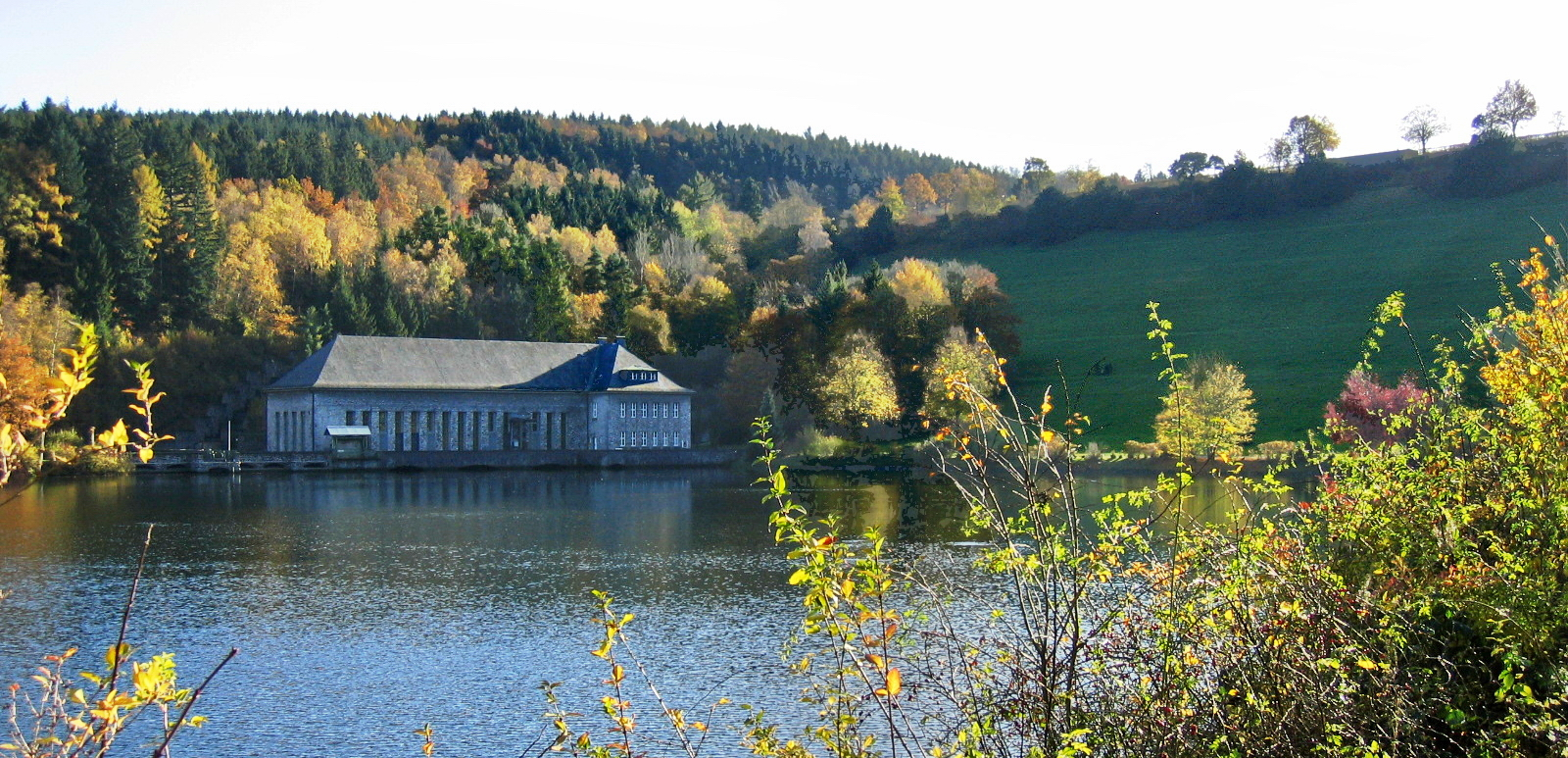
Stilling basin, hydroelectric power station and dam

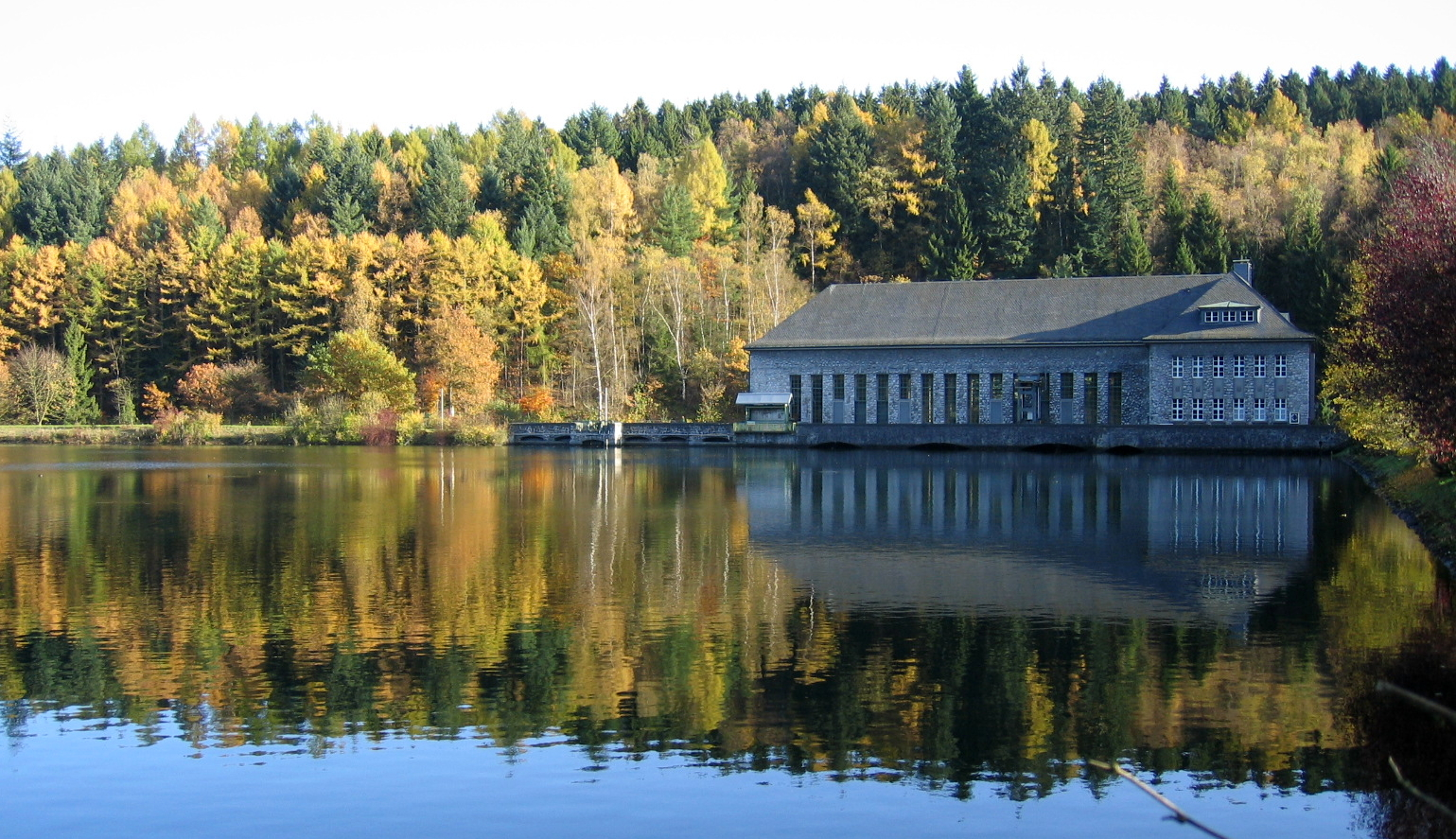
Stilling basin and hydroelectric power station

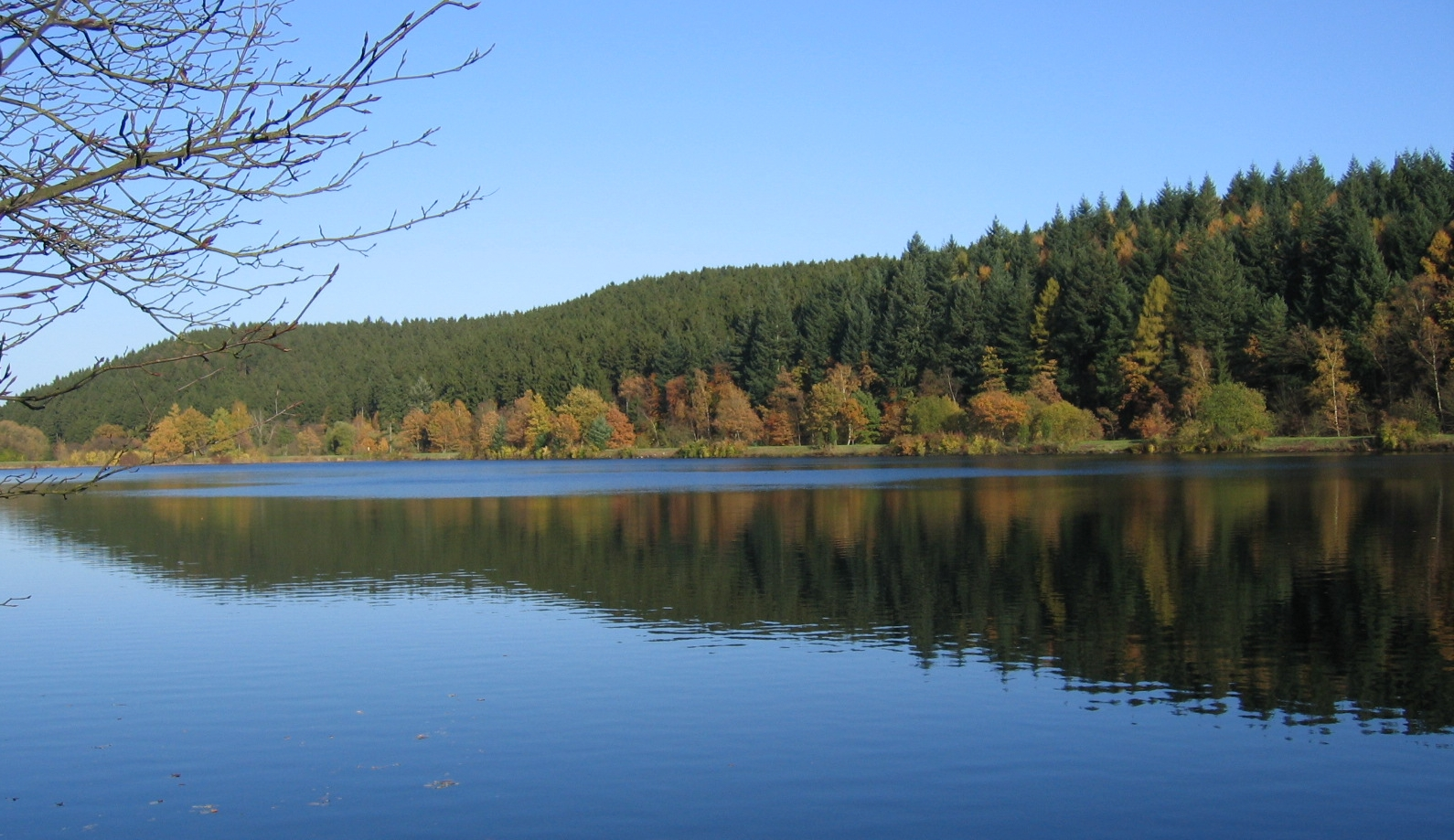
Stilling basin

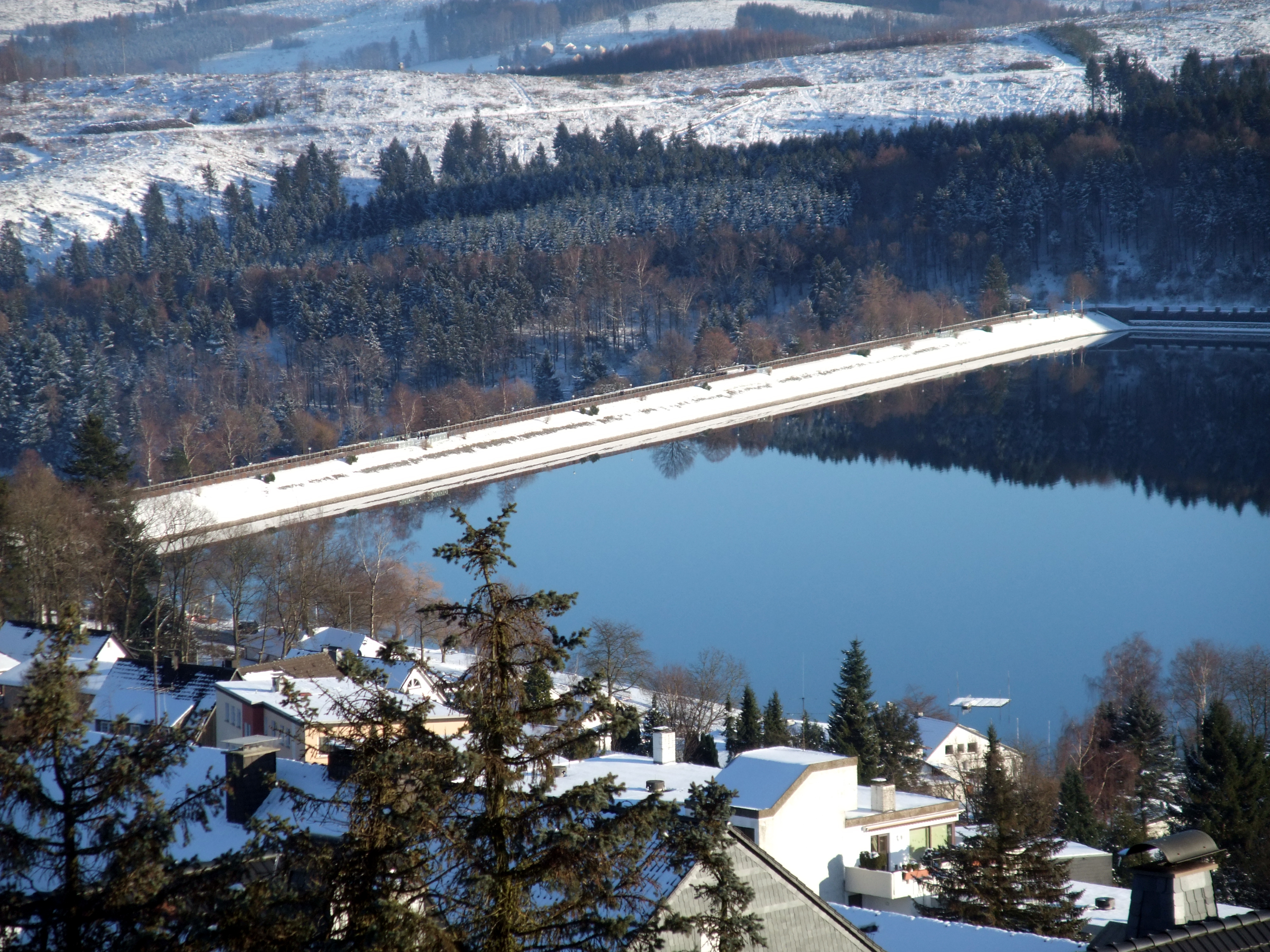
Sorpe dam seen from Langscheid look-out tower in winter

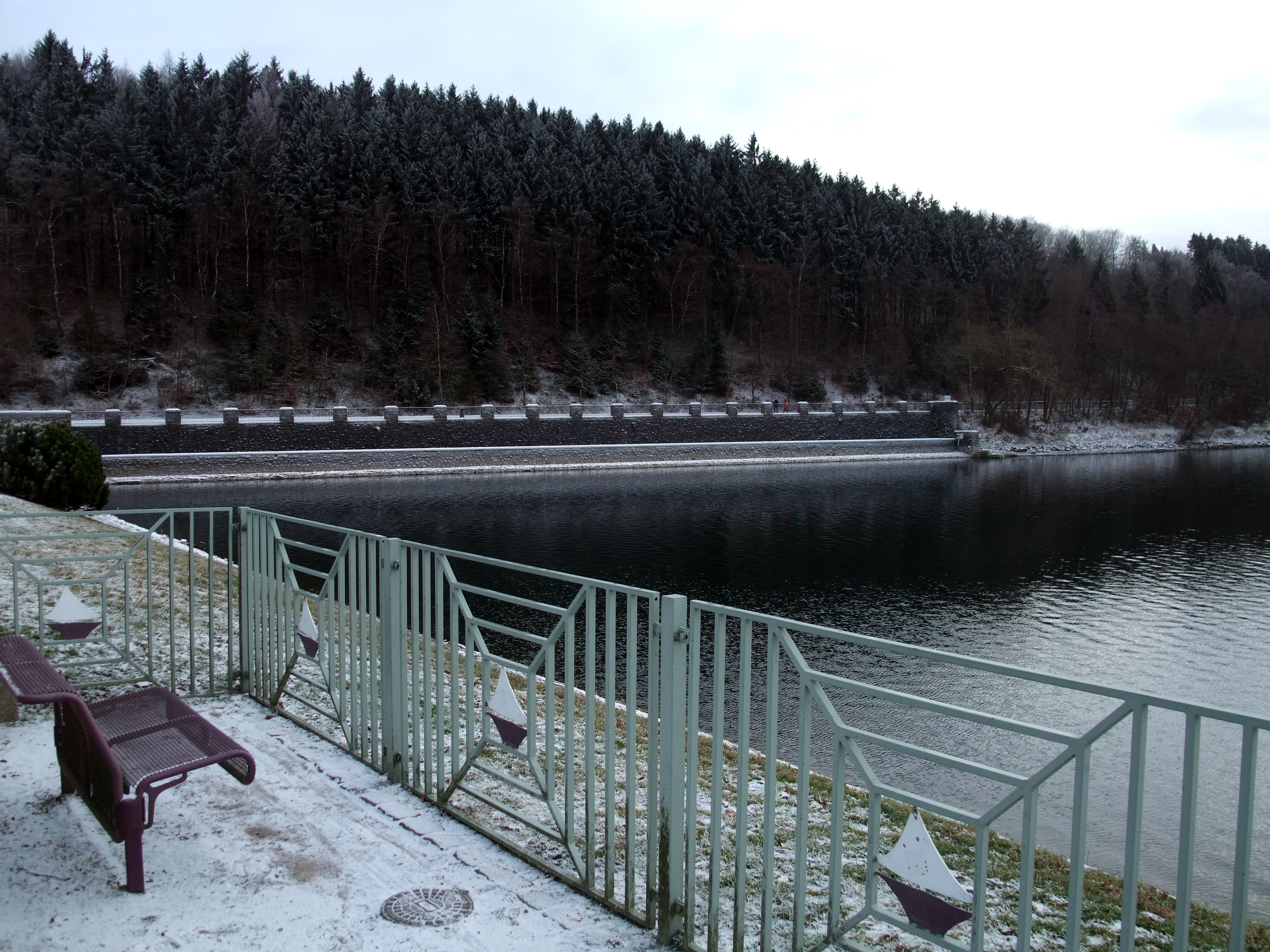
Spillway

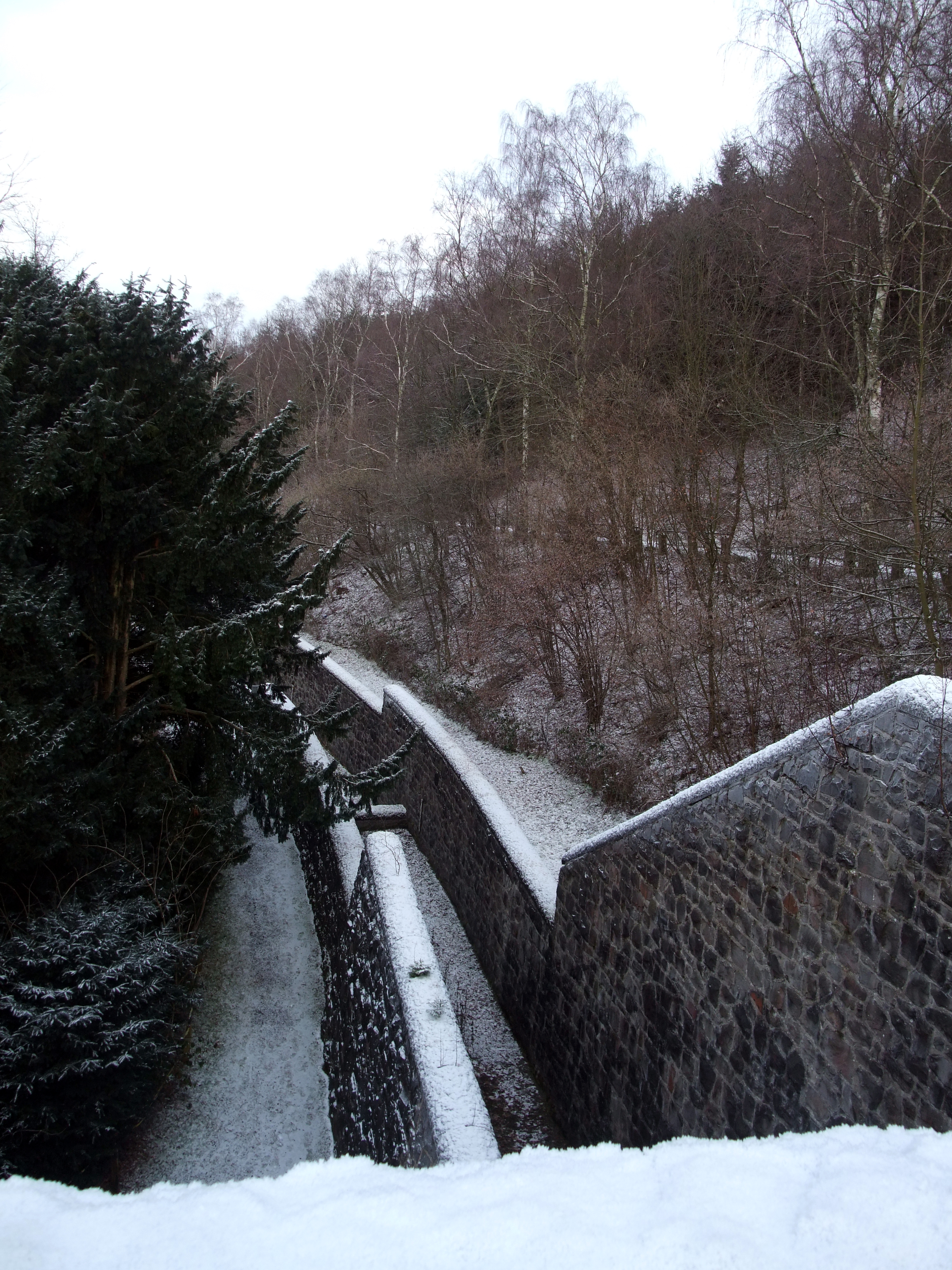
Spillway cascades

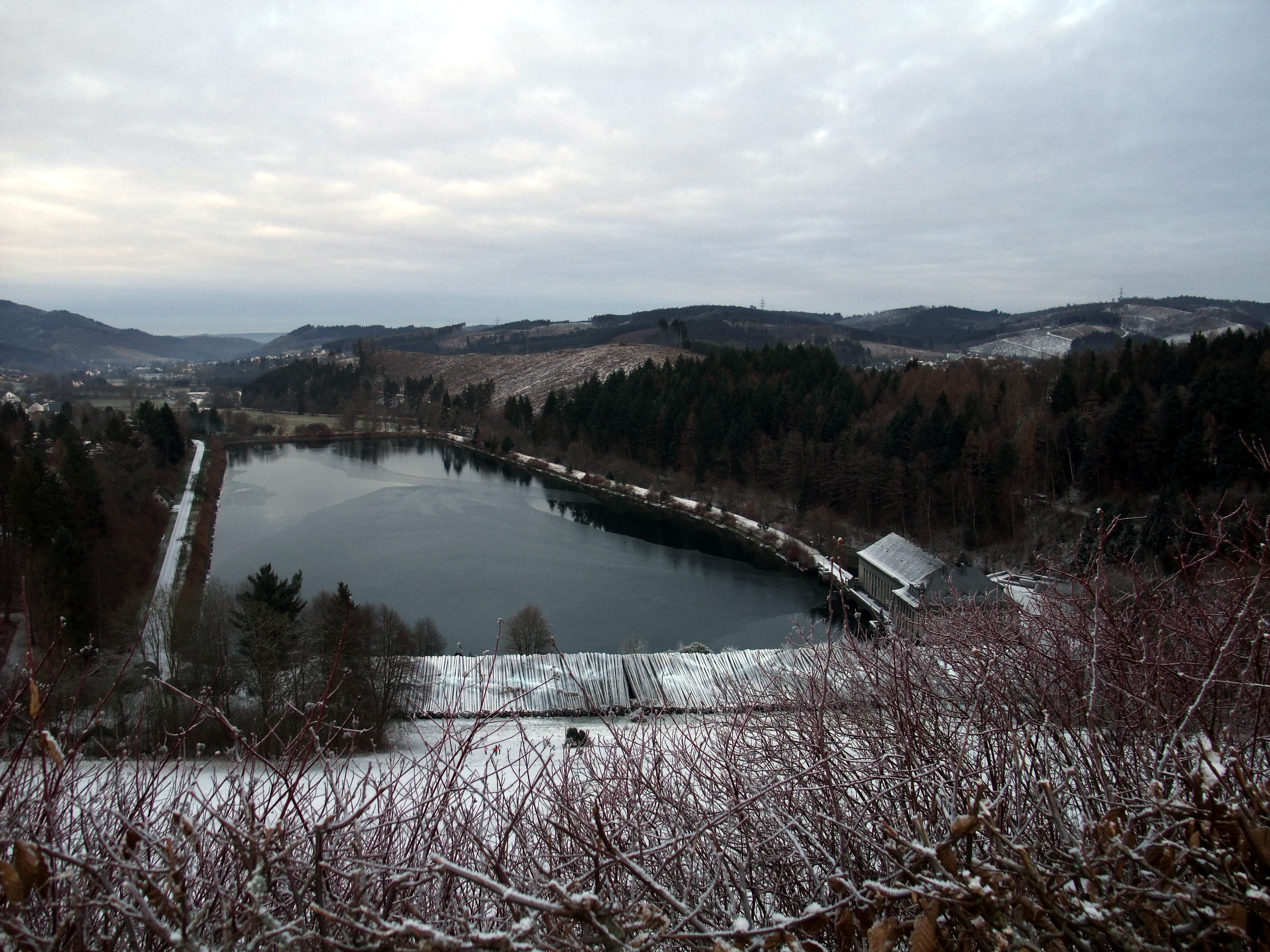
Stilling basin

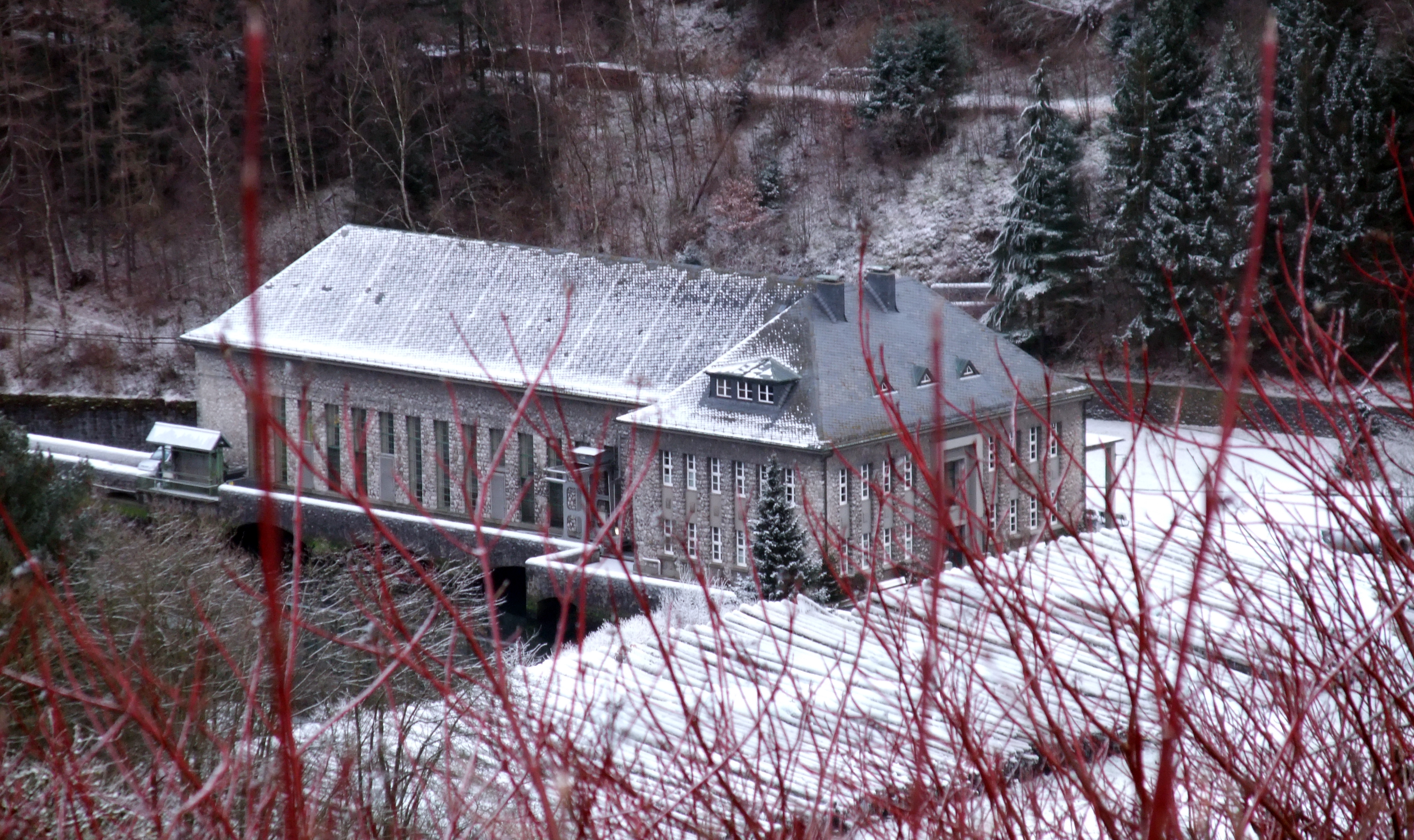
Hydroelectric power station seen from top of dam

== See also ==
- Röhr river
- Dams in North Rhine-Westphalia
- List of reservoirs and dams in Germany
