= Süder Uplands =

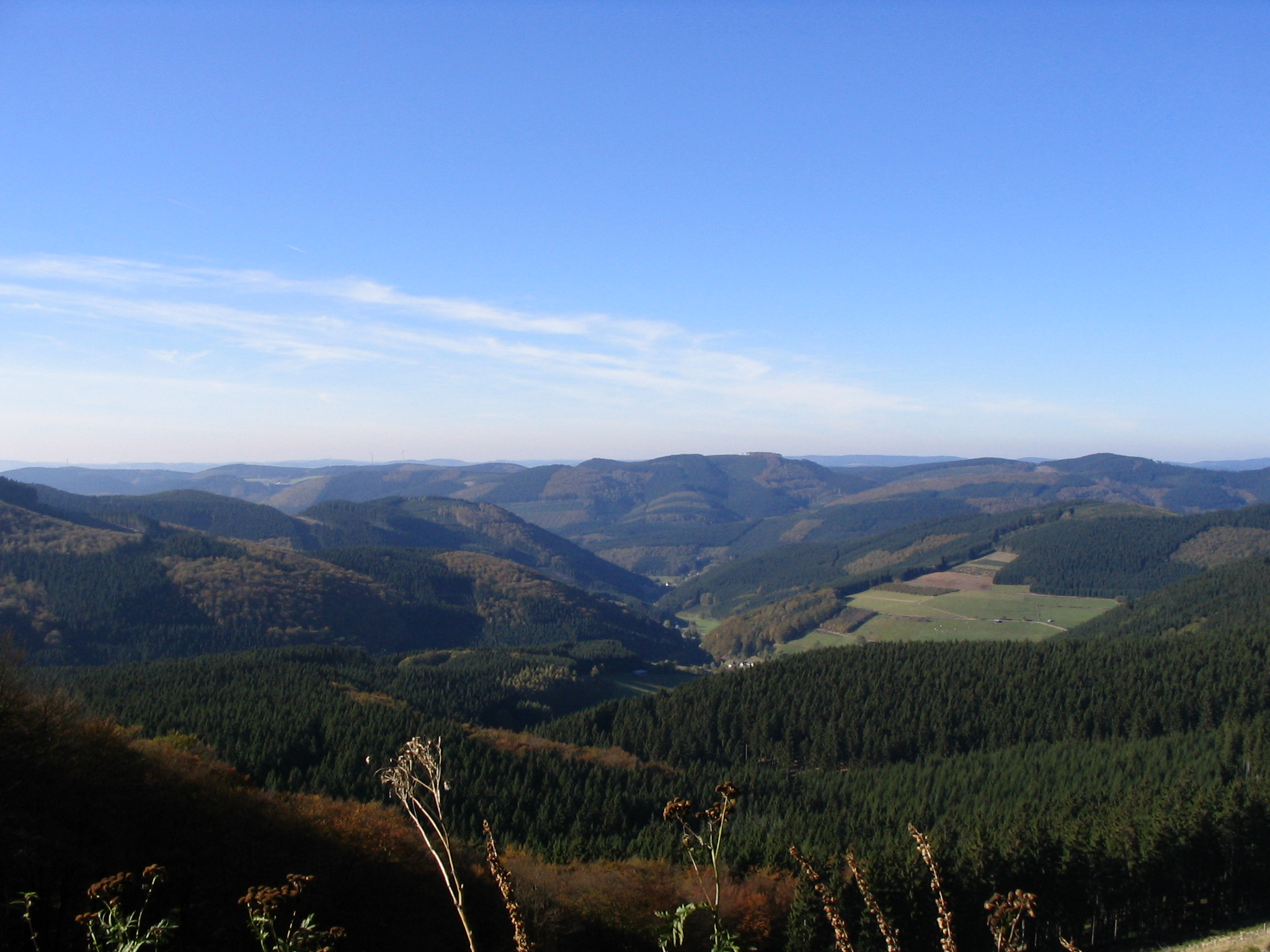
View from Härdler looking northwest over Milchenbach to the Saalhausen Hills, part of the Süder Uplands

The Süder Uplands (German: Süderbergland, sometimes Südergebirge i.e. Süder Hills), form a major natural region (no. 33 or D38) of the Rhenish Massif in the German states of North Rhine-Westphalia and northwestern Hesse. They correspond roughly to the historic regions of the Sauerland, Bergisches Land, Siegerland and Wittgenstein Land in NRW as well as the Upland and the extreme northwest of the Hinterland in Hesse.

== Mountain and hill ranges ==
The uplands include several mountain and hill ranges that are commonly referred to as the Sauerland:

- Rothaar Mountains (Langenberg, 843 m)
- Saalhausen Hills (Himberg, 688 m)
- Ebbe Mountains (Nordhelle, 663 m)
- Lenne Mountains (Homert, 656 m)
- Plackwald (582 m)

In listing these ranges the Bergisches Land with its 519 m high peak of Homert (Oberbergischer Kreis) is often counted. However these are foothills of the Ebbe Mountains, whilst the historic Bergisches Land lies on the slopes of the Süder Uplands as they gradually descend to the Rhine.

In a similar way the highest elevations of the historic Siegerland (such as the 678 m high Riemen) are not in the natural region of Siegerland (see major landscape units), but in the Rothaar Mountains. And the 633-metre-high Alte Burg lies geographically in the Siegerland, but is not the highest elevation of an independent ridge. Rather, it is part of the Siegerland Rothaar Foothills (Siegerländer Rothaar-Vorhöhen), which form the western slopes of the Rothaar Mountains.

The Hessian Upland in turn is part of the Rothaar Mountains forming the eastern edge of the range.

== See also ==
- Natural regions of Germany
