= Saalhausen Hills =

Hill range in Germany

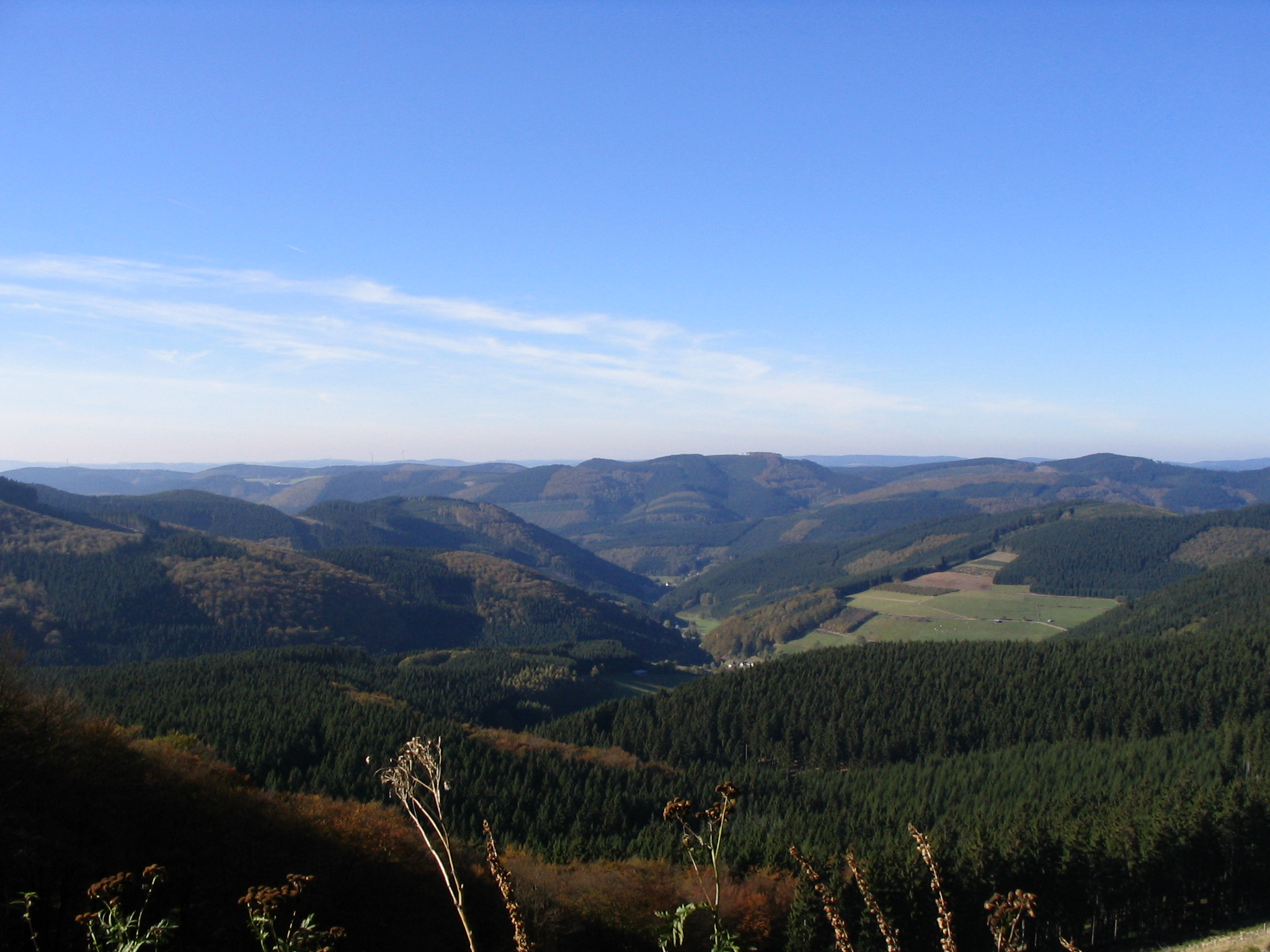
- Saalhausen Hills from the southeast (Härdler)

Highest point
- Peak: Himberg
- Elevation: 688 m (2,257 ft)
- Coordinates: 51°8′20″N 08°10′10″E

Dimensions
- Length: 15 km (9.3 mi)

Geography
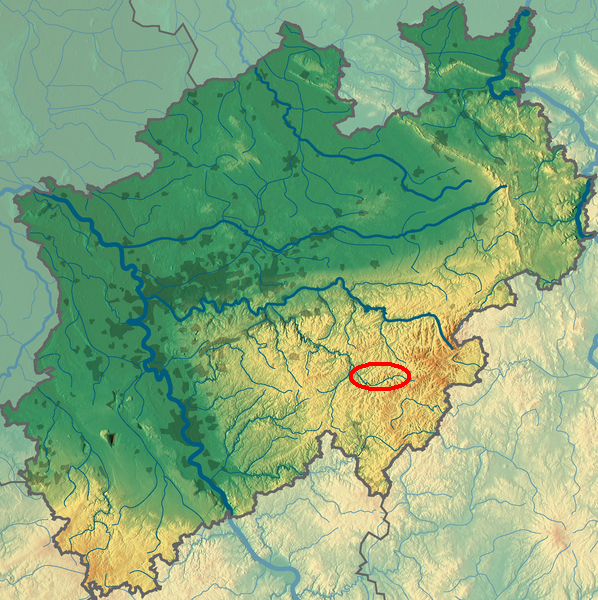
- Location of the Saalhausen Hills in NRW
- Country: Germany
- State: North Rhine-Westphalia
- Region: Sauerland
- Districts: Olpe and Hochsauerlandkreis
- Parent range: Rhine Massif

The Saalhausen Hills (German: Saalhauser Berge) are a range of hills up to 687.7 m above sea level (NN) high in the Sauerland region within the districts of Olpe and Hochsauerlandkreis in the German state of North Rhine-Westphalia. They are part of the Rhine Massif and lie within the Süder Uplands.

The hills are named after the village of Saalhausen, part of the town of Lennestadt, which is located on the southern edge of this forested region.

== Geography ==
The Saalhausen Hills are part of the South Sauerland Rothaar foothills (Südsauerländer Rothaarvorrückens), which belong to the West Sauerland Uplands (geographical unit no. 336). The hills are clearly delineated in the south by the Lenne and cover that part of the Sauerland between Lennestadt in the west and Schmallenberg in the east. To the northwest are the foothills of the Lennegebirge, to the southeast the Rothaargebirge, to the southwest other elements of the South Sauerland Rothaar foothills and to the northeast the Fredeburger Land. The hills, whose southwest and central areas fall within the Rothaargebirge Nature Park, are located north of the upper Lenne valley, southeast of the Elspebach and southwest of the upper course of the Wenne.

== Hills ==
The highest elevation in the Saalhausen Hills is the 687.7 m high Himberg. Other hills include the Auergang (684.1 m), Ösenberg (678.8 m), Hoher Lehnberg (668.8 m), Hoher Hagen (642.2 m), Jürgensberg (618.9 m), Beerenberg (614.1 m), Haferhagen (611.4 m), Kuhhelle (602.6 m), Stöppelkopf (572.0 m) and Robecker Berg (528.0 m).

== Tourism ==
A section of the Homert Trail runs through the Saalhausen Hills over a pass between the Himberg and Hoher Lehnberg.
