= Romecke (Möhne) =

River in Germany

Location
- Country: Germany
- State: North Rhine-Westphalia

Physical characteristics
- Mouth
  - location: Möhne
  - coordinates: 51.4759°N 8.4965°E
- Length: 4.3 km (2.7 mi)

Basin features
- Progression: Möhne→ Ruhr→ Rhine→ North Sea

Romecke is a small river of North Rhine-Westphalia, Germany. It is a right tributary of the Möhne near Rüthen.

== See also ==
- List of rivers of North Rhine-Westphalia
