= Endorf, North Rhine-Westphalia =

Coordinates: 51°17′N 8°2′E

Endorf is an Ortschaft (subdivision) of the town of Sundern in the Hochsauerland district of North Rhine-Westphalia, Germany.

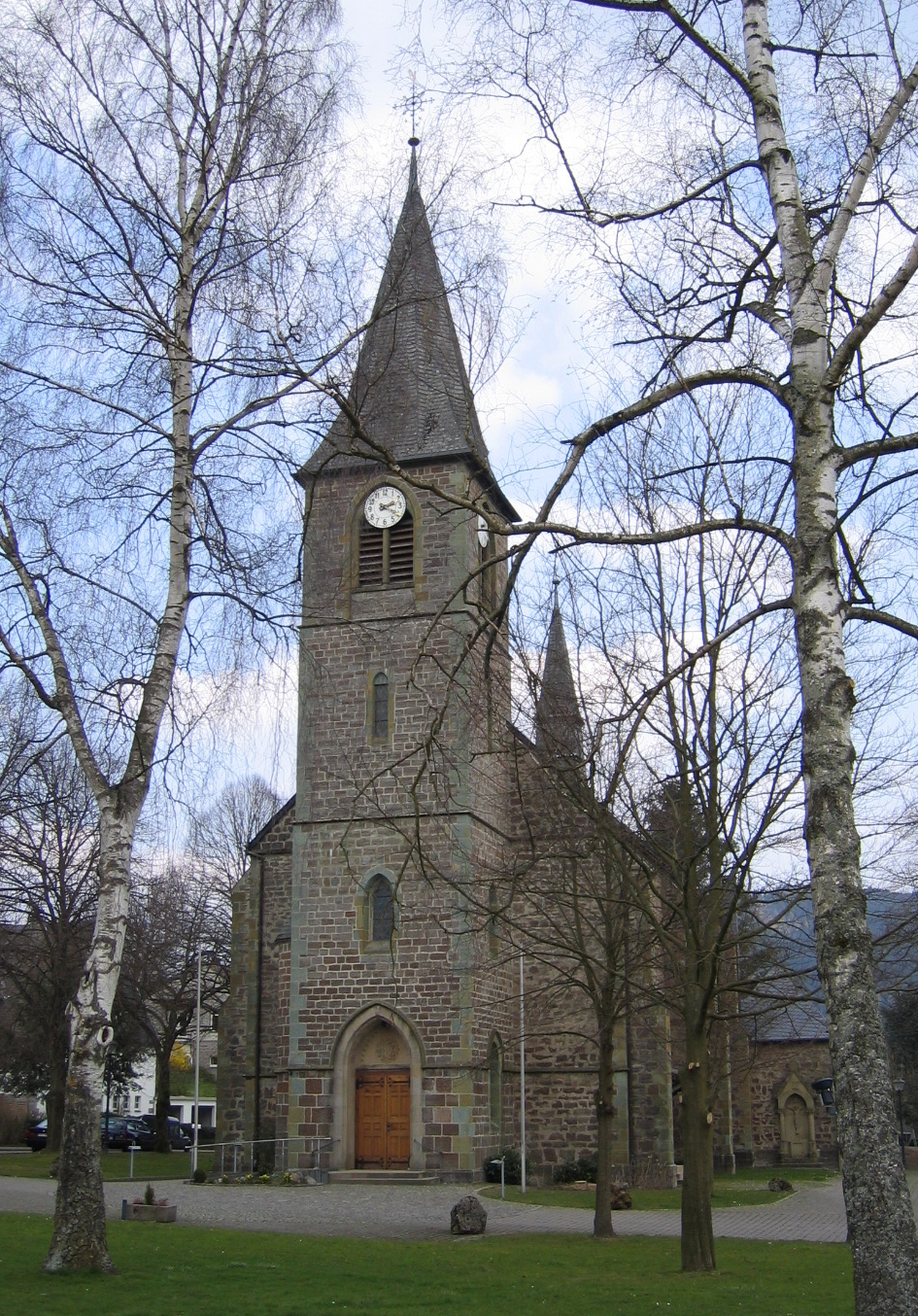
Church St. Sebastian in Endorf

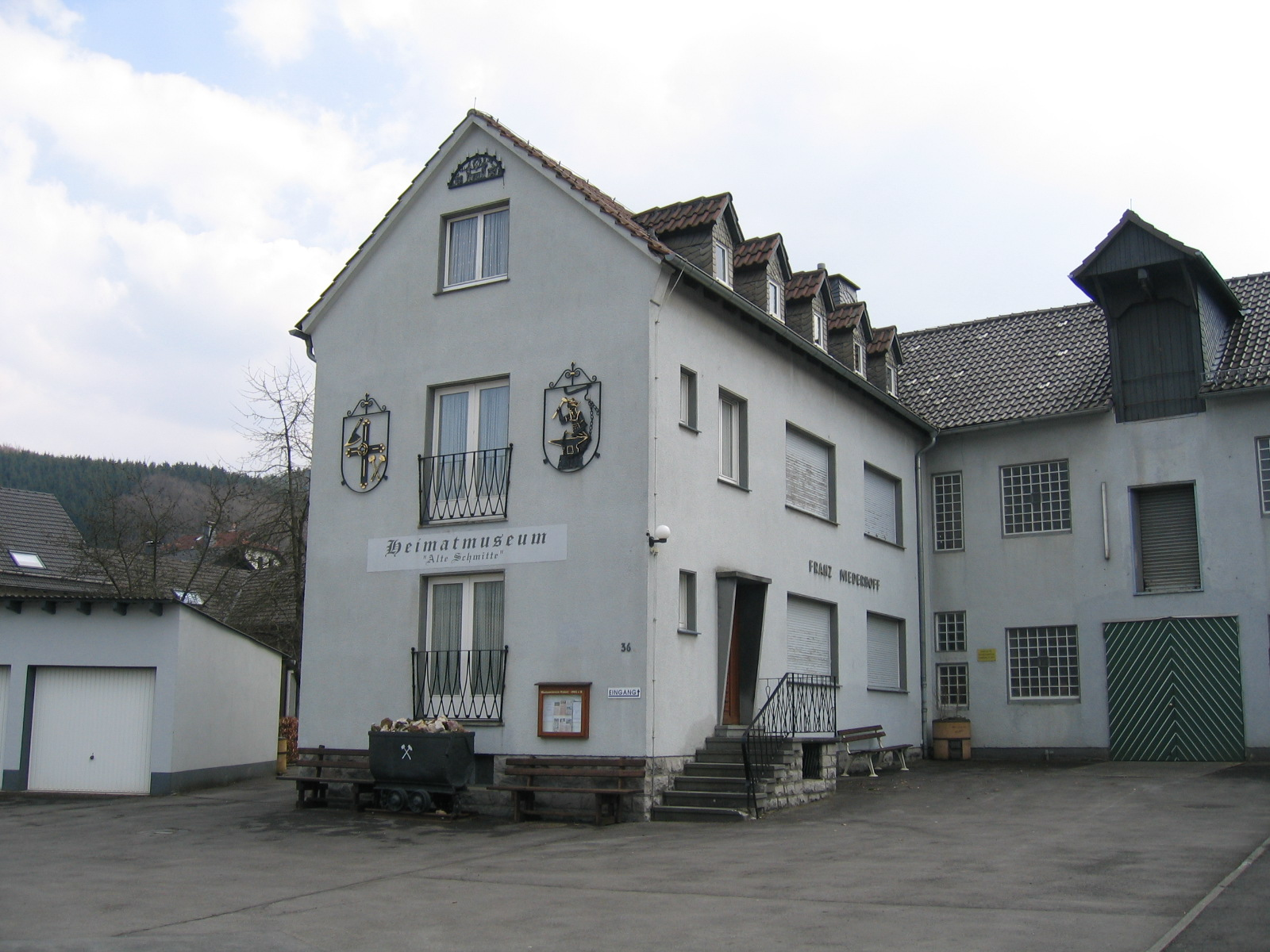
Die "Alte Schmitte"

== Division of the village ==
Endorf consists of 8 small villages which together build a subdivision of Sundern:

- Bönkhausen
- Brenschede
- Endorf
- Endorferhütte
- Kloster Brunnen
- Röhrenspring
- Gehren
- Recklinghausen

== History ==
Endorf was first mentioned in 1191. In the past, it was agrarian oriented. It has its blossom of mining in the 18th century.
