= Sundern-Allendorf =

Coordinates: 51.2850°N 7.9546°E

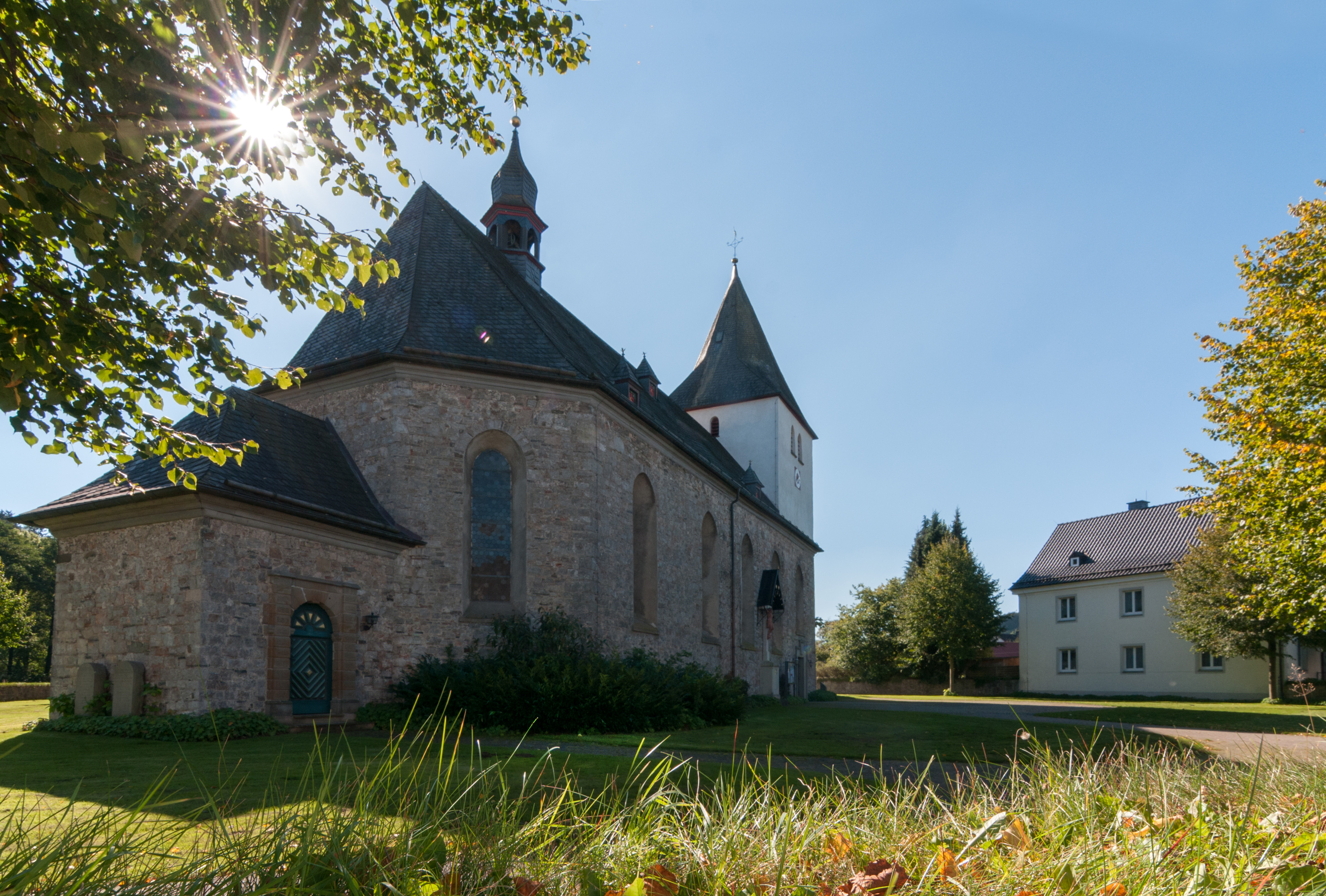

Allendorf is an Ortschaft (subdivision) of the town of Sundern in the Hochsauerland district of North Rhine-Westphalia, Germany. Allendorf has about 1678 residents, and it is at 320 meters above sea level. It is south of the municipality, to the south of Langscheid, not far from the town of Plettenberg, between Selbecke and a reservoir.
