= Linnepe =

River in Germany

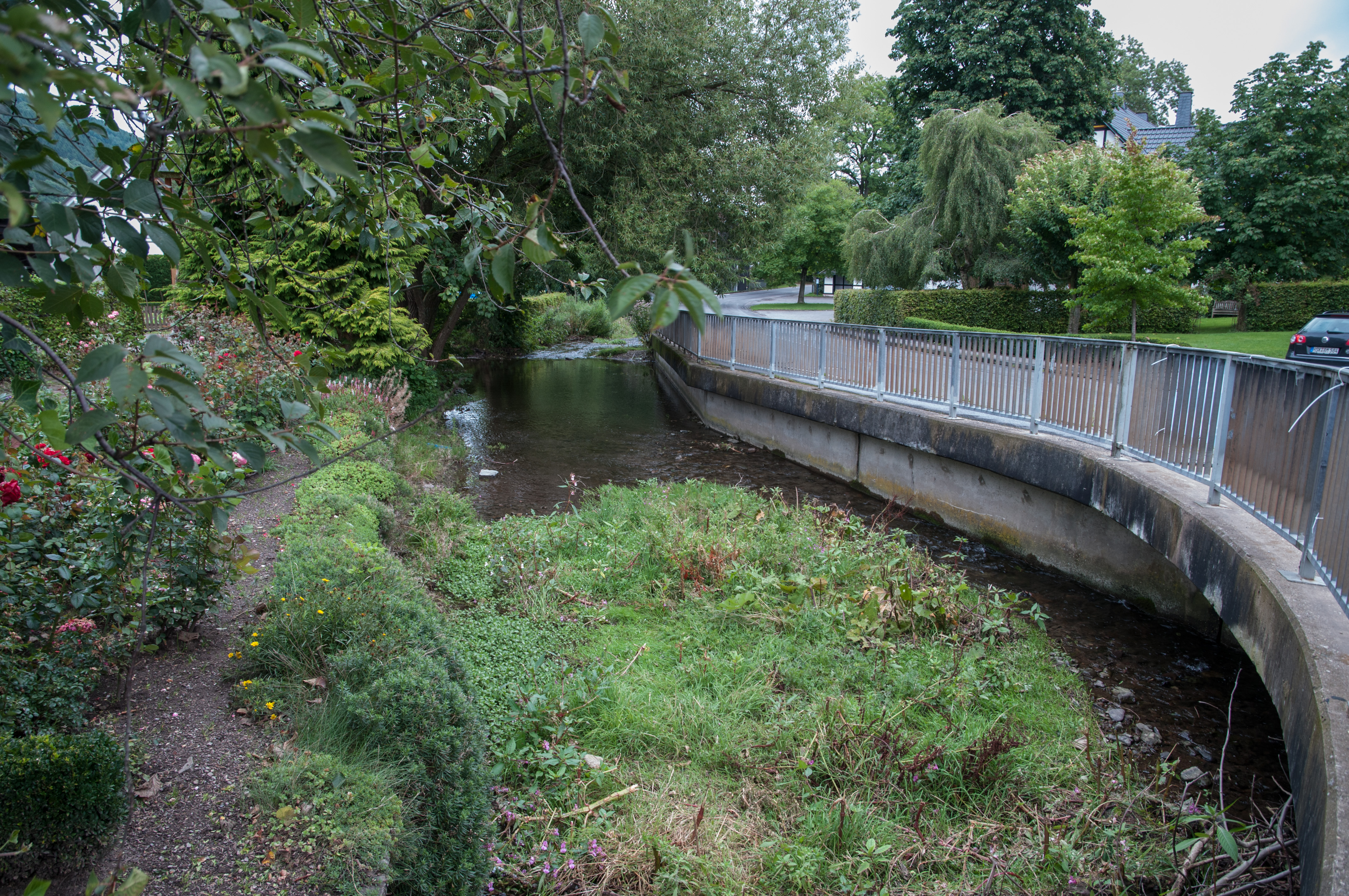

Location
- Country: Germany
- State: North Rhine-Westphalia

Physical characteristics
- Mouth
  - location: Röhr
  - coordinates: 51.3294°N 8.0054°E
- Length: 14.3 km (8.9 mi)

Basin features
- Progression: Röhr→ Ruhr→ Rhine→ North Sea

Linnepe (German pronunciation: [ˈlɪnəpə]) is a river of North Rhine-Westphalia, Germany. It flows into the Röhr in Sundern.

== See also ==
- List of rivers of North Rhine-Westphalia
