= Sorpe (Röhr) =

River in Germany

Location
- Country: Germany
- State: North Rhine-Westphalia

Physical characteristics
- Mouth
  - location: Röhr
  - coordinates: 51.3682°N 7.9787°E
- Length: 18.6 km (11.6 mi)

Basin features
- Progression: Röhr→ Ruhr→ Rhine→ North Sea

Sorpe (German pronunciation: [ˈzɔʁpə]) is a river of Hochsauerlandkreis, North Rhine-Westphalia, western Germany. It is a left (western) tributary of the Röhr, which is a tributary of the Ruhr, a tributary of the Rhine.

The Sorpe Dam is located on the Sorpe forming the Sorpe Reservoir. It is located near the small town of Sundern.

== See also ==
- List of rivers of North Rhine-Westphalia
