= Röhr (river) =

River in Germany

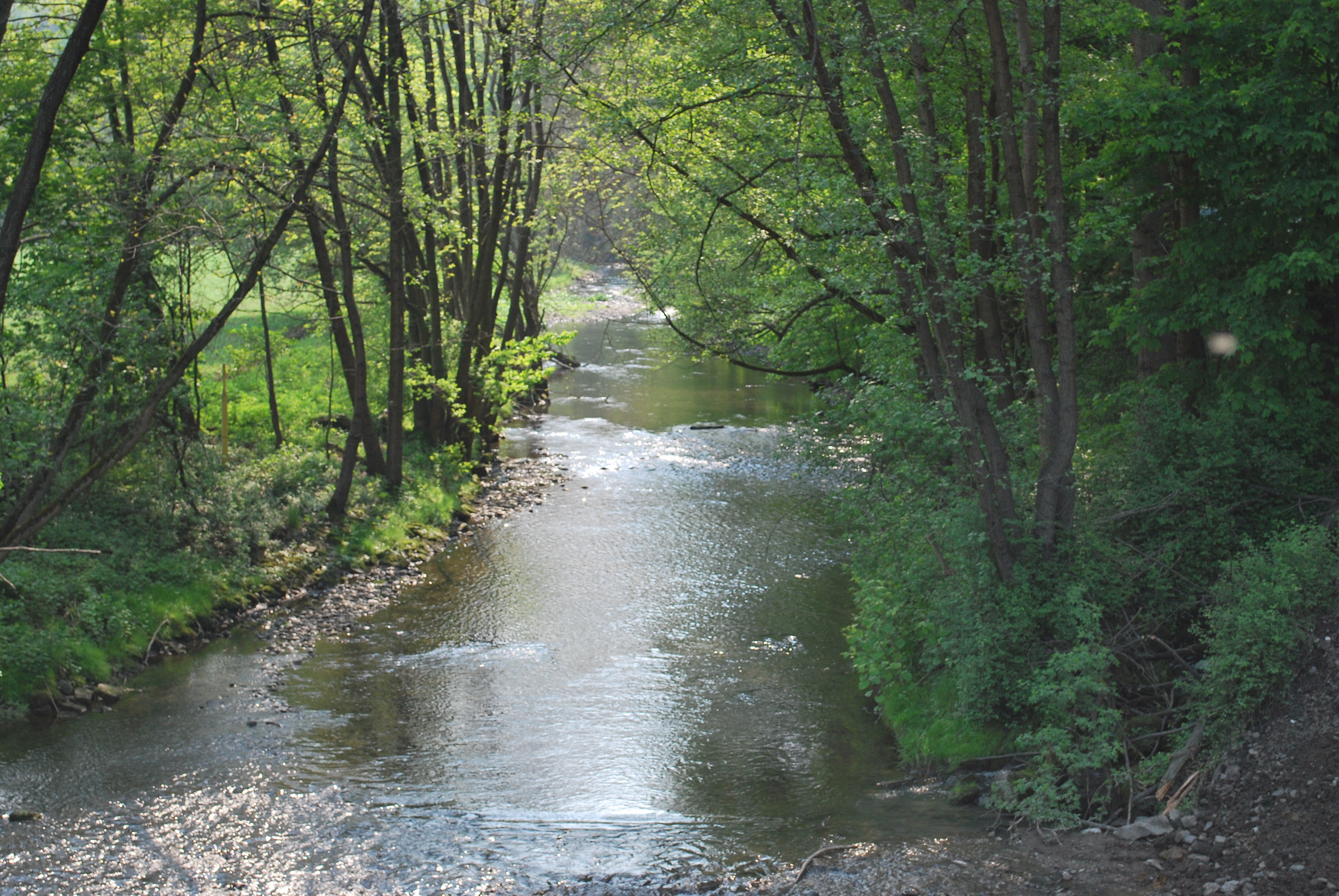

Location
- Country: Germany
- State: North Rhine-Westphalia

Physical characteristics
- Mouth
  - location: Ruhr
  - coordinates: 51.4344°N 7.9908°E
- Length: 28.9 km (18.0 mi)
- Basin size: 203 km^{2} (78 sq mi)

Basin features
- Progression: Ruhr→ Rhine→ North Sea
- Tributaries
  - left: Sorpe
  - right: Linnepe

Röhr (German pronunciation: [ˈʁøːɐ̯]) is a river of North Rhine-Westphalia, Germany. It is a left tributary of the Ruhr river, itself a tributary of the Rhine. It flows into the Ruhr in Arnsberg-Hüsten.

It has the following main tributaries:

- The Sorpe is a left tributary stream of the Röhr, in Hochsauerlandkreis.
- The Linnepe is a right tributary stream of the Röhr, also in Hochsauerlandkreis.

== See also ==
- Sorpe Dam
- List of rivers of North Rhine-Westphalia
