= Sundern =

- Town
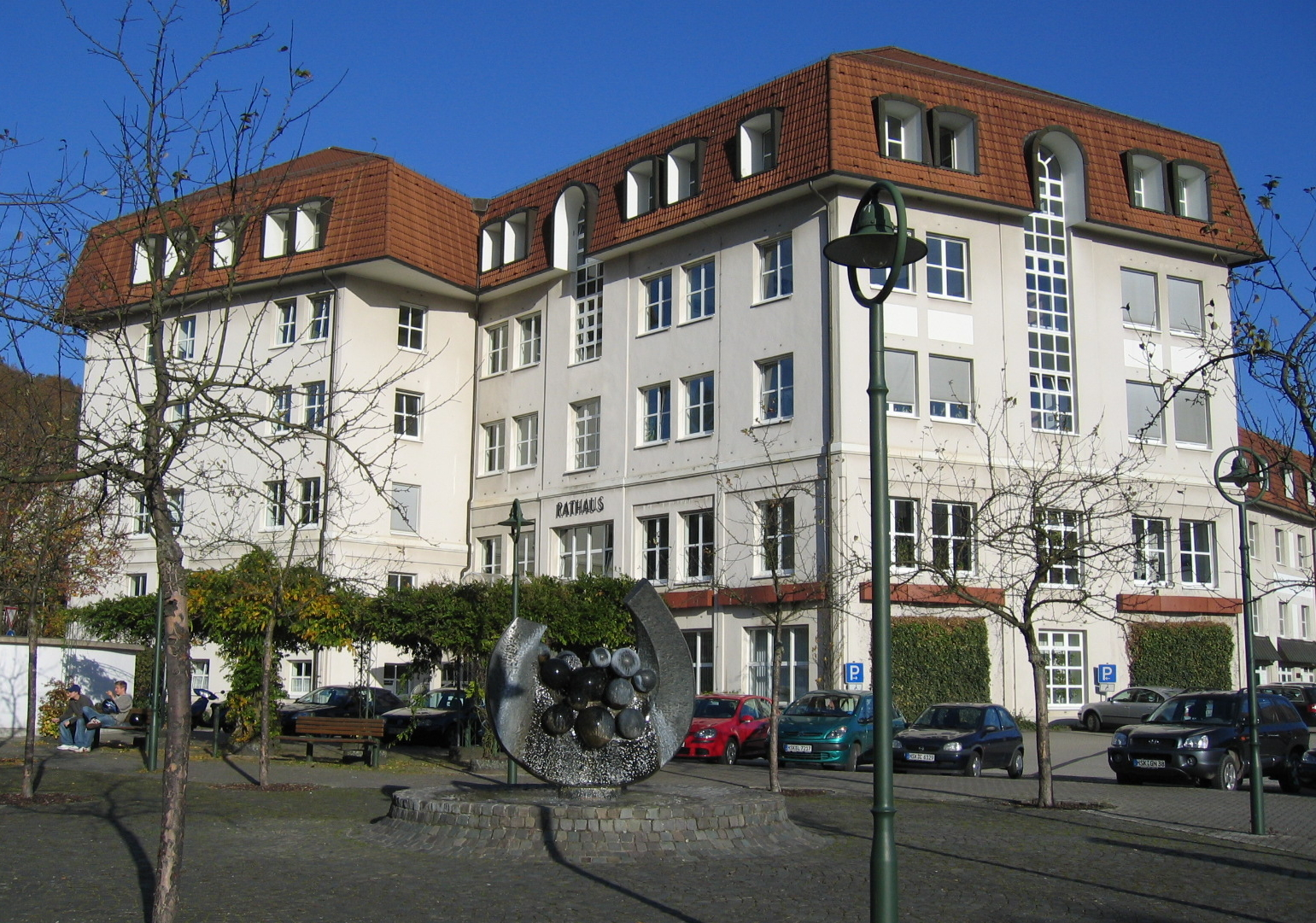
- Townhall of Sundern

- Coat of arms

- Location of Sundern within Hochsauerlandkreis district
- Interactive map of Sundern
- Location within Germany Location within North Rhine-Westphalia
- Coordinates: 51°19′N 08°00′E
- Country: Germany
- State: North Rhine-Westphalia
- Admin. region: Arnsberg
- District: Hochsauerlandkreis
- Subdivisions: 18

Government
  - Mayor (2020–25): Klaus-Rainer Willeke (SPD)

Area
  - Total: 193.27 km^{2} (74.62 sq mi)
- Elevation: 195–648 m (640–2,126 ft)

Population (2025-12-31)
  - Total: 27,490
  - Density: 142.2/km^{2} (368.4/sq mi)
- Time zone: UTC+01:00 (CET)
  - Summer (DST): UTC+02:00 (CEST)
- Postal codes: 59846
- Dialling codes: 02933, 02934, 02935, 02393, 02395, 02724
- Vehicle registration: HSK
- Website: www.sundern.de

Sundern (German pronunciation: [ˈzʊndɐn]) is a town in the Hochsauerland district, in North Rhine-Westphalia, Germany. The name Sundern is common in Westphalia, as it means "ground given away for private usage" in the Westphalian dialect.

== Geography ==
Sundern is situated approximately 10 km (6 mi) south-west of Arnsberg. Around Sundern extends the nature park Homert which attracts tourists, many from the Netherlands. Winter tourism is also substantial, primarily in the municipality Wildewiese with its skiing area. The Sorpesee, an artificial lake, is used by watersportsmen, campers and fishermen.

=== Neighbouring municipalities ===
- Arnsberg
- Balve
- Eslohe
- Finnentrop
- Meschede
- Neuenrade
- Plettenberg

=== Division of the town ===
Sundern consists of 16 Ortschaften (subdivisions):

- Allendorf
- Altenhellefeld
- Amecke
- Endorf
- Enkhausen
- Hachen
- Hagen
- Hellefeld
- Hövel
- Langscheid
- Linnepe
- Meinkenbracht
- Stemel
- Stockum
- Sundern
- Westenfeld

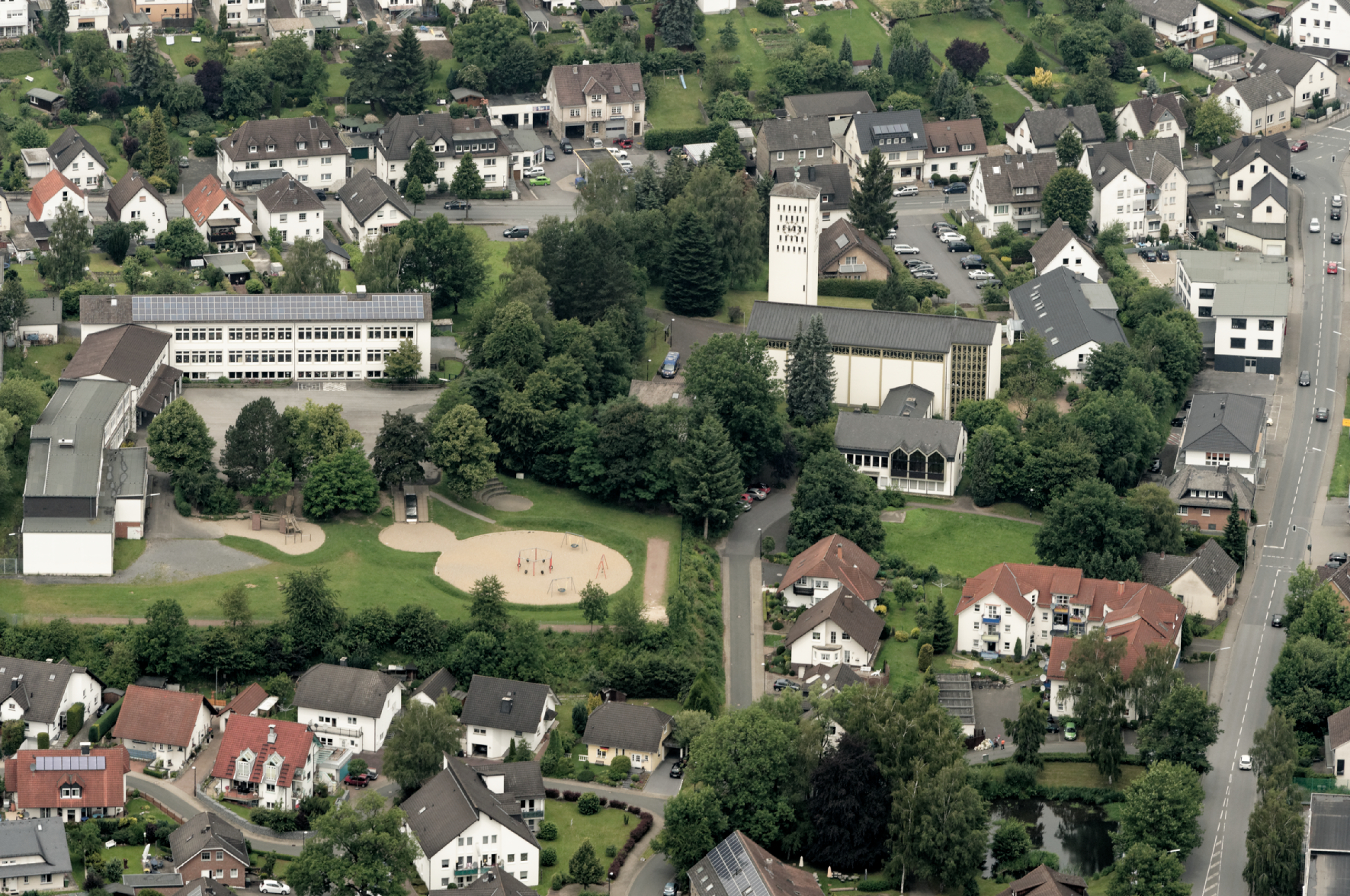
Sundern Christkönigkirche

== Population ==
Historical population

Year	Pop.	±% p.a.
1965	21,799	—
1970	24,127	+2.05%
1975	25,167	+0.85%
1980	25,690	+0.41%
1985	25,140	−0.43%
1990	27,250	+1.62%
1995	29,368	+1.51%

Year	Pop.	±% p.a.
2000	29,867	+0.34%
2005	29,543	−0.22%
2010	28,730	−0.56%
2015	28,166	−0.40%
2020	27,554	−0.44%
2025	27,490	−0.05%

Source: Landesdatabank Nordrhein-Westfalen

== International relations ==
Sundern is twinned with:

- Benet (France)
- Schirgiswalde (Germany)
- Torfou (France)

== Architectural structures ==
- Schomberg Observation Tower

== Industry ==
The main industries of Sundern are several domestic and industrial lighting companies, household appliances and packaging businesses. SEVERIN Elektrogeräte GmbH has its headquarters in Sundern.

== Notable people ==
- William Danne, actor
- Joseph Machalke, priest
- Andrea Renzullo, singer and finalist in season 4 of "Das Supertalent"
- Heinrich Luebke, German President from 1959 to 1969, born in Enkhausen
