= List of rivers of Ostwestfalen-Lippe =

Coordinates: 52°13′17″N 8°49′43″E

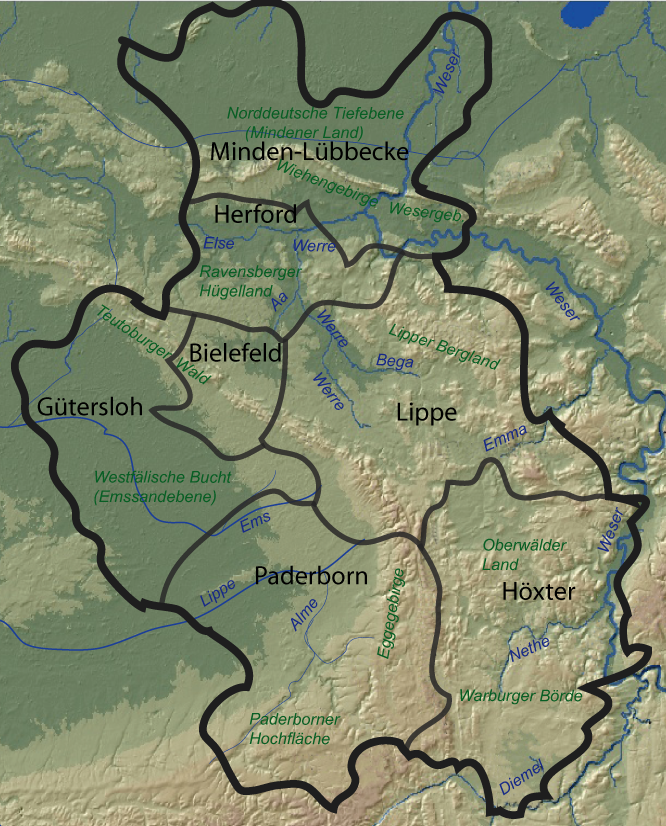
Main rivers of the region

This list of rivers and streams in Ostwestfalen-Lippe contains a selection of the rivers, streams and lakes which lie wholly or partly in Ostwestfalen-Lippe (OWL). The rivers are organised based on the Weser, Lippe and Ems river systems. In addition they are sometimes further divided into sub-regions. The list does not contain all named rivers in OWL, but at least all those with a total catchment area of 10 square kilometres. The list of lakes is also not a full list of all named lakes, especially as the distinction with ponds is not always clear.

== System ==
=== River or stream ===
System: River name (No., L/R, district)

- No: River number
- L/R: Left or right tributary
- District: districts passed (only OWL districts)
  - BI: Bielefeld
  - GT: Kreis Gütersloh
  - HF: Kreis Herford
  - HX: Kreis Höxter
  - LIP: Kreis Lippe
  - MI: Kreis Minden-Lübbecke
  - PB Kreis Paderborn

All tributaries are listed in downstream order in relation to their parent river. The tributaries are listed based on their ranking in the river system:

- 1st order (river discharges into the sea)
  - 2nd order (river discharges into a river, which discharges into the sea)
    - 3rd order (river discharges into a river, which discharges into a river, which discharges into the sea)
      - 4th order: analogous to the above

=== Lakes ===
System: Name (Parish, district, surface area, origin/type)

- District: see above
- Water surface area: in hectares
- Origin/Type: reservoir, gravel pit, Altwassersee, natural origin, etc.

The lakes are in order of size. If the lake is the largest in its district, the district name is in bold.

== Lippe → Rhine ==
=== Upper Lippe to its confluence with the Pader ===
- Rhine (not in OWL)
  - Lippe (2781, R, PB)
    - Schlänger Bach (27812, R, PB)
    - Steinbeke (27814, L, PB)
    - Beke (27816, L, PB)
      - Durbeke (278162, R, PB)

=== Pader → Lippe ===
- Rhine (not in OWL)
  - Lippe (2781, R, PB)
    - Pader (27818, L, PB)
      - Rothebach (278182, R, PB)
        - Springbach (2781822, L, PB)

=== Alme → Lippe ===
- Rhine (not in OWL)
  - Lippe (2781, R, PB)
    - Alme (2782, L, PB)
      - Nette (27822, R, PB)
        - Lühlingsbach (278222, L, PB)
      - Harlebach (278232, L, PB)
      - Afte (27824, R, PB)
        - Karpke (278242, L, PB)
        - Aa (278244, R, PB)
          - Kleine Aa
      - Talgosse (27826, L, PB)
      - Altenau (27828, R, PB)
        - Piepenbach (278282, L, PB)
        - Sauer (278284, R, PB)
          - Bach von Kleinenberg (2782842, R, PB)
          - Odenheimer Bach (2782844, R, PB)
          - Schmittwasser (2782846, R, PB)
        - Ellerbach (278286, R, PB)
        - Salenkruke (Rotenbach) (2782862, R, PB)
        - Finkenpuhl (2782864, L, PB)

=== Lippe between the Alme and the Glenne ===
- Rhine (not in OWL)
  - Lippe (2781, R, PB)
    - Thune (27832, R, PB)
      - Grimke (278324, R, PB)
    - Roter Bach (278332, R, PB)
      - Franzosenbach (2783322, R, PB)
    - Gunne-Elsen (278334, R, PB)
    - Gunne (27836, L, PB)
      - Erlbach (278362, RL, PB)
    - Heder (278372, R, PB)
      - Wellebach (2783722, L, PB)
    - Merschgraben (278392, R, PB)

=== Glenne → Lippe ===
- Rhine (not in OWL)
  - Lippe (2781, R, PB)
    - Glenne (Haustenbach) (2784, L, PB)
      - Knochenbach (278412, R, PB)
      - Krollbach (278414, R, PB)
      - Schwarzer Graben (27842, R, PB)
      - Kaltestrot (278454, R, PB)
      - Ochsengraben (Mentzelsfelder Kanal) (27848, L, PB)

== Ems → North Sea ==
=== Upper Ems to its confluence with the Dalke ===
- Ems (3, -, PB, GT)
  - Schwarzwasserbach (31112, L, PB)
    - Holtebach (311122, R, PB)
      - Hallerbach (3111222, R, PB)
  - Furlbach (3112, R, LIP, PB, GT)
    - Bärenbach (31122, L, GT)
  - Sennebach (3114, R, LIP, GT)
  - Grubebach (3116, L, GT)
    - Schwalenbach (Forthbach) (31164, L, GT)
  - Rothenbach (311712 dort Rothebach)
    - Merschgraben (3117122)
  - Eusternbach (31172, L, GT)
  - Hamelbach (3118, L, GT)

=== Dalke → Ems ===
- Ems (3, -, PB, GT)
  - Dalke (312, R, BI, GT)
    - Sprungbach (3122, L, BI)
    - Strothbach (31232, L, BI, GT)
    - Hasselbach (3124, R, BI, GT)
    - Menkebach (3126, L, LIP, BI, GT)
    - Wapelbach (3128, L, LIP, GT)
      - Rodenbach (31282, R, GT)
      - Großer Bastergraben (312836, R, GT)
      - Ölbach (31284, R, LIP, GT)
        - Westerholter Bach (312842, R, LIP, GT)
          - Schnakenbach (3128422, R, LIP, GT)
        - Landerbach (312844, R, LIP, GT)
          - Krampsbach (3128442, R, LIP, GT)
      - Knisterbach (312892, R, GT)

=== Ems between the Dalke and the Lutter ===
- Ems (3, -, PB, GT)
  - Ruthenbach (31312, L, GT)
  - Poggenbach (31314, L, GT)

=== Lutter → Ems ===
- Ems (3, -, PB, GT)
  - Lutter (3132, R, BI, GT)
    - Trüggelbach (31322, L, BI, GT)
    - Reiherbach (31324, L, BI, GT)
    - Krullsbach (313258, R, BI, GT)
    - Welplagebach (Reinkebach, Schlangenbach) (31326, L, GT)
    - Lichtebach (31328, R, BI, GT)

=== Ems between the Lutter and the Hessel ===
- Ems (3, -, PB, GT)
  - Abrooksbach (Landbach) (3134, R, GT)
    - Hovebach (31342, R, GT)
    - Reckbach (31344, L, GT)
  - Rhedaer Bach (3136, R, GT)
    - Kleinebach (313612, L, GT)
    - Künsebecker Bach (31362, L, GT)
    - Ellerbrockgraben (313692, L, GT)
    - Wippe (313698, L, GT)
  - Loddenbach (3138, R, BI, GT)
    - Ruthebach (31382, L, GT)
  - Axtbach (314, L, GT)
    - Maibach (3144, L, GT)
    - Beilbach (3146, L, (not in OWL))
    - Flutbach (31472, R, GT)
    - Südlicher Emstalgraben (Südlicher Graben) (31492, R, GT)
  - Jungferngraben (Nördlicher Talgraben) (3152, R, GT)

=== Hessel → Ems ===
- Ems (3, -, PB, GT)
  - Hessel (316, R, GT)
    - Casumer Bach (31612, R, GT)
      - Berghauser Bach (3161212, R, GT)
      - Pustmühlenbach (316122, L, GT)
    - Bruchbach (3162, R, GT)
      - Rolfbach (31622, L, GT)
      - Oberwiesengraben (31626, L, GT)
        - Halstenbecker Bach (31624, L, GT)
    - Alte Hessel (31632, L, GT)
    - Aabach (3164, R, GT)

== Weser → North Sea ==
=== Diemel → Weser ===
- Weser (4, -, HX, LIP, HF, MI)
  - Diemel (44, RL, GT)
    - Hammerbach (4436, L, HX)
      - Schwarzbach (44362, R, HX)
  - Mühlengraben (4438, RL, HX)
      - Naure (44382, L, HX)
      - Ohme (44384, L, HX)
    - Twiste (444, R, HX)
    - Eggel (4454, L, HX)
      - Mühlenbach (44542, L, HX)
      - Eder (44544, R, HX)
    - Vombach (44592, L, HX)
    - Alster (4472, L, HX)

=== Upper Weser between the Diemel and the Nethe ===
- Weser (4, -, HX, LIP, HF, MI)
  - Bever (4512, L, HX)
    - Eselsbach (45122, R, HX)

=== Nethe → Weser ===
- Weser (4, -, HX, LIP, HF, MI)
  - Nethe (452, L, HX)
    - Helmerte (45216, R, HX)
    - Taufnethe (4522, R, HX)
    - Öse (4524, L, HX)
    - Aa (4526, L; PB, HX)
      - Hilgenbach (45262, L, HX)
      - Katzbach (45264, L, HX)
    - Brucht (4528, R, HX)
      - Emderbach (45282, R, HX)
        - Grundbach (452822, L, HX)
      - Hakesbach (45286, L, HX)
    - Silberbach (45294, R, HX)

=== Upper Weser between the Nethe and the Emmer ===
- Weser (4, -, HX, LIP, HF, MI)
  - Grube (4534, L, HX)
    - Fischbach (45344, R, HX)
  - Schelpe (45352, L, HX)
  - Saumer (45354, L, HX)
  - Twierbach (45372, L, HX)
  - Lonaubach (45392, L, HX, LIP)
    - Spiekersiek (453924, L, LIP)

=== Emmer → Weser ===
- Weser (4, -, HX, LIP, HF, MI)
  - Emmer (456, L, HX, LIP)
    - Fischbach (Emmer) (45612, L, HX)
    - Mühlenbach (45614, R, HX)
    - Beberbach (4562, R, HX)
      - Röthe (45624, L, LIP)
    - Heubach (4564, R, LIP, HX)
      - Silberbach (45642, L, LIP)
    - Napte (45652, L, LIP)
    - Diestelbach (4566, L, LIP)
      - Königsbach (45662, R, LIP)
        - Istruper Bach (456624, L, LIP)
    - Niese (4568, R, HX, LIP)
      - Kleinenbredener Bach (45684, L, HX)
    - Wörmke (45694, R, LIP)
      - Ilsenbach (456942, L, HX, LIP)
    - Eschenbach (45696, L, LIP)

=== Upper Weser between the Emmer and the Werre ===
- Weser (4, -, HX, LIP, HF, MI)
  - Humme (4574, L, LIP)
    - Grießbach (457421, R, LIP)
    - Beberbach (45744, L, LIP)
  - Exter (458, L, LIP)
    - Alme (4584, L, LIP)
    - Twiesbach (4592, R, MI )
  - Herrengraben (4594, L, LIP)
  - Kalle (4596, L, LIP)
    - Westerkalle (Kallbach) (45962, L, LIP)
  - Forellenbach (4598, L, HF)
    - Linnenbeeke (45982, R, HF)
  - Borstenbach (45992, L, HF)

=== Werre → Weser ===
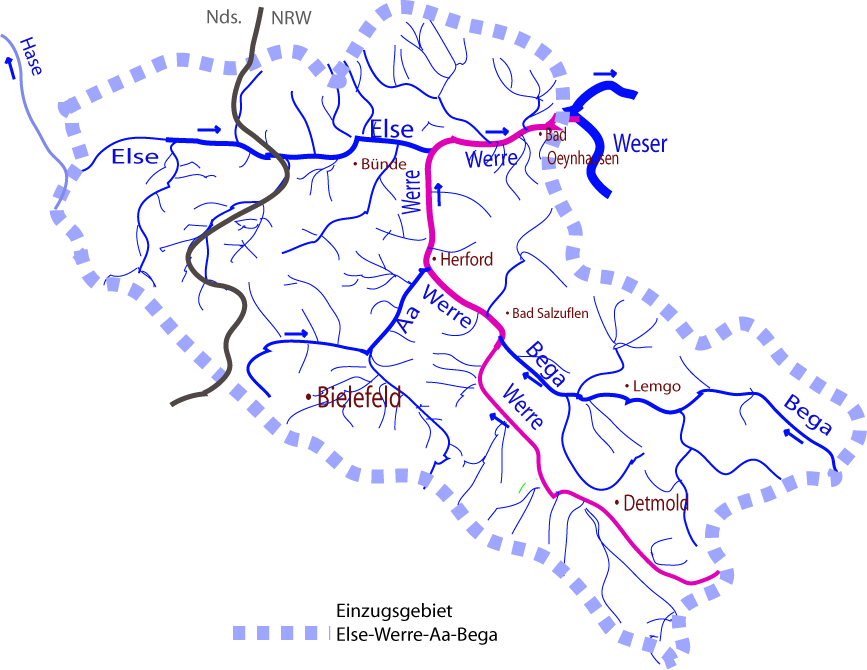
Map of the river system of the Werre

==== Upper Werre to its confluence with the Bega ====
- Weser (4, -, HX, LIP, HF, MI)
  - Werre (46, L, LIP, HF, MI)
    - Steinbach (-, R, LIP)
    - Strangbach (-, L, LIP)
      - Wedasch (-, R, LIP)
    - Wörbke (46114, R, LIP)
      - Diestelbach (-, R, LIP)
    - Wiembecke (4612, L, LIP)
      - Berlebecke (Wiggenbach, Knochenbach) (46124, L, LIP)
    - Rethlager Bach (4616, L, LIP)
    - Rothenbach (46172, L, LIP)
    - Haferbach (4618, L, LIP)
      - Krebsbach (461816, L, LIP)
      - Gruttbach (46182, R, LIP)
    - Bentgraben (46192, L, LIP)
    - Heipker Bach (46194, L, LIP)
    - Siekbach (46196 L, LIP)
    - Bexter (46198, L, LIP)

==== Bega → Werre ====
- Weser (4, -, HX, LIP, HF, MI)
  - Werre (46, L, LIP, HF, MI)
    - Bega (462, R, LIP)
      - Hillbach (46214, R, LIP)
      - Passade (4622, L, LIP)
        - Marpe (46224, R, LIP)
      - Linnebach (46232, L, LIP)
      - Ilse (4624, R, LIP)
        - Niederluher Bach (46242, L, LIP)
      - Ötternbach (4626, L, LIP)
      - Rhienbach (46272, R, LIP)
        - Sudbach (462725, R, LIP)
      - Salze (4628, R, HF, LIP)
        - Glimke (46282, L, HF, LIP)

==== Aa → Werre ====
- Weser (4, -, HX, LIP, HF, MI)
  - Werre (46, L, LIP, HF, MI)
    - Aa (Johannisbach) (464, R, BI, HF)
      - Schwarzbach (4642, L, GT, BI)
        - Mühlenbach (464216, R, GT, BI)
        - Hasbach (464218, R, GT, BI)
        - Beckendorfer Mühlenbach (46422, L, HF, BI)
      - Schloßhofbach (46432, R, BI)
        - Sudbrackbach (464322, R, BI)
      - Jöllenbecker Mühlenbach (46452, L, BI, HF)
      - Lutterbach (Lutter) (4646, R, BI)
        - Baderbach (464612, R, BI)
        - Windwehe (46462, R, BI, LIP)
          - Oldentruper Bach (464628, R, BI)
      - Eickumer Mühlenbach (Kinsbeke) (4648, L, BI, HF)

==== Werre between the Aa and the Else ====
- Weser (4, -, HX, LIP, HF, MI)
  - Werre (46, L, LIP, HF, MI)
    - Düsedieksbach (4652, L, HF)
      - Lippinghauser Bach (46524, L, HF)
    - Bramschebach (4654, R, HF)

==== Else → Werre ====
- Weser (4, -, HX, LIP, HF, MI)
  - Werre (46, L, LIP, HF, MI)
    - Else (466, 3, R, HF)
      - Laerbach (not in OWL)
        - Steinbach (466212, R, GT)
      - Violenbach (4664, R, GT)
      - Kilverbach (46654, L, HF)
      - Warmenau (4666, R, HF, GT)
        - Spenger Mühlenbach (46664, R, HF, GT)
      - Darmühlenbach (46672, L, HF)
      - Neue Else (46674, R, HF)
        - Werfener Bach (466742, R, HF)
      - Gewinghauser Bach (46676, L, HF)
      - Brandbach (Bolldambach) (4668, R, HF)
      - Ostbach (46679X, L, MI, HF)

==== Lower Werre after its confluence with the Else ====
- Weser (4, -, HX, LIP, HF, MI)
  - Werre (46, L, LIP, HF, MI)
    - Rehmerloh-Mennighüffer Mühlenbach (468, L, HF, MI)
      - Tengerner Bach (4684, L, MI)
        - Schnathorster Bach (46842, R, MI)
        - Mühlenbach (46884, R, MI)
    - Mittelbach (4694, R, HF, MI)
    - Kaarbach (Wulferdingser Bach) (46992, L, MI)

=== Middle Weser between the Werre and Große Aue ===
- Weser (4, -, HX, LIP, HF, MI)
  - Meierbach (471312, L, MI)
  - Dehmer Mühlenbach (47132, L, MI)
  - Bastau (4714, L, MI)
    - Flöthe (47142, L, MI)
      - Ronceva (L, MI)
    - Bastau-Entlaster (47148, L, MI)
  - Osterbach (47192, R, MI)
  - (Bückeburger) Aue (472, R, MI)
    - Sandfurthbach (4726, L, MI)
  - Ösper (4732, L, MI)
  - Rottbach (Weser) (4734, L, MI)
  - Gehle (474, R, MI)
    - Ils (4744, R, MI)
    - Riehe (4746, L, MI)

=== Große Aue → Weser ===
- Weser (4, -, HX, LIP, HF, MI)
  - Große Aue (476, L, MI)
    - Mehner Bach (47612, R, MI)
    - Flöthe (47614, R, MI)
    - Kleine Aue (47618, R, MI)
      - Braune Aue (476182, R, MI)
    - Großer Dieckfluss (4762, L, MI)
      - Hollwedener Graben (476216, L, MI)
      - Twiehauser Bach (476218, R, MI)
      - Fehrnwiesen Graben (47622, L, MI)
      - Kleiner Dieckfluss (47624, R, MI)
      - Tielger Bruchgraben (47626, L, MI)
    - Wickriede (4764, R, MI)
      - Flöthe (47644, R, MI)
      - Langenhorster Graben (476454, L, MI)
      - Kleine Wickriede (47646, R, MI)

=== Weser, north of the Große Aue ===
- Weser (4, -, HX, LIP, HF, MI)
  - Steinhuder Meerbach (R, not in OWL)
    - Fulde (4782, L, MI)
    - Steertschlaggraben (47832, L MI)

=== Hunte → Weser ===
- Weser (4, -, HX, LIP, HF, MI)
  - Hunte (R, not in OWL)
    - Wimmerbach (4961129, R, MI) (not in OWL)
      - Heithöfer Bach (4961124, LR, MI)
        - Schröttinghauser Bach (4961124, R, MI)
    - Grenz Canal (496114, R, MI)
    - Ompteda Canal (496261, L, not in OWL)
      - Brockumer Pissing (496262, L, MI)

Remark: In the catchment area of the Hunte the streams listed are often just drainage ditches or canals, that cannot be of thecribed using the usual hierarchy of a classic river system with main rivers and tributaries, because there is no constant direction of flow. As a result it is only ansatzweise angedeutet, how the waterbody is linked to its main river.

== Shipping canals ==
- Mittelland Canal with Minden Aqueduct and access to the Weser

== Lakes ==
1. Aabachsee (Bad Wünnenberg, PB, 180 ha, Stausee) (teilweise in OWL)
2. Lippesee (Paderborn, PB, 103 ha, Stau- and Baggersee)
3. Alter See-Mittlerer See-Neuer See (Großer Weserbogen) (Porta Westfalica, MI, 90 ha, Baggersee / Altwassersee)
4. Schiedersee (Emmerstausee) (Schieder-Schwalenberg, LIP, 82 ha, Stausee)
5. Rietberger Fischteiche (Teichanlage bestehend aus 27 verbundenen Teichen, Rietberg, GT, 49,9 ha, Fischteiche/ Gräfte)
6. Hochwasserrückhaltebecken Keddinghausen (Büren, PB, 47,5 ha, Stausee)
7. Heddinghauser See (Paderborn, PB, 36 ha)
8. Nesthauser See (Paderborn, PB, 30 ha, Baggersee)
9. Mastholter See (Benteler See) (Rietberg, GT, 26 ha, Baggersee)
10. Stemmer See (Kalletal, LIP, 25 ha, Altwassersee)
11. Rathsee (Paderborn, PB, 25 ha)
12. Bentfelder See (Paderborn, PB, 24 ha)
13. Obersee (Johannisbachtalsperre) (Bielefeld, BI, 20 ha, Stausee)
14. Mühlensee (Paderborn, PB, 15 ha)
15. Altensenner See (Paderborn, PB, 13 ha)
16. Axelsee (Beverungen, HX, 12 ha, Altwassersee)
17. Lintler See (Gütersloh, GT, 12 ha)
18. Hücker Moor (Spenge, HF, 11 ha)
19. Emssee (Rietberg, GT, 11 ha)
20. Norderteich (Horn- Bad Meinberg, LIP, 11 ha)
21. Meschesee (Detmold, LIP, 9 ha)
22. Padersee (Paderborn, PB, 7,8 ha)
23. Großer Auesee (Espelkamp, MI, 4,5 ha)
24. Oberlübber Bergsee (Hille, MI, 0,8 ha, ehemaliger Steinbruch)
