= Verl =

- Town
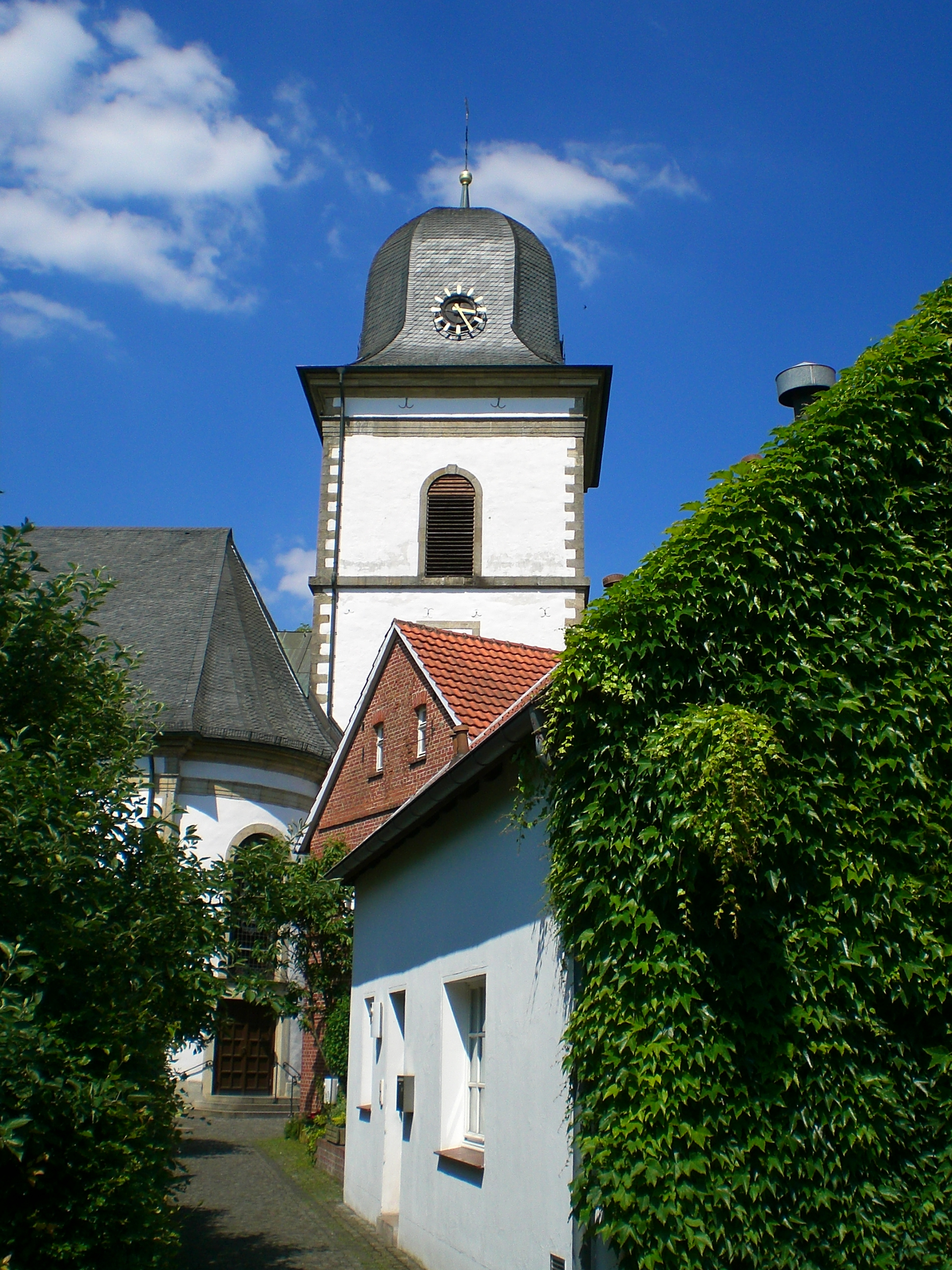
- St. Anna Church in Verl

- Flag Coat of arms

- Location of Verl within Gütersloh district
- Interactive map of Verl
- Location within Germany Location within North Rhine-Westphalia
- Coordinates: 51°52′59″N 08°31′00″E
- Country: Germany
- State: North Rhine-Westphalia
- Admin. region: Detmold
- District: Gütersloh
- Subdivisions: 5

Government
  - Mayor (2020–25): Robin Rieksneuwöhner (CDU)

Area
  - Total: 71.37 km^{2} (27.56 sq mi)
- Elevation: 85 m (279 ft)

Population (2025-12-31)
  - Total: 25,574
  - Density: 358.3/km^{2} (928.1/sq mi)
- Time zone: UTC+01:00 (CET)
  - Summer (DST): UTC+02:00 (CEST)
- Postal codes: 33415
- Dialling codes: 05246
- Vehicle registration: GT
- Website: www.verl.de

Verl (German: [fɛʁl]) is a town in the district of Gütersloh in the state of North Rhine-Westphalia, Germany. It is approximately 15 km south of Bielefeld and 10 km east of Gütersloh.

== Geography ==
Verl is located in Ostwestfalen-Lippe in a triangle formed by Gütersloh (9.2 km), Bielefeld (15.4 km), and Paderborn (25.1 km). The administrative region for the town is Detmold. The urban area for the town is located in the large landscape area of the North German Plain, in a subarea of the Westphalian Lowland.

The rivers that cross through the town are the Dalke, Menkebach, Ellbach, Sennebach, Furlbach, and Wapelbach streams. The Ellbach is joined by the Landerbach while the Wapelbach is joined by the Rodenbach. The Sennebach drains directly into the Ems, into which all the streams that cross through Verl flow northeast/southwest from the Teutoburg Forest. To protect nearby towns from flooding, a flood basin called Wapelbecken I was established in 2011, followed by Wapelbecken II in 2023.

The town covers an area of 71.36 km². The majority of the town's area consists of agricultural land, buildings, and open spaces, together accounting for approximately 86%, followed by forest and traffic areas, accounting for approximately 8.5%. Verl is sparsely forested compared to the rest of the Gütersloh district, with a forest cover of only around 6.4%.

== History ==
The name Verl was first mentioned in the expression 'Henricus de Verlo', which can be found in a charter from 1264. The designation probably relates to the farm estate Meier zu Verl, which belonged to a group of four estates that presumably came into existence around the turn of the first millennium. Some earlier documented references to estates in this area can be dated back to the year 1188.

In 1512, a chapel was built in the farming community. This chapel was turned into a parish church in 1577 and, since then, has marked the social center for the communities of Verl, Sende and Bornholte. Count Wenzel Anton von Kaunitz-Rietberg sponsored the building of the church of St. Anna at the location of the former chapel in 1792. The construction of this classical hall church was completed in 1801.

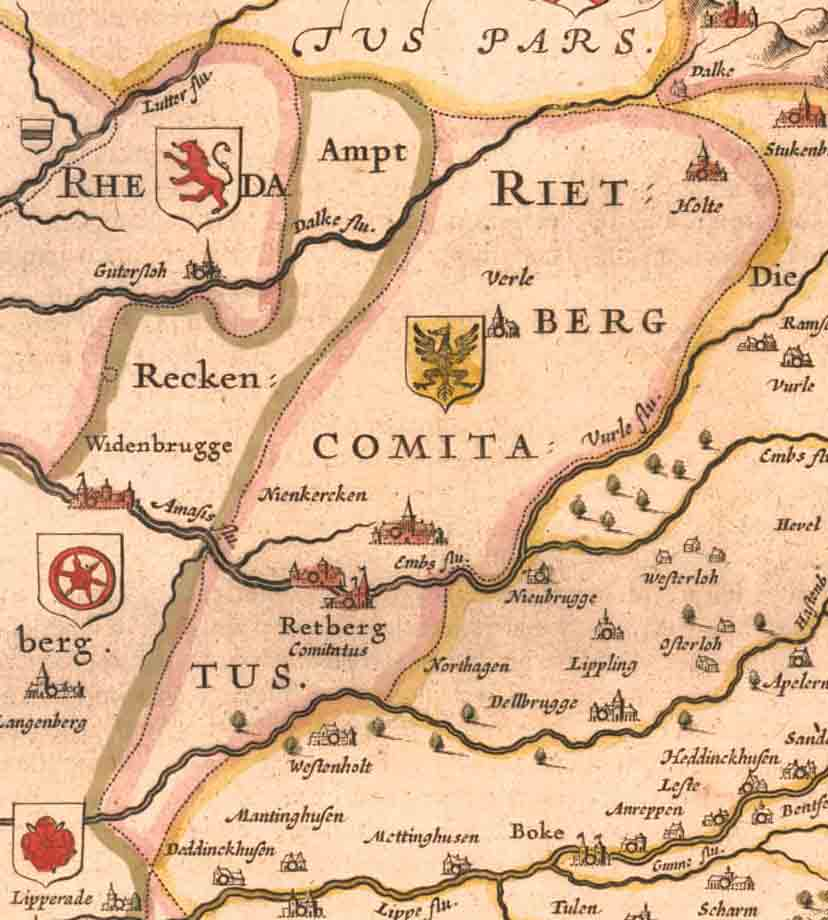
County of Rietberg showing Latin "Verle" at upper middle

Until the establishment of the Kingdom of Westphalia in 1807 during the Napoleonic period, Verl belonged to the County of Rietberg. From 1807 on, the county was divided into two administrative districts (called cantons) -- Rietberg and Neuenkirchen—comprising the now independent municipalities of Verl, Bornholte, Sende, Liemke, and Österwiehe. After the Congress of Vienna in 1815, the districts where incorporated into the newly created district of Wiedenbrück.

On July 1, 1838, the canton administration was moved from Neuenkirchen to Verl and, in addition to the aforementioned municipalities, the village of Kaunitz was added to the newly created canton of Verl. With the introduction of a new local government code in the Kingdom of Prussia on October 31, 1841, the canton's name was changed to Amt Verl (meaning department). By this time, Verl already had 6,786 inhabitants.

During World War I, more than 350 citizens fell victim to the conflict, and the ensuing aftermath left the district in economic struggle. After the Nazi seizure of power, the town square was renamed to "Hindenburg-Hitler-Platz" as part of a campaign of name changes across the country. The name remained until the fall of Nazi Germany.

Another adjustment to the local government code was carried out on January 1, 1970, constituting the current city limits. Now simply called Verl, the municipality consists of five administrative units (Verl, Bornholte, Sürenheide, Sende, and Kaunitz) and belongs to the district of Gütersloh. Verl is a town as of 1 January 2010. In 2017, the town was declared "culturally significant" by the LWL-Geodaten Kultur organization.

== Culture ==
=== Musical festivities ===
In the town, the Verl Music Association hosts an annual concert every January. At the Verl Comprehensive School's Pedagogical Center, the brass band presents an annual program of marching band, polka, and samba performances, as well as films and musical hits. Since 1970, the Verl Kolping Theater has performed a play annually. Every spring, for two weeks, the school's auditorium is transformed into a small theater.

=== Places of interest ===
- St. Anna Church
- Timbered houses from the 16th century
- Flea market "Hobbymarkt" - one of the largest flea markets in Germany, every first Saturday of the month
- Verl Button Museum - founded in a former print building in 2014
- Village Mill - Oldest mill in the Verl municipal area, listed as an architectural monument since 1991

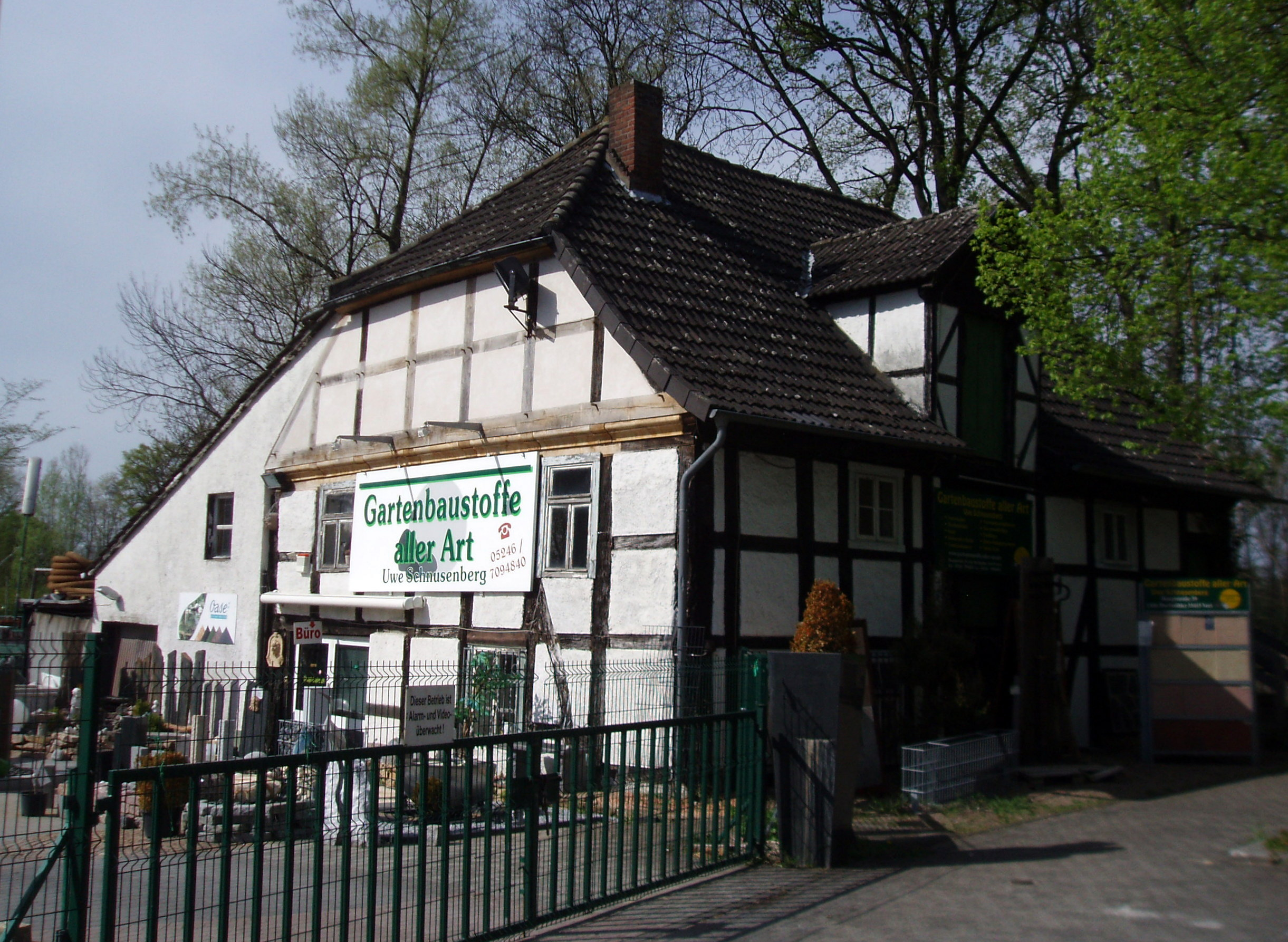
Verl Village Mill

== Sport ==
SC Verl, an association football club, was founded on 6 September 1924, and since 1970 has consistently played in the higher echelons of amateur football. The club was promoted to the professional national third division in 2020 where it has played ever since.

In the town, twelve different homing pigeon clubs are represented as of 2006.

In 2021, the town of Verl applied to be a host city for an international program as part of the 2023 Special Olympics World Summer Games in Berlin. For the occasion of the Olympics, the town was selected to host the Honduran chapter of Special Olympics International. The delegation consisted of 25 people and were to stay in the city for four days total.

== Sister cities ==
Verl has sister city relationships with the following two cities:

- Annaburg, Saxony-Anhalt, Germany (1990)
- Delphos, Ohio, United States (1999)

The sister relationship with Annaburg was established in 1990, shortly after the Fall of the Berlin Wall. In the first few years of the relationship, Verl assisted Annaburg in finding a new administration, which would eventually help create new connections between the two cities.

The sister relationship was Delphos was founded in 1999. The town was founded in the 1800s by pastor Johannes Otto Bredeick, a native of Verl, after a period of famine had struck North Rhine-Westphalia. Periodic visits and a student exchange happen between the two towns every year since the sister relationship went into effect.

== Demographics ==
Historical population
Year	Pop.	±%
1849	7,144	—
1871	7,245	+1.4%
1890	7,633	+5.4%
1910	9,811	+28.5%
1930	12,566	+28.1%
1938	14,324	+14.0%
1948	18,432	+28.7%
1956	20,396	+10.7%
1969	26,497	+29.9%
Population for Amt Verl

After the recognition of the Verl Municipality in the 1970s, parts of Amt Verl were incorporated into Schloß Holte-Stukenbrock or Bielefeld, drastically reducing its area and population size.

Historical population

Year	Pop.	±% p.a.
1965	14,019	—
1970	15,712	+2.31%
1975	17,194	+1.82%
1980	18,398	+1.36%
1985	18,508	+0.12%
1990	19,771	+1.33%
1995	21,626	+1.81%

Year	Pop.	±% p.a.
2000	23,315	+1.52%
2005	24,754	+1.21%
2010	24,984	+0.19%
2015	25,512	+0.42%
2020	25,382	−0.10%
2025	25,574	+0.15%

Population data refer to the area corresponding with the municipality as of 2025.
Source: Landesdatabank Nordrhein-Westfalen

=== Religion ===
In the town, the St. Anna Catholic Church merged with the St. Maria Immaculata of Kaunitz and the Church of St. Judas Thaddäus in 2001. As of the most recent 2022 census, 44.7% of the town's population was Roman Catholic while 17.1% were Protestant; the remaining 38.2% declared other religious affiliations or none.

Verl is also a stronghold of Germany's Assyrian community, the majority of whom belong to the Syriac Orthodox Church. Several associations, such as Suryoye Verl, operate to represent the town's Assyrian community. The town also has a New Apostolic Church and a Baptist house for worship.

== Politics ==
=== Coat of arms ===
In 1970, the council of the newly formed municipality of Verl decided to enact a coat of arms and banner. The coat of arms of the town of Verl is divided into four areas. In the center of the coat of arms is a golden shield. The first and fourth areas of the coat of arms contain a green background with silver oak trees with two golden acorns, while the second and third contain the same imagery with opposite coloration. On the coat of arms of the District of Verl are five diamonds that represent the five municipalities belonging to Amt Verl in the Prussian Kingdom; Verl, Bornholt, Senden, Liemke, and Österwiehe.

Town of Verl Coat of Arms

Town banner

Town flag

District of Verl Coat of Arms

=== Logo ===
Since 2014, the town of Verl has employed a logo to represent itself publicly. The logo was chosen after a competition took place among several agencies and representatives. The logo contains five multi-colored lines of differing length and the slogan "City of Verl – A Good Reason" (German: Stadt Verl – Ein guter Grund).

== Economy ==
Until the end of the 19th century, Verl consisted of only small craft businesses, mainly engaged in wood and meat processing with some brickworks. Today, the town is host to a number of strategically important companies and their headquarters/branches including Beckhoff New Automation Technology, Bertelsmann Financial Services, Teckentrup, Heroal, and Nobilia.

Verl is one of the strongest municipalities in the state of North-Rhine Westphalia financially, due to consistently high trade tax revenues. In 2018, these revenues totaled €54.5 million, and the town's budget's equity amounted to €237.8 million. The town also has the second-lowest trade tax assessment of all state municipalities.

== Notable people ==
- Joachim Milberg
- Elmar Brok
