= Butterbach =

River in Germany

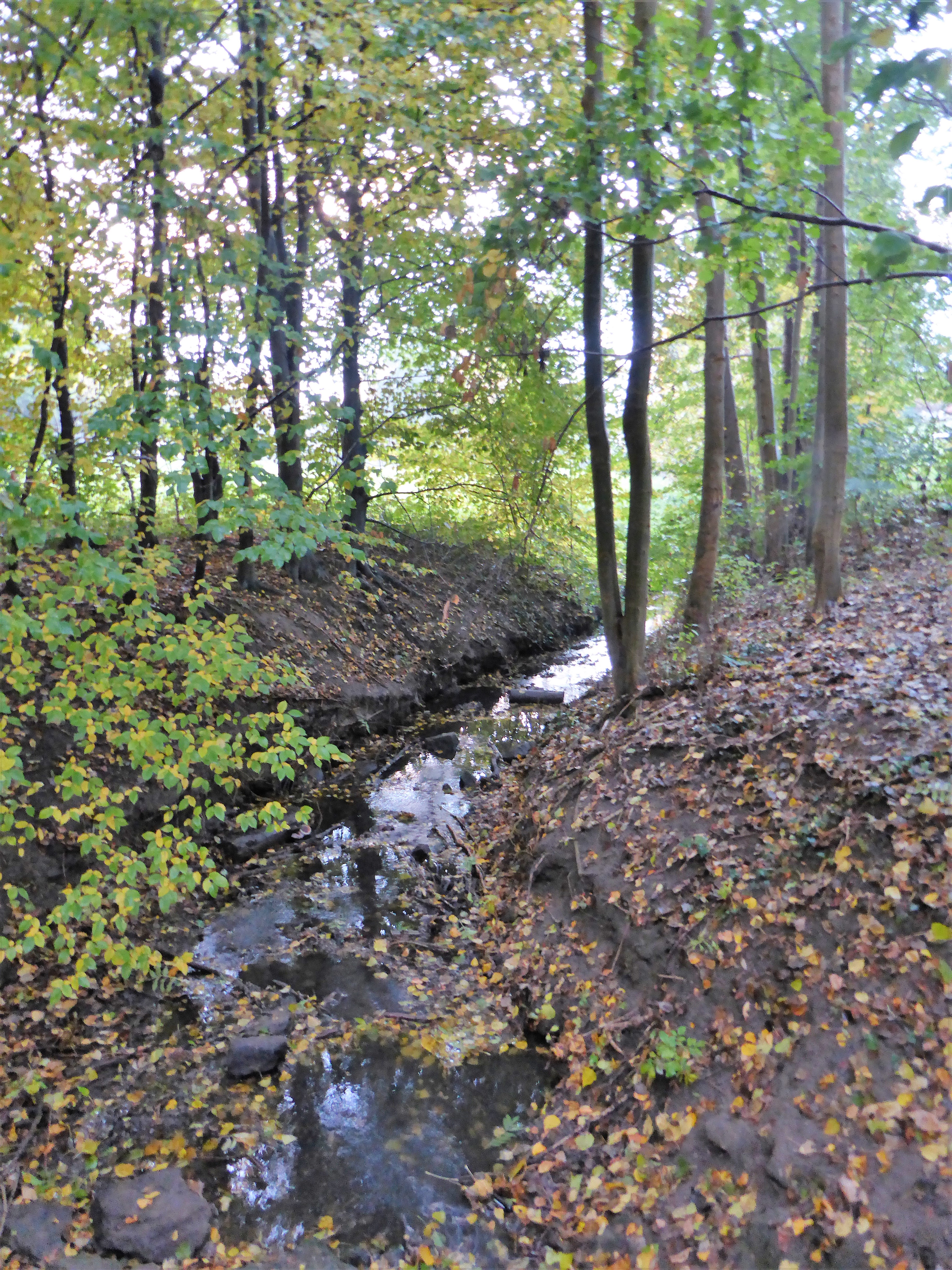

Location
- Country: Germany
- State: North Rhine-Westphalia

Physical characteristics
- Mouth
  - location: Werre
  - coordinates: 52.1258°N 8.6739°E

Basin features
- Progression: Werre→ Weser→ North Sea

Butterbach, also known as Putchemühlenbach, is a small river of North Rhine-Westphalia, Germany. It is 4.4 km long and flows into the Werre in Herford.

== See also ==
- List of rivers of North Rhine-Westphalia
