= Löhner Schulbach =

River in Germany

Location
- Country: Germany
- States: North Rhine-Westphalia

Physical characteristics
- Mouth
  - location: Werre
  - coordinates: 52.1931°N 8.6931°E

Basin features
- Progression: Werre→ Weser→ North Sea

Löhner Schulbach is a small river of North Rhine-Westphalia, Germany. It is 3.8 km long and flows into the Werre as a right tributary in Löhne.

== See also ==
- List of rivers of North Rhine-Westphalia
