= Berghauser Bach =

River in Germany

Location
- Country: Germany
- State: North Rhine-Westphalia

Physical characteristics
- Mouth
  - location: Casumer Bach
  - coordinates: 52.0892°N 8.2652°E

Basin features
- Progression: Casumer Bach→ Hessel→ Ems→ North Sea

Berghauser Bach is a small river of North Rhine-Westphalia, Germany. It flows into the Casumer Bach near Borgholzhausen.

== See also ==
- List of rivers of North Rhine-Westphalia
