= Siekbach (Werre) =

River of North Rhine-Westphalia, Germany

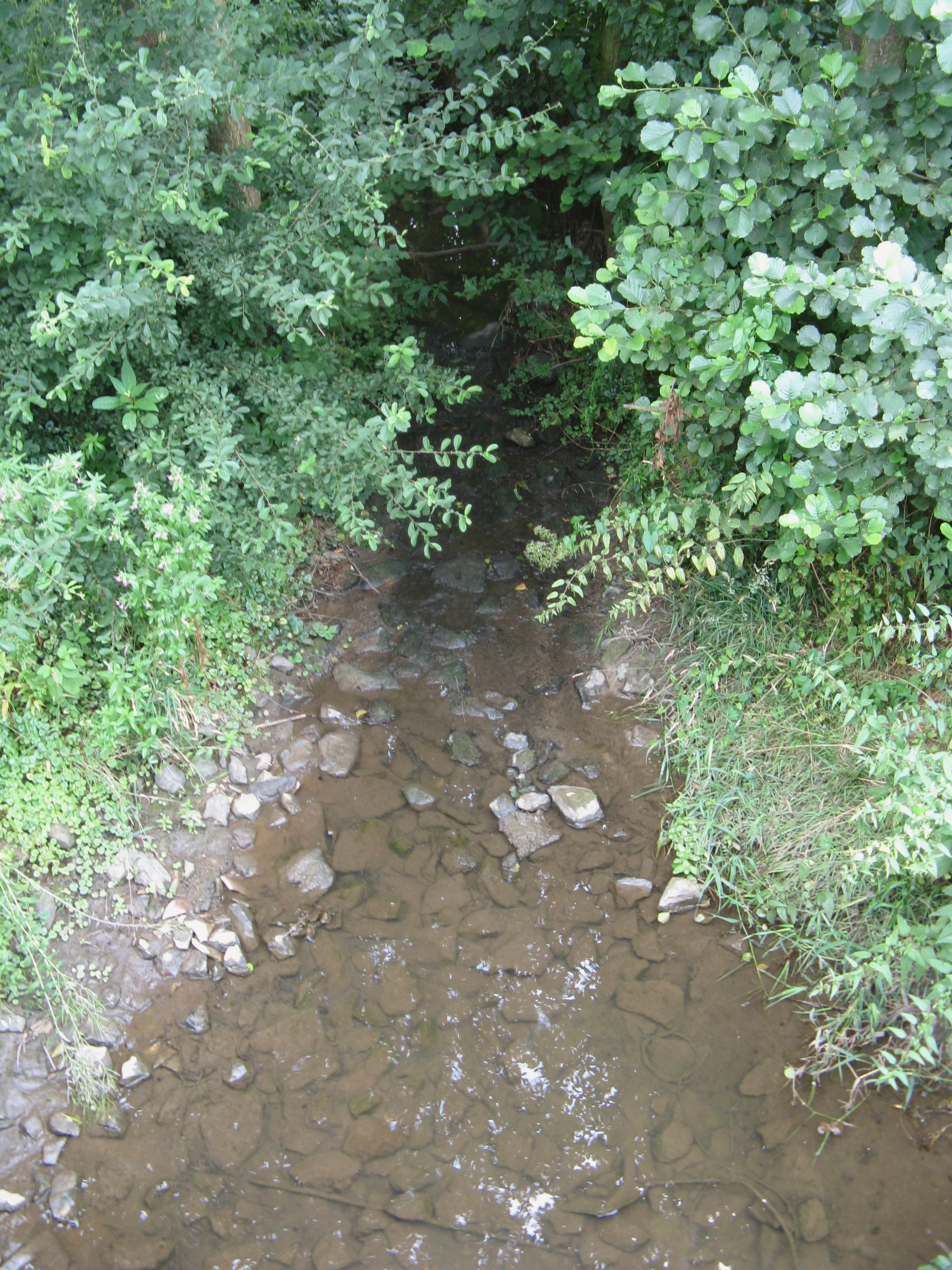

Location
- Country: Germany
- State: North Rhine-Westphalia

Physical characteristics
- Mouth
  - location: Werre
  - coordinates: 52°02′24″N 8°43′57″E

Basin features
- Progression: Werre→ Weser→ North Sea

Siekbach is a small river of North Rhine-Westphalia, Germany. It is 4.6 km (2.9 mi) long and is a left tributary of the Werre near Bad Salzuflen.

== See also ==
- List of rivers of North Rhine-Westphalia
