= Wörbke =

River in Germany

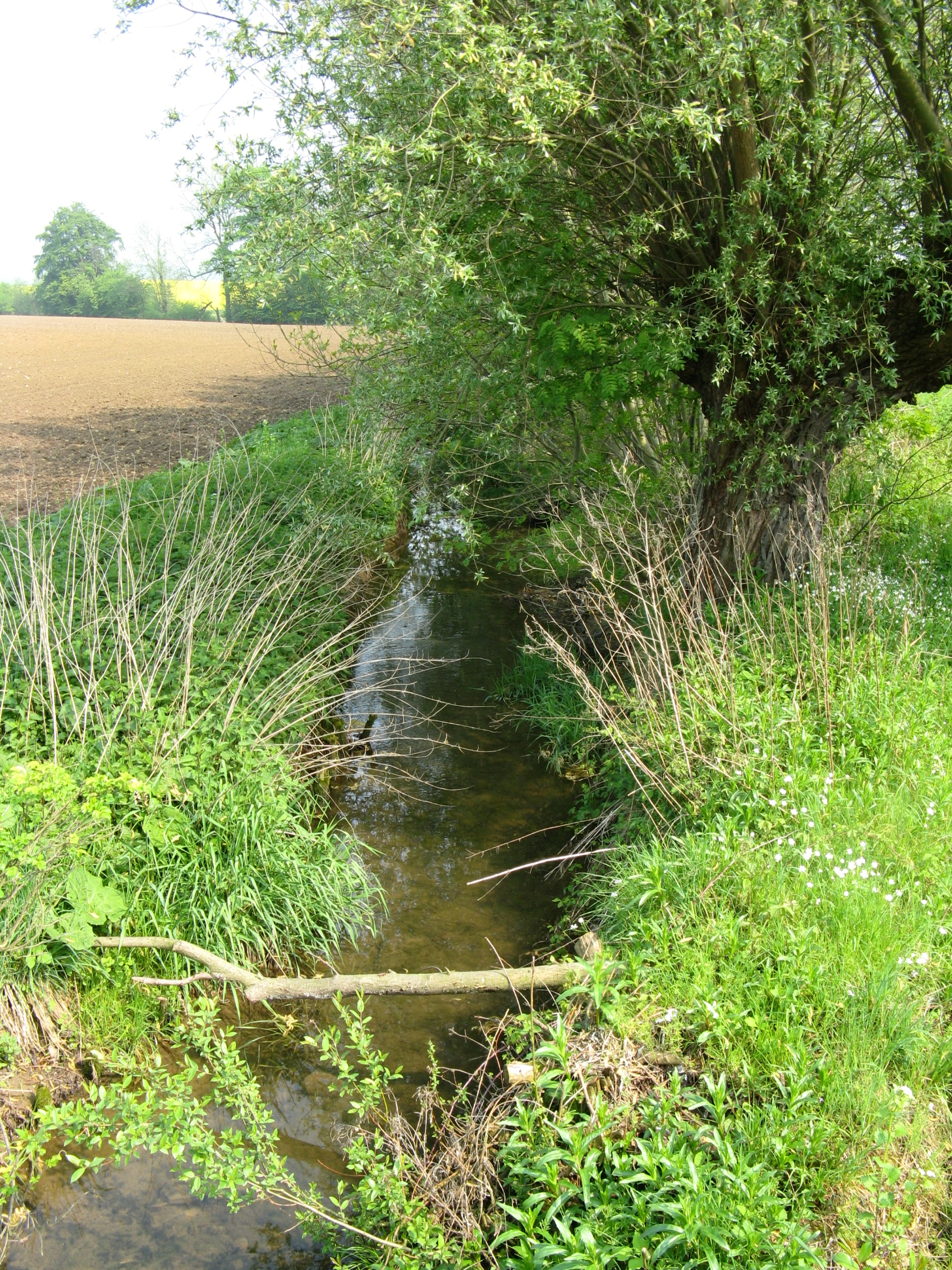

Location
- Country: Germany
- State: North Rhine-Westphalia

Physical characteristics
- Source
  - elevation: 260 m (850 ft)
- Mouth
  - location: Werre
  - coordinates: 51°54′54″N 8°55′05″E
  - elevation: 148 m (486 ft)
- Length: 4.0 km (2.5 mi)

Basin features
- Progression: Werre→ Weser→ North Sea

Wörbke is a river of North Rhine-Westphalia, Germany. The Wörbke is approximately 4 km long, a right tributary of the Werre in the Lippe district in Ostwestfalen-Lippe. The source of the river has an elevation of 260 metres and the mouth an elevation of 148 metres.

== See also ==
- List of rivers of North Rhine-Westphalia
