= Napte =

River in Germany

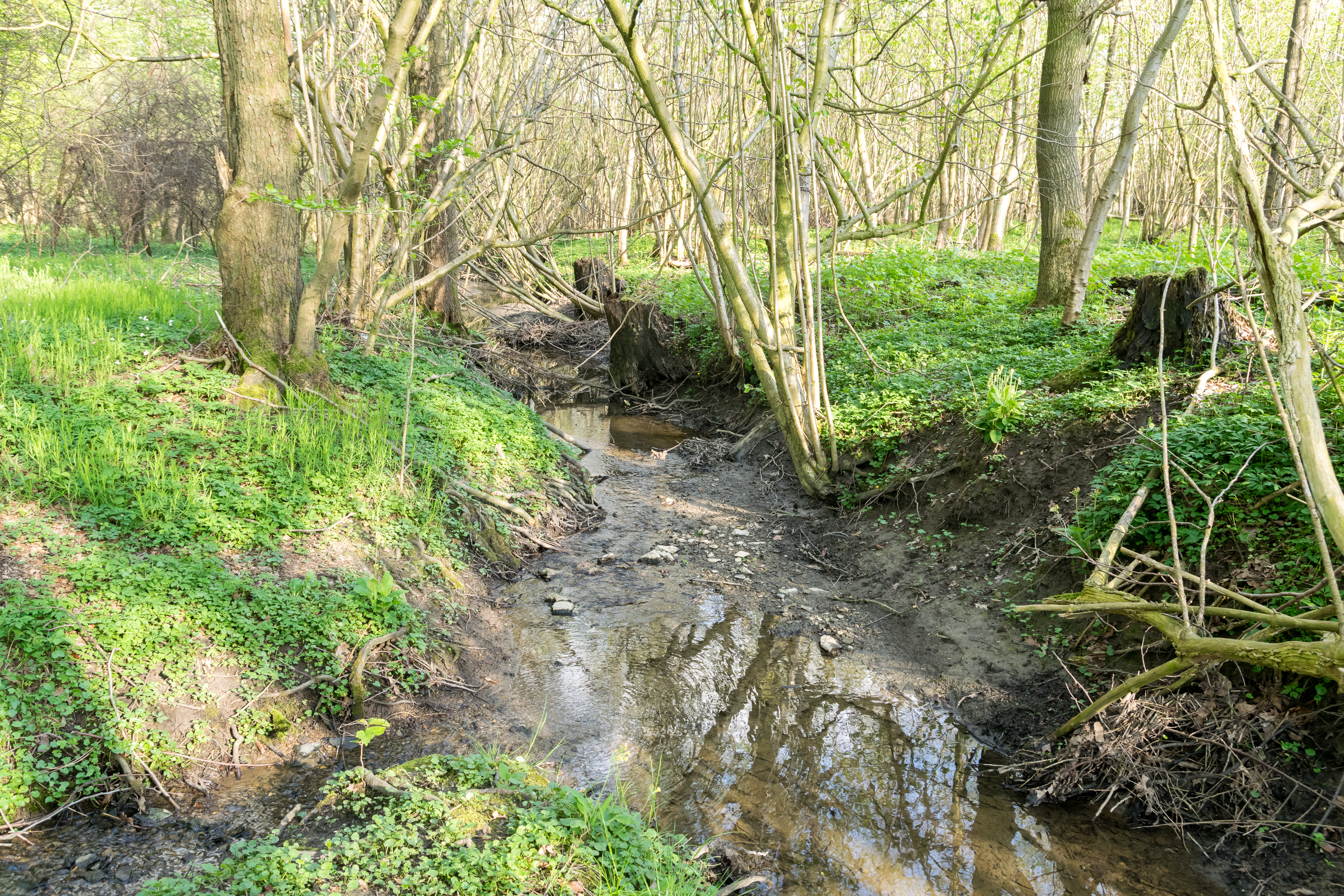

Location
- Country: Germany
- State: North Rhine-Westphalia

Physical characteristics
- Mouth
  - location: Emmer
  - coordinates: 51.8917°N 9.0971°E
- Length: 10.7 km (6.6 mi)

Basin features
- Progression: Emmer→ Weser→ North Sea

Napte is a river of North Rhine-Westphalia, Germany. It flows into the Emmer near Steinheim.

== See also ==
- List of rivers of North Rhine-Westphalia
