= Pustmühlenbach =

River in Germany

Location
- Country: Germany
- States: North Rhine-Westphalia

Physical characteristics
- Mouth
  - location: Casumer Bach
  - coordinates: 52.0723°N 8.2632°E

Basin features
- Progression: Casumer Bach→ Hessel→ Ems→ North Sea

Pustmühlenbach is a small river of North Rhine-Westphalia, Germany. It is 3.7 km (2.3 mi) long and flows into the Casumer Bach as a left tributary near Borgholzhausen.

== See also ==
- List of rivers of North Rhine-Westphalia
