= Bowerre =

Former river in Germany

Coordinates: 52°07′04″N 8°40′04″E

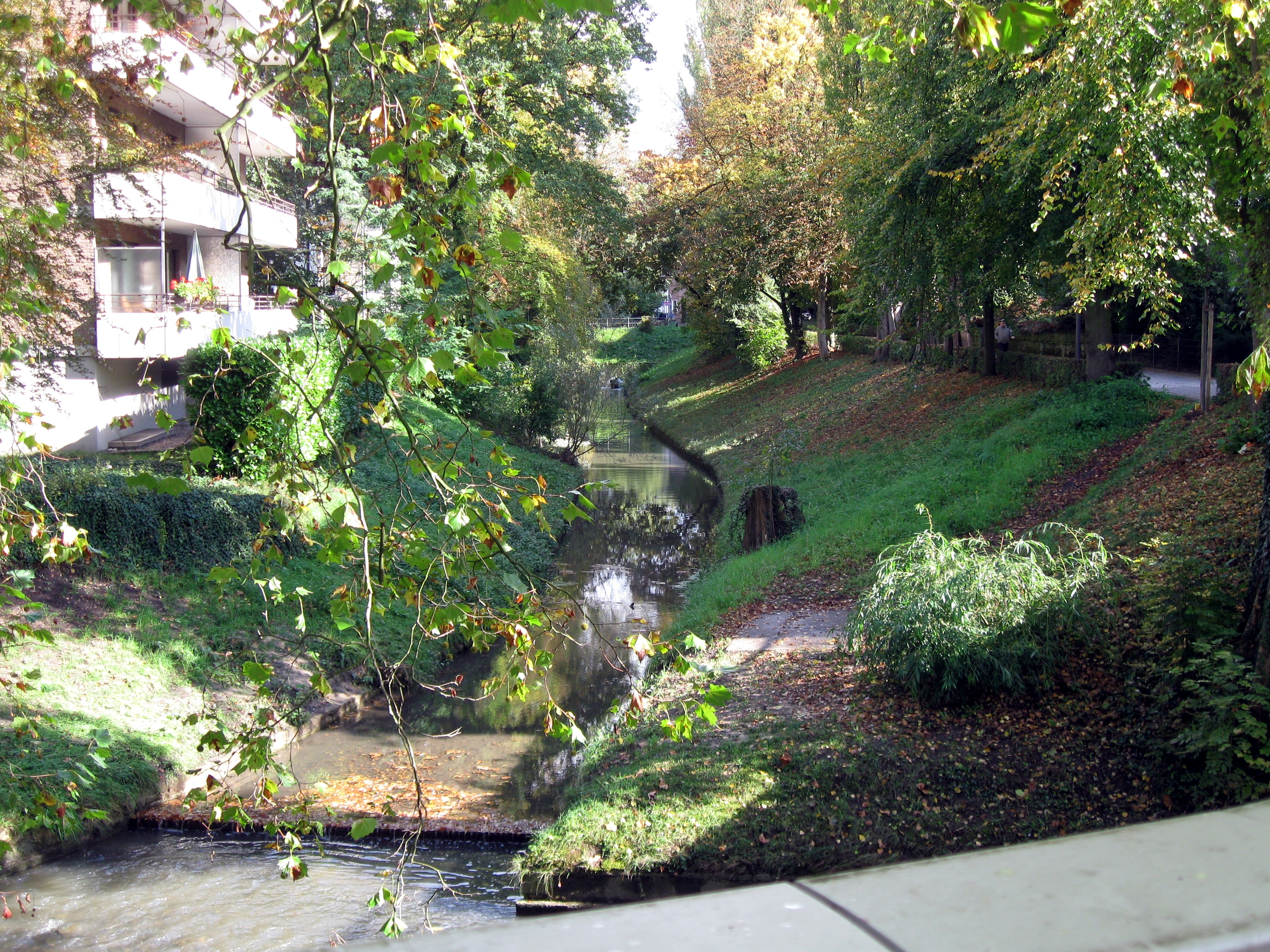

Location
- Country: Germany
- State: North Rhine-Westphalia

The Bowerre is a former branch of the river Werre in the centre of the town of Herford, North Rhine-Westphalia, Germany. The Bowerre formed the border between the Altstadt ("old town") and Neustadt ("new town") until the 1960s.

It was the site of a linen mill from the 13th century until 1972, when the old course of the Werre was filled in, partly due to poor water quality. Filling in the Bowerre was controversial at the time, and later caused the groundwater level to sink in the town, which still causes ground instability today.

== See also ==
- List of rivers of North Rhine-Westphalia
