= Sudbach =

River in Germany

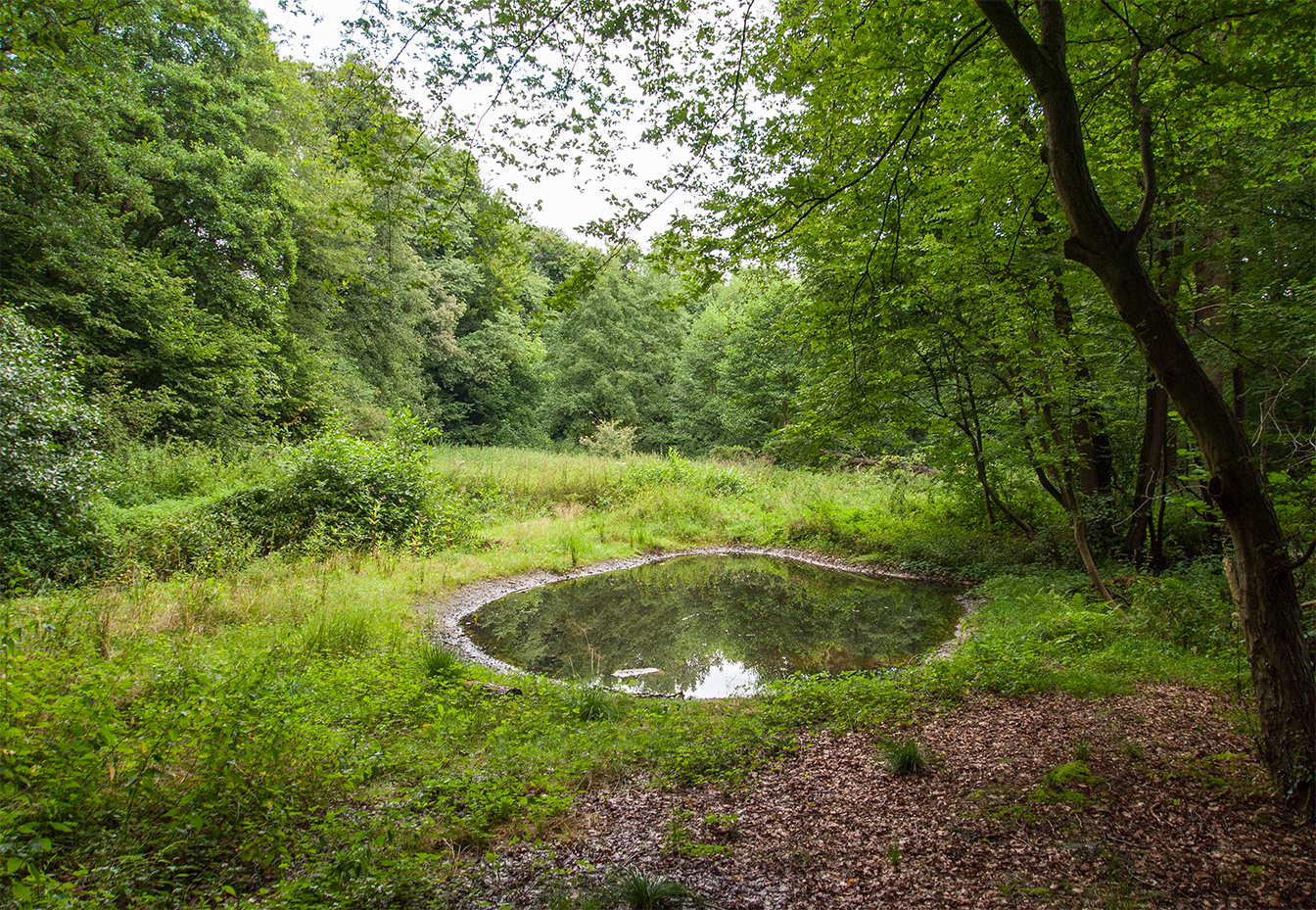

Location
- Country: Germany
- State: North Rhine-Westphalia

Physical characteristics
- Mouth
  - location: Werre
  - coordinates: 52.2072°N 8.7614°E

Basin features
- Progression: Werre→ Weser→ North Sea

Sudbach is a small river of North Rhine-Westphalia, Germany. It is 3.6 km (2.2 mi) long and flows as a right tributary into the Werre near Löhne.

== See also ==
- List of rivers of North Rhine-Westphalia
