= Bexter =

River in Germany

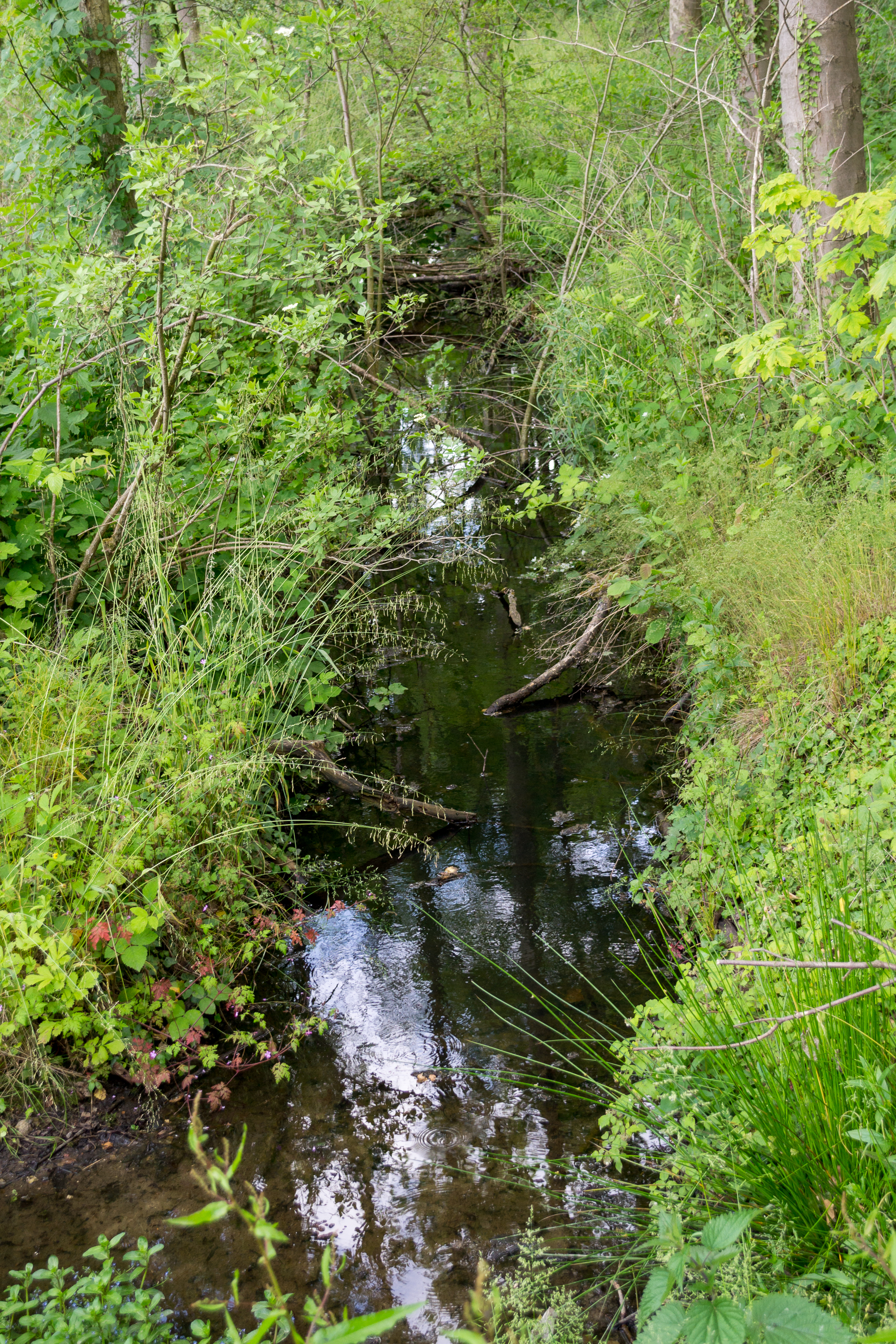

Location
- Country: Germany
- State: North Rhine-Westphalia

Physical characteristics
- Mouth
  - location: Werre
  - coordinates: 52°03′09″N 8°44′33″E

Basin features
- Progression: Werre→ Weser→ North Sea

Bexter is a small river of North Rhine-Westphalia, Germany. It is 5.2 km long and flows into the Werre near Bad Salzuflen.

== See also ==
- List of rivers of North Rhine-Westphalia
