= Spenger Mühlenbach =

River in Germany

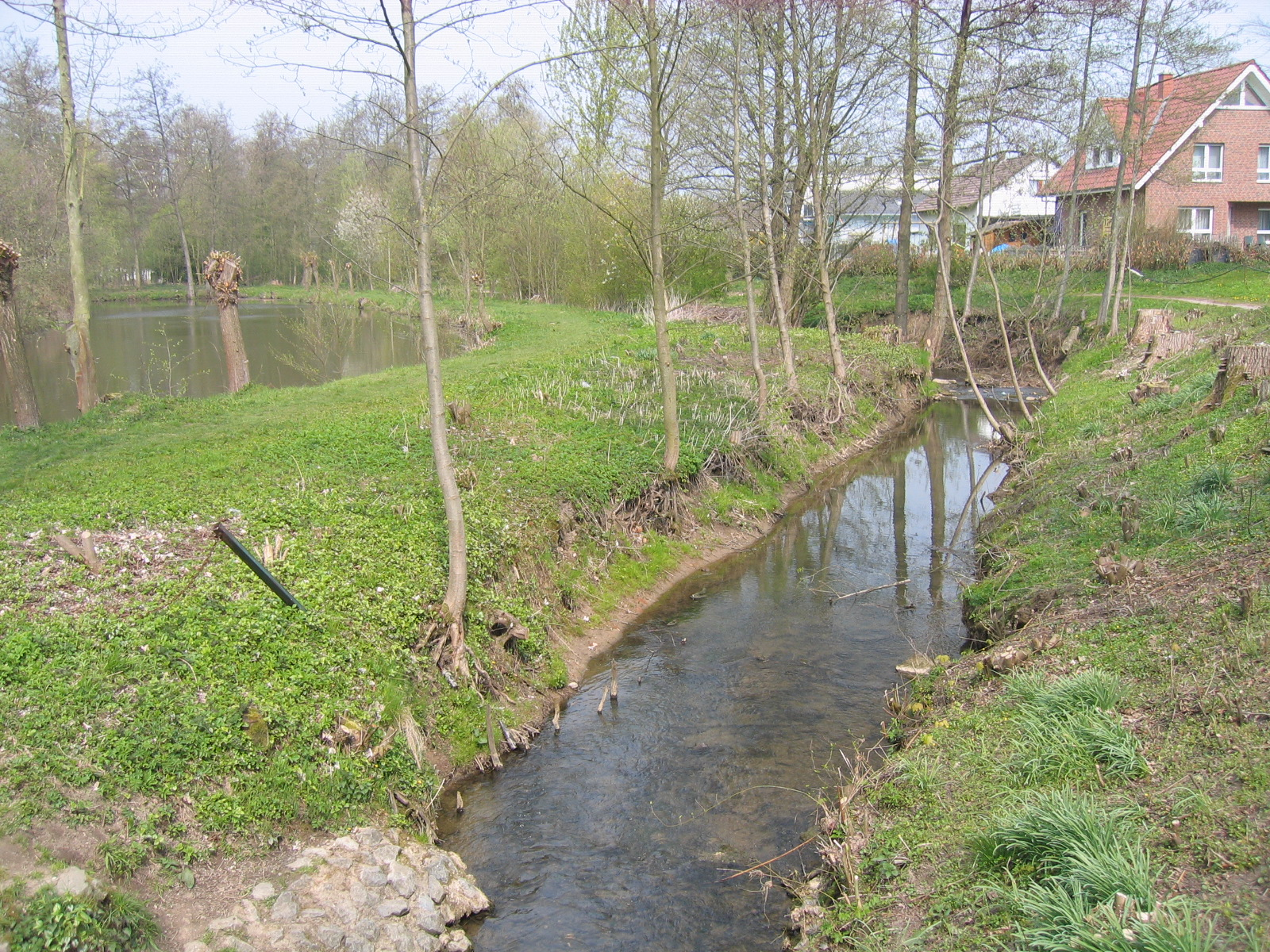

Location
- Country: Germany
- State: North Rhine-Westphalia

Physical characteristics
- Mouth
  - location: Warmenau
  - coordinates: 52.1597°N 8.4786°E

Basin features
- Progression: Warmenau→ Else→ Werre→ Weser→ North Sea

Spenger Mühlenbach is a river of North Rhine-Westphalia, Germany. It is 7 km (4.3 mi) long and flows as a right tributary into the Warmenau near Spenge.

== See also ==
- List of rivers of North Rhine-Westphalia
