= Großer Bastergraben =

River in Germany

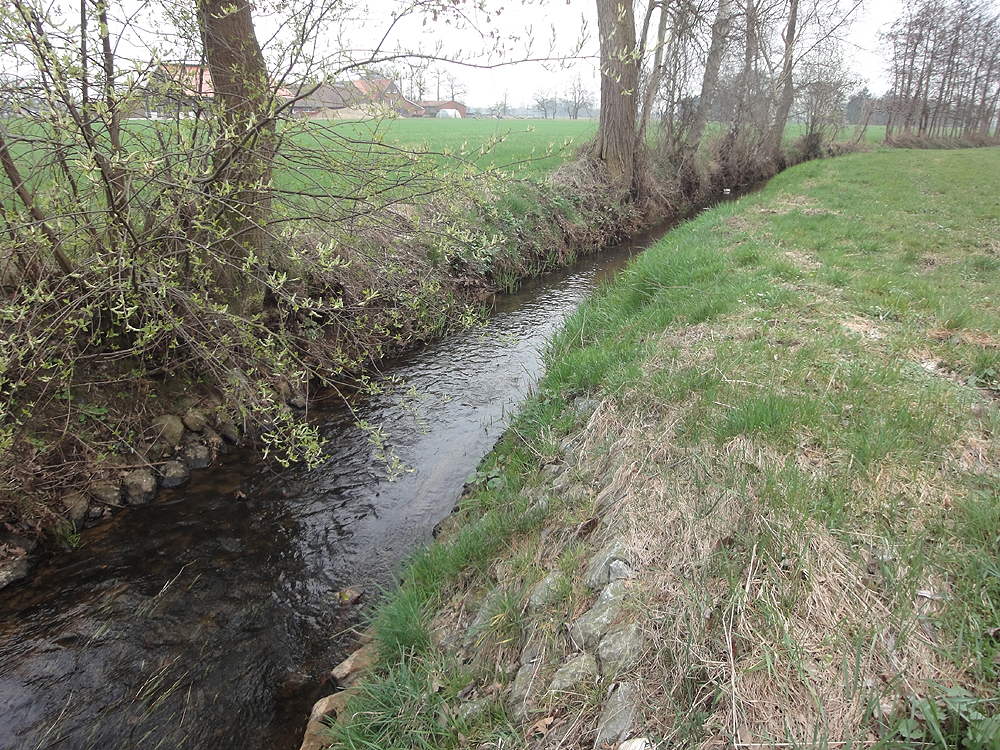

Location
- Country: Germany
- State: North Rhine-Westphalia

Physical characteristics
- Mouth
  - location: Wapelbach
  - coordinates: 51.8486°N 8.3898°E
- Length: 10.6 km (6.6 mi)

Basin features
- Progression: Wapelbach→ Dalke→ Ems→ North Sea

Großer Bastergraben is a river of North Rhine-Westphalia, Germany. It flows into the Wapelbach south of Gütersloh.

== See also ==
- List of rivers of North Rhine-Westphalia
