= Lichtebach =

River in Germany

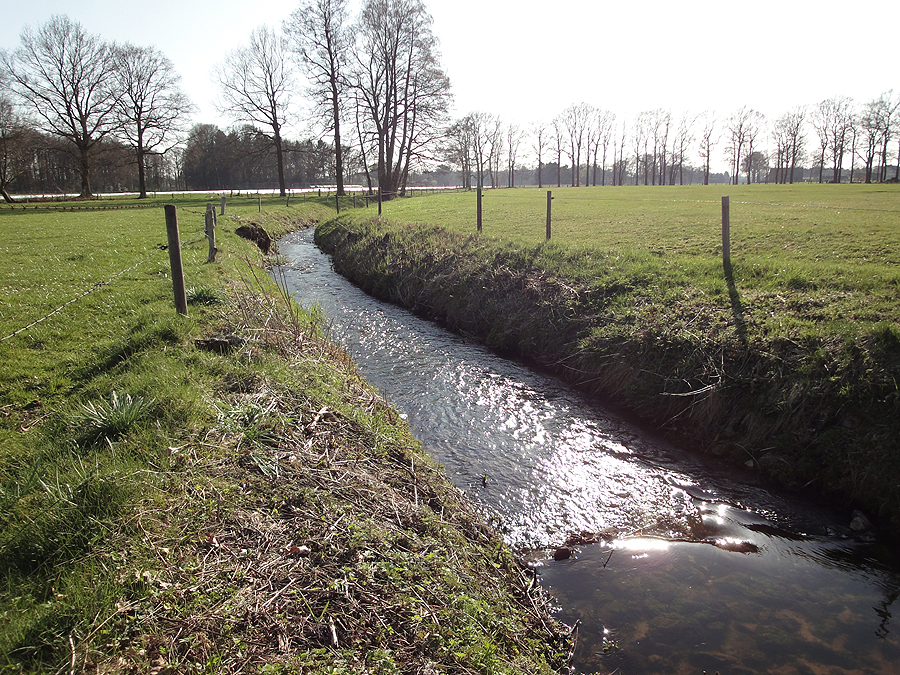

Location
- Country: Germany
- State: North Rhine-Westphalia

Physical characteristics
- Mouth
  - location: Lutter
  - coordinates: 51.9487°N 8.2605°E
- Length: 18.8 km (11.7 mi)

Basin features
- Progression: Lutter→ Ems→ North Sea

Lichtebach (in its lower course also: Wöstenbach) is a river of North Rhine-Westphalia, Germany, which flows into the Lutter near Harsewinkel.

== See also ==
- List of rivers of North Rhine-Westphalia
