= Steinbach (Laerbach) =

River in Lower Saxony, Germany

Location
- Country: Germany
- States: Lower Saxony; North Rhine-Westphalia

Physical characteristics
- Mouth
  - location: Laerbach
  - coordinates: 52.1412°N 8.3029°E

Basin features
- Progression: Laerbach→ Else→ Werre→ Weser→ North Sea

The Steinbach is a small river of Lower Saxony and of North Rhine-Westphalia, Germany. It is 2.7 km (1.7 mi) long and is a right tributary of the Laerbach, which itself is a tributary of the Else. It is one of 30 rivers and streams in North Rhine-Westphalia officially recorded under the name Steinbach.

== See also ==
- List of rivers of Lower Saxony
- List of rivers of North Rhine-Westphalia
