= Niese (Emmer) =

River in Germany

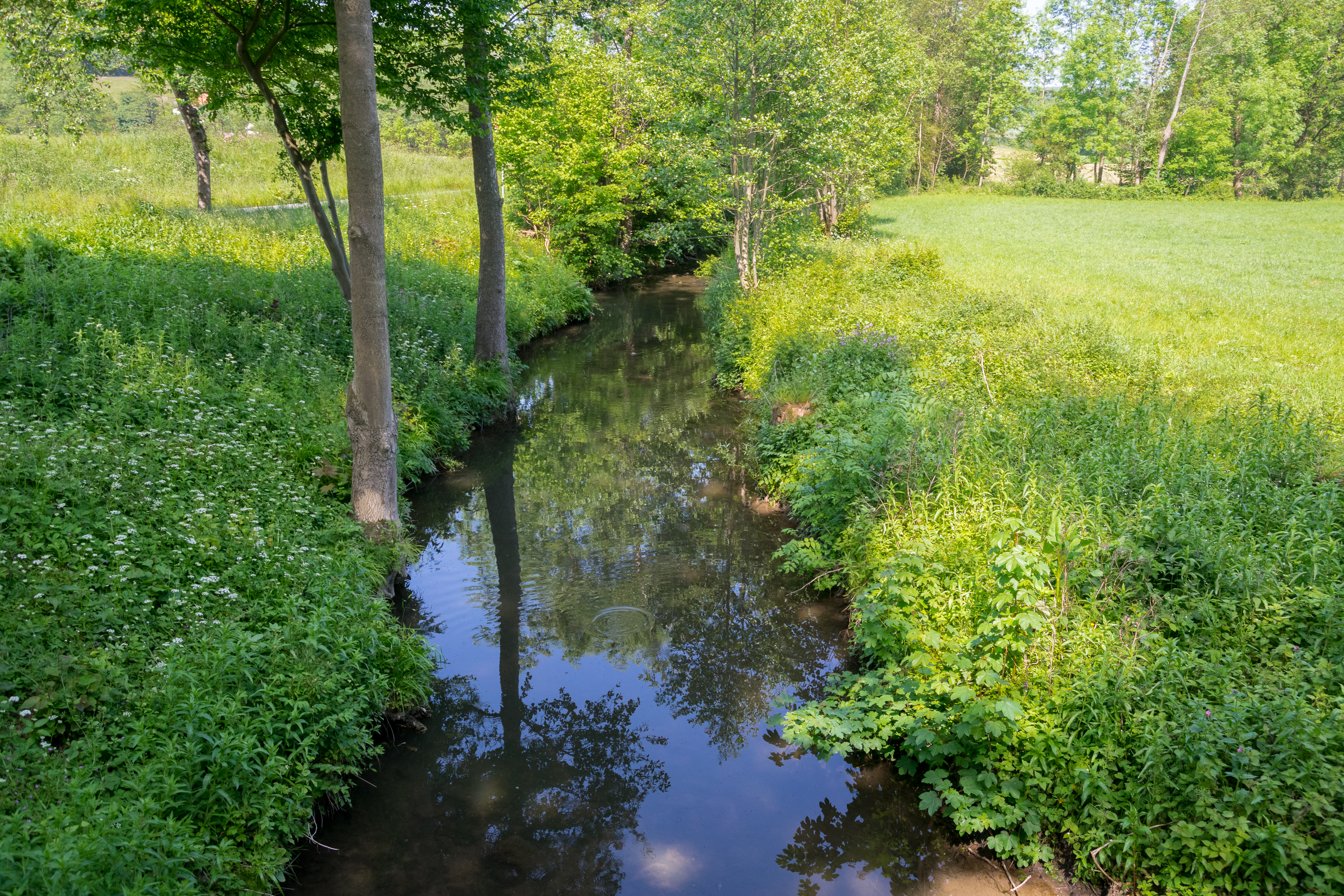

Location
- Country: Germany
- State: North Rhine-Westphalia

Physical characteristics
- Mouth
  - location: Emmer
  - coordinates: 51.9174°N 9.1400°E
- Length: 25.7 km (16.0 mi)

Basin features
- Progression: Emmer→ Weser→ North Sea

Niese is a river of North Rhine-Westphalia, Germany. It is a right tributary of the Emmer in Schieder-Schwalenberg.

== See also ==
- List of rivers of North Rhine-Westphalia
