= Mittelbach =

River in Germany

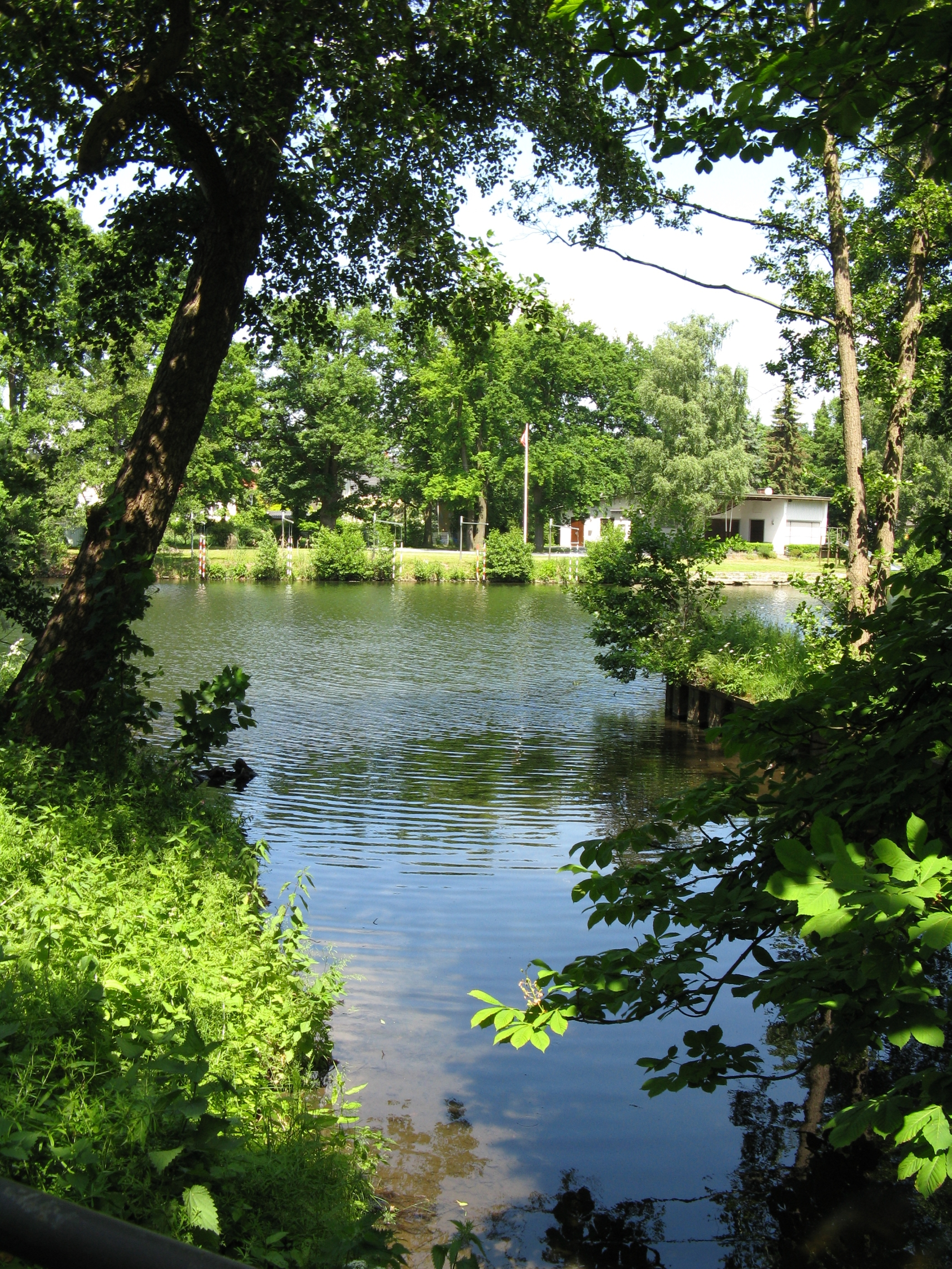

Location
- Country: Germany
- State: North Rhine-Westphalia

Physical characteristics
- Mouth
  - location: Werre
  - coordinates: 52.2089°N 8.7782°E
- Length: 8.2 km (5.1 mi)

Basin features
- Progression: Werre→ Weser→ North Sea

Mittelbach is a river of North Rhine-Westphalia, Germany. It flows into the Werre near Bad Oeynhausen.

== See also ==
- List of rivers of North Rhine-Westphalia
