= Diestelbach =

River in Germany

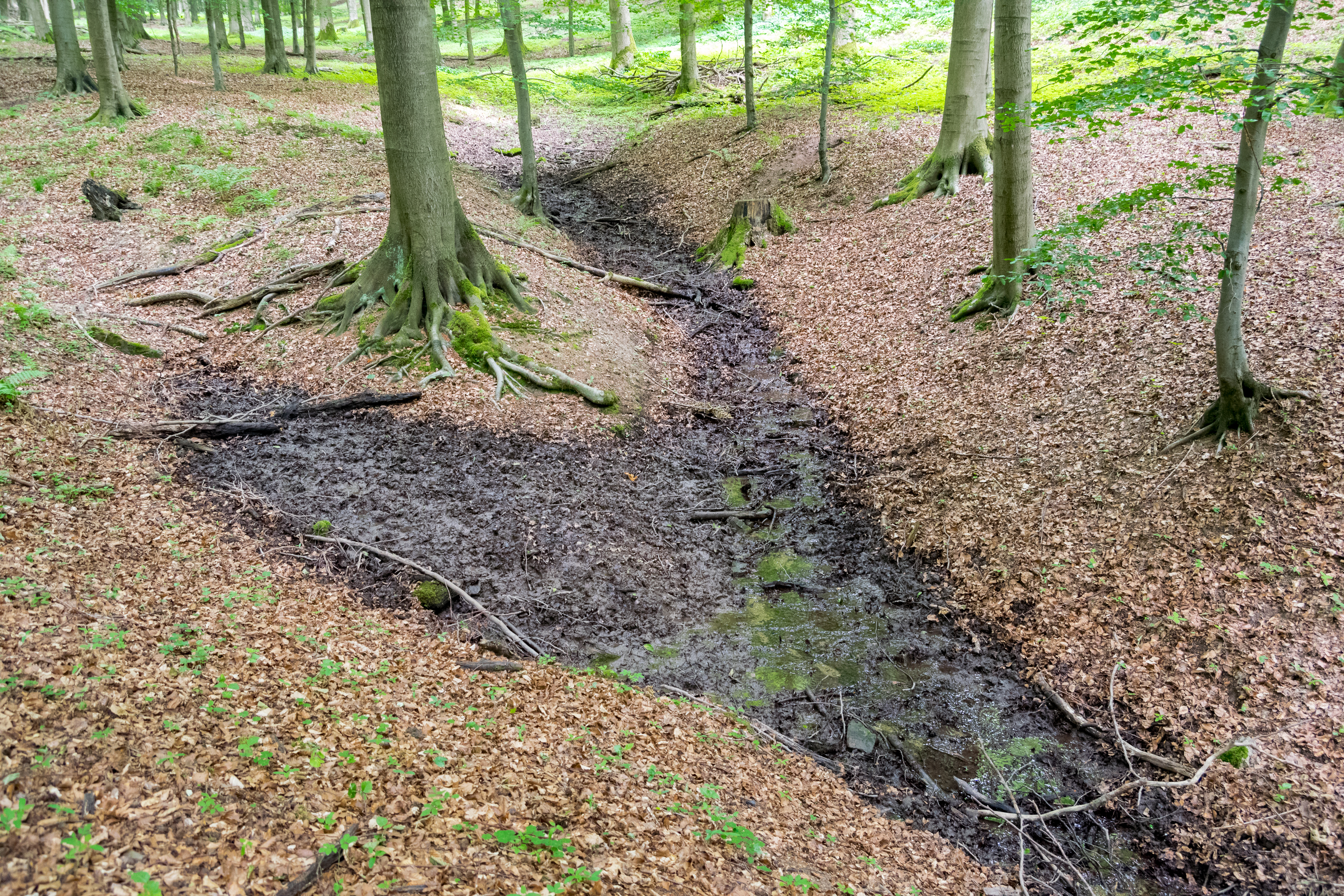

Location
- Country: Germany
- State: North Rhine-Westphalia

Physical characteristics
- Mouth
  - location: Emmer
  - coordinates: 51.9115°N 9.1278°E
  - elevation: 47 m (154 ft) above sea level
- Length: 11.3 km (7.0 mi)
- Basin size: 64.6 km^{2} (24.9 sq mi)

Basin features
- Progression: Emmer→ Weser→ North Sea
- Tributaries
  - left: Duddenloch
  - right: Königsbach

Diestelbach is a river in the district of Lippe in the eastern part of North Rhine-Westphalia, Germany. Also known as the Diestel, it is a tributary of the Emmer.

== Course ==
The source of the Diestelbach is 250 m above sea level on the 426 m high Winterberg hill in the city forest of Blomberg in North Rhine-Westphalia. Flowing west in the direction of Blomberg, the river then curves southward from Blomberg by Borkhausen where it is fed by the Königsbach. From here the Diestelbach flows southeast until Nessenberg where it joins the Emmer at 35.2 km west of Schieder-Schwalenberg at a height of 123 m above sea level.

== Water quality ==
The Diestelbach is moderately polluted by outflows from the Blomberg wastewater treatment facility and the timber industry in Blomberg. This pollution reaches the Diestelbach via the Königsbach river.

== See also ==
- List of rivers of North Rhine-Westphalia
