= Rothenbach (Werre) =

River in North Rhine-Westphalia, Germany

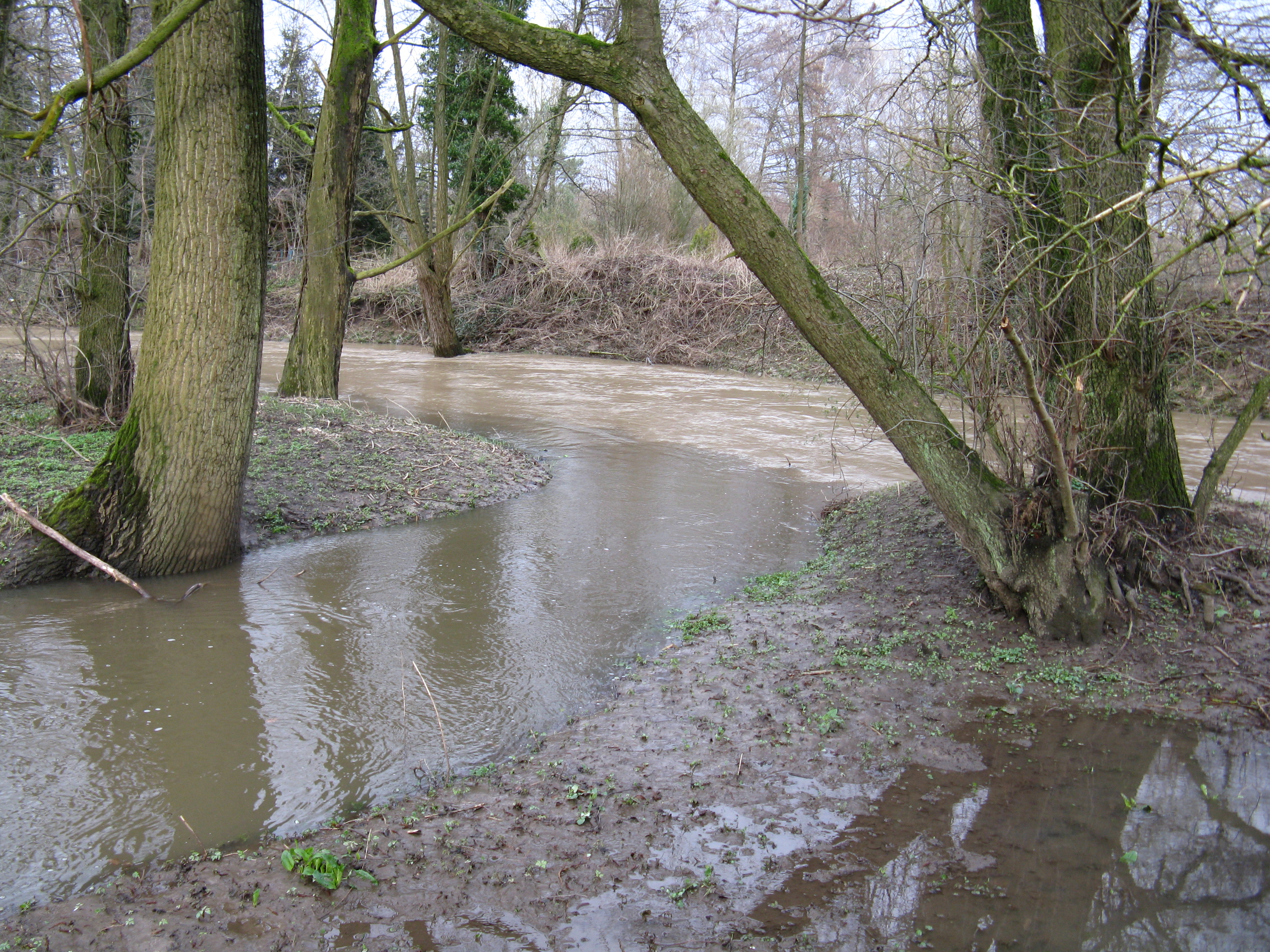

Location
- Country: Germany
- States: North Rhine-Westphalia

Physical characteristics
- Mouth
  - location: Werre
  - coordinates: 51°58′20″N 8°48′12″E

Basin features
- Progression: Werre→ Weser→ North Sea

Rothenbach (German pronunciation: [ˈʁoːtn̩ˌbax]) is a river of North Rhine-Westphalia, Germany. It is 3.9 km (2.4 mi) long and is a left tributary of the Werre near Lage.

== See also ==
- List of rivers of North Rhine-Westphalia
