= Welplagebach =

River in Germany

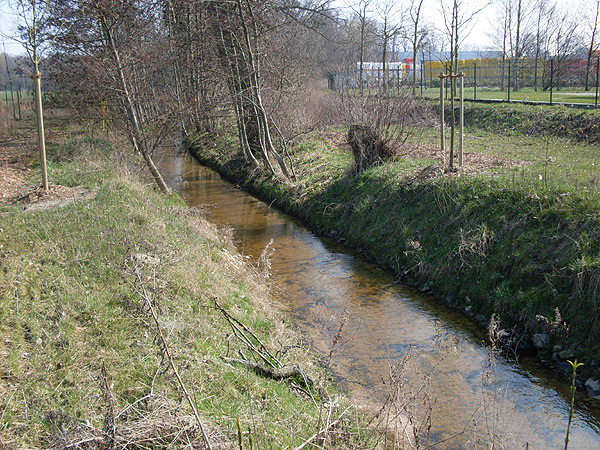

Location
- Country: Germany
- State: North Rhine-Westphalia

Physical characteristics
- Mouth
  - location: Lutter
  - coordinates: 51.9449°N 8.2786°E
- Length: 17.0 km (10.6 mi)

Basin features
- Progression: Lutter→ Ems→ North Sea

Welplagebach is a river of North Rhine-Westphalia, Germany. It is a left tributary of the Lutter in Harsewinkel-Marienfeld.

== See also ==
- List of rivers of North Rhine-Westphalia
