= Krullsbach =

River in Germany

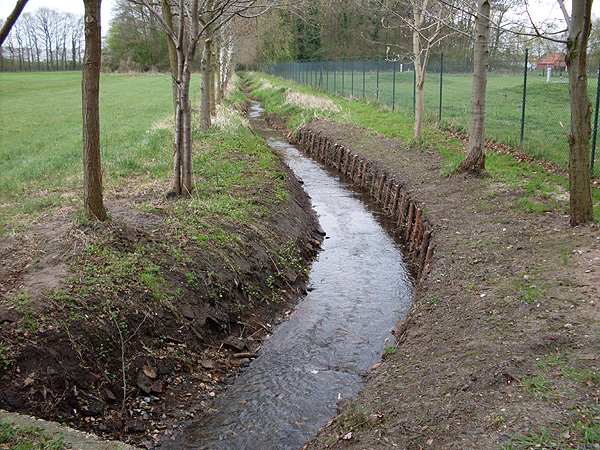

Location
- Country: Germany
- States: North Rhine-Westphalia

Physical characteristics
- Source
  - coordinates: 51°57′43″N 8°25′32″E
- Mouth
  - location: Lutter
  - coordinates: 51.9433°N 8.3280°E

Basin features
- Progression: Lutter→ Ems→ North Sea

Krullsbach is a river of North Rhine-Westphalia, Germany. It is 8.6 km long and flows into the Lutter as a right tributary northwest of Gütersloh.

== See also ==
- List of rivers of North Rhine-Westphalia
