= Passade (river) =

River in Germany

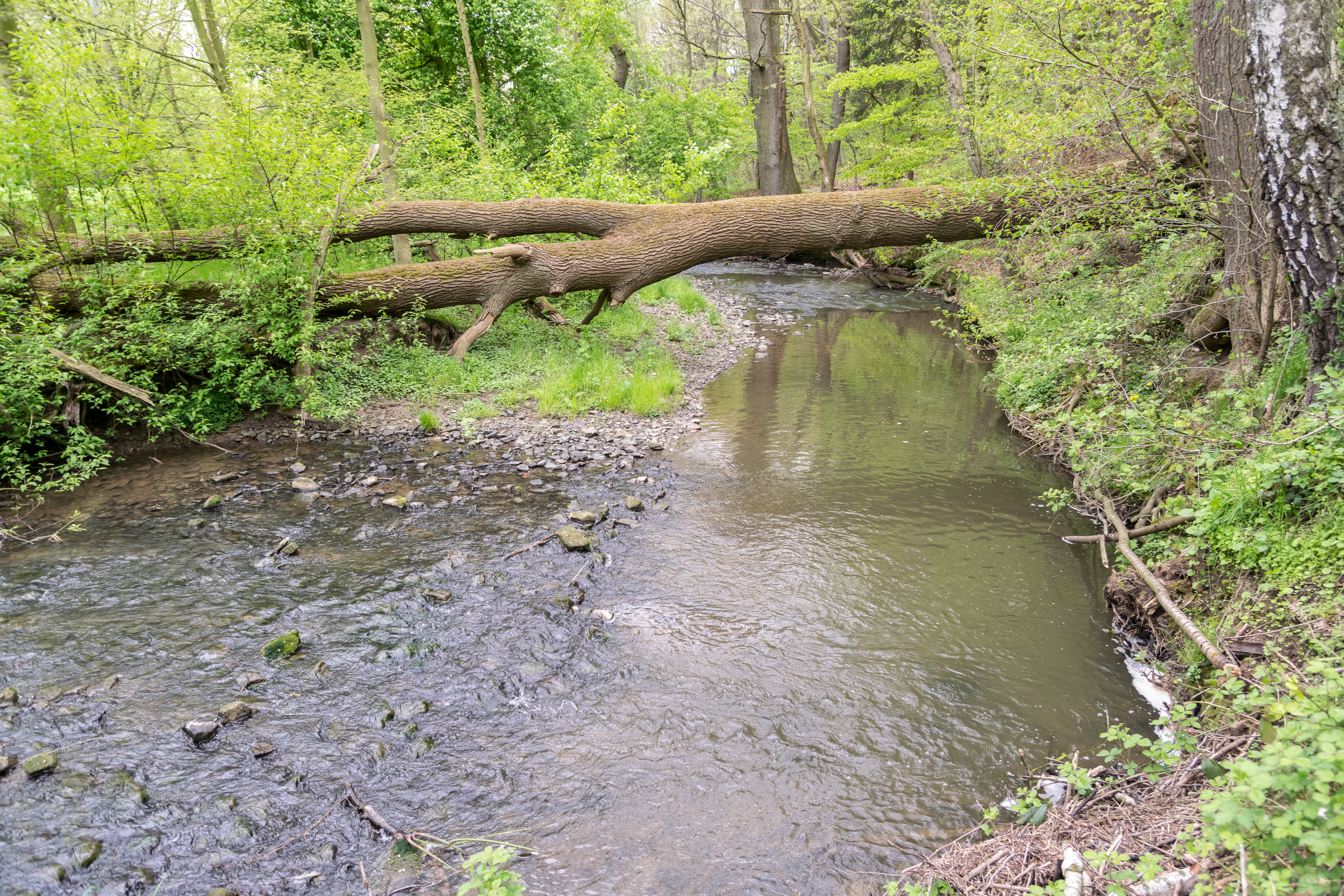

Location
- Country: Germany
- State: North Rhine-Westphalia

Physical characteristics
- Mouth
  - location: Bega
  - coordinates: 52.0156°N 8.9544°E
- Length: 15.1 km (9.4 mi)

Basin features
- Progression: Bega→ Werre→ Weser→ North Sea

Passade is a river of North Rhine-Westphalia, Germany. It flows into the Bega east of Lemgo.

== See also ==
- List of rivers of North Rhine-Westphalia
