= Knisterbach =

River in Germany

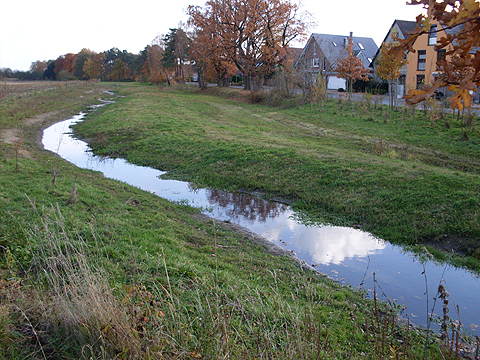

Location
- Country: Germany
- State: North Rhine-Westphalia

Physical characteristics
- Mouth
  - location: Wapelbach
  - coordinates: 51.8844°N 8.3396°E
- Length: 13.5 km (8.4 mi)

Basin features
- Progression: Wapelbach→ Dalke→ Ems→ North Sea

Knisterbach is a river of North Rhine-Westphalia, Germany. It flows into the Wapelbach near Gütersloh.

== See also ==
- List of rivers of North Rhine-Westphalia
