= Heipker Bach =

River in Germany

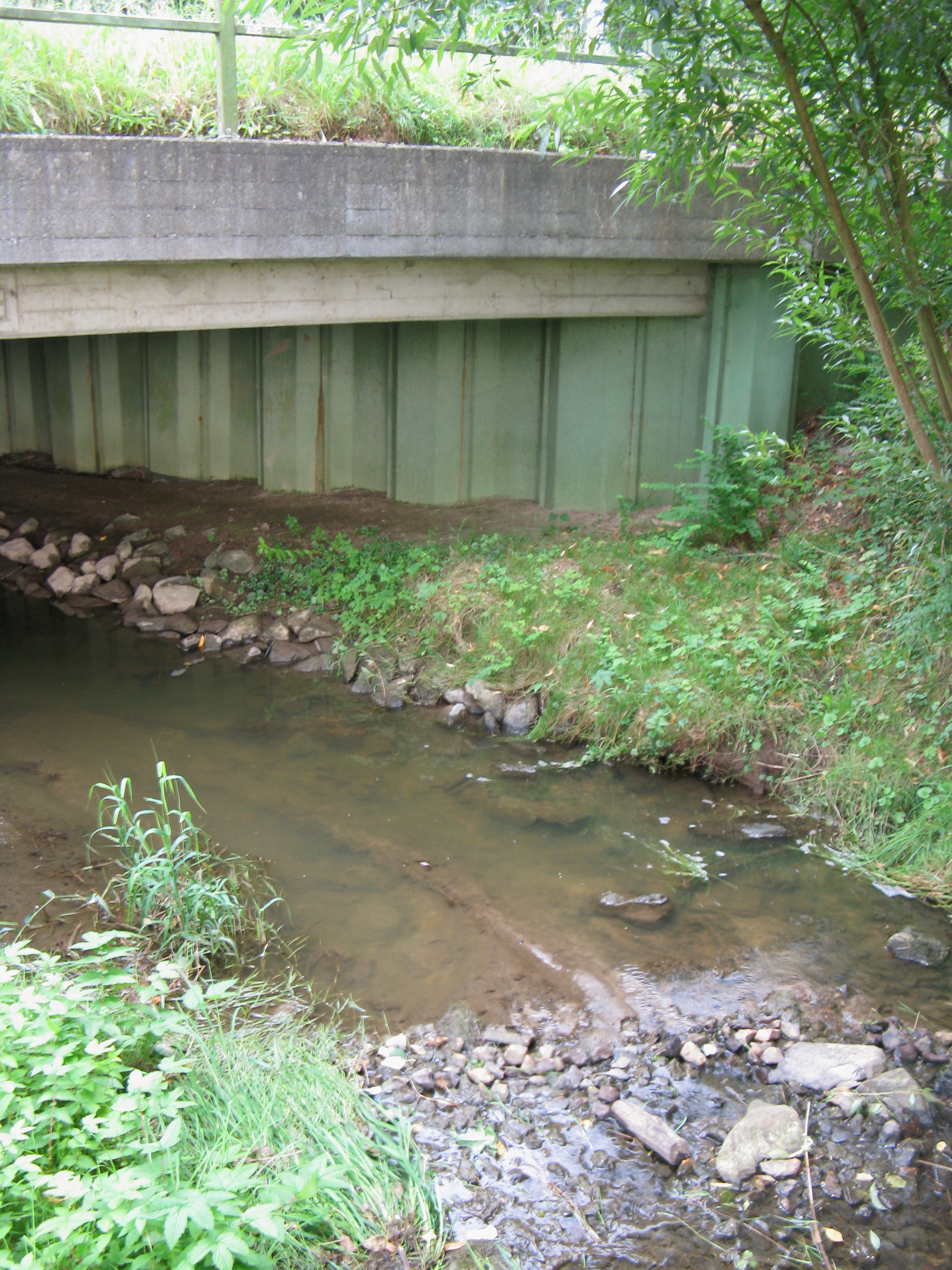

Location
- Country: Germany
- States: North Rhine-Westphalia

Physical characteristics
- Mouth
  - location: Werre
  - coordinates: 52.0336°N 8.7317°E

Basin features
- Progression: Werre→ Weser→ North Sea

Heipker Bach is a small river of North Rhine-Westphalia, Germany. It is 4.6 km long and flows into the Werre near Bad Salzuflen.

== See also ==
- List of rivers of North Rhine-Westphalia
