= Jöllenbecker Mühlenbach =

River in Germany

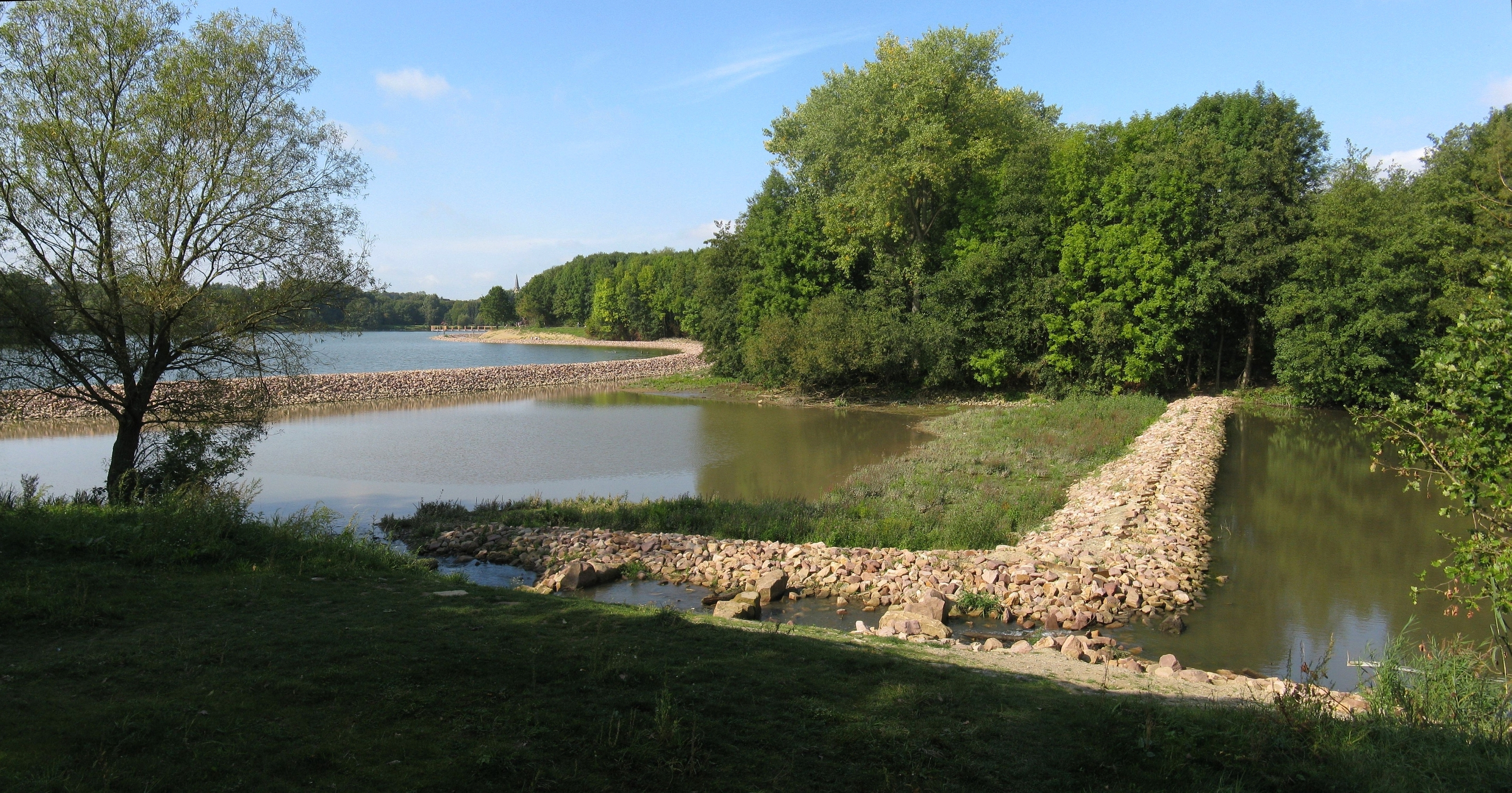

Location
- Country: Germany
- States: North Rhine-Westphalia

Physical characteristics
- Mouth
  - location: Jölle
  - coordinates: 52.0975°N 8.5602°E

Basin features
- Progression: Jölle→ Aa→ Werre→ Weser→ North Sea

Jöllenbecker Mühlenbach is a small river of North Rhine-Westphalia, Germany. It is 5.6 km long and flows into the Jölle near Bielefeld-Jöllenbeck. The stream supplied water to mills in Jöllenbeck.

== See also ==
- List of rivers of North Rhine-Westphalia
