= Bramschebach =

River in Germany

Location
- Country: Germany
- State: North Rhine-Westphalia

Physical characteristics
- Mouth
  - location: Werre
  - coordinates: 52.1664°N 8.6717°E

Basin features
- Progression: Werre→ Weser→ North Sea

Bramschebach is a small river of North Rhine-Westphalia, Germany. It is 5.9 km long and flows into the Werre east of Hiddenhausen.

== See also ==
- List of rivers of North Rhine-Westphalia
