= Rothenbach (Ems) =

River in Germany

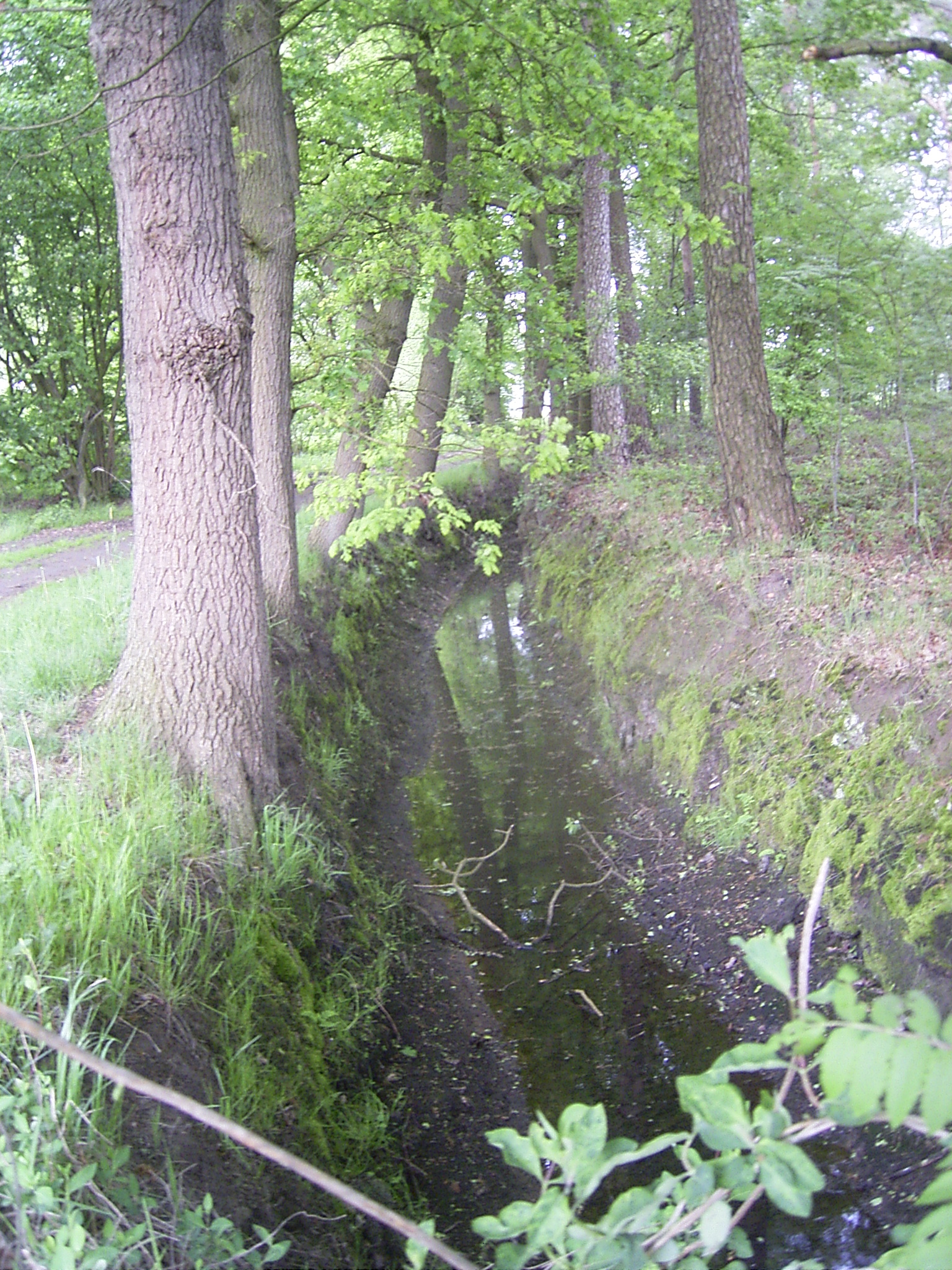

Location
- Country: Germany
- States: North Rhine-Westphalia

Physical characteristics
- Mouth
  - location: Ems
  - coordinates: 51.8250°N 8.3544°E

Basin features
- Progression: Ems→ North Sea

Rothenbach (German pronunciation: [ˈʁoːtn̩ˌbax]) is a river of North Rhine-Westphalia, Germany. It is 7.5 km (4.7 mi) long and is a right tributary of the Ems, which it joins near Rheda-Wiedenbrück.

== See also ==
- List of rivers of North Rhine-Westphalia
