= Poggenbach =

River in Germany

Location
- Country: Germany
- States: North Rhine-Westphalia

Physical characteristics
- Mouth
  - location: Ems
  - coordinates: 51.9462°N 8.2138°E

Basin features
- Progression: Ems→ North Sea

Poggenbach is a river of North Rhine-Westphalia, Germany. It flows into the Ems south of Harsewinkel, about 200 m (0.12 mi) after it crosses the Südlicher Talgraben. (Note: The official list of waterways for the state of North Rhine-Westphalia may mistakenly list its confluence as the Südlicher Talgraben.)

== See also ==
- List of rivers of North Rhine-Westphalia
