= Harlebach =

River in Germany

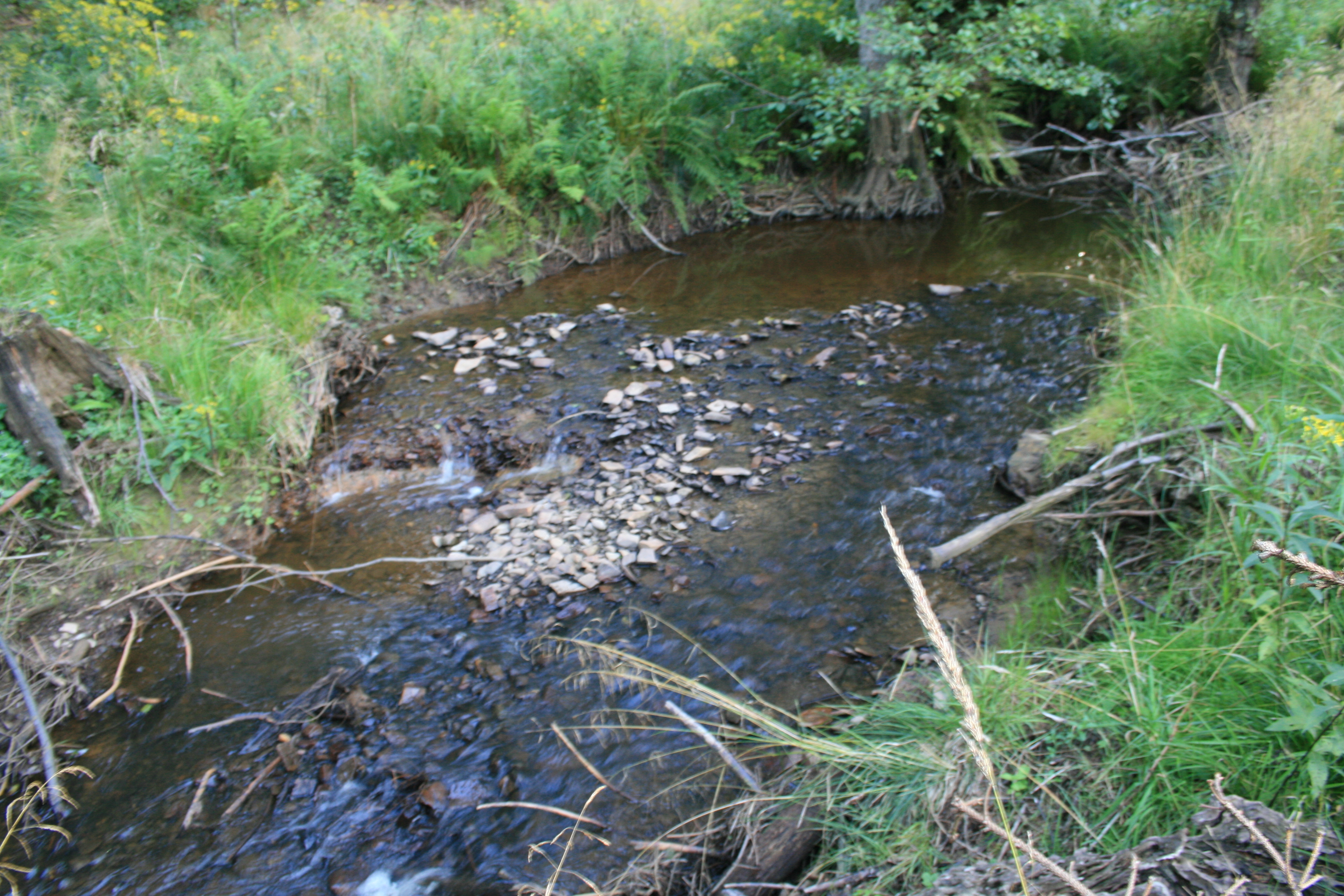

Location
- Country: Germany
- State: North Rhine-Westphalia

Physical characteristics
- Mouth
  - location: Alme
  - coordinates: 51.4886°N 8.5942°E
- Length: 7.6 km (4.7 mi)

Basin features
- Progression: Alme→ Lippe→ Rhine→ North Sea

Harlebach is a river of North Rhine-Westphalia, Germany. It is a 7.6-kilometre-long (4.7 mi) tributary of the river Alme in North Rhine-Westphalia, Germany. The Harlebach rises at 430 m (1,410 ft) above sea level in the Arnsberg forest, above Brilon. It joins the Alme through forested areas including the Almetal nature reserve. It acts as the boundary between Paderborn and Hochsauerlandkreis.

== See also ==
- List of rivers of North Rhine-Westphalia
