= Borstenbach =

River in Germany

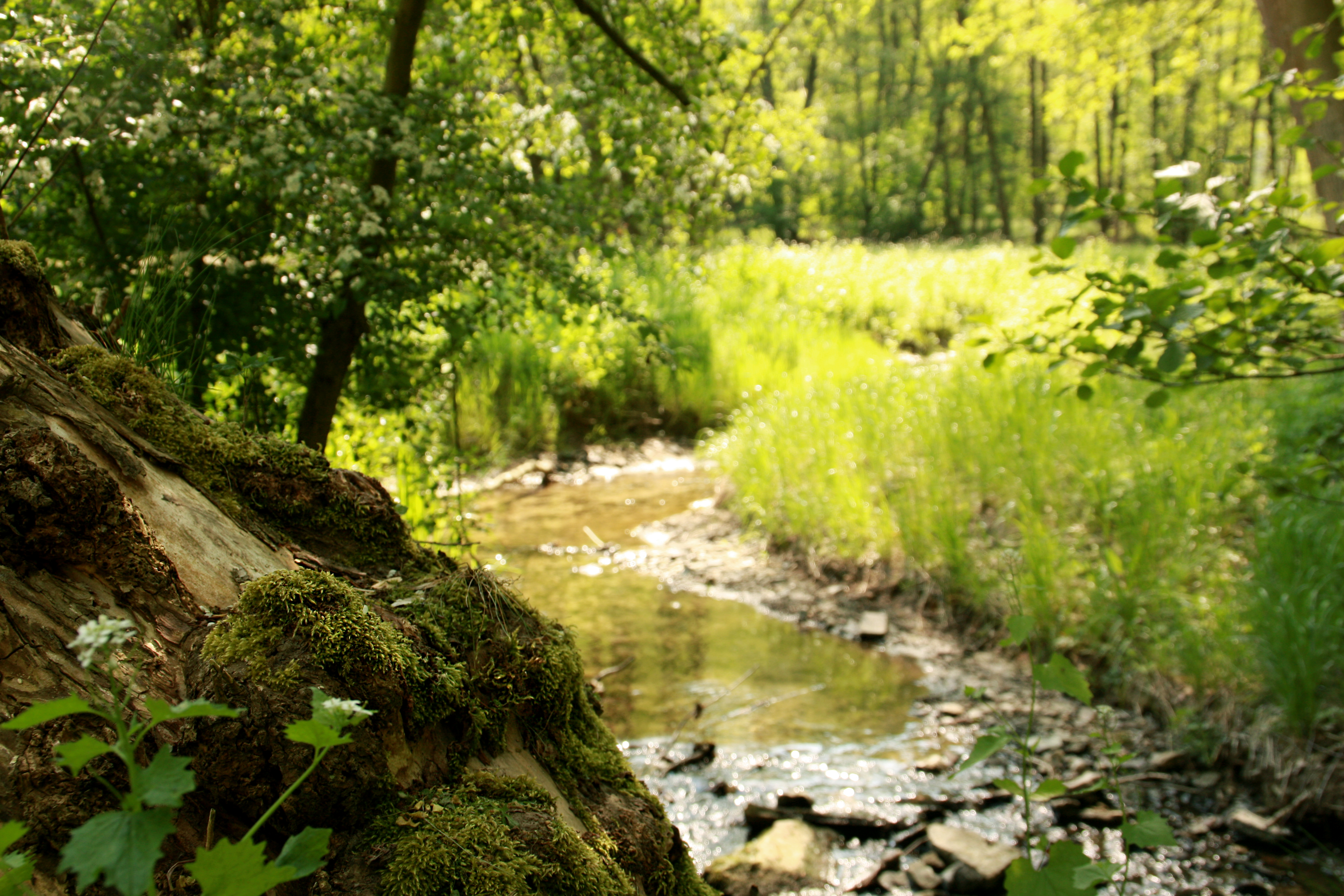

Location
- Country: Germany
- State: North Rhine-Westphalia

Physical characteristics
- Mouth
  - location: Weser
  - coordinates: 52.2167°N 8.8338°E

Basin features
- Progression: Weser→ North Sea

Borstenbach is a river of North Rhine-Westphalia, Germany. It flows into the Weser in Bad Oeynhausen.

== See also ==
- List of rivers of North Rhine-Westphalia
