= Künsebecker Bach =

River in Germany

Location
- Country: Germany
- State: North Rhine-Westphalia

Physical characteristics
- Source
  - coordinates: 52°03′04″N 8°23′49″E
- Mouth
  - location: Rhedaer Bach
  - coordinates: 52.0125°N 8.2937°E
  - elevation: 249 ft (76 m)
- Length: 9.4 km (5.8 mi)

Basin features
- Progression: Rhedaer Bach→ Ems→ North Sea

Künsebecker Bach is a river located in North Rhine-Westphalia, Germany. It rises in Hengeberg in Halle and flows northeast from Kölkebeck.

== See also ==
- List of rivers of North Rhine-Westphalia
