= Menkebach =

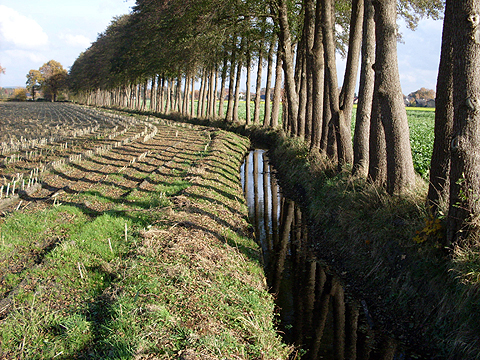

Location
- Country: Germany
- State: North Rhine-Westphalia

Physical characteristics
- Mouth
  - location: Dalke
  - coordinates: 51.9004°N 8.4380°E
- Length: 20.1 km (12.5 mi)

Basin features
- Progression: Dalke→ Ems→ North Sea

Menkebach is a river of North Rhine-Westphalia, Germany. It flows into the Dalke east of Gütersloh. It has a length of 20.1 km.

== See also ==
- List of rivers of North Rhine-Westphalia
