= Sennebach =

River in Germany

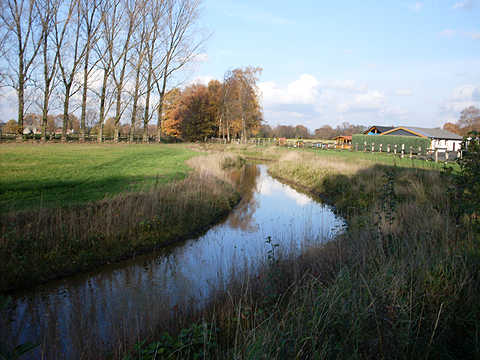

Location
- Country: Germany
- State: North Rhine-Westphalia

Physical characteristics
- Mouth
  - location: Ems
  - coordinates: 51.8119°N 8.4121°E
- Length: 25.5 km (15.8 mi)

Basin features
- Progression: Ems→ North Sea

Sennebach is a river of North Rhine-Westphalia, Germany. It flows into the Ems in Rietberg.

== See also ==
- List of rivers of North Rhine-Westphalia
