= Casumer Bach =

River in Germany

- North Rhine-Westphalia

Location
- Country: Germany
- State: North Rhine-Westphalia

Physical characteristics
- Mouth
  - location: Hessel
  - coordinates: 52.0495°N 8.2459°E
- Length: 7.2 km (4.5 mi)

Basin features
- Progression: Hessel→ Ems→ North Sea

Casumer Bach is a river of North Rhine-Westphalia, Germany. It is approximately 7.2 km long and flows directly into the Hessel east of Versmold.

== See also ==
- List of rivers of North Rhine-Westphalia
