= Lutter (Ems) =

River in Germany

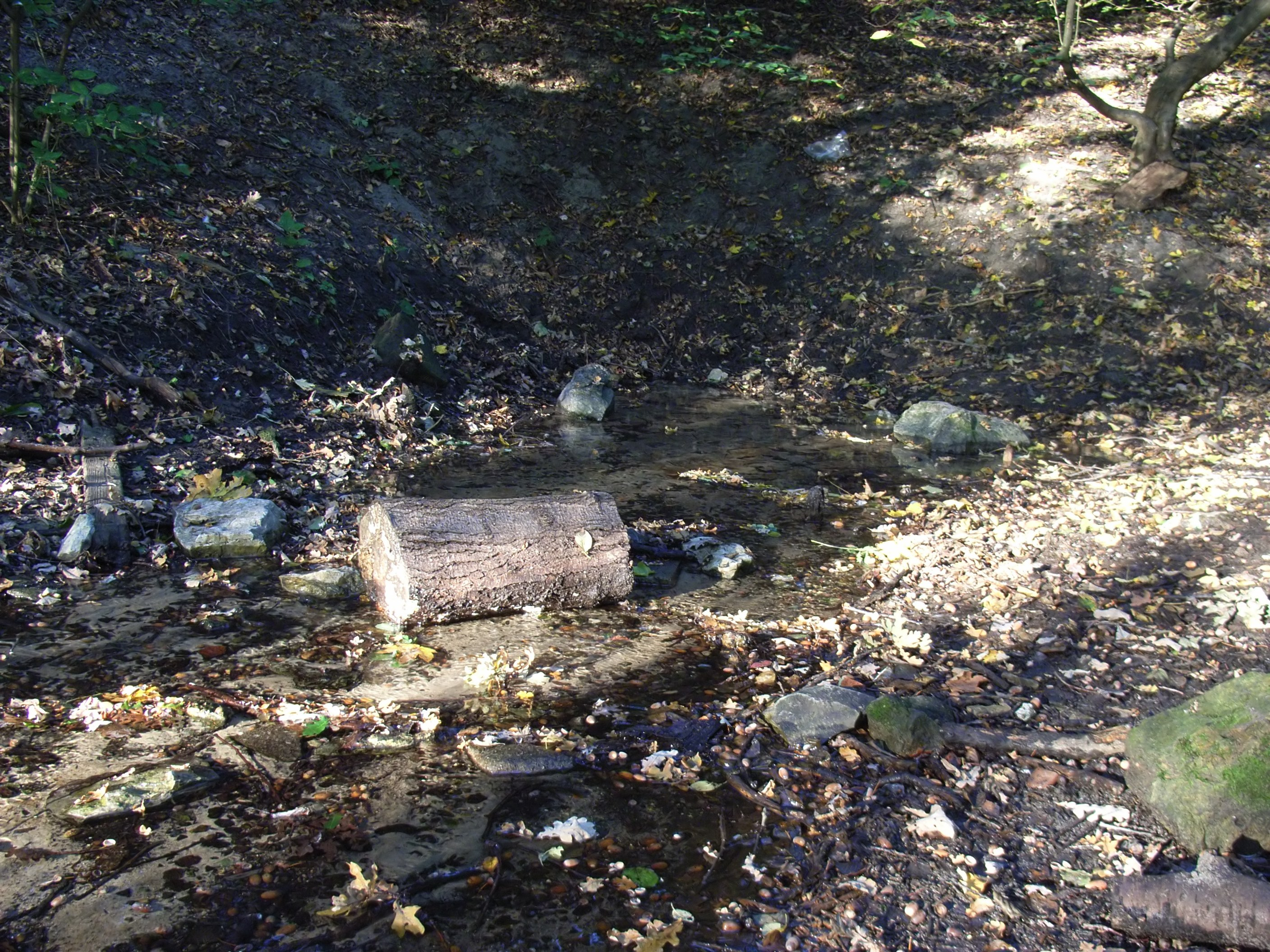

Location
- Country: Germany
- State: North Rhine-Westphalia

Physical characteristics
- Mouth
  - location: Ems
  - coordinates: 51.9491°N 8.2089°E
- Length: 26.0 km (16.2 mi)

Basin features
- Progression: Ems→ North Sea

Lutter (German pronunciation: [ˈlʊtɐ]) is a river of North Rhine-Westphalia, Germany. It is a right tributary of the Ems in Harsewinkel.

== See also ==
- List of rivers of North Rhine-Westphalia
