= Emmer (Weser) =

River in Germany

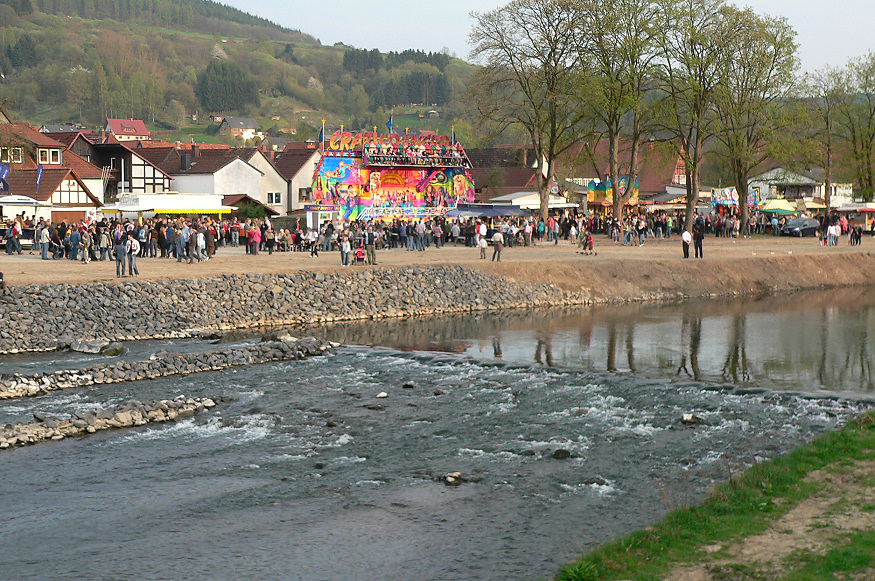
- The Emmer in Lügde

Location
- Country: Germany
- State: Lower Saxony

Physical characteristics
- Mouth
  - location: Weser
  - coordinates: 52.0568°N 9.3813°E
- Length: 61.7 km (38.3 mi)
- Basin size: 535 km (332 mi)

Basin features
- Progression: Weser→ North Sea

Emmer is a river of Lower Saxony and North Rhine-Westphalia, Germany. It flows into the Weser in Emmerthal.

== See also ==
- List of rivers of Lower Saxony
- List of rivers of North Rhine-Westphalia
