= Wapelbach =

River in Germany

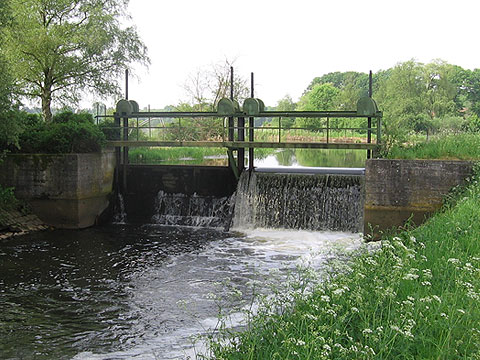

Location
- Country: Germany
- State: North Rhine-Westphalia

Physical characteristics
- Mouth
  - location: Dalke
  - coordinates: 51.9042°N 8.3244°E
- Length: 35.5 km (22.1 mi)
- Basin size: 165 km^{2} (64 sq mi)

Basin features
- Progression: Dalke→ Ems→ North Sea

Wapelbach (also: Wapel) is a river of North Rhine-Westphalia, Germany. It flows into the Dalke west of Gütersloh.

== See also ==
- List of rivers of North Rhine-Westphalia
