= Werre =

River in Germany

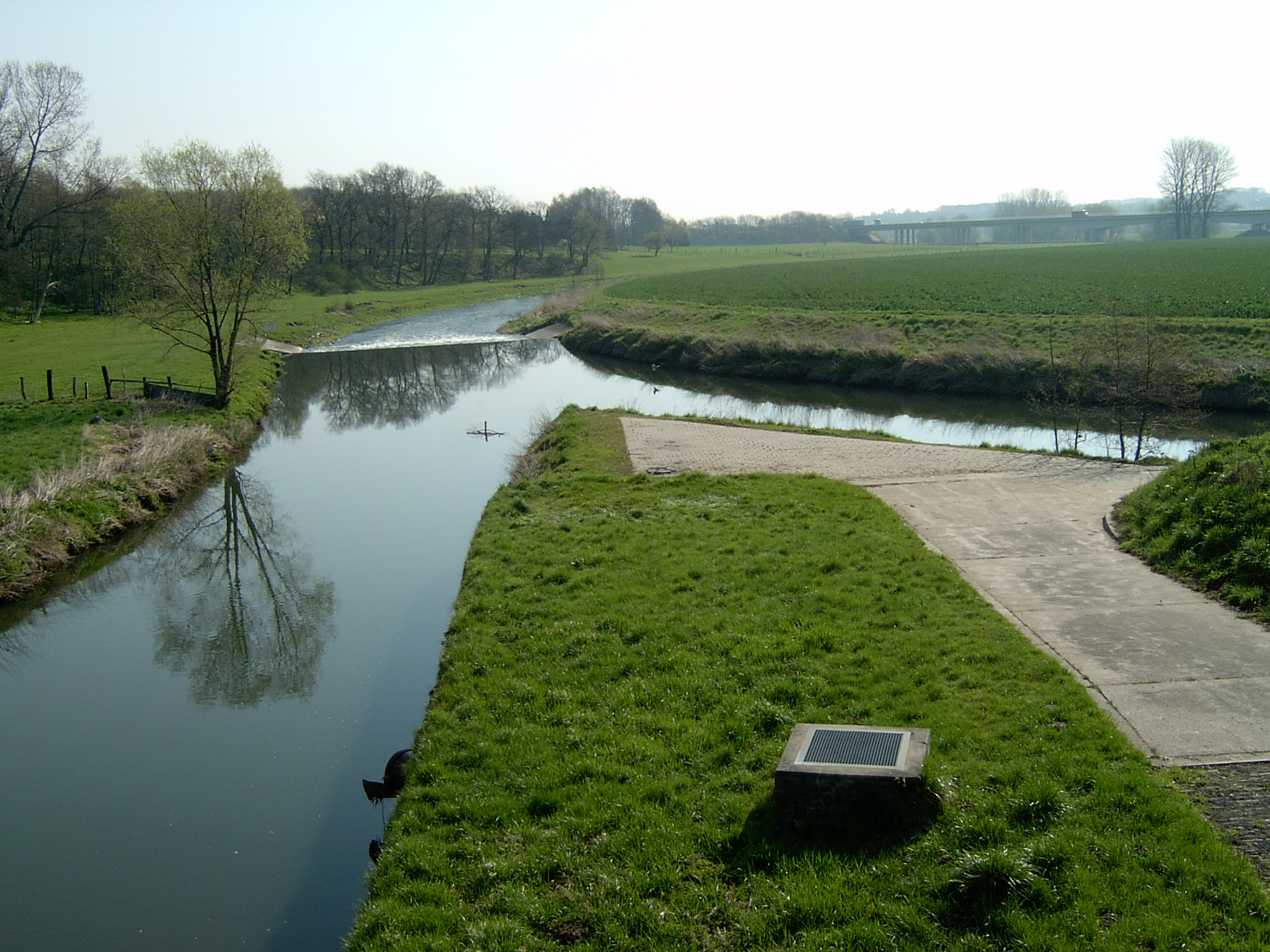
- Confluence of the rivers Else and Werre (right)

Location
- Country: Germany
- State: North Rhine-Westphalia

Physical characteristics
- Source
  - location: Eggegebirge
  - coordinates: 51°54′38″N 8°59′31″E
- Mouth
  - location: Weser
  - coordinates: 52°13′16″N 8°49′40″E
- Length: 71.9 km (44.7 mi)
- Basin size: 1,486 km^{2} (574 sq mi)

Basin features
- Progression: Weser→ North Sea
- Tributaries
  - left: Aa, Else
  - right: Bega

The Werre (German pronunciation: [ˈvɛʁə]) is a river in the Detmold region (Regierungsbezirk) of North Rhine-Westphalia, Germany, left tributary of the Weser. Its source is near Horn-Bad Meinberg. The total length of the Werre is 71.9 km.

The Werre flows generally north through the towns Detmold, Lage, Bad Salzuflen, Herford and Löhne. It flows into the Weser close to Bad Oeynhausen. It crosses the districts of Lippe, Herford and Minden-Lübbecke.

== Former sections ==
The Bowerre is a former branch of the river Werre in Herford, which previously formed the border between the Altstadt (old town) and Neustadt (new town). It was filled in 1972.
