= Habighorster Bach =

River in Germany

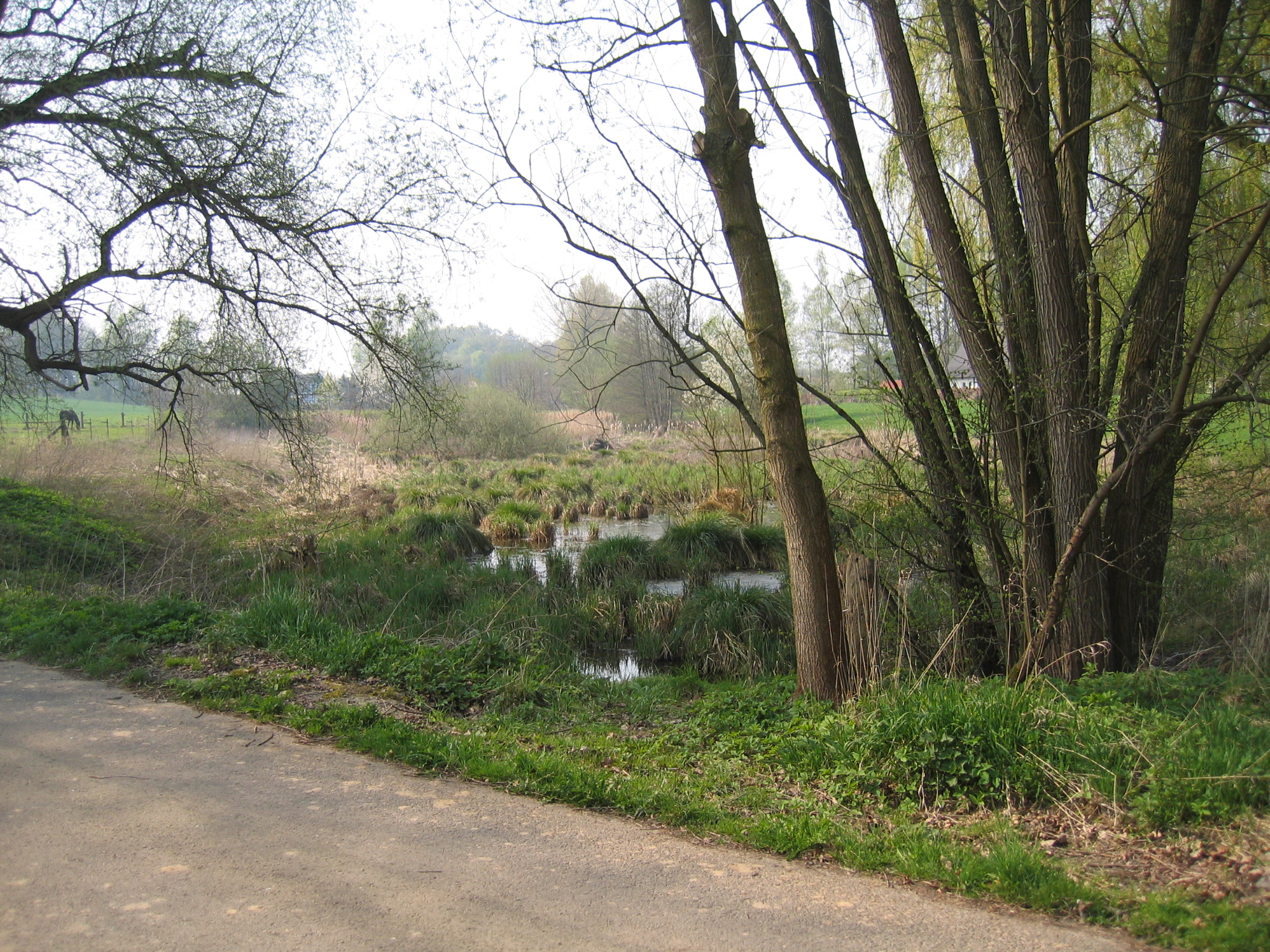

Location
- Country: Germany
- States: North Rhine-Westphalia

Physical characteristics
- Mouth
  - location: Gewinghauser Bach
  - coordinates: 52.2197°N 8.5600°E

Basin features
- Progression: Gewinghauser Bach→ Else→ Werre→ Weser→ North Sea

Habighorster Bach is a small river of North Rhine-Westphalia, Germany. It is 2.8 km long and flows into the Gewinghauser Bach near Bünde.

== See also ==
- List of rivers of North Rhine-Westphalia
