= Dornmühlenbach =

River in Germany

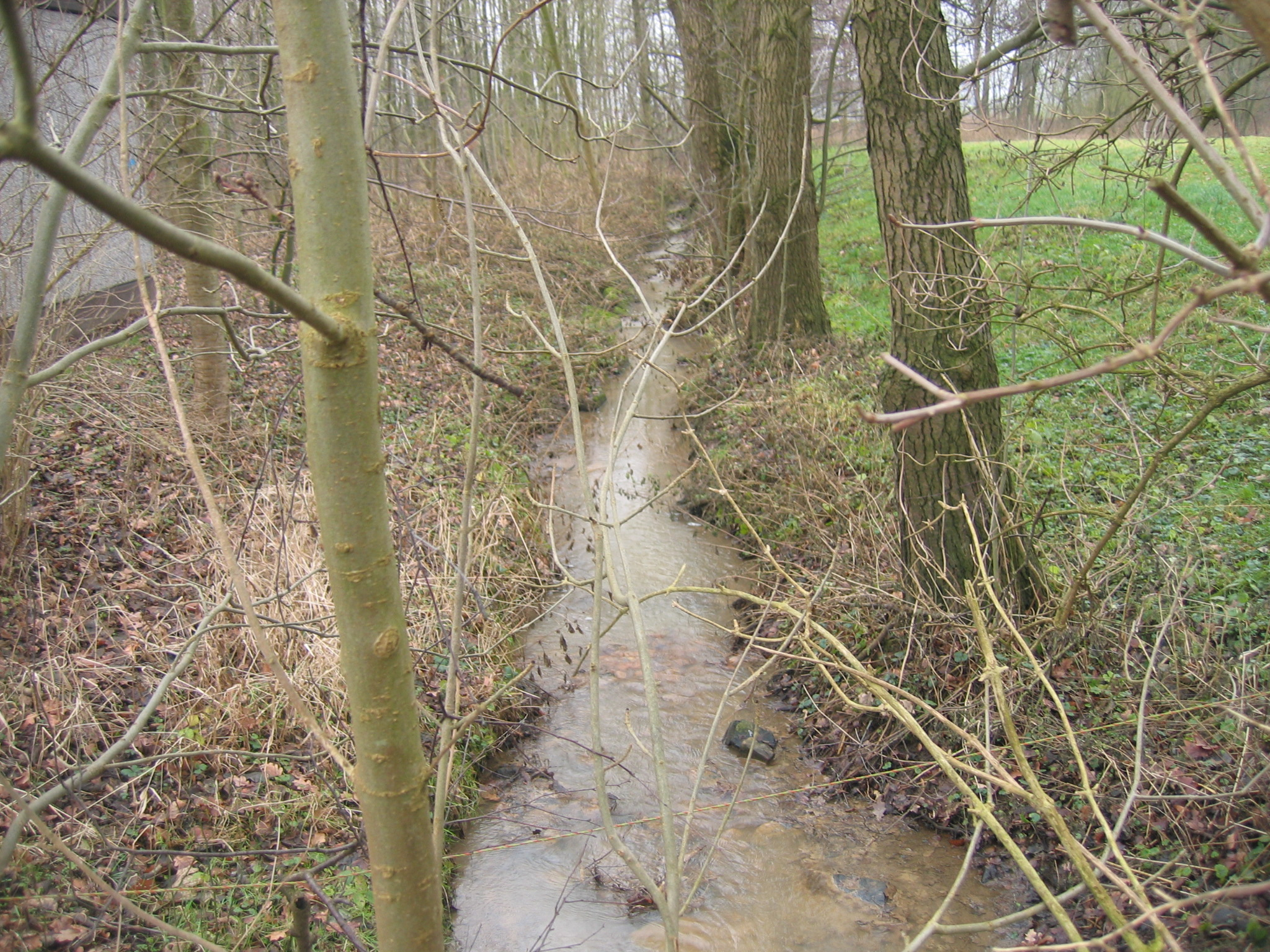

Location
- Country: Germany
- State: North Rhine-Westphalia

Physical characteristics
- Mouth
  - location: Darmühlenbach
  - coordinates: 52.2226°N 8.4917°E

Basin features
- Progression: Darmühlenbach→ Else→ Werre→ Weser→ North Sea

Dornmühlenbach is a river of North Rhine-Westphalia, Germany. It is 2.5 km long and a right tributary of the Darmühlenbach.

== See also ==
- List of rivers of North Rhine-Westphalia
