= Sunderbach =

Sunderbach may refer to:

- Sunderbach (Trüggelbach), a river of North Rhine-Westphalia, Germany, tributary of the Trüggelbach
- Sunderbach (Else), a river of North Rhine-Westphalia, Germany, tributary of that Else which is a tributary of the Werre
