= Eselsbach =

Eselsbach may refer to following rivers of Germany:

- Eselsbach (Else) of North Rhine-Westphalia, left tributary of the Else
- Eselsbach (Warmenau) of North Rhine-Westphalia, right tributary of the Warmenau
- Eselsbach (Ette) of Baden-Württemberg, headstream of the Ette
- Eselsbach (Großbach) of Rhineland-Palatinate, tributary of the Großbach
