= Ostbach =

Ostbach may refer to:

- Ostbach (Else), a river of North Rhine-Westphalia, Germany, tributary of the Else
- Ostbach (Emscher), a river of North Rhine-Westphalia, Germany, tributary of the Emscher
