= Grippenbach =

River in Germany

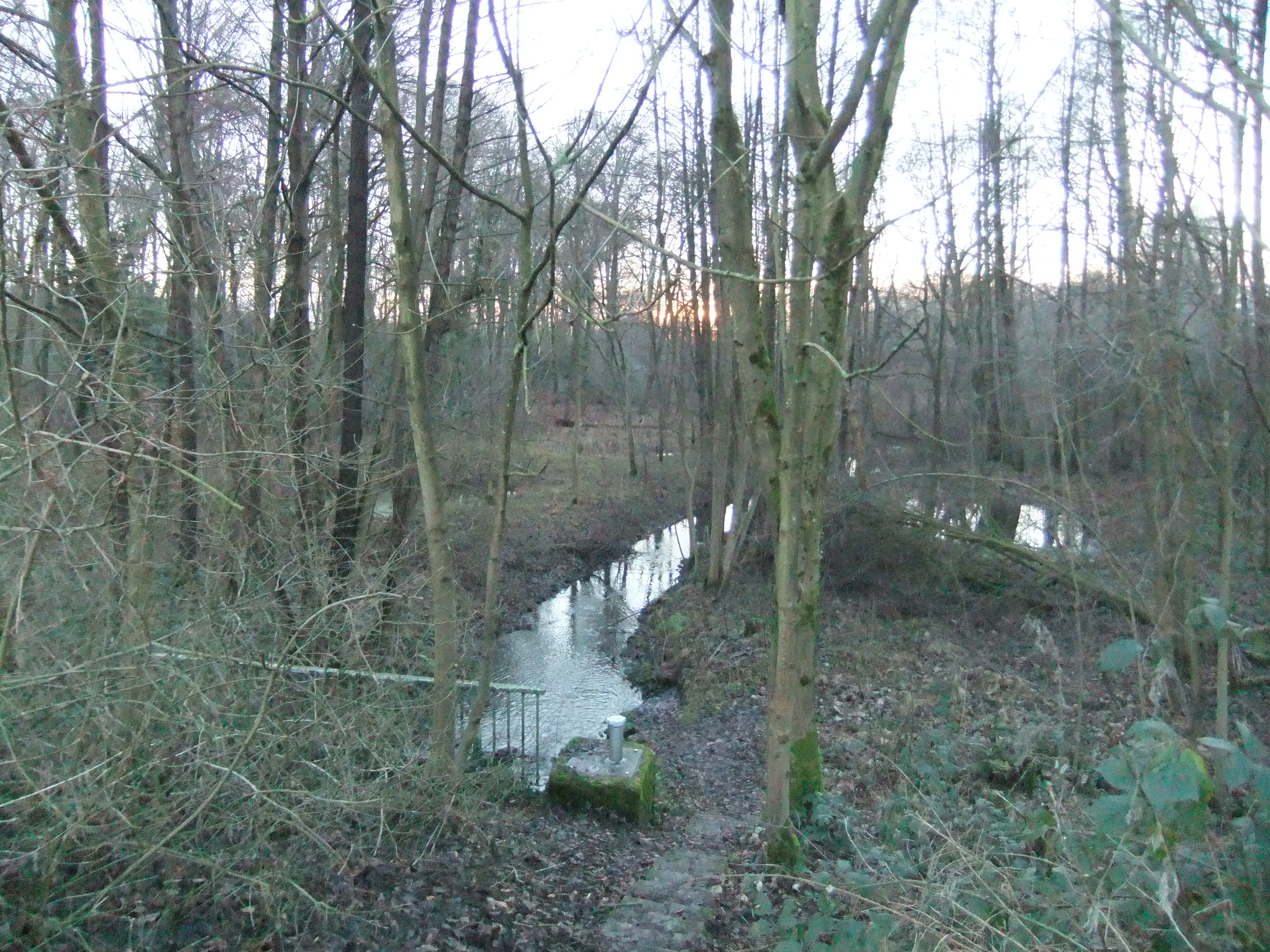

Location
- Country: Germany
- States: North Rhine-Westphalia

Physical characteristics
- Mouth
  - location: Sunderbach
  - coordinates: 51.9698°N 8.4745°E

Basin features
- Progression: Sunderbach→ Trüggelbach→ Lutter→ Ems→ North Sea

Grippenbach is a small river of North Rhine-Westphalia, Germany. It is 2.3 km long and flows into the Sunderbach near Bielefeld-Ummeln.

== See also ==
- List of rivers of North Rhine-Westphalia
