= Grenzbach (Darmühlenbach) =

River in Germany

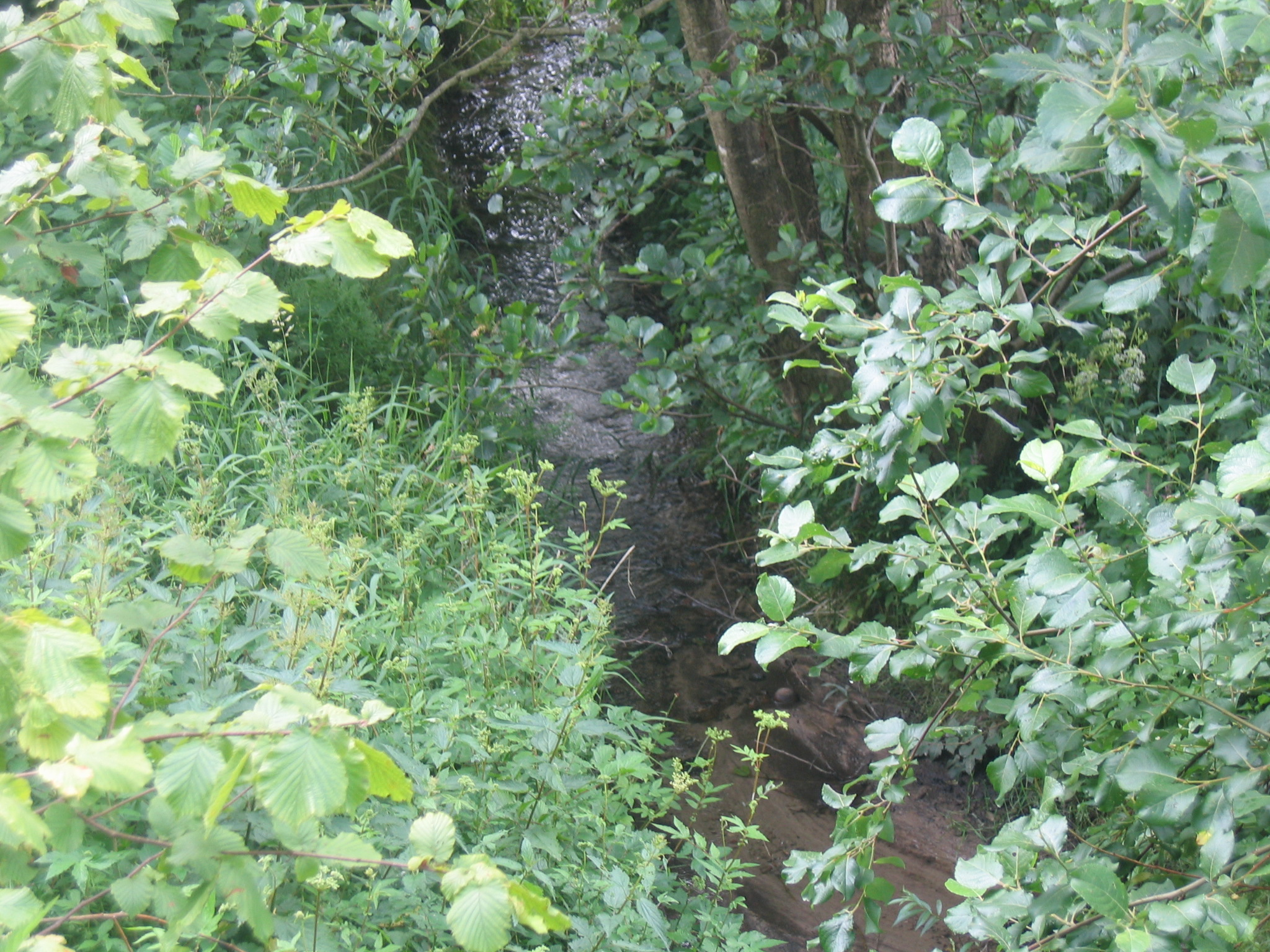

Location
- Country: Germany
- States: North Rhine-Westphalia

Physical characteristics
- Mouth
  - location: Darmühlenbach
  - coordinates: 52.2308°N 8.5225°E

Basin features
- Progression: Darmühlenbach→ Else→ Werre→ Weser→ North Sea

Grenzbach is a river of North Rhine-Westphalia, Germany. It is 1.3 km long and a left tributary of the Darmühlenbach.

== Similar streams by name ==
It should not be confused with the ten other streams in North Rhine-Westphalia named Grenzbach. These are tributaries of the Bach vom Dachsberg, Gausbach, Rinderbach (Ruhr), Lippe, Schölsbach, Mühlengraben, Linnebach, Babenhauser Bach, Ostbach (Else) and Rhine.

== See also ==
- List of rivers of North Rhine-Westphalia
