= Moorbach (Werfener Bach) =

River in North Rhine-Westphalia, Germany

Location
- Country: Germany
- State: North Rhine-Westphalia

Physical characteristics
- Mouth
  - location: Werfener Bach
  - coordinates: 52.1825°N 8.5383°E
- Length: 3.3 km (2.1 mi)

Basin features
- Progression: Werfener Bach→ Else→ Werre→ Weser→ North Sea

Moorbach is a river of North Rhine-Westphalia, Germany. It is a tributary of the Werfener Bach near Bünde.

== See also ==
- List of rivers of North Rhine-Westphalia
