= Turgay Gölbaşı =

Turkish footballer

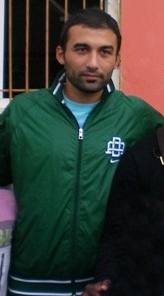

Personal information
- Date of birth: 6 January 1983 (age 43)
- Place of birth: Bünde, Germany
- Height: 1.82 m (5 ft 11 1/2 in)
- Position: Midfielder

Senior career*
Years	Team	Apps	(Gls)
2001–2004	FSC Lohfelden		
2004–2005	KSV Baunatal	32	(2)
2005–2007	KSV Hessen Kassel	62	(2)
2007–2008	Çaykur Rizespor	1	(0)
2008	→ KSV Hessen Kassel (loan)	14	(0)
2008–2011	Samsunspor	91	(5)
2011–2012	Karşıyaka	14	(1)
2012	Gaziantep BB	15	(0)
2012–2014	Samsunspor	47	(1)
2014–2017	Kocaeli Birlik	84	(7)
2017–2018	Nazilli Belediyespor	9	(0)
2018	Tuzlaspor	9	(0)
- * Club domestic league appearances and goals

Turgay Gölbaşı (born 6 January 1983) is a German-born Turkish former footballer.
