= I Gotcha Now =

Song by Lynsey de Paul

"I Gotcha Now" is a song written by Lynsey de Paul and released as a single by Zakatek (Lenny Zakatek) on the Bell Records label on 2 March 1973. The release of the single received interest from the British music press. The song features a pounding piano (possibly played by de Paul), fuzz guitar and "I Am the Walrus"-esque strings. De Paul's own demo of the song, with the title "Got You Here Now" and recorded at Orange Studios, London, by David Humphries in early 1973 resurfaced in 2022 and features a xylophone in place of the piano break in the middle of the song. The B-side is also a de Paul song, "So Good To You", and both songs were recorded at 10cc's Strawberry Studios with Eric Stewart, the lead guitarist and singer of The Mindbenders and later a member of 10cc, being the co-engineer. De Paul recorded her own version of "So Good To You" and released it in October 1973 as the flip side to her single "Won't Somebody Dance with Me". In Japan, this was the A-side of the release. Both songs were however, originally written by de Paul for Zakatek (as was the follow-up single "Get Your Gun"), after she co-discovered him together with the actor Dudley Moore, her boyfriend at the time. However, some years later de Paul revealed that she had offered "I Gotcha Now" to Slade. Lenny Zakatek discussed recording the song in an interview given to Black Music & Jazz Review.

"I Gotcha Now" was released on CD for the first time in 2018 on the compilation album Mixed Up Minds Part Thirteen: Rock & Pop From the British Isles, 1969-1973, and also on the 2006 album, PopCycles Volume 4. The song is still played on the radio, most recently by KDVS based in Davis, California, KOOP in Austin, Texas and Jersey City's WFMU on the program "Wired Up!".
