= Eselsbach (Warmenau) =

River in North Rhine-Westphalia, Germany

Location
- Country: Germany
- State: North Rhine-Westphalia

Physical characteristics
- Mouth
  - location: Warmenau
  - coordinates: 52.1594°N 8.4828°E

Basin features
- Progression: Warmenau→ Else→ Werre→ Weser→ North Sea

Eselsbach is a river of North Rhine-Westphalia, Germany. It is a right tributary of the Warmenau, which it joins near Spenge.

== See also ==
- List of rivers of North Rhine-Westphalia
