= Westbach =

River in Germany

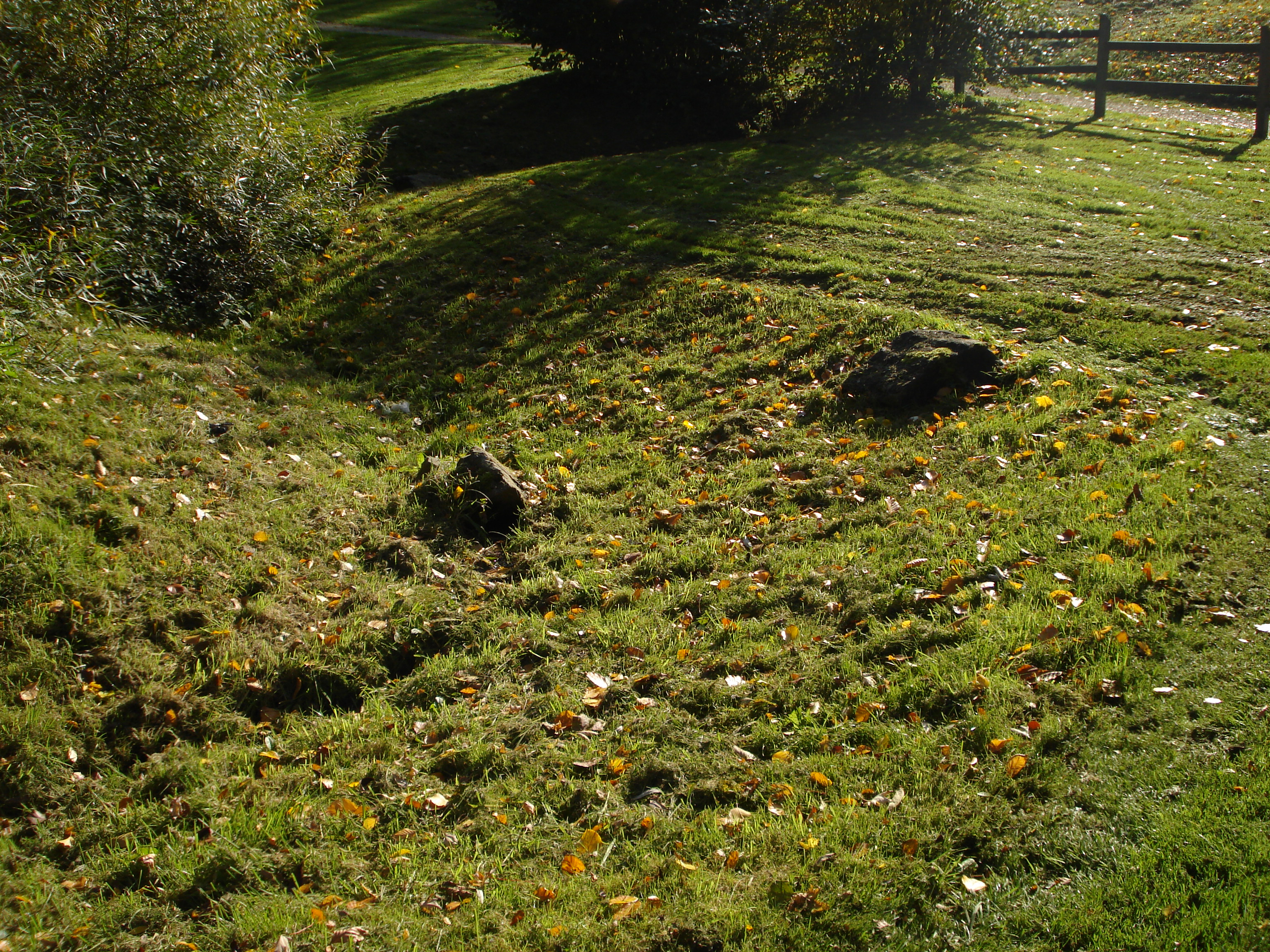

Location
- Country: Germany
- State: North Rhine-Westphalia

Physical characteristics
- Mouth: Ostbach
  - coordinates: 51.5464°N 7.2146°E

Basin features
- Progression: Ostbach→ Emscher→ Rhine→ North Sea

The Westbach is a river of North Rhine-Westphalia, Germany. It flows into the Ostbach in Herne.

== See also ==
- List of rivers of North Rhine-Westphalia
