= Markbach =

River in Germany

Location
- Country: Germany
- State: North Rhine-Westphalia

Physical characteristics
- Mouth
  - location: Else
  - coordinates: 52.1982°N 8.6265°E
- Length: 2.6 km (1.6 mi)

Basin features
- Progression: Else→ Werre→ Weser→ North Sea

Markbach is a small river of North Rhine-Westphalia, Germany. It flows into the Else in Kirchlengern.

== See also ==
- List of rivers of North Rhine-Westphalia
