= Knollerbach =

River in Germany

Location
- Country: Germany
- States: North Rhine-Westphalia

Physical characteristics
- Mouth
  - location: Else
  - coordinates: 52.2039°N 8.5908°E

Basin features
- Progression: Else→ Werre→ Weser→ North Sea

Knollerbach is a small river of North Rhine-Westphalia, Germany. It is 2.3 km long and flows into the Else as a left tributary in Bünde.

== See also ==
- List of rivers of North Rhine-Westphalia
