= Grenzbach =

Grenzbach may refer to:

- Charles Grenzbach (1923–2004), American sound engineer
- Grenzbach (Darmühlenbach), a river of North Rhine-Westphalia, Germany
- Grenzbach (Rhine), a tributary of the Seerhein of Lake Constance
