= Hücker Moor =

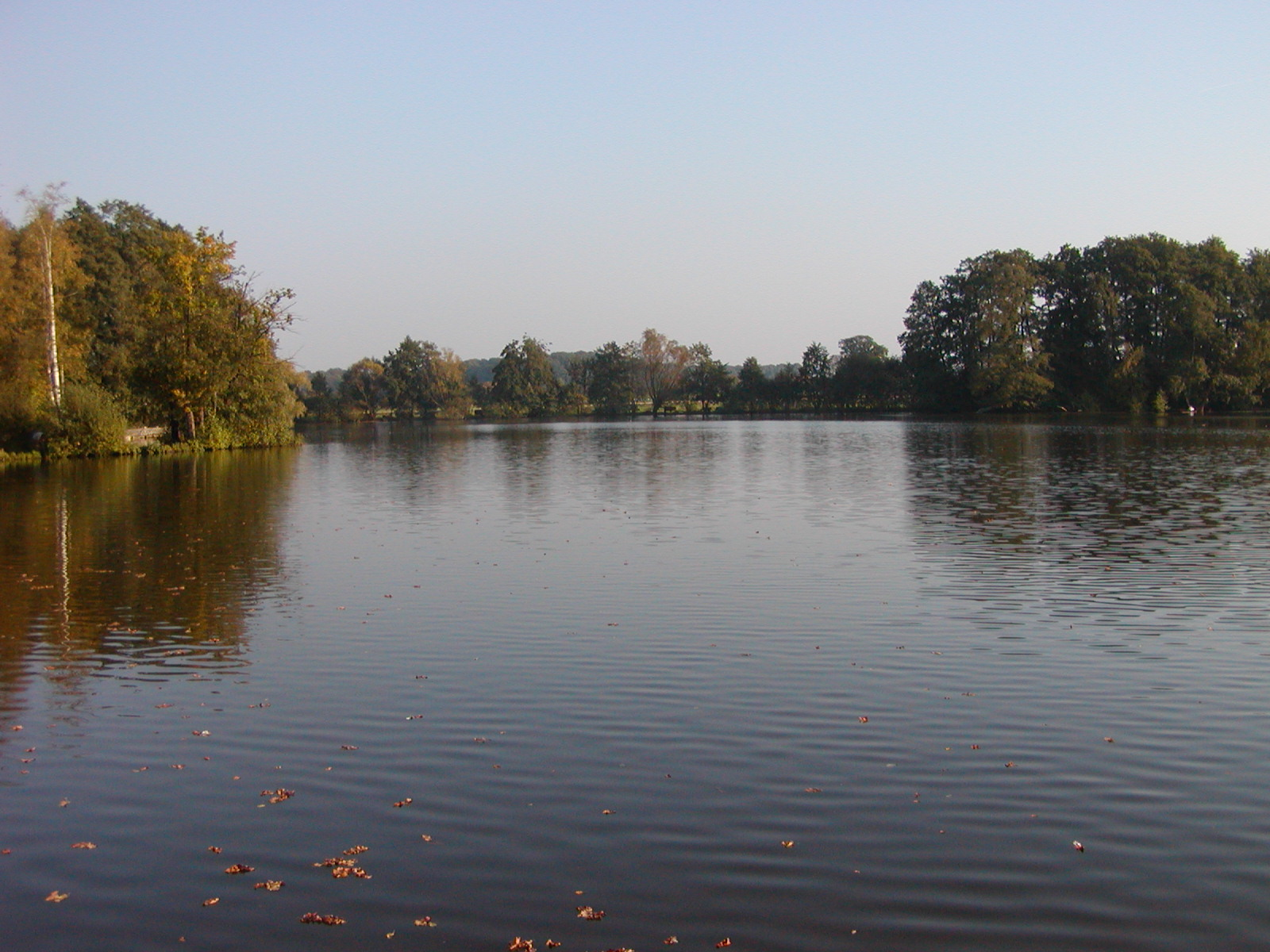

- Location within North Rhine-Westphalia
- Location: Hücker-Aschen, Spenge, Kreis Herford, North Rhine-Westphalia
- Coordinates: 52°10′40″N 8°31′16″E
- Primary inflows: Moorbach
- Primary outflows: Moorbach
- Basin countries: Germany
- Max. length: 450 m (1,480 ft)
- Surface area: 10.9 ha (27 acres)
- Average depth: 0.9 m (2 ft 11 in)
- Max. depth: 1.2 m (3 ft 11 in)
- Shore length^{1}: 2.6 km (1.6 mi)
- Surface elevation: 62.7 m (206 ft)
- ^{1} Shore length is not a well-defined measure.

Hücker Moor is a lake in Hücker-Aschen, Spenge, Kreis Herford, North Rhine-Westphalia, Germany. At an elevation of 62.7 m, its surface area is 10.9 ha.
