= Get Your Gun =

1973 single by Zakatek

"Get Your Gun" is a song written by Lynsey de Paul and Terry Cox. It was released as a single by Zakatek (a.k.a. Lenny Zakatek) on Bell Records on 12 October 1973. The b-side was another de Paul and Cox penned song "Gotta Runaway". Both sides were produced by de Paul and the strings were arranged by Christopher Gunning and de Paul. The single was reviewed by the British DJ John Peel for the music magazine Sounds. It has been described as "Freaky, bizarre and ultimately interesting and a definite one-off". In an interview some years later Lenny Zakatek said "I was singing at a night club called Gulivers In London five nights a week when Lynsey De Paul and Dudley Moore came in, they both thought I had the X-Factor, Lynsey introduced me to the legendary Dick Leahy (Billy Ocean, David Cassidy, Donna Summer, Wham, George Michael) and he signed me to his U.S.A. label Bell Records".

A German language version with the title "Roter Mann" with German lyrics written by Gunter Gabriel was released in 1974, also on Bell Records and sung by Zakatek. This version was released on the German compilation album, 1000 Nadelstiche - Amerikaner Und Briten Singen Deutsch (1000 pin pricks - Americans and Brits sing in German) on Bear Family Records in 2002.

The recording of the song was re-released, for the first time on CD as a track on the album Pop Cycles Vol. 12. The song still receives radio play, notably on WFMU's "Evan "Funk" Davies Show" on 21 June 2023.
