= Violenbach =

River in Germany

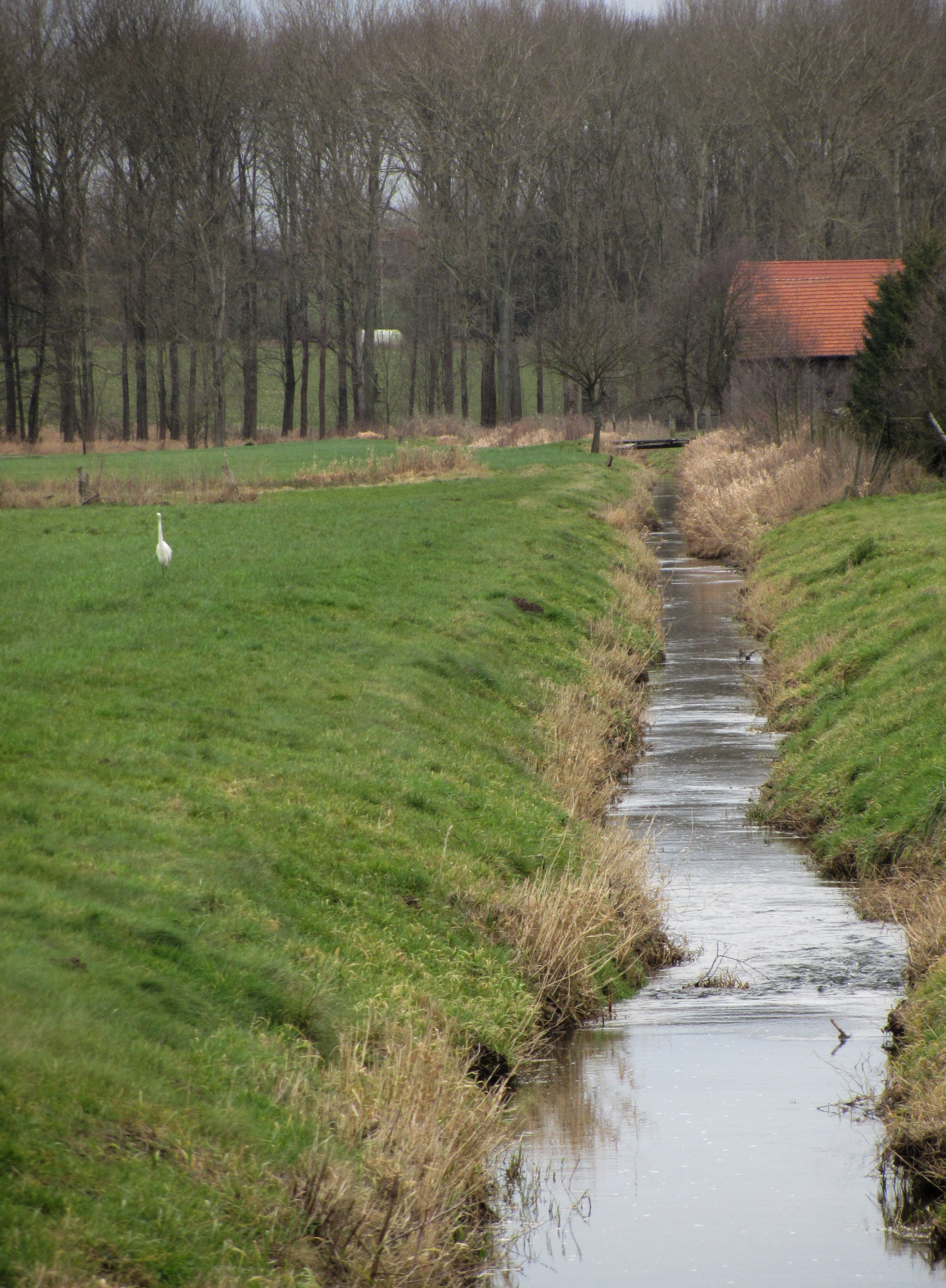

Location
- Country: Germany
- States: Lower Saxony; North Rhine-Westphalia

Physical characteristics
- Source
  - location: south of Borgholzhausen
  - coordinates: 52.0865°N 8.3157°E
- Mouth
  - location: Else
  - coordinates: 52.2020°N 8.3924°E
- Length: 20.2 km (12.6 mi)

Basin features
- Progression: Else→ Werre→ Weser→ North Sea

Violenbach is a river of Lower Saxony and North Rhine-Westphalia, Germany.

The violenbach springs south of Borgholzhausen. It is a right tributary of the Else east of Melle.

== See also ==
- List of rivers of Lower Saxony
- List of rivers of North Rhine-Westphalia
