= Warmenau =

River in Germany

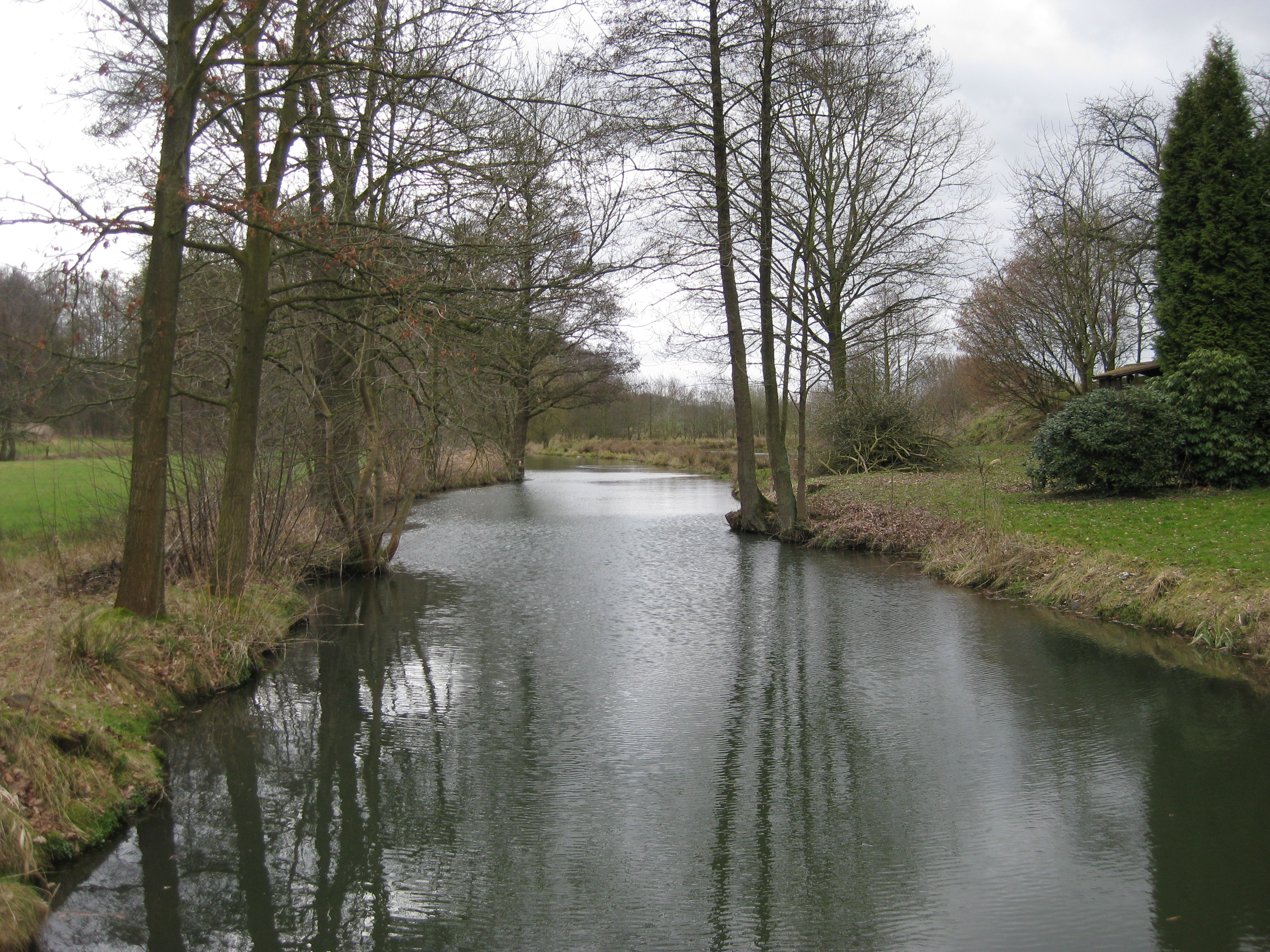

Location
- Country: Germany
- States: North Rhine-Westphalia; Lower Saxony

Physical characteristics
- Mouth
  - location: Else
  - coordinates: 52.1886°N 8.5067°E
- Length: 18.5 km (11.5 mi)

Basin features
- Progression: Else→ Werre→ Weser→ North Sea

Warmenau is a river of North Rhine-Westphalia and of Lower Saxony, Germany. It flows into the Else near Bünde.

== See also ==
- List of rivers of North Rhine-Westphalia
- List of rivers of Lower Saxony
