= Kilverbach =

River in Germany

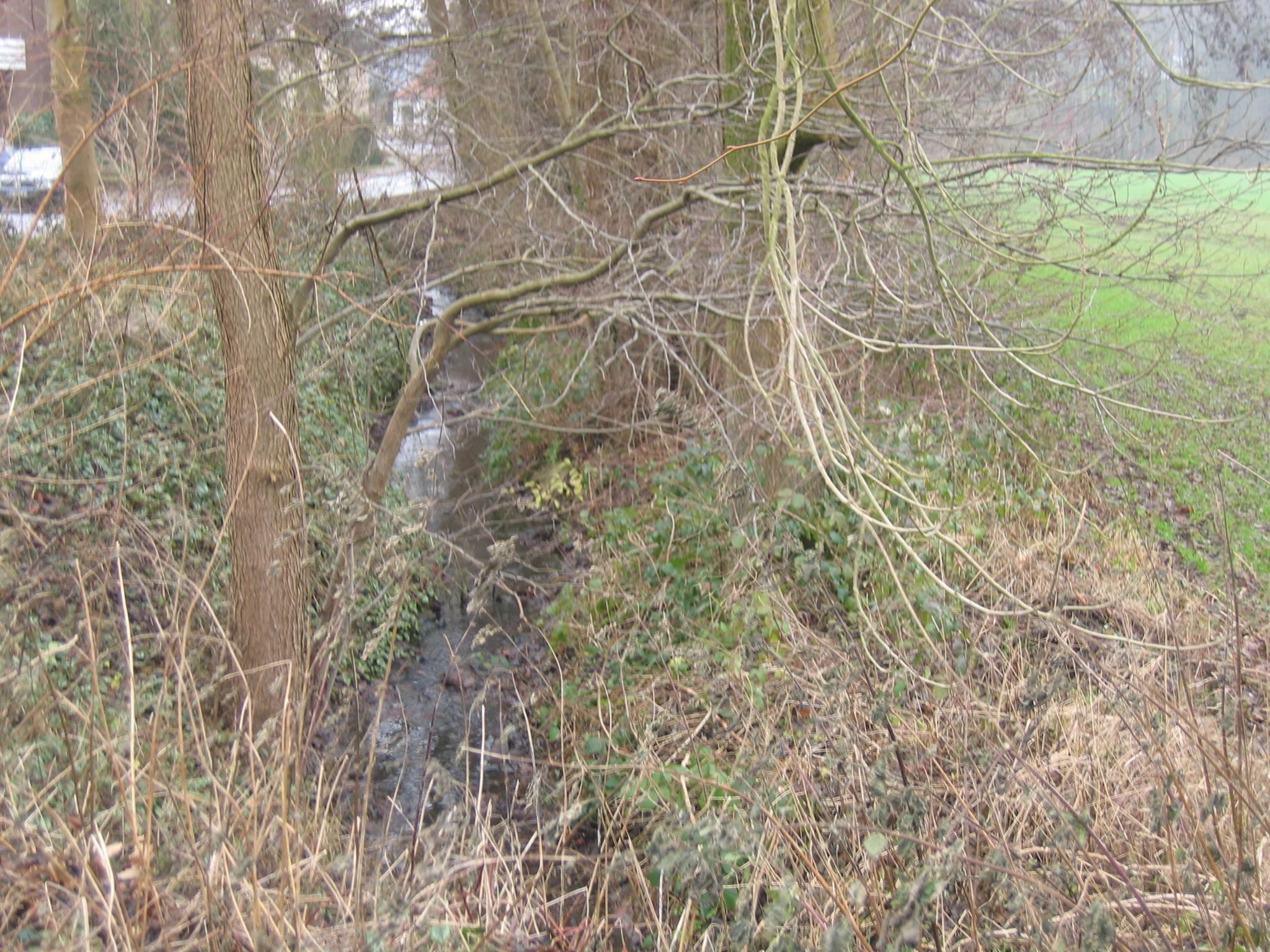

Location
- Country: Germany
- States: Lower Saxony; North Rhine-Westphalia

Physical characteristics
- Source
  - coordinates: 52°15′16″N 8°28′39″E
- Mouth
  - location: Else
  - coordinates: 52.2009°N 8.4530°E

Basin features
- Progression: Else→ Werre→ Weser→ North Sea

Kilverbach is a small river on the border of Lower Saxony and North Rhine-Westphalia, Germany. It is 8.4 km long and flows into the Else as a left tributary south of Rödinghausen.

== See also ==
- List of rivers of Lower Saxony
- List of rivers of North Rhine-Westphalia
