= Bennier Graben =

River in Germany

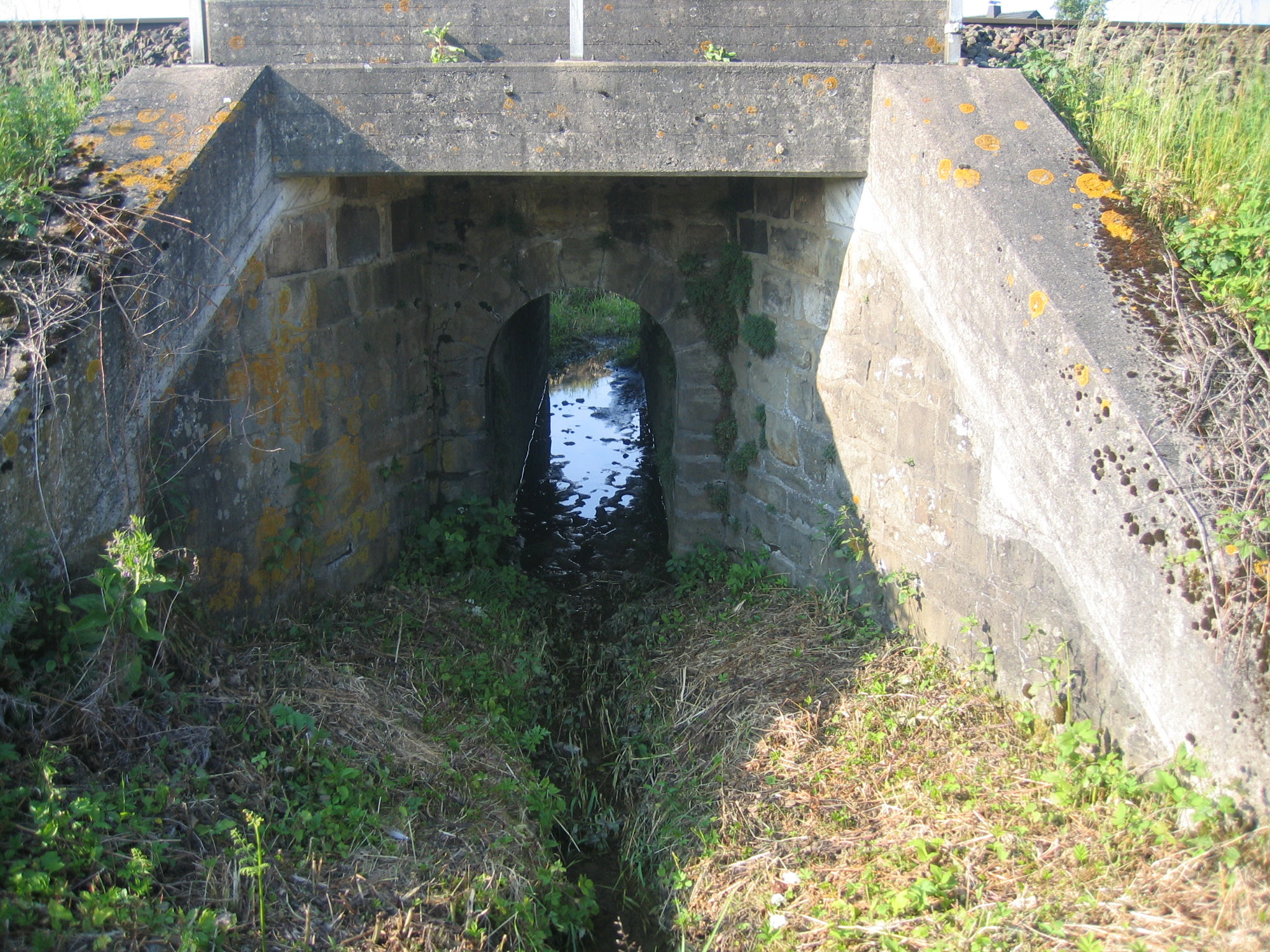

Location
- Country: Germany
- State: North Rhine-Westphalia

Physical characteristics
- Mouth
  - location: Else
  - coordinates: 52.1969°N 8.4689°E

Basin features
- Progression: Else→ Werre→ Weser→ North Sea

Bennier Graben is a small river in North Rhine-Westphalia, Germany. It flows into the Else near Bruchmühlen.

== See also ==
- List of rivers of North Rhine-Westphalia
