= Kirchlengern =

- Town
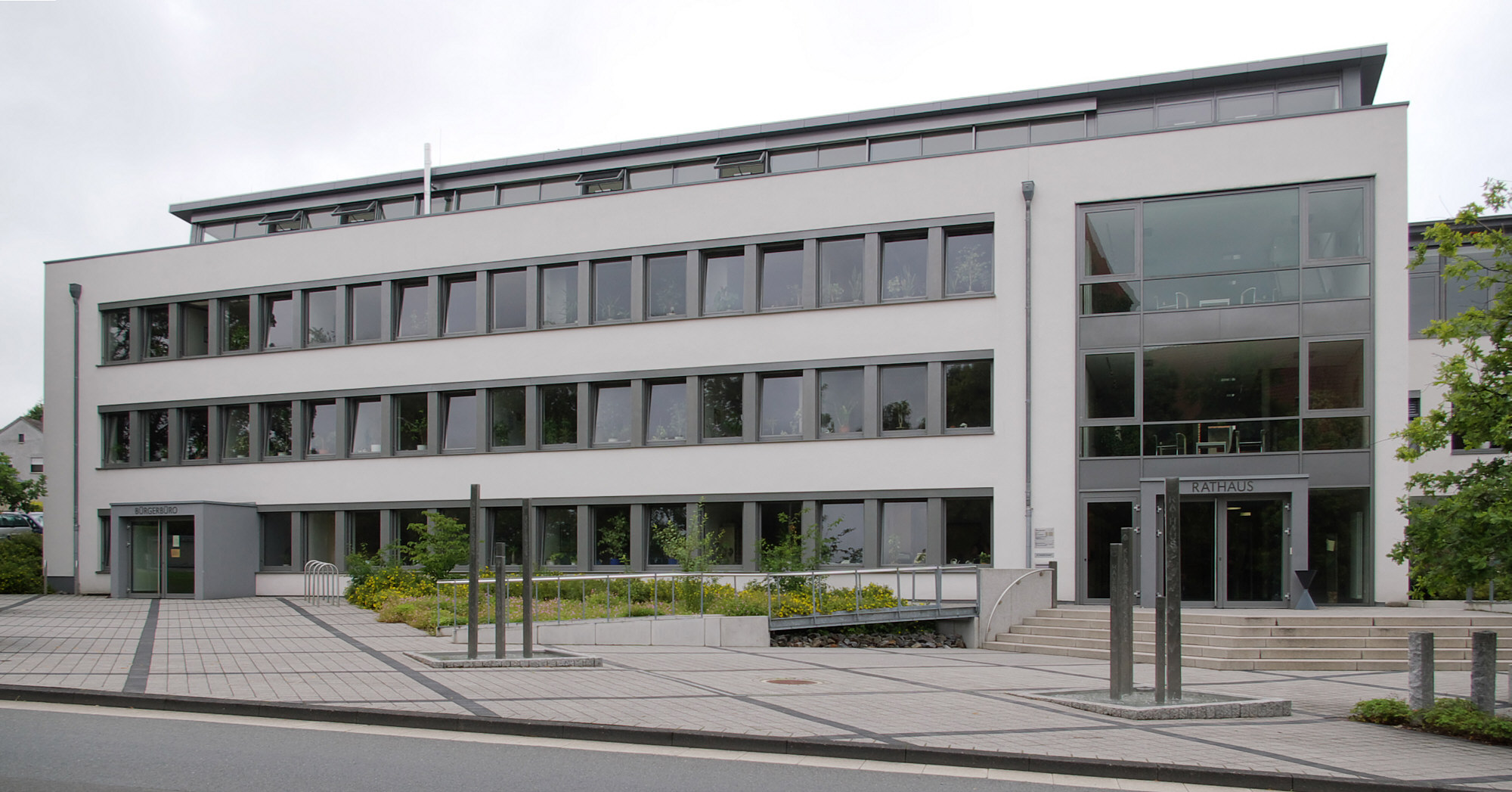
- Town hall

- Flag Coat of arms

- Location of Kirchlengern within Herford district
- Interactive map of Kirchlengern
- Location within Germany Location within North Rhine-Westphalia
- Coordinates: 52°12′00″N 08°37′59″E
- Country: Germany
- State: North Rhine-Westphalia
- Admin. region: Detmold
- District: Herford
- Subdivisions: 7

Government
  - Mayor (2020–25): Rüdiger Meier (CDU)

Area
  - Total: 33.78 km^{2} (13.04 sq mi)
- Elevation: 53 m (174 ft)

Population (2025-12-31)
  - Total: 16,263
  - Density: 481.4/km^{2} (1,247/sq mi)
- Time zone: UTC+01:00 (CET)
  - Summer (DST): UTC+02:00 (CEST)
- Postal codes: 32278
- Dialling codes: 05223 (Bünde)
- Vehicle registration: HF
- Website: www.kirchlengern.de

Kirchlengern (German pronunciation: [kɪʁçˈlɛŋɐn]; Low German: (Kirk-)Liörnern) is a municipality in the district of Herford, in North Rhine-Westphalia, Germany.

== Geography ==
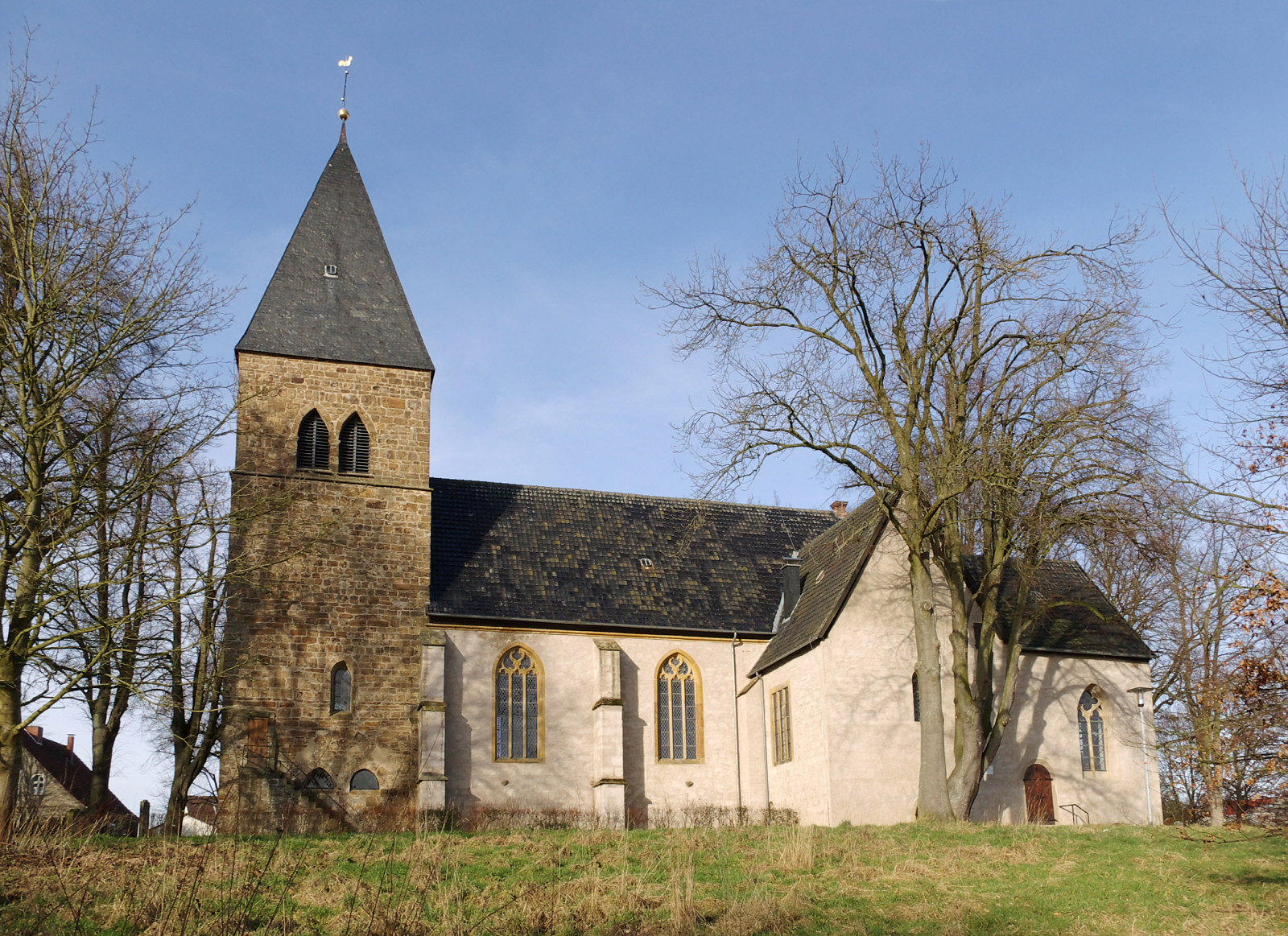
Lutheran Monastery Church of St. Mary's in Kirchlengern-Stift Quernheim

Kirchlengern is situated on the river Else, approx. 10 km north of Herford. The Brandbach flows into the Else in Kirchlengern.

=== Neighbouring places ===
- Hüllhorst
- Löhne
- Hiddenhausen
- Bünde

=== Division of the municipality ===
The municipality is divided in 7 districts:

1. Häver (1,900 inhabitants)
2. Kirchlengern (6,051 inhabitants)
3. Klosterbauerschaft (2,568 inhabitants)
4. Quernheim (1,549 inhabitants)
5. Rehmerloh (203 inhabitants)
6. Stift Quernheim (1,668 inhabitants)
7. Südlengern (3,154 inhabitants)

== Population ==
Historical population

Year	Pop.	±% p.a.
1965	13,265	—
1970	14,075	+1.19%
1975	14,595	+0.73%
1980	14,640	+0.06%
1985	14,354	−0.39%
1990	14,849	+0.68%
1995	15,589	+0.98%

Year	Pop.	±% p.a.
2000	16,170	+0.73%
2005	16,533	+0.45%
2010	16,100	−0.53%
2015	16,085	−0.02%
2020	16,081	−0.00%
2025	16,263	+0.23%

Source: Landesdatabank Nordrhein-Westfalen

== Mayors ==
- since 2004: Rüdiger Meier (CDU)
- 1999-2004: Werner Helmke (SPD)

== Notable people ==
- 1833–1900, Ernst Heinrich Lindemann, politician
- 1924–2003, Hellmuth Buddenberg, manager
- 1942–2017, Gunter Gabriel, singer
- 1953, Jürgen Klute, politician
- 1953, Reinhard Göhner, politician
- 1958, Elke Kruse, artist
- 1984, David Odonkor, footballer
