= Ahler Bruchgraben =

River in Germany

- Location of mouth

Location
- Country: Germany
- States: North Rhine-Westphalia and Lower Saxony
- Reference no.: DE: 466598

Physical characteristics
- Source
  - location: Near Ahle
  - coordinates: 52°15′09″N 8°11′39″E
  - elevation: ca. 98 m above sea level (NN)
- Mouth
  - location: Near Bruchmühlen (Lower Saxony) into the Else (KM16.3)
  - coordinates: 52°11′27″N 8°29′40″E
  - elevation: ca. 65 m above sea level (NN)
- Length: 3.1 km (1.9 mi)
- Basin size: 5.8 km^{2} (2.2 sq mi)

Basin features
- Progression: Else→ Werre→ Weser→ North Sea
- Landmarks: Large towns: Bünde, Melle; Villages: Rödinghausen

The Ahler Bruchgraben (also: Ahler Bruchbach) is a left tributary of the River Else in the northeast of the German federal states of North Rhine-Westphalia and Lower Saxony. The stream is part of the Weser basin and drains a small area of the Ravensberg Hills (Ravensberger Hügelland).

== See also ==
- List of rivers of North Rhine-Westphalia
- List of rivers of Lower Saxony
