= Brandbach =

River in Germany

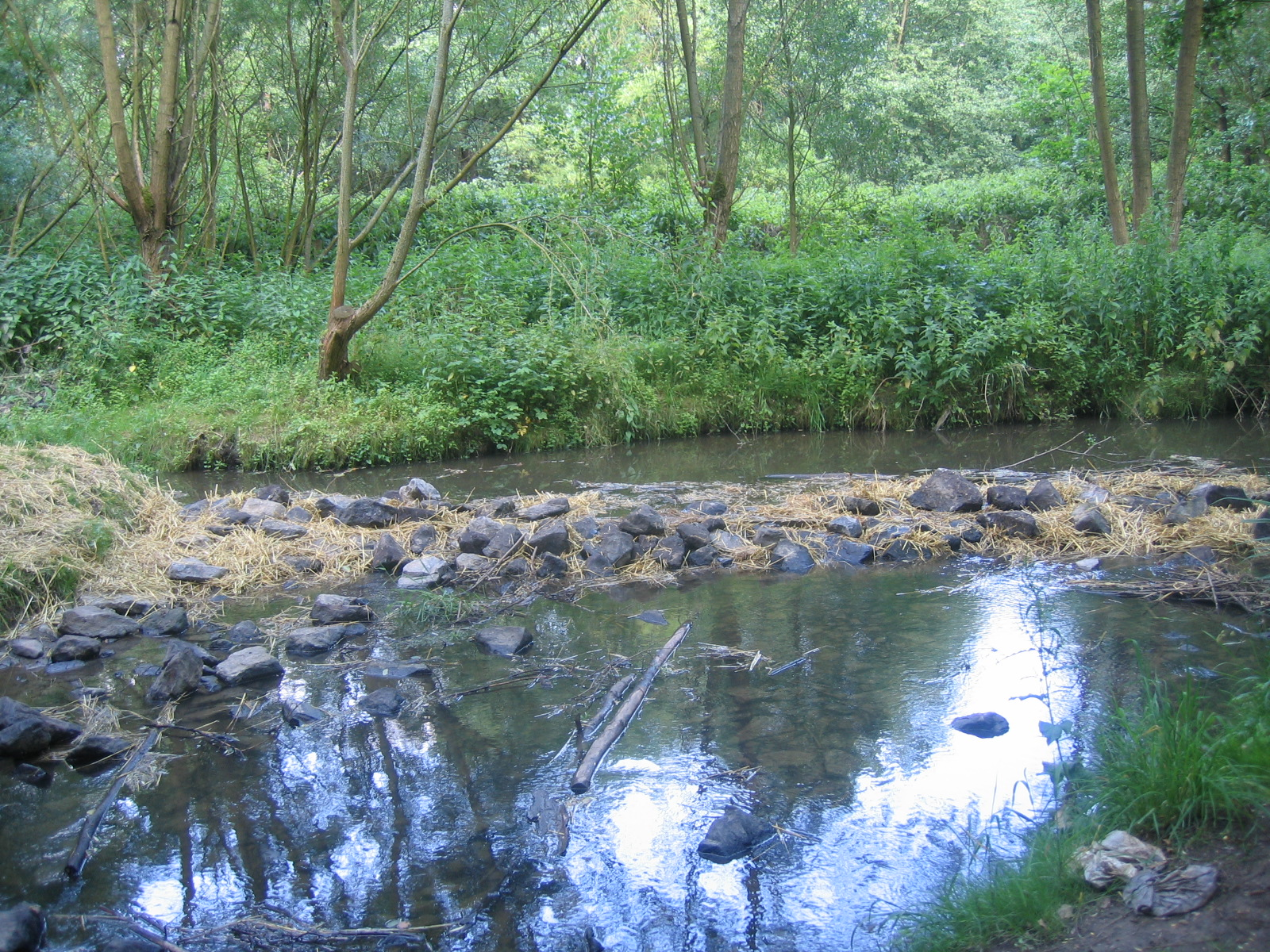
- Kilver, Bustedt, Hidenhausen

Location
- Country: Germany
- State: North Rhine-Westphalia

Physical characteristics
- Mouth
  - location: Else
  - coordinates: 52°11′53″N 08°38′05″E
- Length: 12.9 km (8.0 mi)

Basin features
- Progression: Else→ Werre→ Weser→ North Sea

The Brandbach is a river of North Rhine-Westphalia, Germany. It flows into the Else in Kirchlengern, in the district of Herford.

== See also ==
- List of rivers of North Rhine-Westphalia
