= Gunter Gabriel =

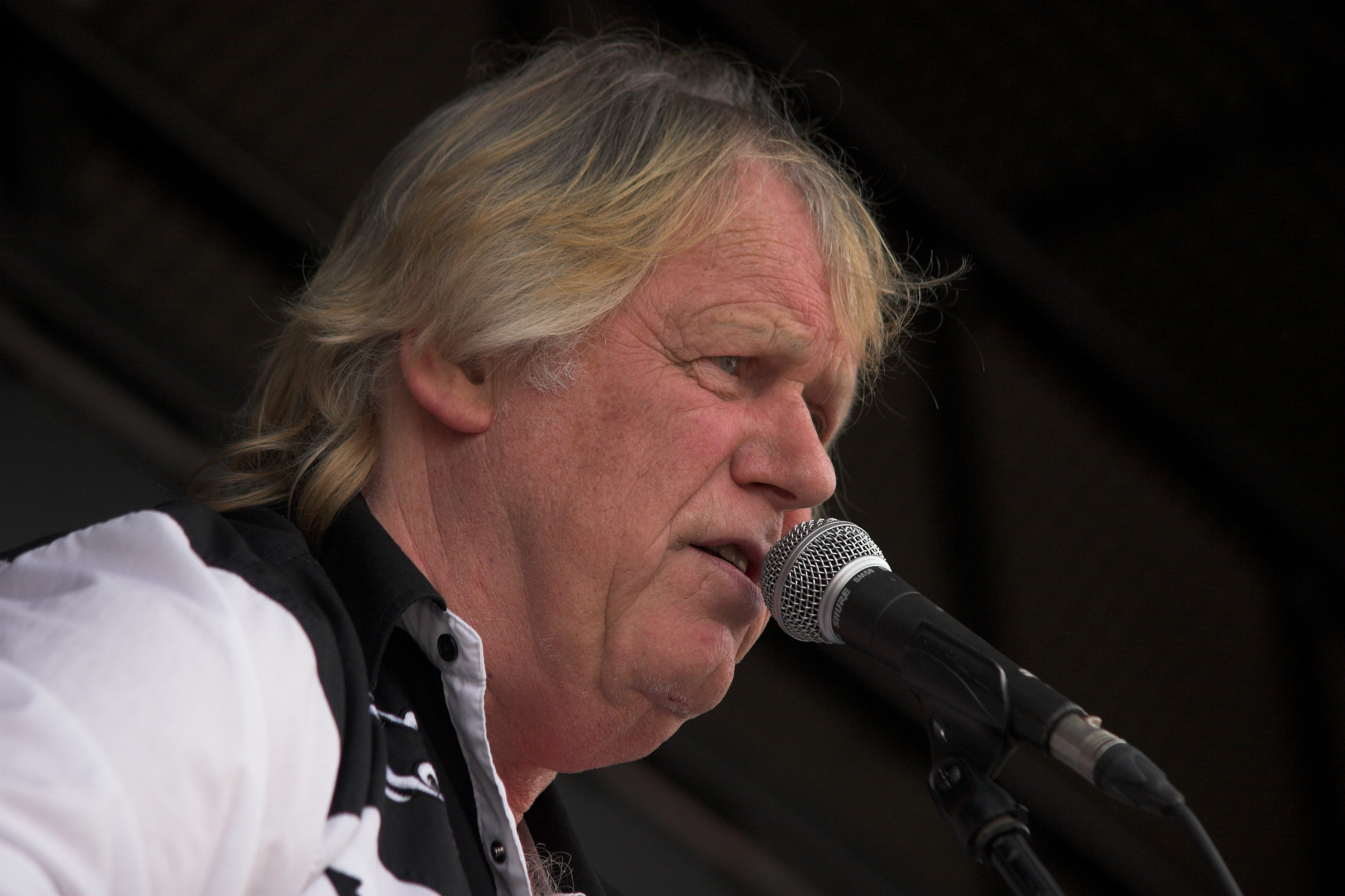
- Gabriel in 2008

Background information
- Also known as: Gunter Gabriel
- Born: Günter Caspelherr; 11 June 1942; Bünde, Germany
- Died: 22 June 2017 (aged 75)
- Genre: Schlager
- Instruments: Vocals, guitar

Gunter Gabriel (born Günter Caspelherr; 11 June 1942 – 22 June 2017) was a German singer, musician and composer. Gabriel became famous in Germany as a singer of Schlager songs. Gabriel lived in Harburg, Hamburg. He was a friend of Johnny Cash and introduced American Country music to German audiences, even covering some of Cash's songs in German.

== Background and education ==
Günter Caspelherr, later known as Gunter Gabriel, grew up with his younger sister in Bünde and Kirchlengern. His mother hanged herself when he was four, after his father had pressured her to have an abortion with a knitting needle. when Caspelherr was four. His father remarried after a year, and often beat his son.

He dropped out of elementary school early to get a job, working at various positions in different countries of Central Europe. He eventually obtained his vocational high school diploma and studied mechanical engineering at the Hanover University of Applied Sciences, but dropped out of his studies. He then devoted himself entirely to music, working as a DJ and eventually becoming a promoter at a record company. This brought him into contact with various artists for whom he began to write songs.

== Musical career ==
After Gunter Gabriel composed his first song for Norman Ascot in 1970, he came up with an album in December 1973 with the "track-driven" song "Er ist ein Kerl (der 30 Tonner Diesel)" his first hit. It got the Golden Europe and paved the way for German-language hits in the country music style with artists such as Truck Stop, Tom Astor, or Linda Feller.

In the mid-1970s, Gabriel began working with Juliane Werding, writing for her the songs "Wenn du denkst, du denkst, dann denkst du nur, du denkst", "Wer nichts mehr zu verlieren hat", "Man muß das Leben eben nehmen wie das Leben eben ist" and "Meine alte Stadt". In 1976, the song "...and therefore Mr. Judge" was released, about a broken couple who have to justify their divorce to the judge. Gabriel again acted as the author for this song and sang the piece with Werding as a duet for their fourth studio album "Oh Man, oh Mann...".

In 2003, at Johnny Cash's studio in Hendersonville, Tennessee, he recorded an album of Cash songs in German, "Gabriel Sings Cash - The Tennessee Project", which was produced by Cash's son John Carter Cash. Already suffering from a serious illness, shortly before his death Cash contributed a spoken intro which appeared on Liebe, Autos, Abenteuer—a tribute album to Cash featuring 54 artists performing in a wide variety of musical genres. Gabriel's 2009 album Sohn aus dem Volk was another tribute to Cash and is subtitled "German Recordings", a counterpart to Cash's "American Recordings". The album was a turning point in Gabriel's career, as well as his Living Room Tour, which he began in 2007 and played for anyone who asked for an initial fee of €1,000. It was discussed in press, praising his ability to overcome his economic difficulties. Posthumously, Gabriel's daughter Yvonne released the album Denkmal in February 2023, which contains several unreleased tracks by Gabriel, some of which his daughter had expanded with her own lyrics and arrangements. Denkmal placed at number 92 of the GfK Entertainment charts.

== Other activities ==
In August and September 2010, Gabriel played his first major theatrical role as the title character in the stage play "Hello, I'm Johnny Cash" (director and writer: Volker Kühn), alongside the singer Helen Schneider, who took over the role of Cash's wife June Carter Cash. Gunter Gabriel was the narrator of the TV show Asphalt Cowboys on DMAX. In January 2016, he was a contestant on the show Ich bin ein Star – Holt mich hier raus!, from which he left prematurely at his own request after five days.

== Personal life ==
At the height of his success in the 1970s, Gabriel lived in a 10-room old apartment on Katharinenstraße in Berlin Charlottenburg-Wilmersdorf.

In the mid-1980s, economic ruin followed for him. He had lost millions in real estate investments, his marriages failed, and professional successes did not materialize.

Gabriel was married four times and had four children. He fell down a flight of stairs a couple of days before his death and died of complications that occurred after multiple surgeries to fix his broken neck, eleven days before he would havet turned 76.

== Books ==
- 2009: Gunter Gabriel, Oliver Flesch: Wer einmal tief im Keller saß. Erinnerungen eines Rebellen. Edel, Hamburg 2009, ISBN 978-3-941378-17-9.
