= Sunderbach (Else) =

River in Germany

Location
- Country: Germany
- State: North Rhine-Westphalia

Physical characteristics
- Mouth
  - location: Else
  - coordinates: 52.1936°N 8.5703°E

Basin features
- Progression: Else→ Werre→ Weser→ North Sea

Sunderbach is a small river of North Rhine-Westphalia, Germany. It is 2.5 km (1.6 mi) long and is a left tributary of the Else, which in turn is tributary of the Werre.

== See also ==
- List of rivers of North Rhine-Westphalia
