= Werfener Bach =

River in North Rhine-Westphalia, Germany

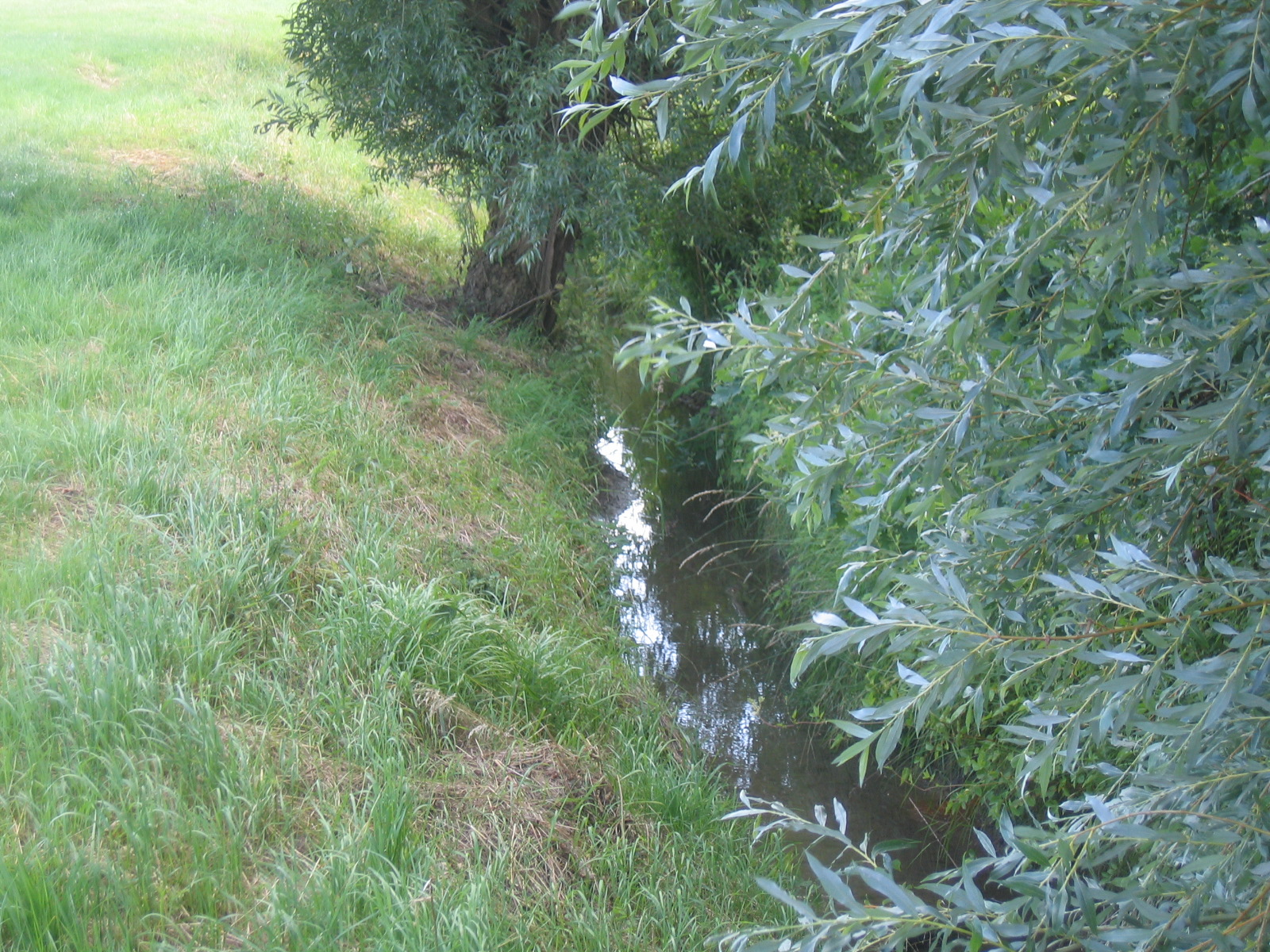

Location
- Country: Germany
- State: North Rhine-Westphalia

Physical characteristics
- Mouth
  - location: Else
  - coordinates: 52.1859°N 8.5641°E

Basin features
- Progression: Else→ Werre→ Weser→ North Sea

Werfener Bach is a small river of North Rhine-Westphalia, Germany. It is 4.8 km (3.0 mi) long and is a right tributary of the Else near Bünde.

== See also ==
- List of rivers of North Rhine-Westphalia
