= Sunderbach (Trüggelbach) =

River in Bielefeld, Germany

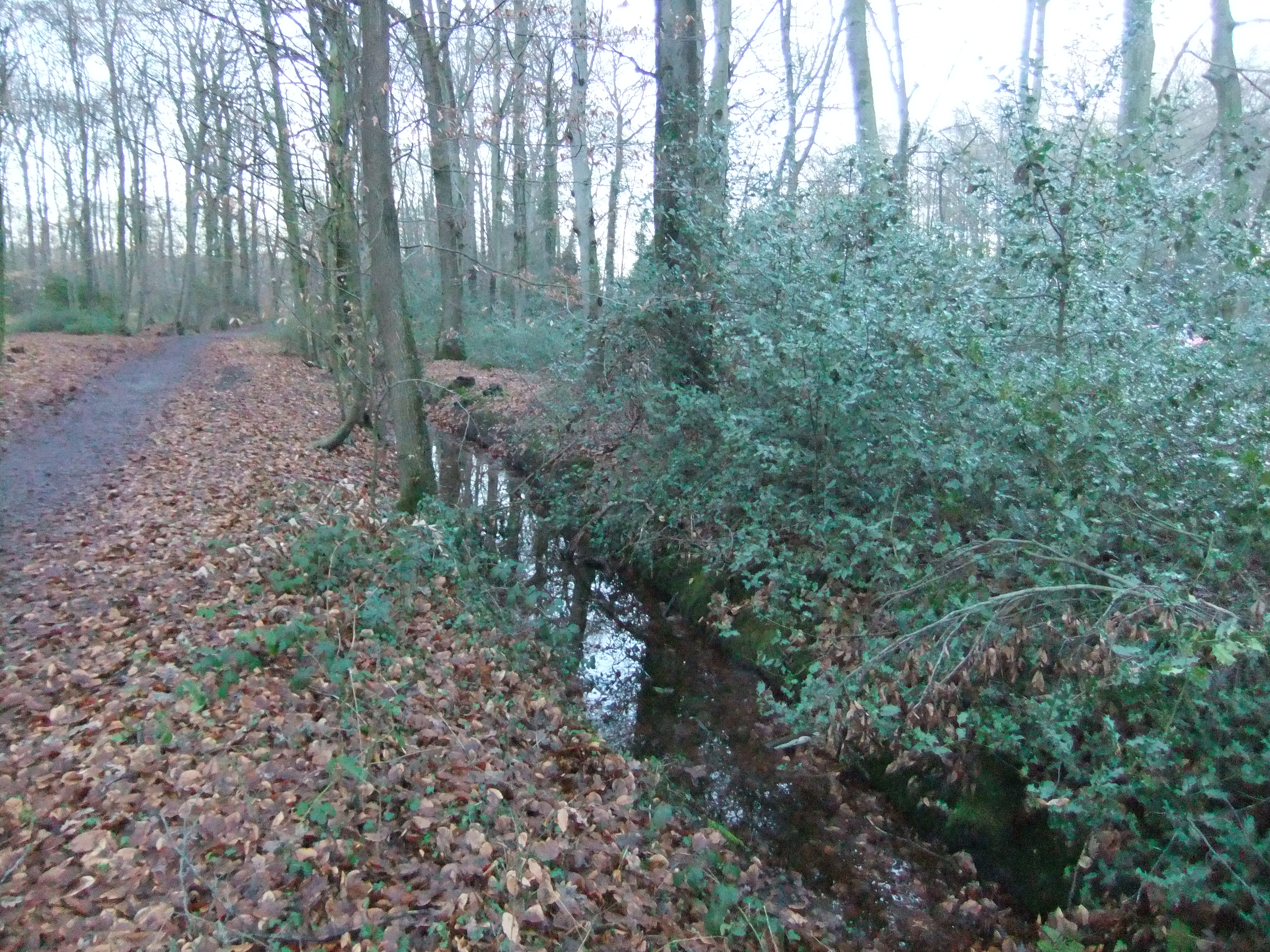

Location
- Country: Germany
- State: North Rhine-Westphalia

Physical characteristics
- Mouth
  - location: Trüggelbach
  - coordinates: 51.9686°N 8.4689°E

Basin features
- Progression: Trüggelbach→ Lutter→ Ems→ North Sea

Sunderbach is a small river of North Rhine-Westphalia, Germany. It is 2.7 km (1.7 mi) long and is a right tributary of the Trüggelbach. It is one of eight rivers and streams in North Rhine-Westphalia officially recorded under the name Sunderbach.

== See also ==
- List of rivers of North Rhine-Westphalia
