= Gewinghauser Bach =

River in Germany

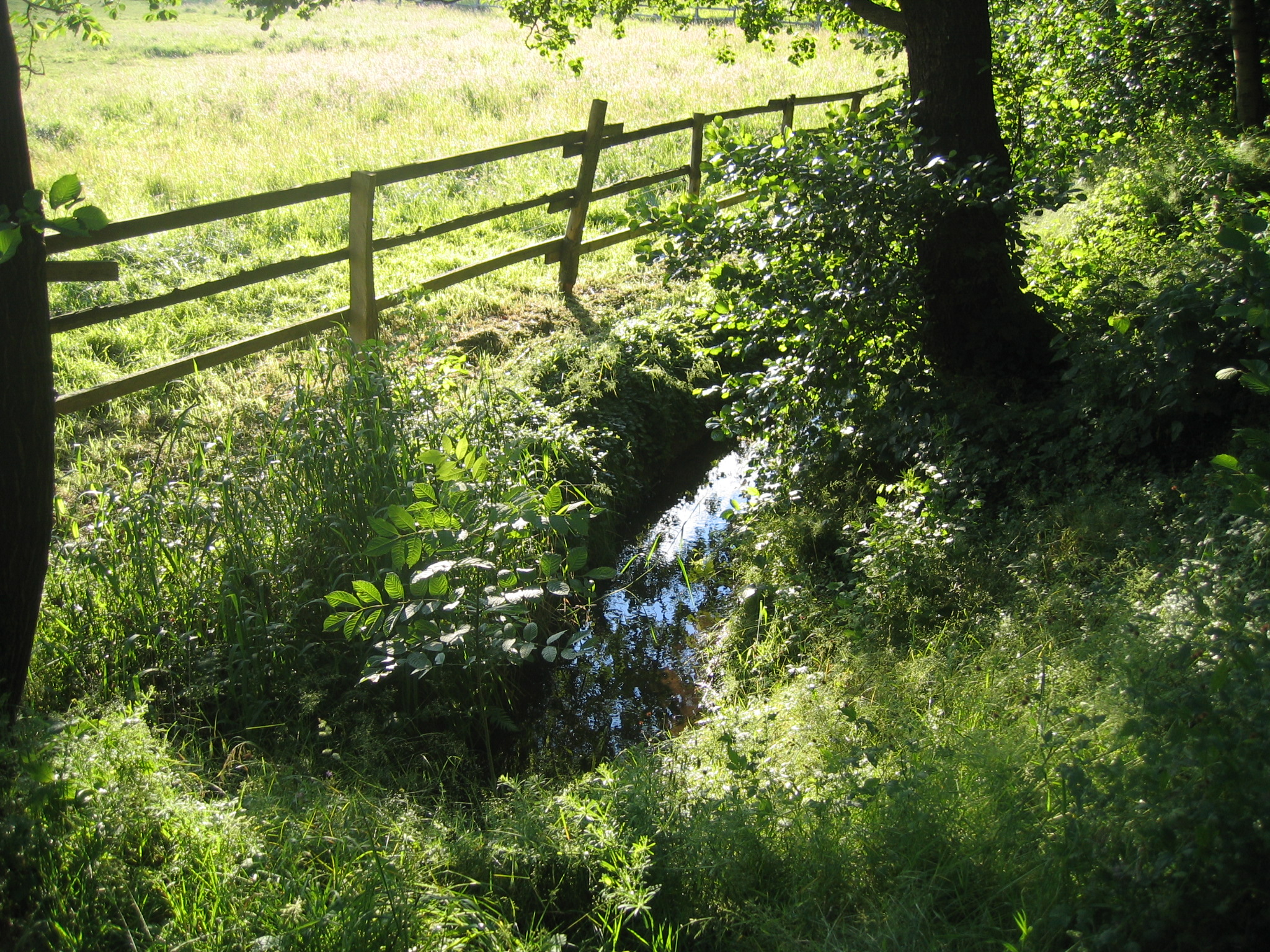

Location
- Country: Germany
- States: North Rhine-Westphalia

Physical characteristics
- Mouth
  - location: Else
  - coordinates: 52.2042°N 8.5853°E

Basin features
- Progression: Else→ Werre→ Weser→ North Sea

Gewinghauser Bach is a river of North Rhine-Westphalia, Germany, and is also known as the Landwehrbach. It is 8.2 km long and flows into the Else in Bünde.

== See also ==
- List of rivers of North Rhine-Westphalia
