= Eselsbach (Else) =

River in Germany

Location
- Country: Germany
- State: North Rhine-Westphalia

Physical characteristics
- Mouth
  - location: Else
  - coordinates: 52.2002°N 8.6069°E
- Length: 3.1 km (1.9 mi)

Basin features
- Progression: Else→ Werre→ Weser→ North Sea

Eselsbach is a river of North Rhine-Westphalia, Germany. It is a left tributary of the Else.

== See also ==
- List of rivers of North Rhine-Westphalia
