= Ostbach (Else) =

River in Germany

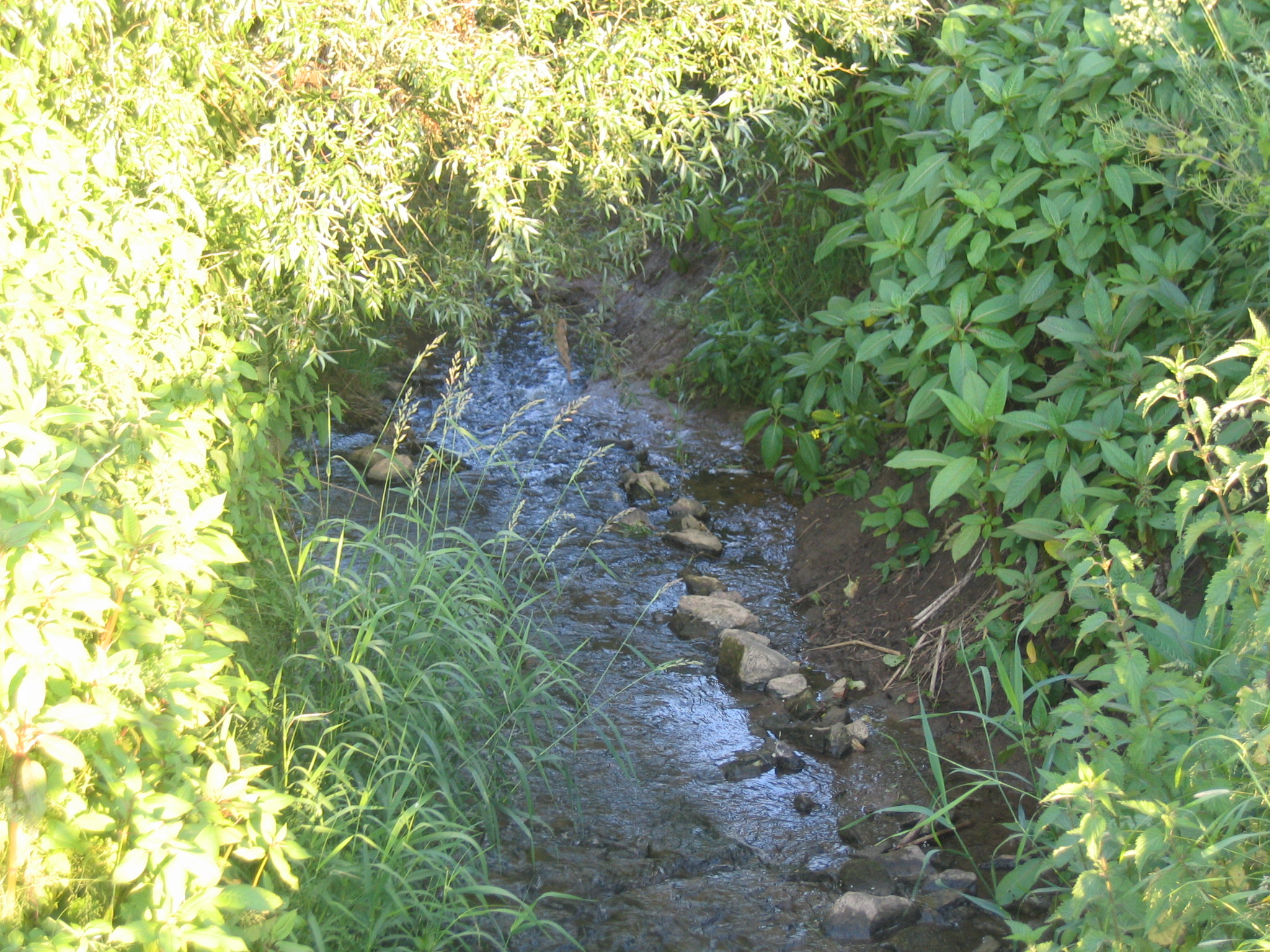

Location
- Country: Germany
- State: North Rhine-Westphalia

Physical characteristics
- Source
  - coordinates: 52° 15′ 48″ N, 8° 34′ 15″ E
  - elevation: approx. 193 m.a.s.l.
- Mouth
  - location: Else
  - coordinates: 52° 11′ 59.23″ N, 8° 36′ 6.67″ E
- Length: 10.2 km (6.3 mi)

Basin features
- Progression: Else→ Werre→ Weser→ North Sea

Ostbach is a river of North Rhine-Westphalia, Germany. It is a left tributary of the Else in Bünde.

== See also ==
- List of rivers of North Rhine-Westphalia
