= Ostbach (Emscher) =

River in Germany

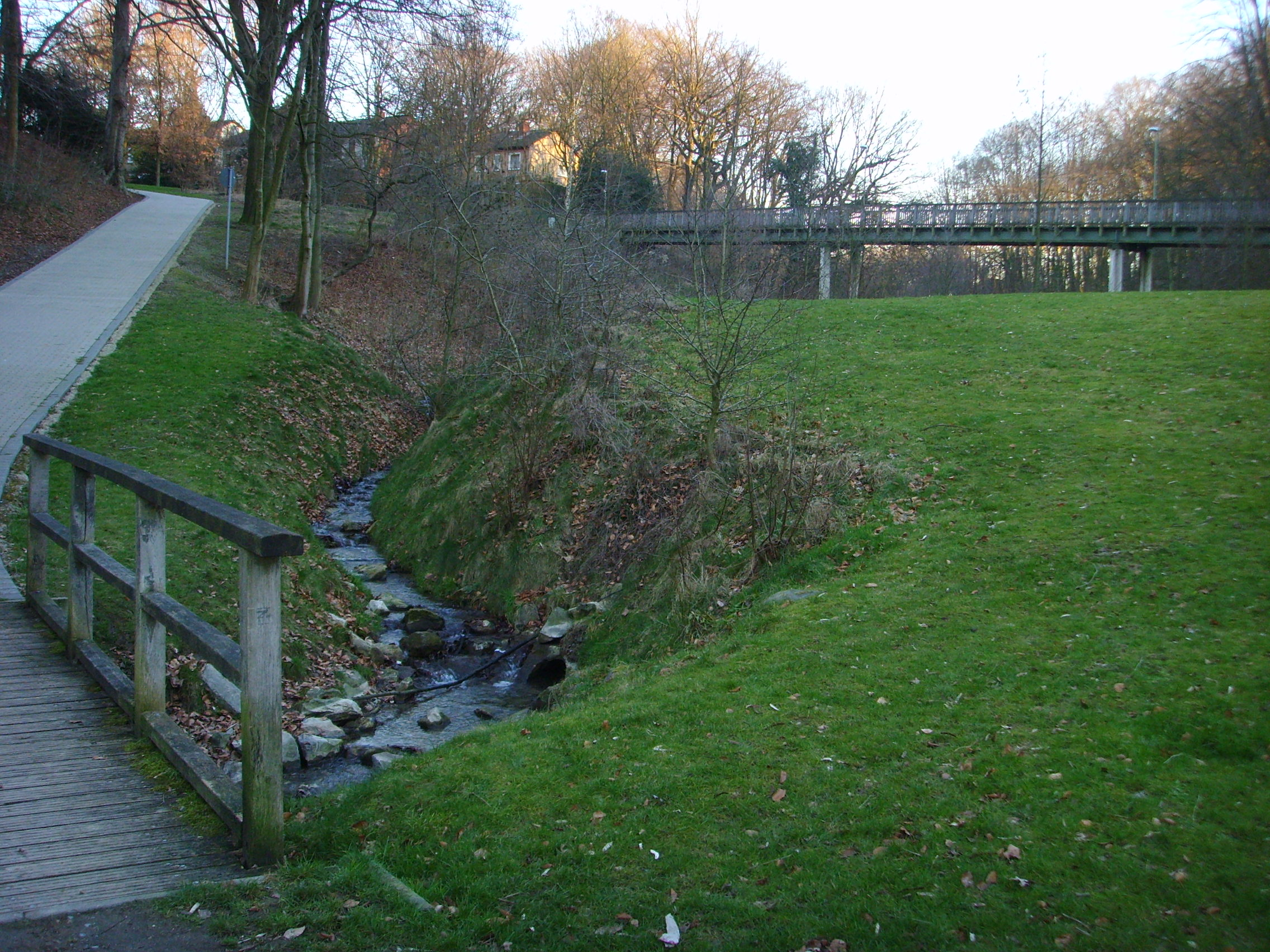

Location
- Country: Germany
- State: North Rhine-Westphalia

Physical characteristics
- Mouth
  - location: Emscher
  - coordinates: 51.5578°N 7.1996°E
- Length: 7.1 km (4.4 mi)

Basin features
- Progression: Emscher→ Rhine→ North Sea

Ostbach is a river of North Rhine-Westphalia, Germany. It is a left tributary of the Emscher near Herne.

== See also ==
- List of rivers of North Rhine-Westphalia
