= Darmühlenbach =

River in Germany

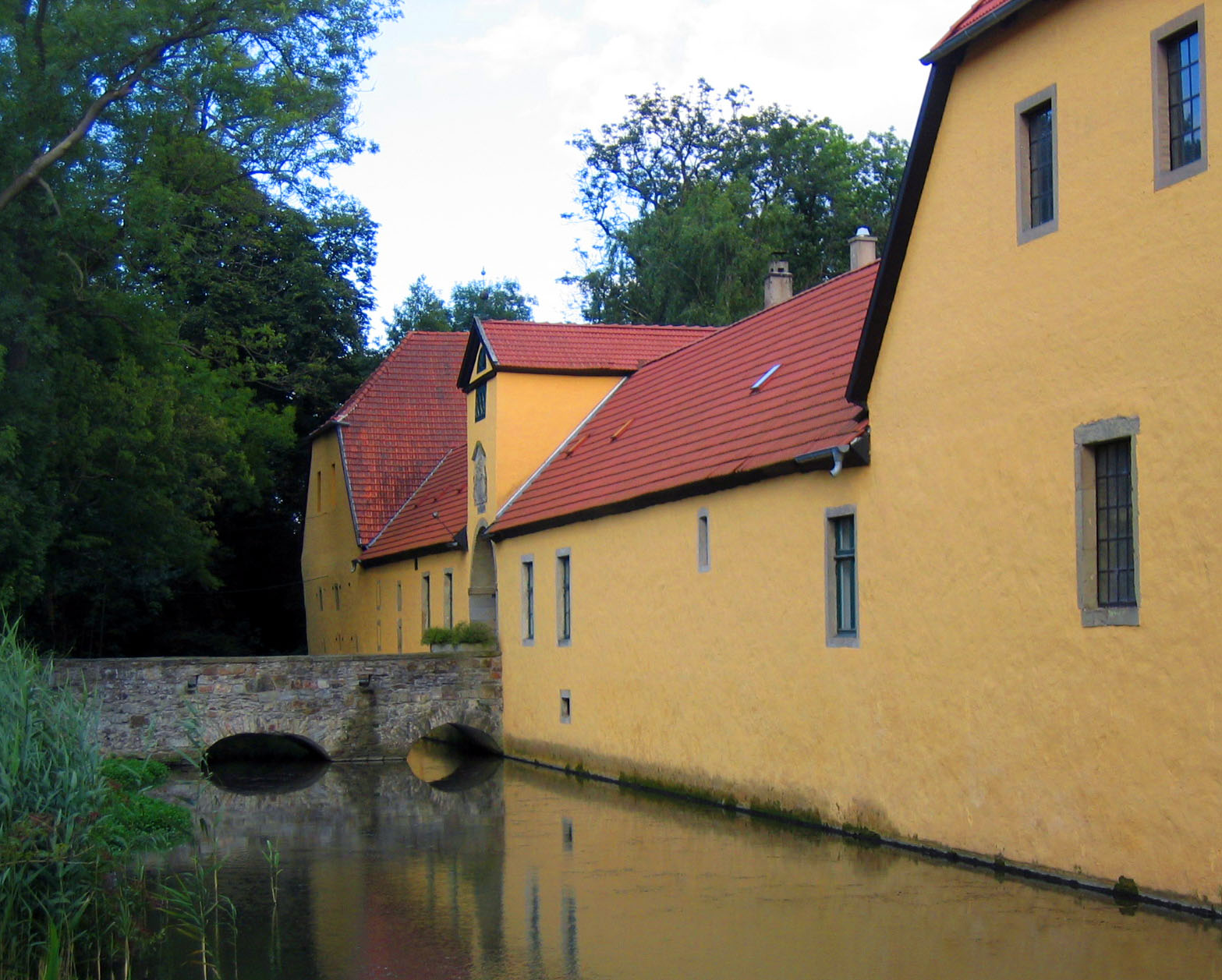

Location
- Country: Germany
- State: North Rhine-Westphalia

Physical characteristics
- Mouth
  - location: Else
  - coordinates: 52.1931°N 8.5511°E

Basin features
- Progression: Else→ Werre→ Weser→ North Sea

Darmühlenbach is a river of North Rhine-Westphalia, Germany. It is 7.8 km long and flows into the Else near Bünde.

== See also ==
- List of rivers of North Rhine-Westphalia
