= Trüggelbach =

River in Germany

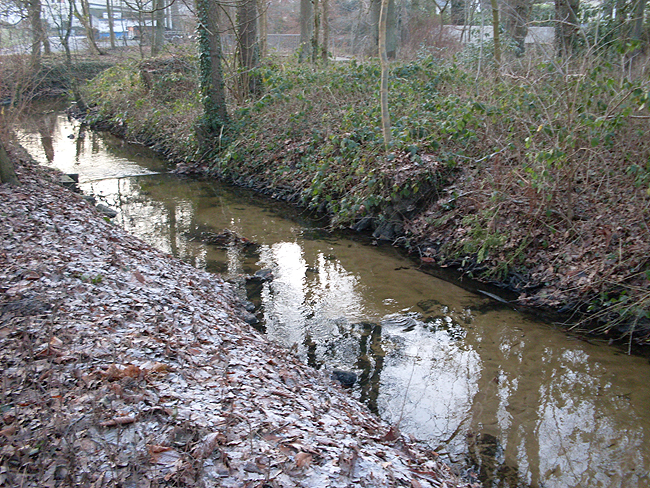

Location
- Country: Germany
- State: North Rhine-Westphalia

Physical characteristics
- Source
  - coordinates: 51°58′20″N 8°30′10″E
- Mouth
  - location: Lutter
  - coordinates: 51.9618°N 8.4415°E

Basin features
- Progression: Lutter→ Ems→ North Sea

Trüggelbach is a small river of North Rhine-Westphalia, Germany. It is 5.4 km (3.4 mi) long and flows as a left tributary into the Lutter near Gütersloh.

== See also ==
- List of rivers of North Rhine-Westphalia
