= Else (Werre) =

River in Germany

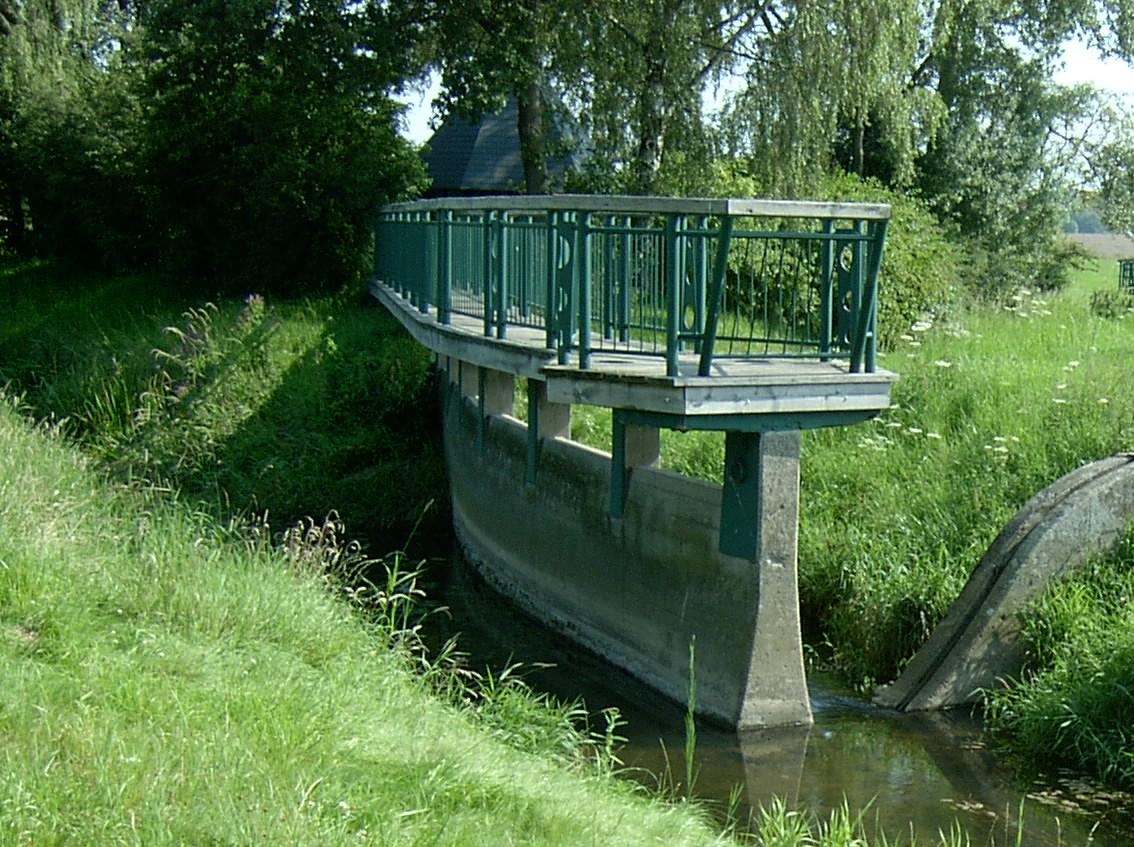
- The bifurcation near Melle: the Else is on the right and the Hase on the left.

Location
- Country: Germany
- States: North Rhine-Westphalia and Lower Saxony
- Reference no.: DE: 466

Physical characteristics
- Source
  - location: Origin: Bifurcation from the Hase near Melle
  - coordinates: 52°12′16″N 8°15′22″E
  - elevation: ca. 79.9 m above sea level (NN)
- Mouth
  - location: Near Kirchlengern/Löhne into the Werre
  - coordinates: 52°11′56″N 8°40′42″E
  - elevation: ca. 52 m above sea level (NN)
- Length: 31.5 km (19.6 mi)
- Basin size: 415.5 km^{2} (160.4 sq mi)

Basin features
- Progression: Werre→ Weser→ North Sea
- Landmarks: Large towns: Melle, Bünde, Löhne; Villages: Rödinghausen, Kirchlengern
- Population: 100000
- Tributaries
  - left: Oldendorfer Mühlenbach, Zwickenbach, Eickener Mühlenbach, Suttbach, Kilverbach, Bennier Graben, Ahler Bruchgraben, Darmühlenbach, Gewinghauser Bach, Knollerbach, Ostbach (Mühlenbach), Eselsbach, Markbach, Sunderbach
  - right: Strotbach, Laerbach, Maschgraben, Violenbach, Bruchriede, Mühlenbach, Alte Else, Warmenau, Neue Else with Werfener Bach, Brandbach (Bolldammbach)

The Else (German pronunciation: [ˈɛlzə]) is a left tributary of the river Werre in the northeast of North Rhine-Westphalia and in southern Lower Saxony. The Else is a distributary of the river Hase and begins at a river bifurcation near Melle.

== Origin ==
The River Else does not have a source but originates at a hydrological phenomenon known as a river bifurcation. The bifurcation is near Gesmold (part of the borough of Melle) in Lower Saxony, where the river Else branches off the river Hase (at Hase river kilometre 158.9). The bifurcation may have been created or established artificially; or at least maintained artificially. This is however unclear. In history there were disputes over the distribution of water that was able to be controlled by man-made means. For example, the entire water flow could be diverted either into the River Hase or River Werre during conflicts. Today the Hase loses a third of its water mass at the bifurcation. The Hase flows northwest to the Ems, while the Else flows east to the Weser.

== Course ==
The River Else flows slowly through the Ravensberg Hills and through the wetlands known as the Else meadows (Elseauen). The Else and Werre valleys, which were formed during the ice age, are bordered in the south by the Teutoburg Forest and in the north by the ridge of the Wiehen Hills. After the bifurcation in Melle the river flows east into North Rhine-Westphalia, passing the state border at river kilometre 19.2 and crossing Rödinghausen and Bünde, before discharging, after a distance of approximately 35 km, into the Werre near the eastern edge of Kirchlengern. The Werre swings east at its mouth by almost 90°, thus aligning itself with the west-to-eastern course of the Else. The River Else passes under the A 30 federal motorway three times (at Gesmold (km 33), at Bruchmühlen (km 22) and at Bünde (km 15). The Else Valley Bridge crosses the river at Kirchlengern. The Else is dammed several times along its length. A particularly large number of weirs is located on the lower reaches between Bünde and its mouth; the Else's velocity here is controlled over a short distance by 4 weirs.

== Tributaries ==
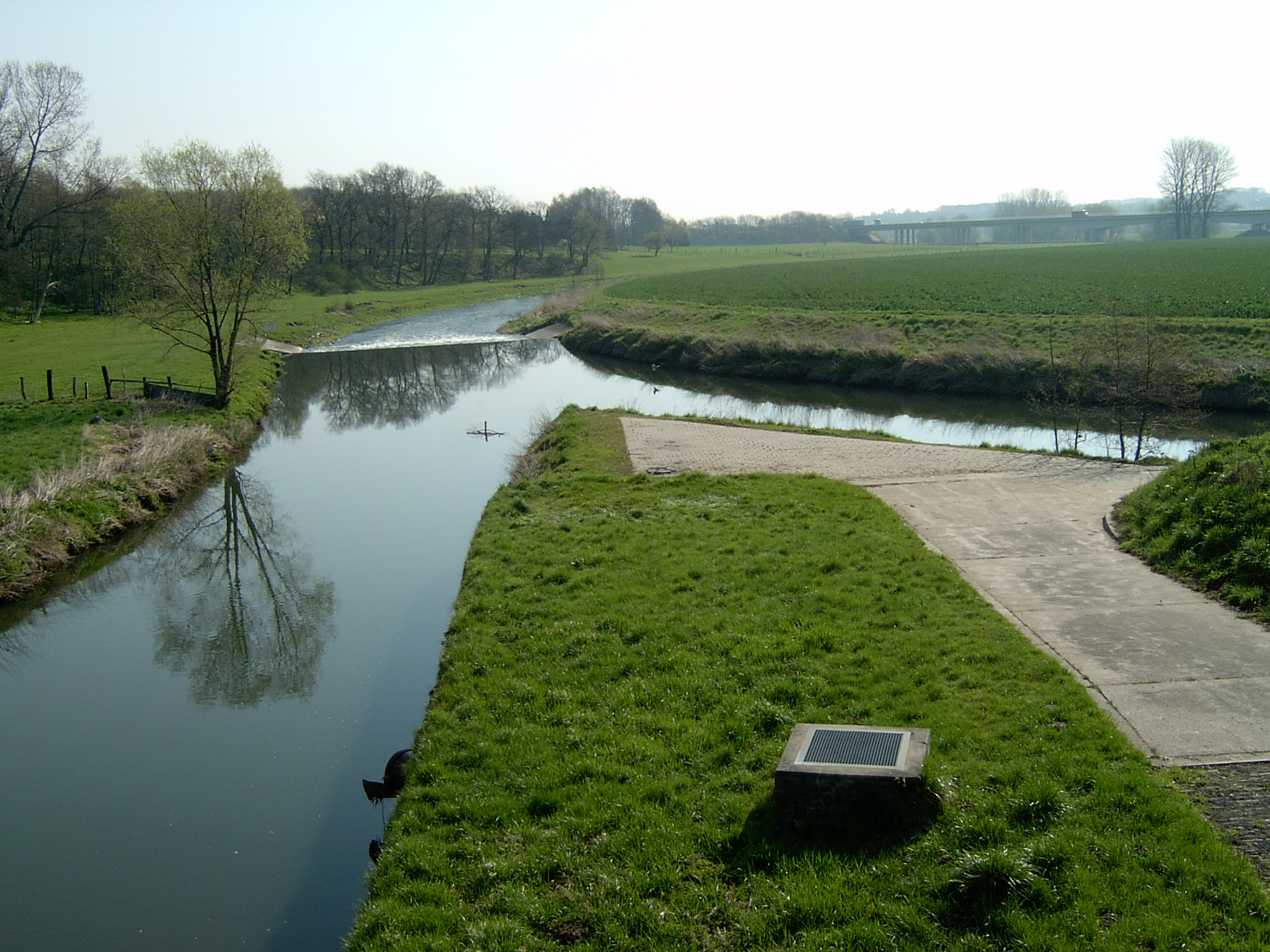
Delta of River Else in River Werre

Designated tributaries, which flow into river Else or the parallel led river Neue Else are (from bifurcation to mouth):

- Oldendorfer Mühlenbach (L 31,1)
- Strotbach (R 29,5)
- Laerbach (R 29)
- Zwickenbach (L 29)
- Maschgraben (R 25,9)
- Eickener Mühlenbach (L 24,5)
- Violen Bach (R 24)
- Bruchriede (R 22,1)
- Suttbach (L 21,5)
- Kilverbach (L 19,5)
- Mühlenbach (R 18,4)
- Bennier Graben (L, 18,2)
- Alte Else (R, 17,1)
- Ahler Bruchgraben (L 16,2)
- Warmenau (R 15,3)
- Darmühlenbach (L 12)
- Sunderbach (L 10,5)
- Neue Else (R, 10)
- Gewinghauser Bach (L 8,8)
- Knollerbach (L 8,3)
- Ostbach (Mühlenbach) (L, 7,3)
- Eselsbach (L 6,7)
- Markbach (L 4,4)
- Brandbach (Bolldammbach) (R, 3,7)

(L/R; KM): Left right supply, with river kilometer, delta with km 0)

== Watershed ==
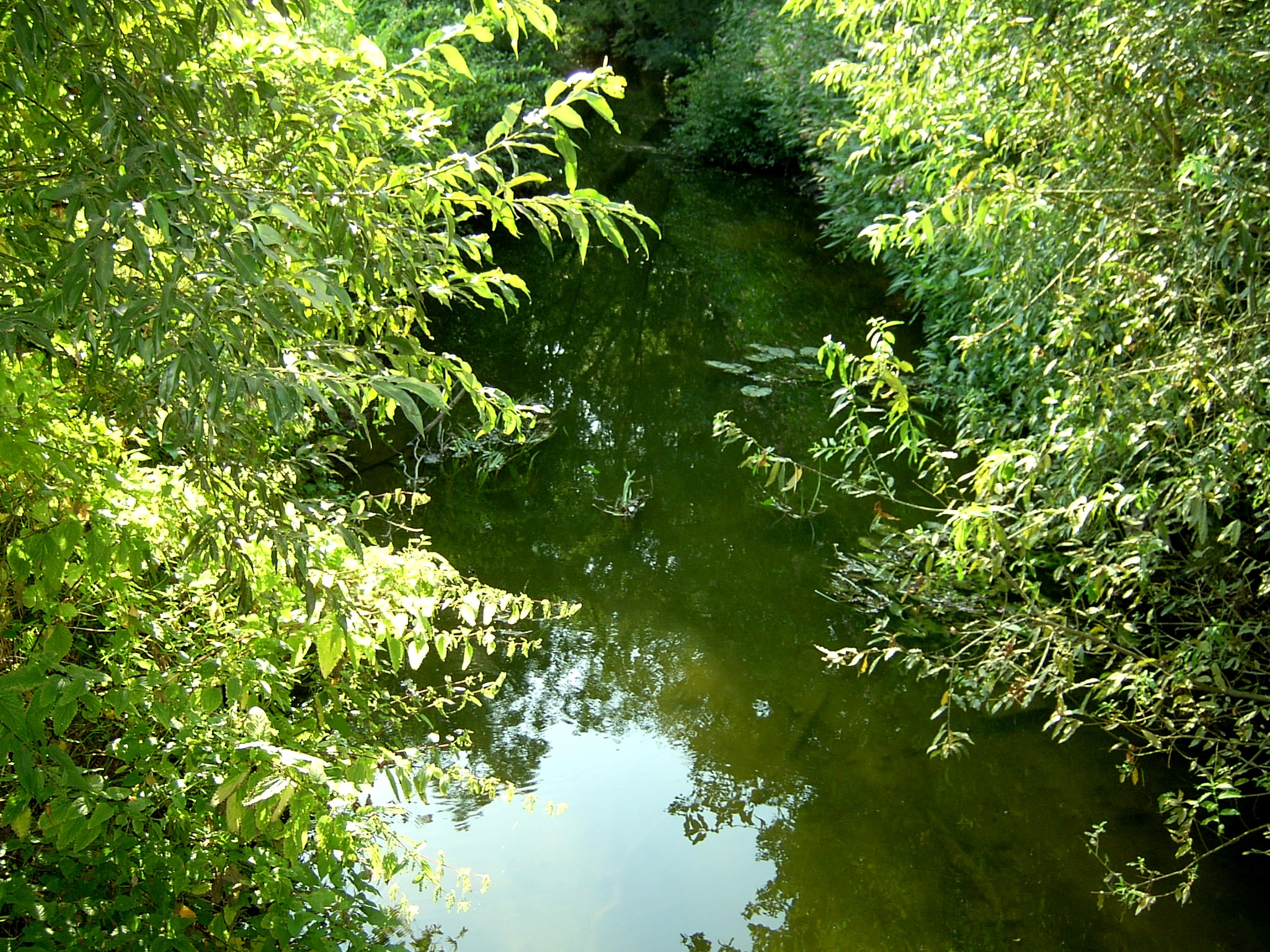
Distributary Neue Else near Bünde

The watershed of river Else has a size of 414,6 km². In the watershed approximately live 100,000 people.

The following municipalities lie at river Else:

- Melle
- Rödinghausen
- Bünde
- Kirchlengern
- Löhne

In addition to the watershed lie totally or partly:

- Spenge
- Enger
- Hiddenhausen
- Werther
- Borgholzhausen

== Nature reserve ==
On the North-Rhine/Westphalian side there are two adjacent nature reserves with the same name of Elseaue ("Else water meadows") with a total area of 117 hectares (290 acres). The reserves were established in 1994 and 1995. The area lies north of the Else and south of the railway line from Löhne to Osnabrück along a 3.5 km long section of the river. The area is protected, because it is a near-natural floodplain in the middle of the intensively farmed Ravensberg Land. On the floodplain, the remnants of former river courses of the Else may be recognized. The floodplain is largely turned over to grassland with flood banks. The steep river banks, up to 3m high, are a haven for the kingfisher.

== Tourism ==
In Bünde there is an association for canoe sports. Due to its good water quality, fishing in always possible in the river. In addition the Else-Werre cycle way on the river continues to lead along and of the delta into the Werre up to the Weser.

== See also ==
- List of rivers of North Rhine-Westphalia
- List of rivers of Lower Saxony
