= Bünde =

- Town
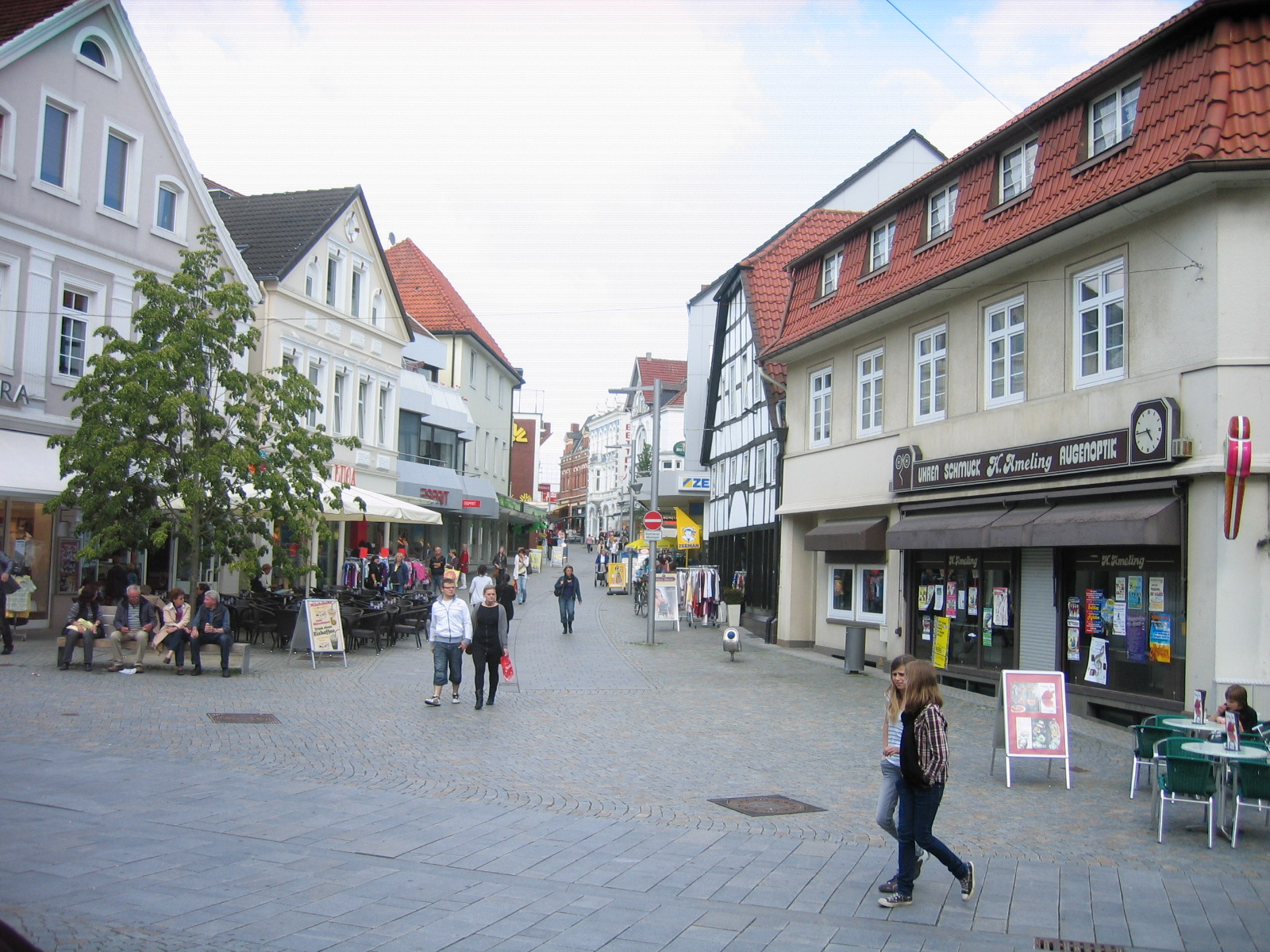

- Flag Coat of arms

- Location of Bünde within Herford district
- Interactive map of Bünde
- Location within Germany Location within North Rhine-Westphalia
- Coordinates: 52°12′N 8°36′E
- Country: Germany
- State: North Rhine-Westphalia
- Admin. region: Detmold
- District: Herford
- Subdivisions: 12

Government
  - Mayor (2020–25): Susanne Rutenkröger (SPD)

Area
  - Total: 59.3 km^{2} (22.9 sq mi)
- Elevation: 59–175 m (194–574 ft)

Population (2025-12-31)
  - Total: 46,235
  - Density: 780/km^{2} (2,020/sq mi)
- Time zone: UTC+01:00 (CET)
  - Summer (DST): UTC+02:00 (CEST)
- Postal codes: 32257
- Dialling codes: 05223
- Vehicle registration: HF
- Website: www.buende.de

Bünde (German pronunciation: [ˈbʏndə]; Low German: Buine) is a town in the Herford district of North Rhine-Westphalia, Germany.

== Geography ==
Bünde is situated between Osnabrück (west), Hanover (east) and Bielefeld (south).

=== Waterways ===
The town is crossed from west to east by the River Else, one of the few rivers in the world that does not originate from a spring, but as a result of bifurcation. It drains the whole area and discharges via the Werre and Weser into the North Sea. Within the town area it is joined by numerous small streams from the south and north. One of the northern streams is the Gewinghauser Bach, which on its way to the Else crosses water meadows in the district of Ennigloh-Gewinghausen. Other tributaries coming from the north in downstream order are the Ahler Bruchbach, which starts in Rödinghausen, flows mainly through the district of Ahler Bruch and enters the Else in the Melle area; in addition there is the Darmühlenbach, which also rises in Rödinghausen; then the Spradower Mühlenbach and finally the Eselsbach. From the south the Else is joined by the Werfener Bach.

=== Districts ===
The town is divided into 12 districts (Population numbers as of June 30, 2005):

- Bünde (city center) (11,163 inhabitants)
- Ennigloh (9,146 inhabitants)
- Spradow (4,832 inhabitants)
- Südlengern (4,610 inhabitants)
- Dünne (4,165 inhabitants)
- Holsen (3,762 inhabitants)
- Hunnebrock (3,329 inhabitants)
- Ahle (2,060 inhabitants)
- Bustedt (1,751 inhabitants)
- Hüffen (1,653 inhabitants)
- Werfen (934 inhabitants)
- Muckum (853 inhabitants)

== History ==
Bünde was first mentioned, as Buginithi, in 853. It has one of the oldest church foundations of Westphalia, the Laurentius Church (founded about 778–840). During the Cold War, it was home to a British military base (part of the BAOR) which closed in 1993.

== Population ==
Historical population

Year	Pop.	±% p.a.
1965	39,994	—
1970	40,403	+0.20%
1975	40,007	−0.20%
1980	40,058	+0.03%
1985	38,593	−0.74%
1990	40,524	+0.98%
1995	43,186	+1.28%

Year	Pop.	±% p.a.
2000	44,582	+0.64%
2005	45,114	+0.24%
2010	44,786	−0.15%
2015	45,615	+0.37%
2020	45,376	−0.11%
2025	46,235	+0.38%

Source: Landesdatabank Nordrhein-Westfalen

== Coat of arms ==
The two warriors shaking hands on the city's coat of arms are Hengist and Horsa, Saxon princes said to have led the Germanic conquest of southern Britain in the 5th century. Legend holds that it was here the brother warriors put aside their differences and swore to conquer the island together, a fact commemorated in the town's name (Bund, plural Bünde, means "league" or "covenant" in German).

== Natural history ==
About 30 million-year-old fossils were found in the Doberg, including a skull of a toothed whale (Eosqualodon langewieschei) and a skeleton of a manatee (Anemotherium langewieschei). Both were found in 1911–1912 by Friedrich Langewiesche, who became an honorary citizen of Bünde. The fossils are presented in 'Doberg Museum' in Bünde.

== Economy ==
The main industries are kitchen furniture and cigar manufacturers. The town is called the Cigar Box of Germany. Many tobacco products such as pipes, and tobacco jars are also produced here. The Westphalian tobacco industry is based here, as well as the tobacco museums. Among companies based in the town, the model maker Revell is known on the international stage. The European arm has been based here since 1957.

== Culture ==
The town supports the Nordwestdeutsche Philharmonie for regular symphony concerts.

== Twin towns – sister cities ==
Bünde is twinned with:

- Jakobstad, Finland (1968)
- Leisnig, Germany (1990)

== Notable people ==
- Carl Vandyk (1851–1931), Court photographer and founder of Vandyk, Rembrandt and Rubens Hotels, London
- Gunter Gabriel (1942–2017), singer and lyricist
- Ulrich Horstmann (born 1949), literary scientist and writer
- Christian Sewing (born 1970), banker
- Aylin Tezel (born 1983), actress and dancer
- David Odonkor (born 1984), footballer
- Pascal Stenzel (born 1996), footballer

=== Associated with the town ===
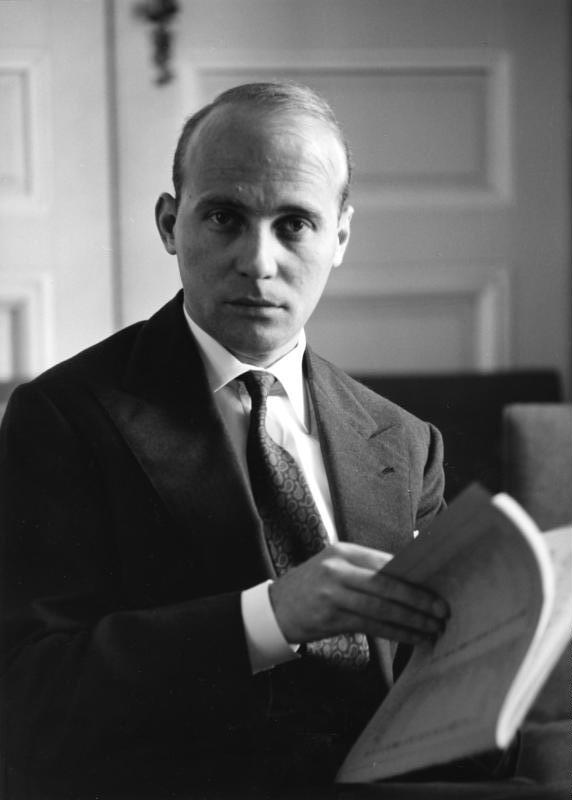
Hans Werner Henze 1960

- Hengest and Horsa, according to the legend, these two Saxon tribe leaders and brethren (whose historicity is very controversial) forged the alliance in England
- Karl Koch (1875–1951), theologian, pastor in Ennigloh
- Hans Werner Henze (1926–2012), composer, spent some years of his childhood in the Bünder district of Dünne
- Fritz Pleitgen (1938–2022), journalist, visited the Freiherr-vom-Stein-Gymnasium here and worked during this time for the then Freie Presse as a sports reporter
- C. C. Catch (born 1964), musician, lived in Bünde and attended school
- Maximilian Hecker (born 1977), musician, lived in Bünde and did his Abitur at the Freiherr-vom-Stein-Gymnasium

== Gallery ==
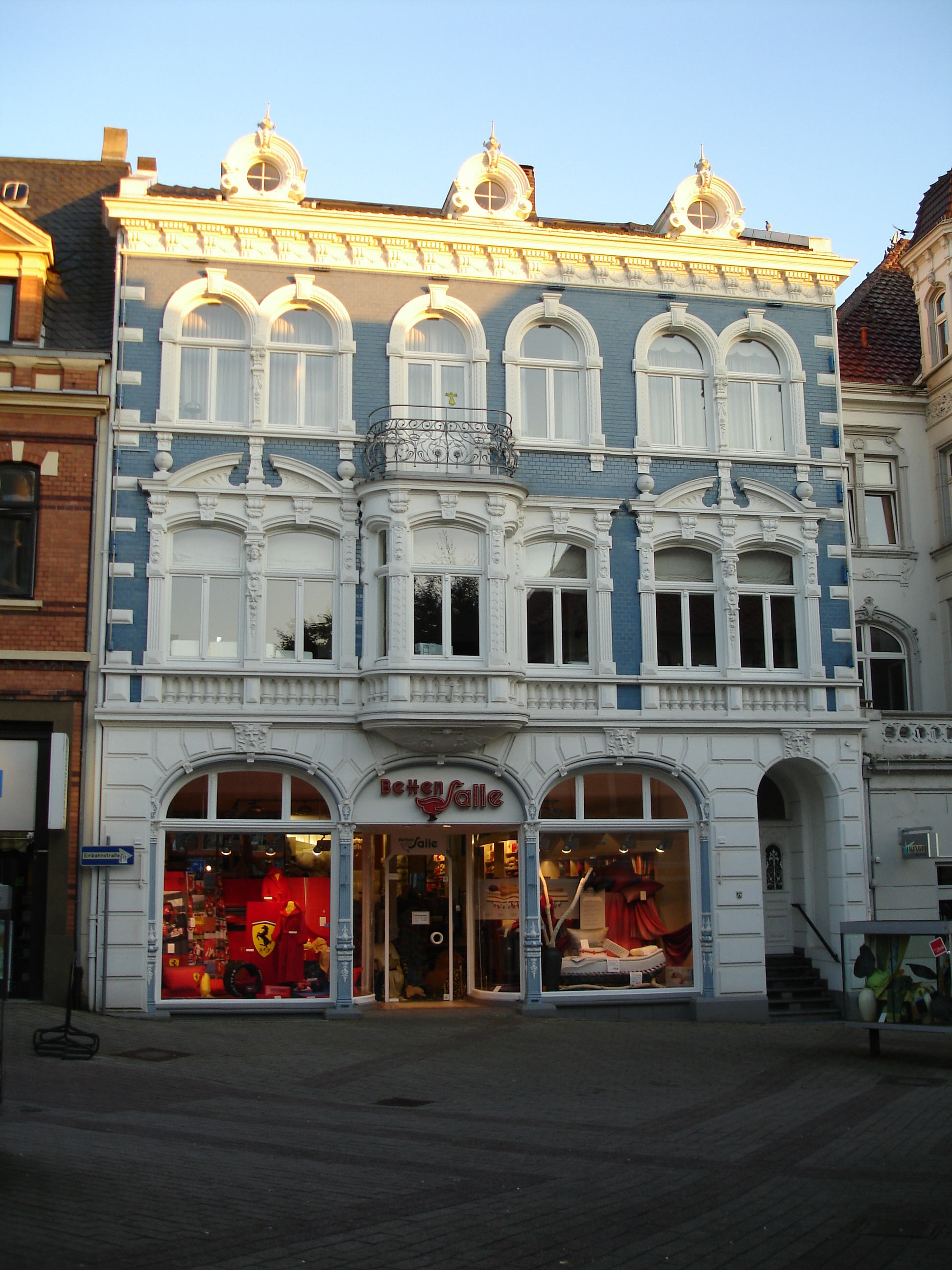
In Downtown Bünde

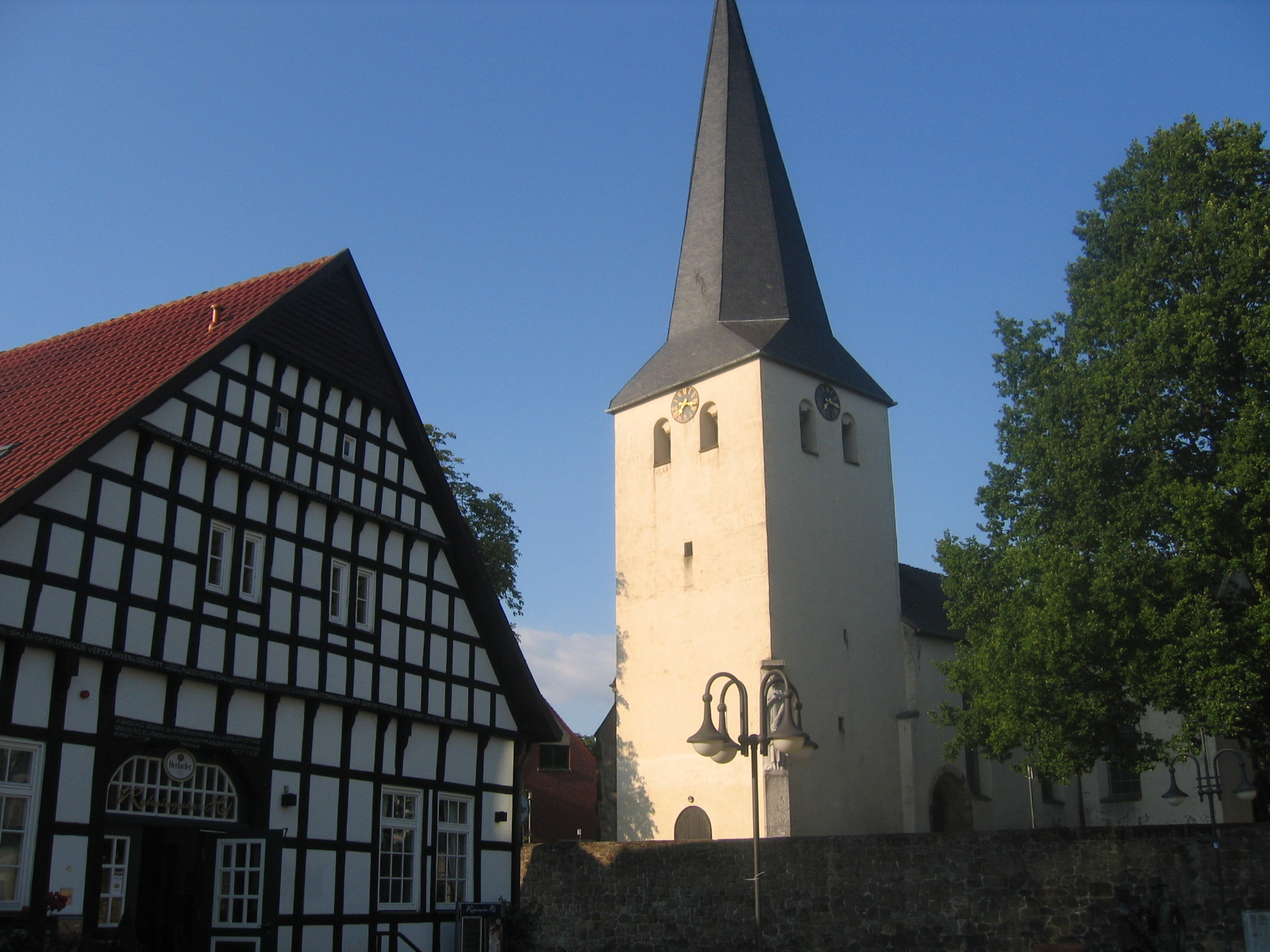
Lutheran Church of St. Laurentius

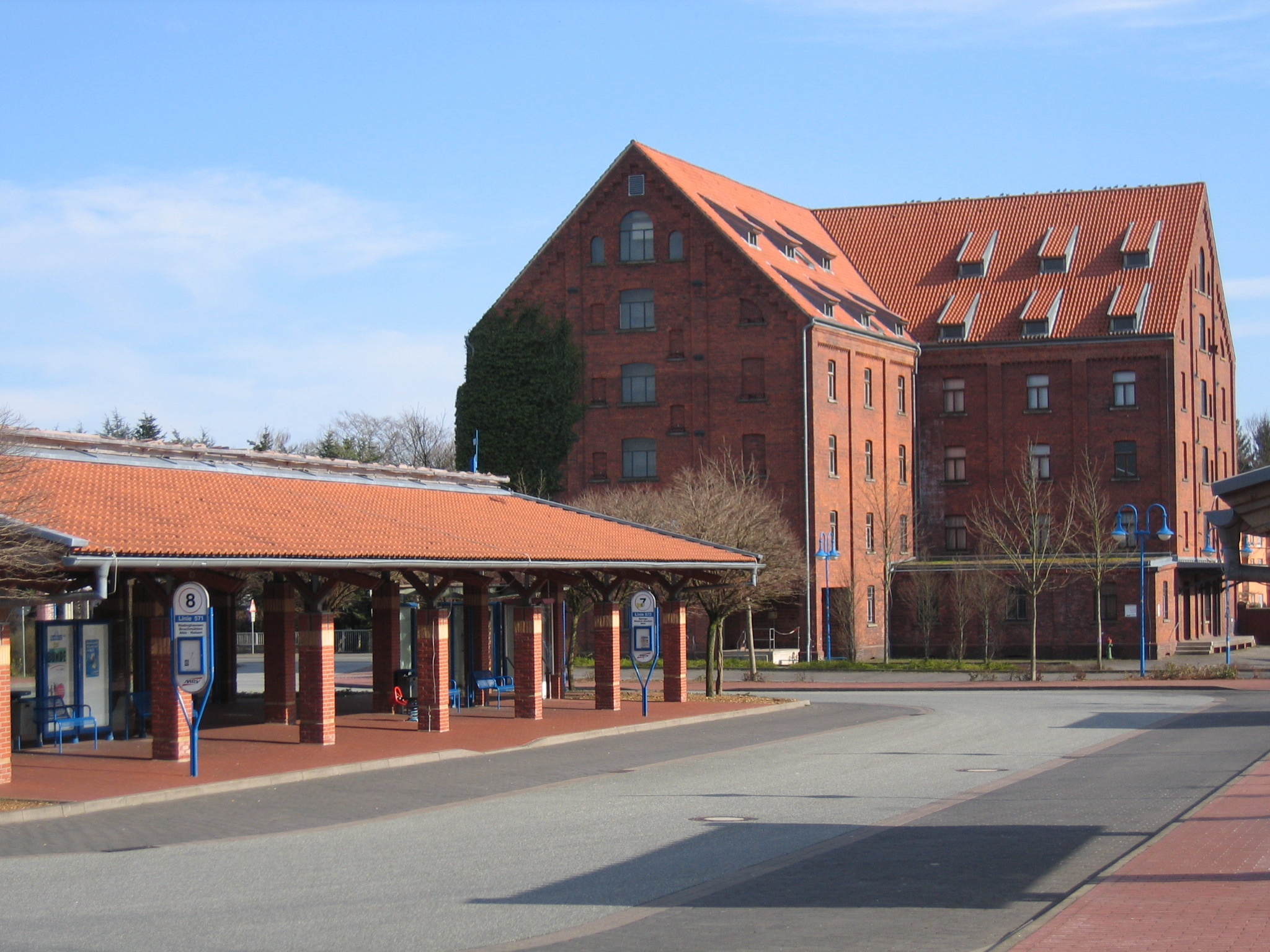
tobacco storehouse (Tabakspeicher) and Central Bus station

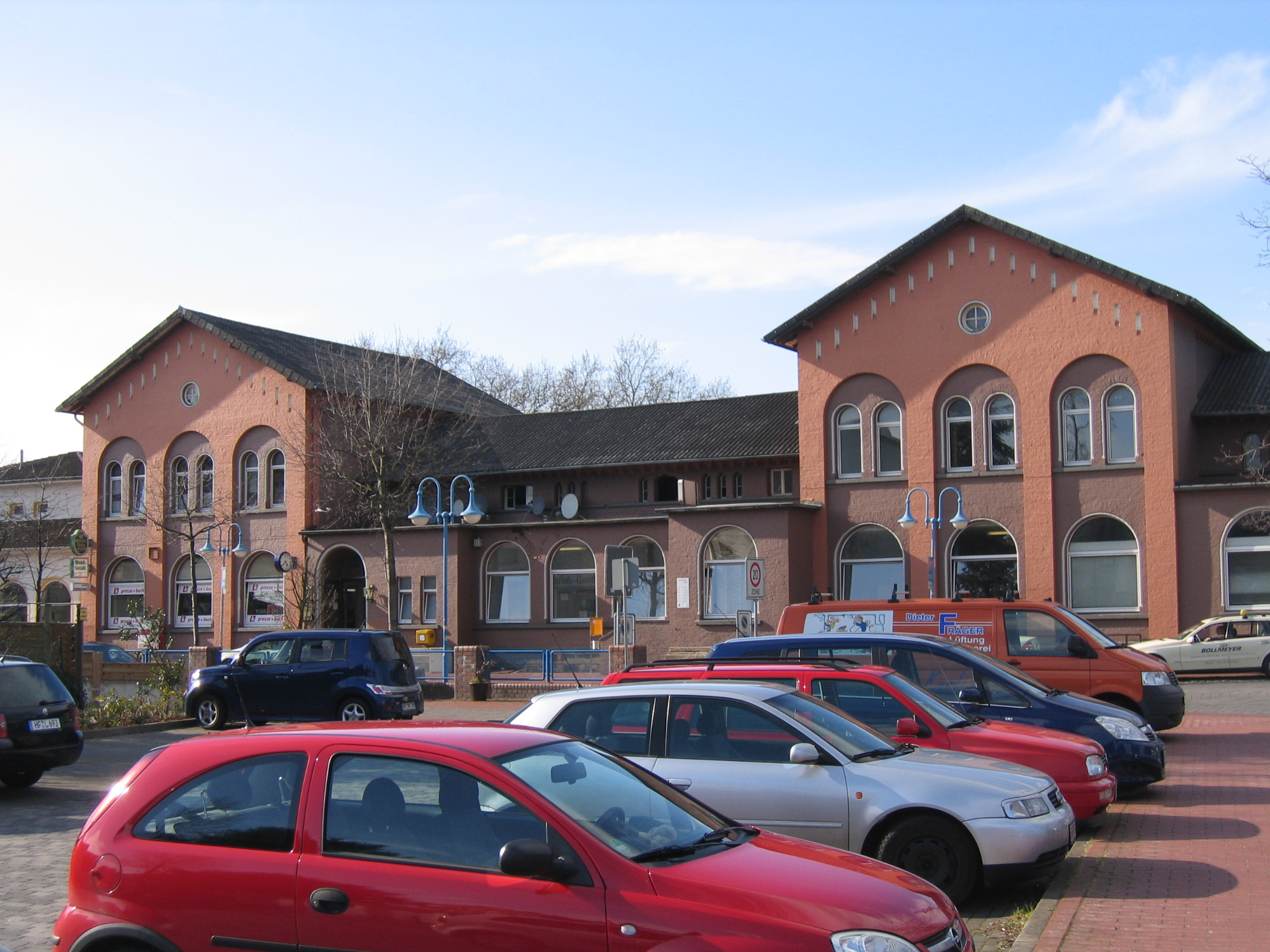
The train station
