= Trams in Poland =

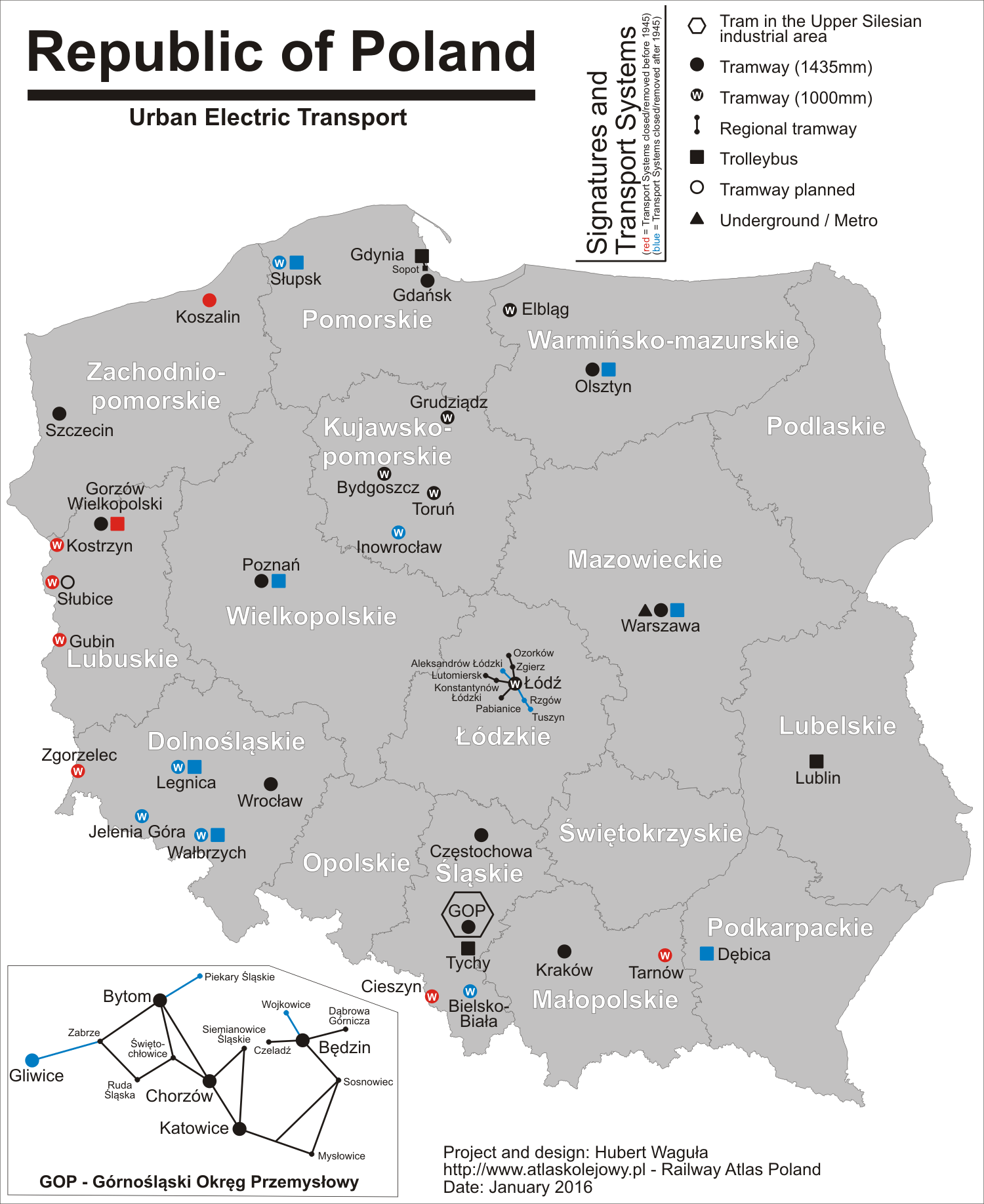
Public transport system

This is a list of trams in Poland. It includes all tram systems in Poland, past and present; cities with currently operating systems, and those systems themselves, are indicated in bold and blue background coloured rows. Those tram systems that operated on other than standard gauge track (where known) are indicated in the 'Notes' column.

Name of system	Location	Traction type	Date (from)	Date (to)	Notes
Trams in Białystok	Białystok	Horse	1895	1915	
Trams in Bielsko-Biała	Bielsko-Biała	Electric	1895	1972	Gauge: 1,000 mm (3 ft 3 3/8 in)
Trams in Bydgoszcz	**Bydgoszcz**	Horse	18 May 1888	1896	Gauge: 1,000 mm (3 ft 3 3/8 in)
Trams in Bydgoszcz	**Bydgoszcz**	Electric	1895		**Gauge: 1,000 mm (3 ft 3 3/8 in)**
Trams in Teschen	Cieszyn (Teschen)	Electric	12 February 1911	2 April 1921	Gauge: 1,000 mm (3 ft 3 3/8 in). Note: The Austrian-ruled town of Teschen (Polish: Cieszyn; Czech: Těšín) became part of Poland in 1918, following the collapse of Austria-Hungary. The suburb of Sachsenberg (Polish: Saska Kępa), west of the river Olza (Polish: Olza; Czech: Olše) became part of Czechoslovakia as Český Těšín from 28 July 1920. The tramway connected the railway station (in Český Těšín) to the business centre (in Cieszyn). It suffered financial losses following division of the town and was therefore closed in 1921.
Trams in Częstochowa	**Częstochowa**	Electric	8 March 1959		**1,435 mm (4 ft 8+^{1}/_{2} in)**
Trams in Elbląg	**Elbląg**	Electric	23 November 1895		**Gauge: 1,000 mm (3 ft 3 3/8 in)**
Trams in Gdańsk	**Gdańsk**	Horse	22 June 1873	1896	
Trams in Gdańsk	**Gdańsk**	Electric	1895		**1,435 mm (4 ft 8+^{1}/_{2} in)**
Trams in Gorzów Wielkopolski	**Gorzów Wielkopolski**	Electric	29 July 1899		**1,435 mm (4 ft 8+^{1}/_{2} in)**
Trams in Grudziądz	**Grudziądz**	Horse	15 June 1896	1899	**Gauge: 1,000 mm (3 ft 3 3/8 in)**
Trams in Grudziądz	**Grudziądz**	Electric	1899		**Gauge: 1,000 mm (3 ft 3 3/8 in)**
Trams in Inowrocław	Inowrocław	Electric	1912	1962	Gauge: 1,000 mm (3 ft 3 3/8 in)
Trams in Jelenia Góra	Jelenia Góra	Natural gas	1897	1899	
Trams in Jelenia Góra	Jelenia Góra	Electric	1900	1967	Gauge: 1,000 mm (3 ft 3 3/8 in)
Silesian Interurbans	**Katowice** and the Metropolis GZM	Steam	24 May 1894	1895	Gauge: 785 mm (2 ft 6 29/32 in)
Silesian Interurbans	**Katowice** and the Metropolis GZM	Electric	1898		**System serves neighboring towns including Bytom, Chorzów, Gliwice, Sosnowiec and the Zagłębie Dąbrowskie area.**
Trams in Koszalin	Koszalin	Electric	21 December 1911	30 September 1938	
Trams in Kraków	**Kraków**	Horse	1 November 1882	1890	
Trams in Kraków	**Kraków**	Electric	1901		**Nowa Huta, founded as a separate industrial town in 1949, was amalgamated with Kraków in 1951 and has been served by the Kraków tramway system from 1952.**
Trams in Legnica	Legnica	Electric	1898	1969	Gauge: 1,000 mm (3 ft 3 3/8 in)
Trams in Łódź	**Łódź**	Electric	24 December 1898		**Gauge: 1,000 mm (3 ft 3 3/8 in).** **Also serves neighbouring towns of Konstantynów Łódzki (see article), Lutomiersk (see article), Ozorków (see article), Pabianice (see article) and Zgierz (see article)**
Trams in Olsztyn	**Olsztyn**	Electric	1907	1965	Gauge: 1,000 mm (3 ft 3 3/8 in)
Trams in Olsztyn	**Olsztyn**	Electric	19 December 2015		
Trams in Poznań	**Poznań**	Horse	30 July 1880	?	
Trams in Poznań	**Poznań**	Electric	1898		**Fast tram opened 1 March 1997 (see Poznański Szybki Tramwaj).**
Trams in Frankfurt (Oder)	Słubice	Electric	1898	28 September 1945	Gauge: 1,000 mm (3 ft 3 3/8 in); Słubice was part of Frankfurt (Oder), Germany, until 1945 and was served by a tramway line that crossed the river Odra (German: Oder). Between 2004 and 2016 extension of the Frankfurt system into Słubice was considered but ultimately dropped.
Trams in Słupsk	Słupsk	Horse	1905	?	Gauge: 1,000 mm (3 ft 3 3/8 in)
Trams in Słupsk	Słupsk	Electric	1910	1959	Gauge: 1,000 mm (3 ft 3 3/8 in)
Trams in Szczecin	**Szczecin**	Horse	23 August 1879	1898	
Trams in Szczecin	**Szczecin**	Electric	1897		**1,435 mm (4 ft 8+^{1}/_{2} in)**
Trams in Tarnów	Tarnów	Electric	1911	1942	Gauge: 1,000 mm (3 ft 3 3/8 in)
Trams in Toruń	**Toruń**	Horse	1891	1899	**Gauge: 1,000 mm (3 ft 3 3/8 in)**
Trams in Toruń	**Toruń**	Electric	16 May 1899		**Gauge: 1,000 mm (3 ft 3 3/8 in)**
Trams in Wałbrzych	Wałbrzych	Electric	1898	1966	Gauge: 1,000 mm (3 ft 3 3/8 in)
Trams in Warsaw	**Warsaw** (Warszawa)	Horse	11 December 1866	September 1914	Also ran for 6 weeks in the spring 1917.
Trams in Warsaw	**Warsaw** (Warszawa)	Electric	26 March 1908		**Gauge originally 1,524 mm (5 ft), whole network converted gradually to standard gauge in late 1940s**
Trams in Wrocław	**Wrocław**	Horse	10 July 1877	1906	
Trams in Wrocław	**Wrocław**	Electric	1893		**1,435 mm (4 ft 8+^{1}/_{2} in)**

== See also ==
- List of town tramway systems in Europe
- List of tram and light rail transit systems
- List of metro systems
