= Krampsbach =

River in Germany

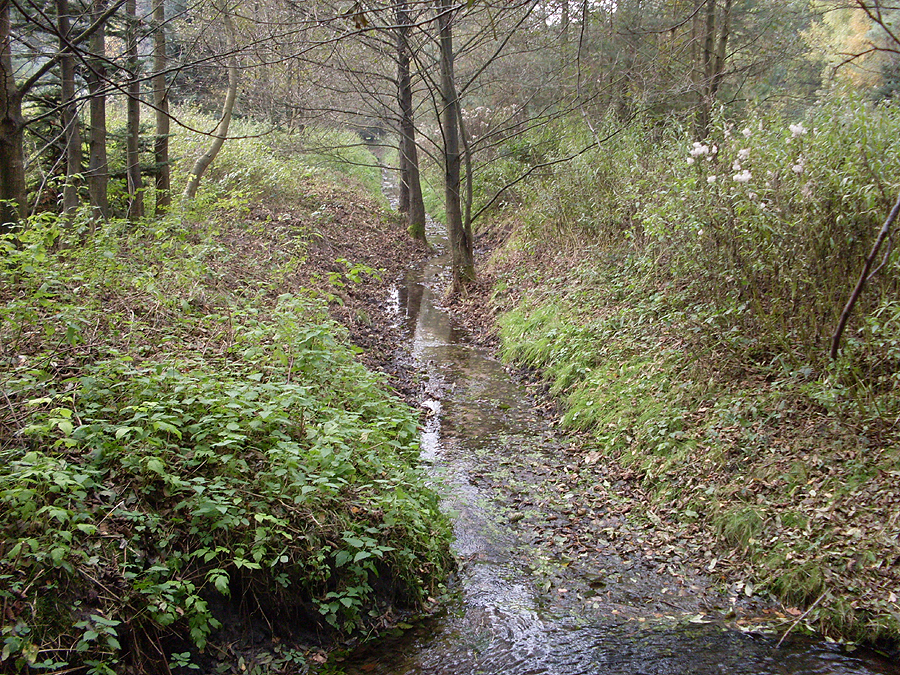

Location
- Country: Germany
- States: North Rhine-Westphalia

Physical characteristics
- Mouth
  - location: Landerbach
  - coordinates: 51.9183°N 8.6317°E

Basin features
- Progression: Landerbach→ Ölbach→ Wapelbach→ Dalke→ Ems→ North Sea

Krampsbach is a small river of North Rhine-Westphalia, Germany. It is 1.2 km long and flows into the Landerbach as a right tributary in Schloß Holte-Stukenbrock.

== See also ==
- List of rivers of North Rhine-Westphalia
