= Schnakenbach =

River in Germany

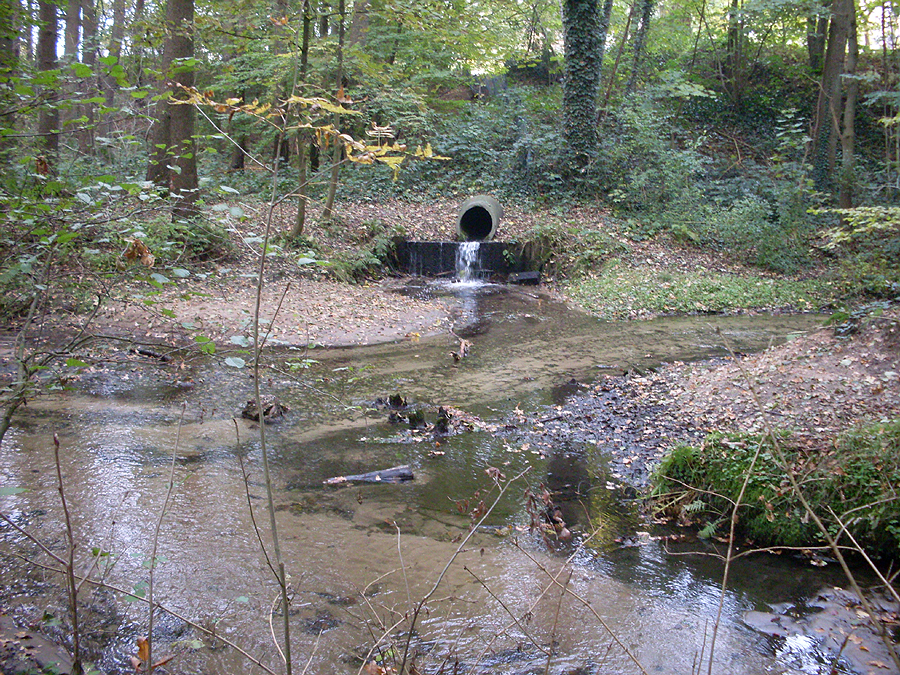

Location
- Country: Germany
- States: North Rhine-Westphalia

Physical characteristics
- Mouth
  - location: Westerholter Bach
  - coordinates: 51.9112°N 8.6516°E

Basin features
- Progression: Westerholter Bach→ Ölbach→ Wapelbach→ Dalke→ Ems→ North Sea

Schnakenbach is a small river of North Rhine-Westphalia, Germany. It is 3.4 km (2.1 mi) long and flows as a right tributary into the Westerholter Bach in Schloß Holte-Stukenbrock.

== See also ==
- List of rivers of North Rhine-Westphalia
