= Bielefeld Stadtbahn =

Light rail system in Bielefeld, North Rhine-Westphalia, Germany

Coordinates: 52°02′21″N 8°29′49″E

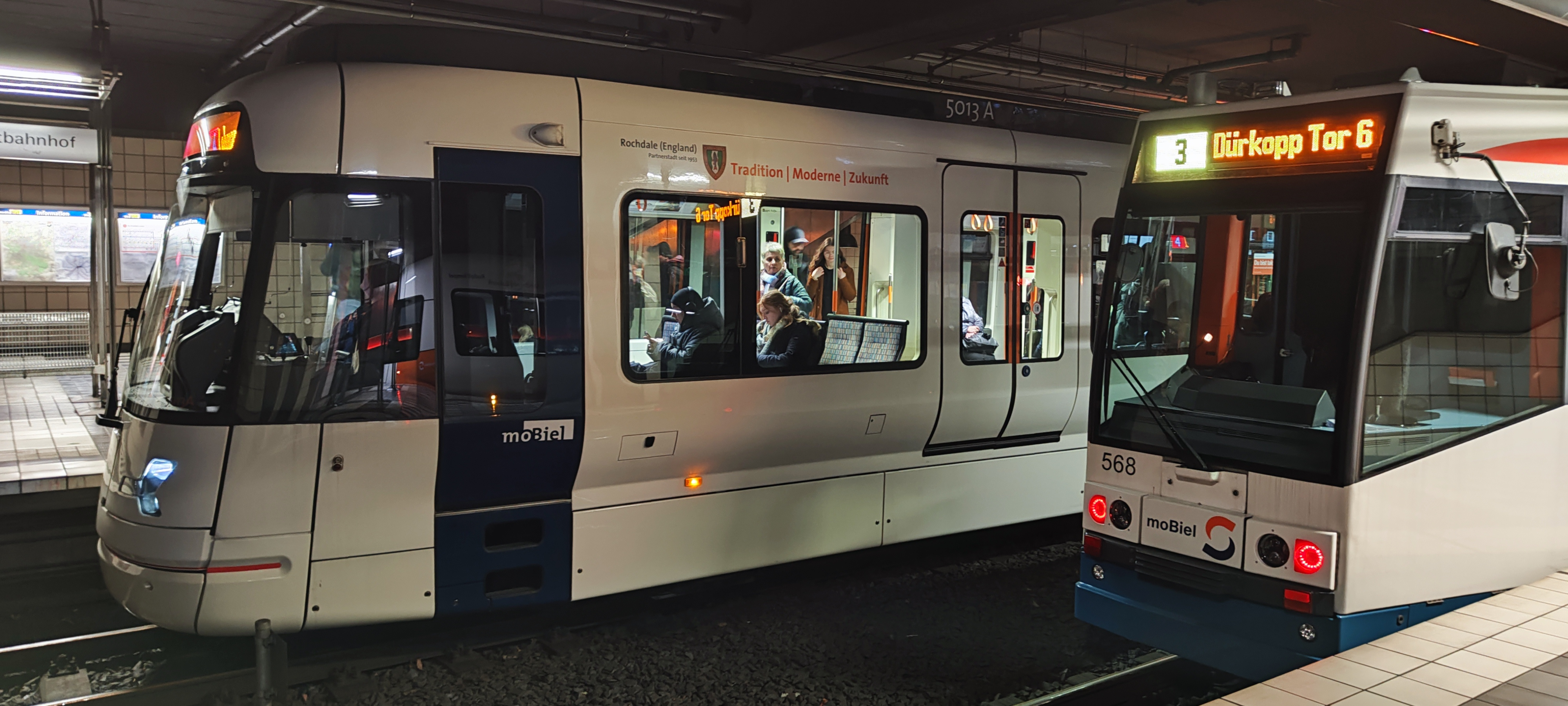

Overview
- Locale: Bielefeld, North Rhine-Westphalia, Germany
- Transit type: Light rail (Stadtbahn)
- Number of lines: 4
- Number of stations: 63
- Annual ridership: 35.16 million (2025)
- Website: moBiel

Operation
- Began operation: 1991
- Operator: moBiel
- Number of vehicles: 81

Technical
- System length: 33.5 km (20.8 mi)
- Track gauge: 1,000 mm (3 ft 3 3/8 in)
- Average speed: 22.3 km/h (13.9 mph)
System map

The Bielefeld Stadtbahn is a metre-gauge light rail (Stadtbahn) network in the city of Bielefeld, North Rhine-Westphalia, Germany. The system includes some segments built to rapid transit standards. It is operated by moBiel, a subsidiary of Bielefeld Stadtwerke, the Bielefeld municipal authority, and is integrated in the Westfalentarif transport association. It served 35.16 million passengers in 2025.

== History ==
The Stadtbahn was developed from Bielefeld's tramways, which opened in 1900. Between 1971 and 1991 the system was upgraded with tunnels under the city centre. The official inauguration of a three-line Stadtbahn was in 1991, when the main tunnel section opened and all tram tracks in the city centre closed. A fourth line to the University area, with another two underground stations, was added to the network in 2000.

=== Tramways ===
The first tram line in Bielefeld began operating on 20 December 1900, running from Brackwede to Johannistift. It was built to metre gauge and electrified from its opening. By 1930 the network had grown to a length of 22.1 km (13.7 mi) with three lines: 1, Sennefriedhof–Schildesche; 2, Walkenweg–Sieker and 3, Langestraße–Oststraße. The tram lines were badly damaged during World War II and their closure was considered, but on 29 June 1955 the city council decided to keep the tram system. They began improving the network with sections of reserved track and new rolling stock. The first plans for underground sections were announced in 1963. In 1968 a 900 m (3,000 ft) section of line 1 was moved onto part of the trackbed of the Bielefelder Kreisbahn, a metre-gauge railway which had closed in 1954. Line 3 was extended from Walkenweg to Baumheide in 1969 and again to Milse in 1978.

=== Going underground ===
The initial plans for the Bielefeld Stadtbahn were for a standard-gauge system replacing the metre-gauge tramways, similar to the Rhine-Ruhr Stadtbahn. Plans were considered which included two tunnels under the city centre, one running north–south and the other east–west, or a single north-south tunnel shared by all lines, as was eventually built. The system eventually built retained the metre gauge but uses high-floor vehicles with high platforms and is designed so that regauging would be possible in future.

The first section of tunnel opened in September 1971. It runs below Herforder Straße for 250 m (820 ft) and includes an underground station at Beckhausstraße. It was originally used by line 3 until in 1976 lines 2 and 3 exchanged their northern branches. As well as construction of the tunnel other changes as the trams became a Stadtbahn included the high platforms at stations and a system to give the light rail vehicles priority at traffic lights.

After the opening of the first underground section of the Stadtbahn no progress was made on the main city centre tunnel for several years due to engineering difficulties and lack of funding. Construction of the tunnel began in 1977 and it opened on 27 April 1991 with four new underground stations. The stations at Hauptbahnhof and Jahnplatz, and the tunnel between them, were served by all three Stadtbahn lines. At its northern end the tunnel split into three branches to the north and east with another two station at Wittekindstraße and Nordpark.

=== Further expansion ===
Construction of a fourth line, a 4.5 km (2.8 mi) long branch running westwards to Bielefeld University, began in 1995. From its junction with the existing Stadtbahn at Hauptbahnhof the new line runs in a tunnel for 2 km (1.2 mi) with two underground stations, at Siegfriedplatz and Rudolf-Oetker-Halle, and then continues above ground with another seven stations. Apart from the stations the underground sections were constructed as two single-track tunnels using the New Austrian tunnelling method. The line opened in April 2000.

The most recent expansion of the system is a 1.3 km (0.81 mi) extension of line 2 from Milse to Altenhagen.

== Operations ==
=== Hours of operation and frequencies ===
Service run until around 1 a.m. every day, with service starting at 4:30 a.m. every weekday, 6:00 a.m. on Saturdays 8:15 a.m. on Sundays. Trains on each line run every 10 minutes during the day and every 15 minutes in the evening and on Sundays. On weekend nights, there is an hourly service, so there is a proposal for 24-hour service.

=== Lines ===
The Bielefeld Stadtbahn is made up of four lines, with a total track length of 68.1 kilometres (42.3 mi). The mainline network operates over a total line length of 40.4 kilometres (25.1 mi), serving 63 stops, of which seven are underground stations.

The system's four lines are:

Line	Length	Route
1	11 km (6.8 mi)	Schildesche – Hauptbahnhof – Jahnplatz – Bethel – Brackwede – Senne
2	11 km (6.8 mi)	Altenhagen – Milse – Baumheide – Hauptbahnhof – Jahnplatz – Sieker
3	5 km (3.1 mi)	Babenhausen-Süd – Hauptbahnhof – Jahnplatz – Dürkopp Tor 6
4	10 km (6.2 mi)	Lohmannshof – University – Hauptbahnhof – Jahnplatz – Sieker Mitte – Stieghorst

Until 31 July 2021 four more supplemental lines were operated with numbers 10, 12, 13 and 18, which are now labelled with the normal line numbers.

== Future plans ==
A 1.2 km (0.75 mi) extension of line 4 with two new stations is planned to open in around 2029 to better serve the campus of Bielefeld University of Applied Sciences. There are plans for line 1 to be extended 6 km (3.7 mi) from its current terminus at Senne to Sennestadt.

=== Line 5 ===
In 2013 the city council proposed a new Line 5 connecting Sennestadt, on an extension of the southern branch of line 1, and Heepen via a new above-ground route through the city centre. A new route across the city centre would have been needed due to the limited capacity of the tunnel and would have been built for low-floor trams. The plans were rejected in a referendum in 2014.

== Rolling stock ==
As of 2026, the fleet comprised 36 Duewag M8D and 40 Vamos light rail vehicles and five MB4 trailers.

=== Stadtbahnwagen M ===
Back-to-back pair of M8D vehicles

The Stadtbahnwagen M8 is an eight-axle bi-directional articulated light rail vehicle developed by Duewag in cooperation with Stadtbahn operators in Bielefeld and the Ruhr. The first four vehicles delivered to Bielefeld were of type M8S in 1976 and numbered 501–504. Between 1981 and 1987 a total of 44 Stadtbahnwagen M8C vehicles, numbered 516–559, were acquired ready for the opening of the city centre tunnel. The main differences from the earlier M8S was the more modern control system, using chopper control (hence the C in the name) and folding steps allowing access from either high platforms or street level. As the M8S were not suitable for the new high platforms they were sold in 1987 to Mainz. From 1986 the M8C vehicles began operating in coupled pairs. The M8C were taken out of service between 2010 and 2023. Some were sent to Łódź, Poland, for further use.

The Stadtbahnwagn M8D were delivered in two batches, 20 vehicles in 1994–1995 and 16 in 1998–1999, ready for the opening of line 4, and are numbered 560–595. They are similar to the M8C but have cabs at only one end and must be operated in back-to-back pairs and have a more advanced drive system with asynchronous motors (German: Drehstromantrieb).

In order to further increase capacity five unpowered four-axle trailers were delivered by Siemens/Adtranz from 1999. They are designated MB4, numbered 511–515, and used coupled between two M8D vehicles. Although unpowered they have their own pantographs for power supply and heating.

=== Vamos ===
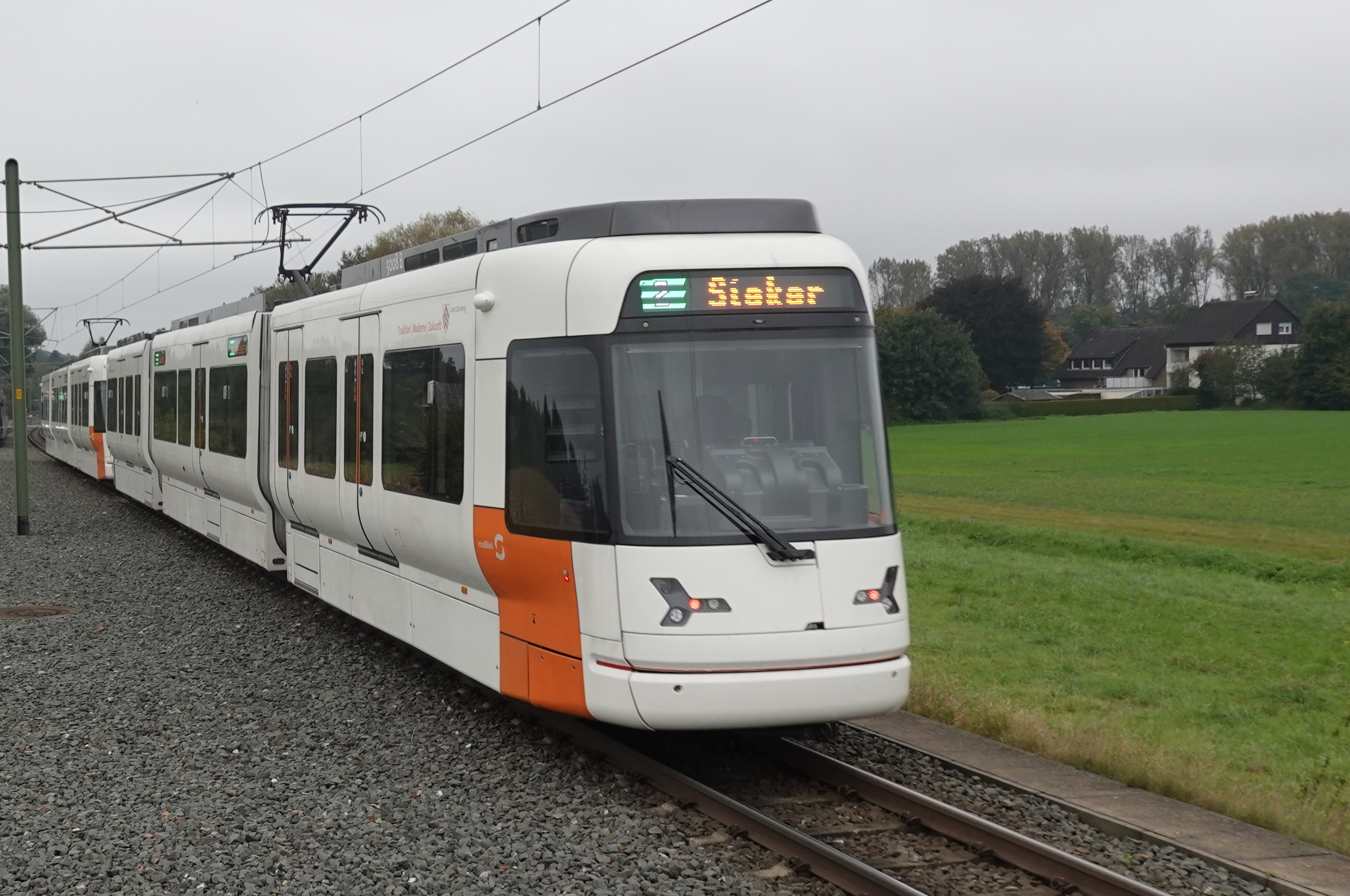
Vamos light rail vehicle

Two batches of Vamos light rail vehicles have been supplied by a consortium of Vossloh Kiepe and HeiterBlick. The first 16 vehicles were ordered in 2009 and delivered from 2011–2012. Another 24 vehicles were ordered in 2017 and delivered in 2020–2023

The Vamos vehicles have three sections and a cab at each end. They are longer than the Stadtbahnwagen M (34 m (112 ft) instead of 27 m (89 ft)) and are the same width (2,300 mm (91 in)) as the older vehicles at platform height but curve outwards to 2,650 mm (104 in) wide to increase capacity, with space for 230 passengers. Although the Stadtbahn tunnel had been built ready for wider vehicles, the track and stops in some other places had to be modified for the Vamos vehicles. Eighteen vehicles from the second batch are not fitted with folding steps and can only serve stops with high platforms. As of 2021 this restricted the Vamos vehicles to lines 2 and 4, with those without folding steps only capable of operating on line 4.
