= Ölbach =

Ölbach may refer to:

- Ölbach (Berkel), a river of North Rhine-Westphalia, Germany, tributary of the Berkel
- Ölbach (Wapelbach), a river of North Rhine-Westphalia, Germany, tributary of the Wapelbach
