= Wiedey =

River in Germany

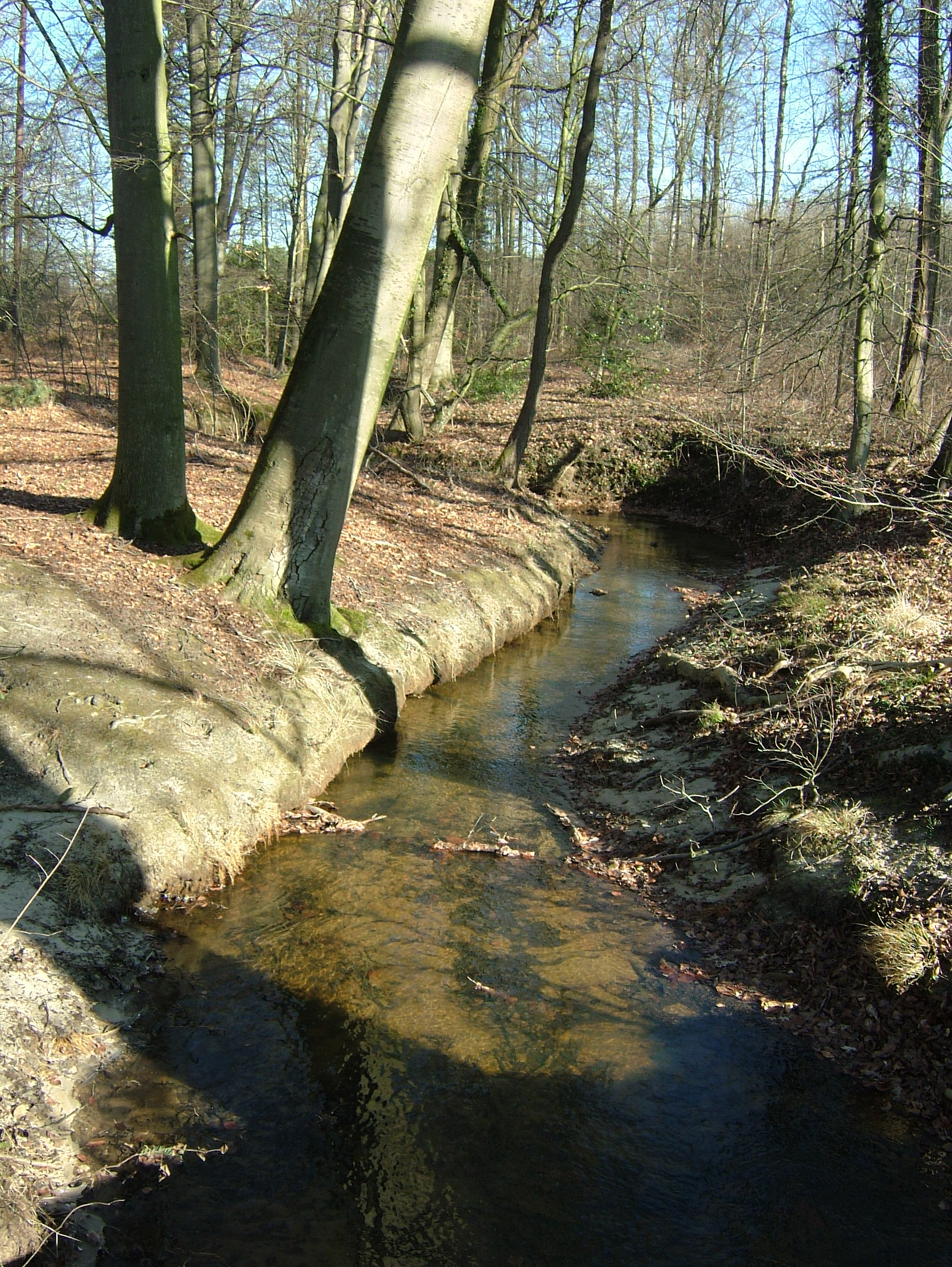

Location
- Country: Germany
- State: North Rhine-Westphalia

Physical characteristics
- Mouth
  - location: Ölbach
  - coordinates: 51.8718°N 8.3476°E
- Length: 8.3 km (5.2 mi)

Basin features
- Progression: Ölbach→ Wapelbach→ Dalke→ Ems→ North Sea

Wiedey is an 8.3-kilometre-long (5.2 mi) river in North Rhine-Westphalia, Germany. It flows into the Ölbach near Gütersloh.

== See also ==
- List of rivers of North Rhine-Westphalia
