= Landerbach =

River in Germany

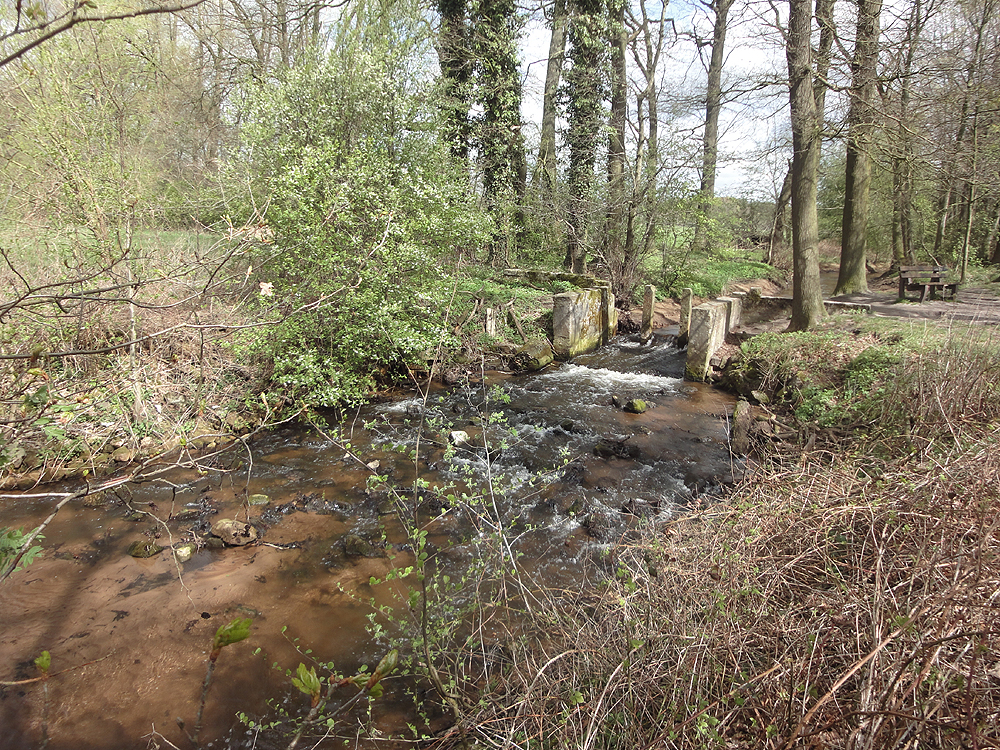

Location
- Country: Germany
- State: North Rhine-Westphalia

Physical characteristics
- Mouth
  - location: Ölbach
  - coordinates: 51°53′22″N 8°31′25″E
- Length: 11.4 km (7.1 mi)

Basin features
- Progression: Ölbach→ Wapelbach→ Dalke→ Ems→ North Sea

Landerbach is a river of North Rhine-Westphalia, Germany. It flows into the Ölbach near Verl.

== See also ==
- List of rivers of North Rhine-Westphalia
