= Westerholter Bach =

River in Germany

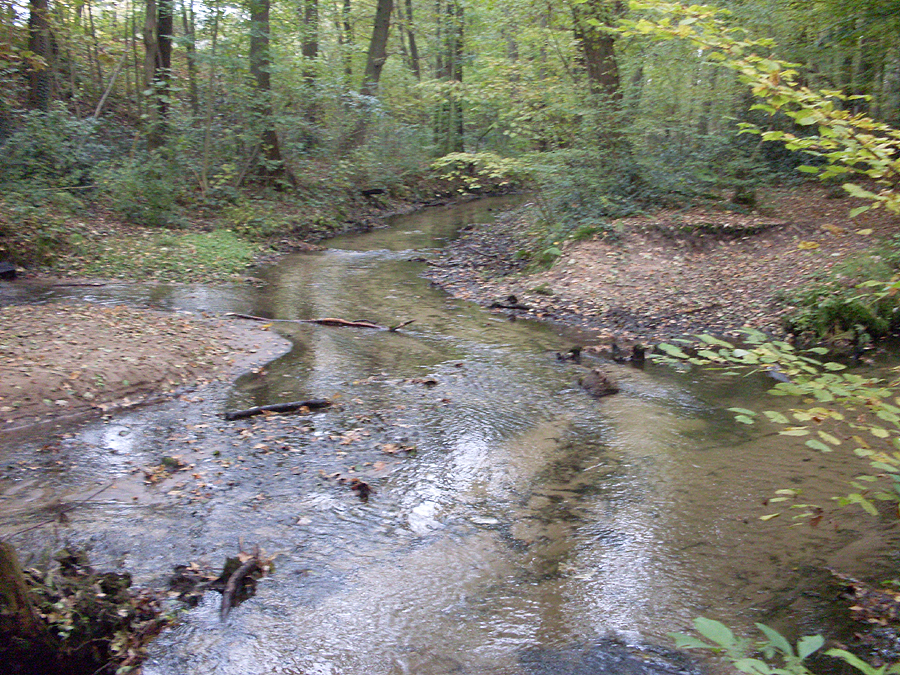

Location
- Country: Germany
- State: North Rhine-Westphalia

Physical characteristics
- Mouth
  - location: Ölbach
  - coordinates: 51.9111°N 8.6514°E

Basin features
- Progression: Ölbach→ Wapelbach→ Dalke→ Ems→ North Sea

Westerholter Bach (or Westerholterbach) is a small river of North Rhine-Westphalia, Germany. It is 1.6 km (1.0 mi) long and flows as a right tributary into the Ölbach in Schloß Holte-Stukenbrock.

== See also ==
- List of rivers of North Rhine-Westphalia
