= Sprungbach =

River in Germany

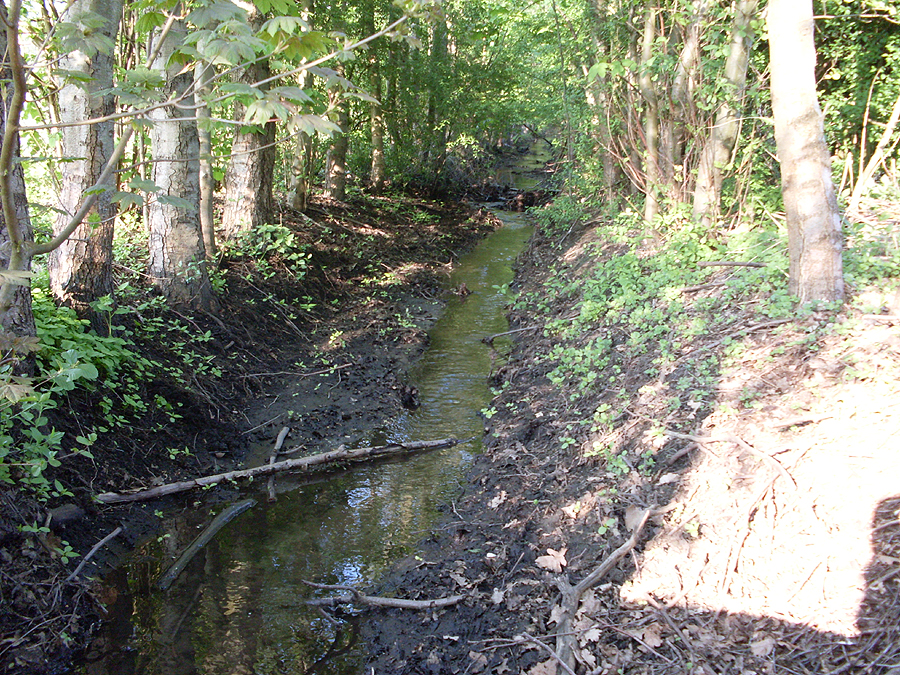

Location
- Country: Germany
- State: North Rhine-Westphalia

Physical characteristics
- Source
  - coordinates: 51°56′38″N 8°36′23″E
- Mouth
  - location: Dalke
  - coordinates: 51.9303°N 8.5589°E

Basin features
- Progression: Dalke→ Ems→ North Sea

Sprungbach is a small river of North Rhine-Westphalia, Germany. It flows into the Dalke near Sennestadt.

== See also ==
- List of rivers of North Rhine-Westphalia
