= Strothbach =

River in Germany

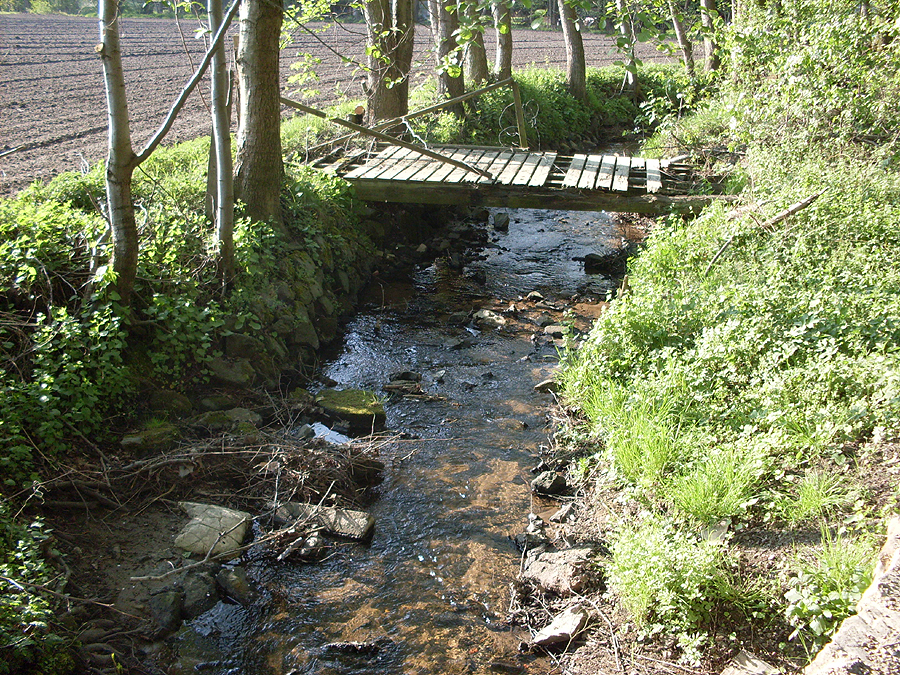

Location
- Country: Germany
- State: North Rhine-Westphalia

Physical characteristics
- Mouth
  - location: Dalke
  - coordinates: 51.9203°N 8.5411°E

Basin features
- Progression: Dalke→ Ems→ North Sea

Strothbach is a small river of North Rhine-Westphalia, Germany. It is 5 km (3.1 mi) long and is a left tributary of the Dalke near Sennestadt.

== See also ==
- List of rivers of North Rhine-Westphalia
