= Trams in Mainz =

Tramway network in Germany

Coordinates: 50°00′N 08°16′E

Mainz tramway network
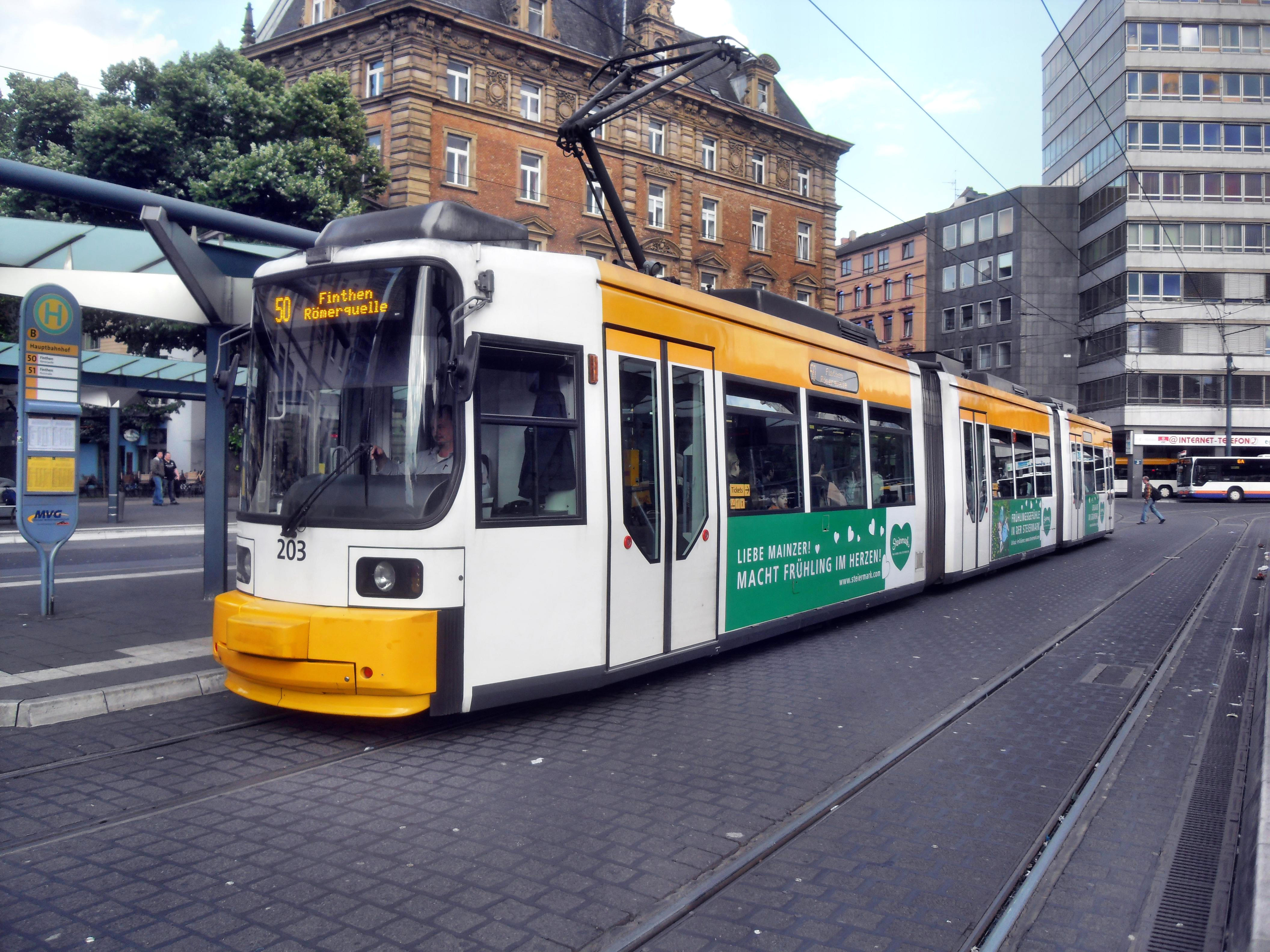
- GT6M tram at Mainz Hauptbahnhof, 2009

Operation
- Locale: Mainz, Rhineland-Palatinate, Germany

Statistics
Horsecar era: 1883–1904
- Status: Converted to electricity
- Operators: Mainzer Straßenbahn AG (1883–1895); Süddeutsche Eisenbahn-Gesellschaft (SEG) (1895–1904)
- Track gauge: 1,000 mm (3 ft 3 3/8 in) metre gauge
- Propulsion system: Horses
Steam tram era: 1891–1923
- Status: Converted to electricity
- Operator: Süddeutsche Eisenbahn-Gesellschaft (SEG)
- Track gauge: 1,000 mm (3 ft 3 3/8 in)
- Propulsion system: Steam
Electric tram era: since 1904
- Status: Operational
- Lines: 5
- Owner: City of Mainz (since 1904)
- Operator: Mainzer Verkehrsgesellschaft (MVG) (since 2001)
- Track gauge: 1,000 mm (3 ft 3 3/8 in)
- Propulsion system: Electricity
- Electrification: 600 V DC
- Depot: 1
- Stock: 29
- Track length (total): 29,7 km
- Website: http://www.mvg-mainz.de Mainzer Verkehrsgesellschaft (in German)

The Mainz tramway network (German: Straßenbahnnetz Mainz) is a network of tramways forming part of the public transport system in Mainz, the capital city of the federal state of Rhineland-Palatinate, Germany.

Opened in 1883, the network has been operated since 2001 by the Mainzer Verkehrsgesellschaft (MVG), and is integrated in the Rhein-Main-Verkehrsverbund (RMV).

== Lines ==
As of 2017, the Mainz tramway network has the following five lines:

Line	Route
50	Hechtsheim/Bürgerhaus ↔ Hechtsheim/Mühldreieck ↔ Hechtsheim/Jägerhaus ↔ Mainz/Pariser Tor ↔ Mainz/Hauptbahnhof ↔ Mombach/Turmstraße (Haltepunkt Waggonfabrik) ↔ Gonsenheim/Kapellenstraße ↔ Finthen/Gemarkungsgrenze ↔ Finthen/Römerquelle
51	Finthen;↔ Mainz/Hauptbahnhof ↔ Hauptbahnhof West;↔ Universität;↔ Lerchenberg;↔ (launched: 2016)
52	Hechtsheim/Am Schinnergraben ↔ Hechtsheim/Jägerhaus ↔ Mainz/Pariser Tor ↔ Mainz/Hauptbahnhof ↔ Mainz/Zahlbach ↔ Bretzenheim/Bahnstraße
53	Hechtsheim/Bürgerhaus ↔ Hechtsheim/Mühldreieck ↔ Hechtsheim/Jägerhaus ↔ Mainz/Pariser Tor ↔ Mainz/Hauptbahnhof ↔ Universität ↔ Lerchenberg
59	Zollhafen ↔ Bismarckplatz ↔ Mainz Hauptbahnhof ↔ Hauptbahnhof West ↔ Hochschule Mainz (launched: 2017)

Since Autumn 2016, the "Mainzelbahn" has been transporting passengers from Hauptbahnhof West (main station, west entrance) via University and Marienborn to Lerchenberg, and offers a fast connection between the main station and the University as well as the headquarters of ZDF ("Zweites Deutsches Fernsehen", a public television channel in Germany) in the district of Lerchenberg. Further, a new line is planned. The "Zollhafen Tram" links the new Zollhafen residential area with the tram network. To operate the new lines, the MVG ordered 10 Variotrams from Stadler Rail.

== Rolling stock ==
Manufacturer	Type	Quantity	Numbers	built in	low-floor vehicle	Notes
Duewag / Siemens	M8S	1	277	1975	no	Bought in 1987/89 from Bielefeld Stadtbahn; Identical vehicles 278-280 were scrapped in 2016.
Duewag / Siemens	M8C	6	271–276	1984	no	Modernised at Ceglec in Prague between 2015 and 2017.
Adtranz	GT6M-ZR	16	201–216	1996	yes	
Stadler Rail	Variobahn	9	217–225	2011/12	yes	
Stadler Rail	Variobahn	10	227-236	2015/16	yes	Ten further trams for operating the new Mainzelbahn and Zollhafen line.

== See also ==
- List of town tramway systems in Germany
- Trams in Germany
