= Trams in Zgierz =

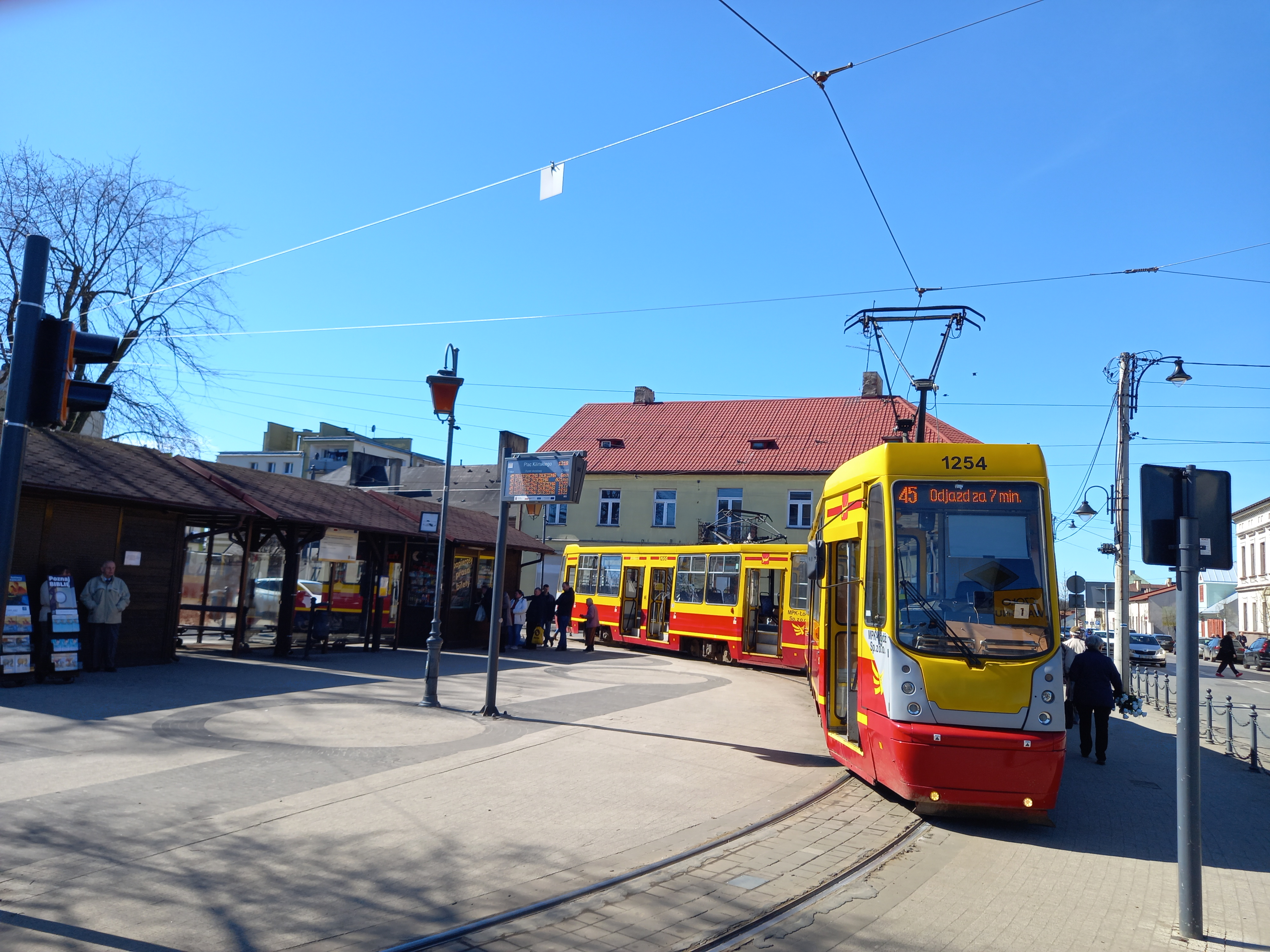

Operation
- Locale: Zgierz, Poland
- Open: 1901
- Lines: 2
- Operator: MPK Łódź

Infrastructure
- Track gauge: 1,000 mm (3 ft 3 3/8 in) metre gauge
- Electrification: 600 V DC overhead

Statistics
- Stops: 13
Overview
- single-track sections are marked with thin line

Trams in Zgierz are operated by MPK Łódź Sp. z o.o. They consist of two connected lines and are connected to the Łódź tram network, forming its part.

== Lines ==
- 45 (Łódź) – Łódzka – 1 Maja – Plac Kilińskiego
- 46 (Łódź) – Łódzka – Stary Rynek – Łęczycka – Ozorkowska – (Ozorków)

== History ==
The Łódź–Zgierz line was opened in early 1901. It was built and operated by Łódzkie Wąskotorowe Elektryczne Koleje Dojazdowe (Łódź Narrow-gauge Electric Commuter Railways). The line was technically compatible with the Łódź trams network (same gauge and electrification system), allowing interrunning, but the two were not connected, passengers had to change at interchange stops located near the city limits. The line was worked by large-capacity, 4-axle motor coaches.

In 1922 an extension of the line, running through the north of the city to Ozorków, was opened.

In 1948 both the companies owning and operating the city and suburban tram networks were nationalised and Łódź became responsible for the public tram transport in the area.

In the early 1970s the last suburban motor coaches were withdrawn from service, since then the line was worked by the tramcars also used on the city network.

Political and economic changes after 1989 meant that a new approach to financing and running the public communication was necessary. The city became responsible for the public transport within the city limits, whereas the surrounding cities were expected to finance, and reach an agreement with the operator about, running the tram communication in their territories. Two cities – Ozorków i Zgierz – together with Łódź founded Międzygminna Komunikacja Tramwajowa Spółka z o.o. (Inter-gmina Tram Communication Ltd.) that became the operator of the services on the line. On 1 April 2012 MPK Łódź took over running the services.

The condition of the line became progressively worse to the point that it was necessary to suspend the running of trams, On 4 February 2018 the trams stopped running. The works on the line between the southern city boundary and pl. Kilińskiego are expected to be completed at the end of 2021 or in early 2022. Part of the line to Ozorków within the city boundaries may also be rebuilt, and a new terminus in the northern suburb, Proboszczewice, may be built.

== See also ==
- Tramways in Łódź
