= Trams in Pabianice =

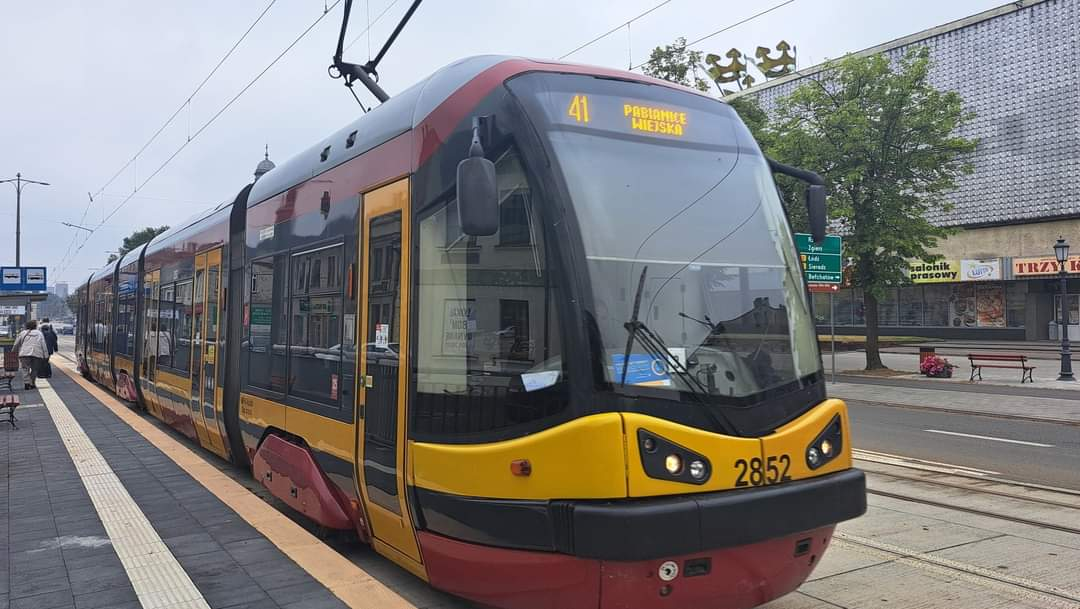

Operation
- Open: 1901
- Lines: 1
- Operator: MPK Łódź

Infrastructure
- Track gauge: 1,000 mm (3 ft 3 3/8 in) metre gauge
- Electrification: 600 V DC overhead

Statistics
- Stops: 18
Overview
- single-track sections are marked with thin line

Trams in Pabianice are operated by MPK Łódź Sp. z o.o. They consist of a single line and are connected, through Ksawerów, to the Łódź tram network, forming its part.

== Line ==
41 (Łódź) – (Ksawerów) – Warszawska – Stary Rynek – Zamkowa – Łaska – Wiejska

== History ==
The Łódź–Pabianice line was opened in early 1901. It was built and operated by Łódzkie Wąskotorowe Elektryczne Koleje Dojazdowe (Łódź Narrow-gauge Electric Commuter Railways). The line was technically compatible with the Łódź trams network (same gauge and electrification system), allowing interrunning, but the two were not connected, passengers had to change at interchange stops located near the city limits. The line was worked by large-capacity, 4-axle motor coaches.

In 1948 both the companies owning and operating the city and suburban tram networks were nationalised and Łódź became responsible for the public tram transport in the area.

In the early 1970s the last suburban motor coaches were withdrawn from service, since then the line was worked by the tramcars also used on the city network.

Political and economic changes after 1989 meant that a new approach to financing and running the public communication was necessary. The city became responsible for the public transport within the city limits, whereas the surrounding cities were expected to finance, and reach an agreement with the operator about, running the tram communication in their territories. Two cities – Ozorków i Zgierz – together with Łódź founded Międzygminna Komunikacja Tramwajowa Spółka z o.o. (Inter-gmina Tram Communication Ltd.) that became the operator of, among others, the Pabianice line. On 1 January 2004 MPK Łódź took over the operation of the line.

The condition of the line became progressively worse to the point that it was necessary to suspend the running of trams and perform a complete rebuild of it. Works started in early December 2019 and has been completed 1 July 2023.

== See also ==
- Trams in Łódź
