= Hasselbach (Dalke) =

River in Germany

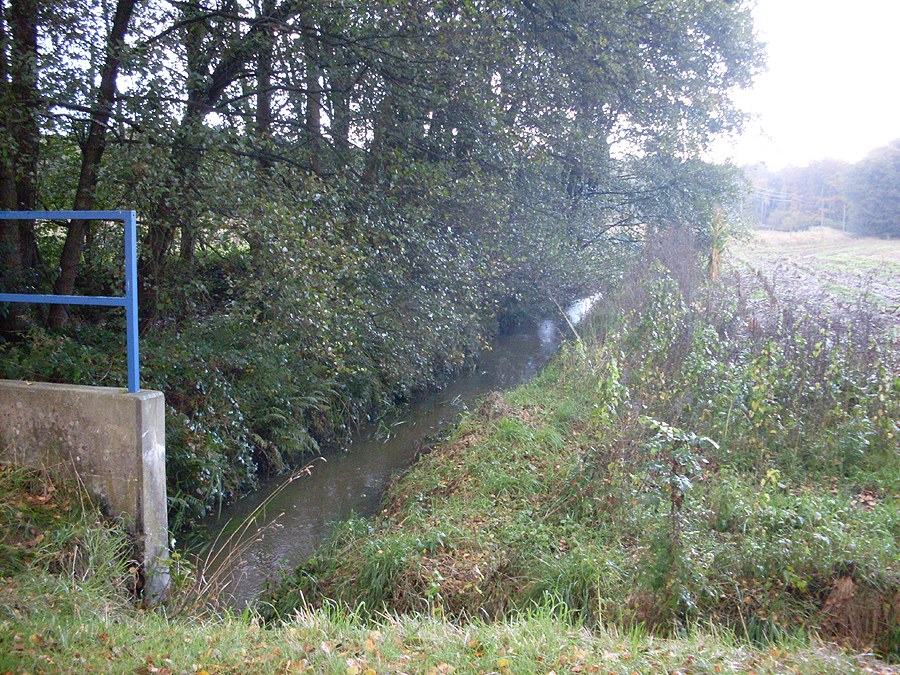

Location
- Country: Germany
- States: North Rhine-Westphalia

Physical characteristics
- Mouth
  - location: Dalke
  - coordinates: 51.9108°N 8.4981°E

Basin features
- Progression: Dalke→ Ems→ North Sea

Hasselbach is a small river of North Rhine-Westphalia, Germany. It is 6.3 km long and a right tributary of the Dalke near Verl.

It is one of eight rivers and streams in North Rhine-Westphalia named Hasselbach.

== See also ==
- List of rivers of North Rhine-Westphalia
