= Bekelbach =

River in Germany

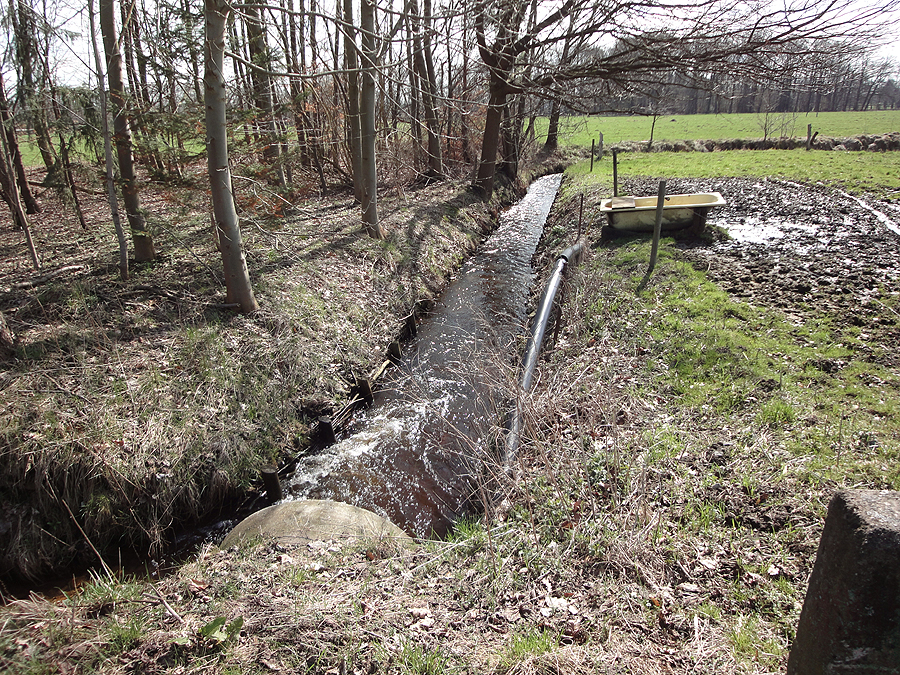

Location
- Country: Germany
- State: North Rhine-Westphalia

Physical characteristics
- Mouth
  - location: Dalke
  - coordinates: 51.9069°N 8.4644°E
  - elevation: 84 m (276 ft)
- Length: 6.8 km (4.2 mi)

Basin features
- Progression: Dalke→ Ems→ North Sea

Bekelbach is a 6.8 km (4.2 mi) long river of North Rhine-Westphalia, Germany. It flows into the Dalke east of Gütersloh.

== See also ==
- List of rivers of North Rhine-Westphalia
