= Ölbach (Berkel) =

River in Germany

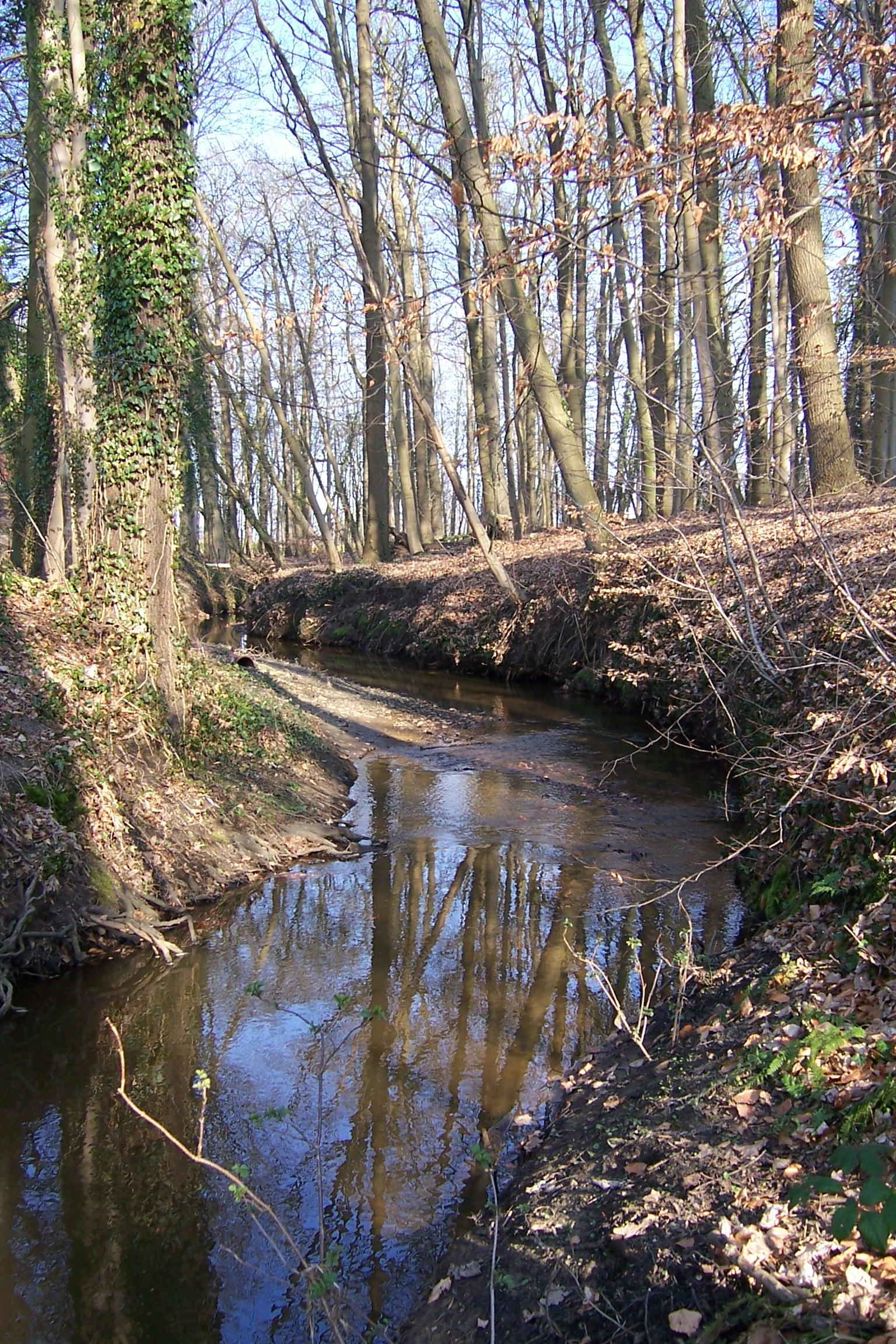

Location
- Country: Germany
- State: North Rhine-Westphalia

Physical characteristics
- Mouth
  - location: Berkel
  - coordinates: 52.0631°N 6.7809°E
- Length: 18.9 km (11.7 mi)

Basin features
- Progression: Berkel→ IJssel→ IJsselmeer

Ölbach is a river of North Rhine-Westphalia, Germany. It is a right tributary of the Berkel near Vreden.

The Ölbach is one of the few outcrops of this region due to the topographic nature (gentle hills and flat land) of the Münsterland and is known for its numerous finds of belemnites. In its upper and middle reaches it exposes the gray clay layers belonging the Albian (Lower Cretaceous), and its many fossils.

== See also ==
- List of rivers of North Rhine-Westphalia
