= Trams in Konstantynów Łódzki =

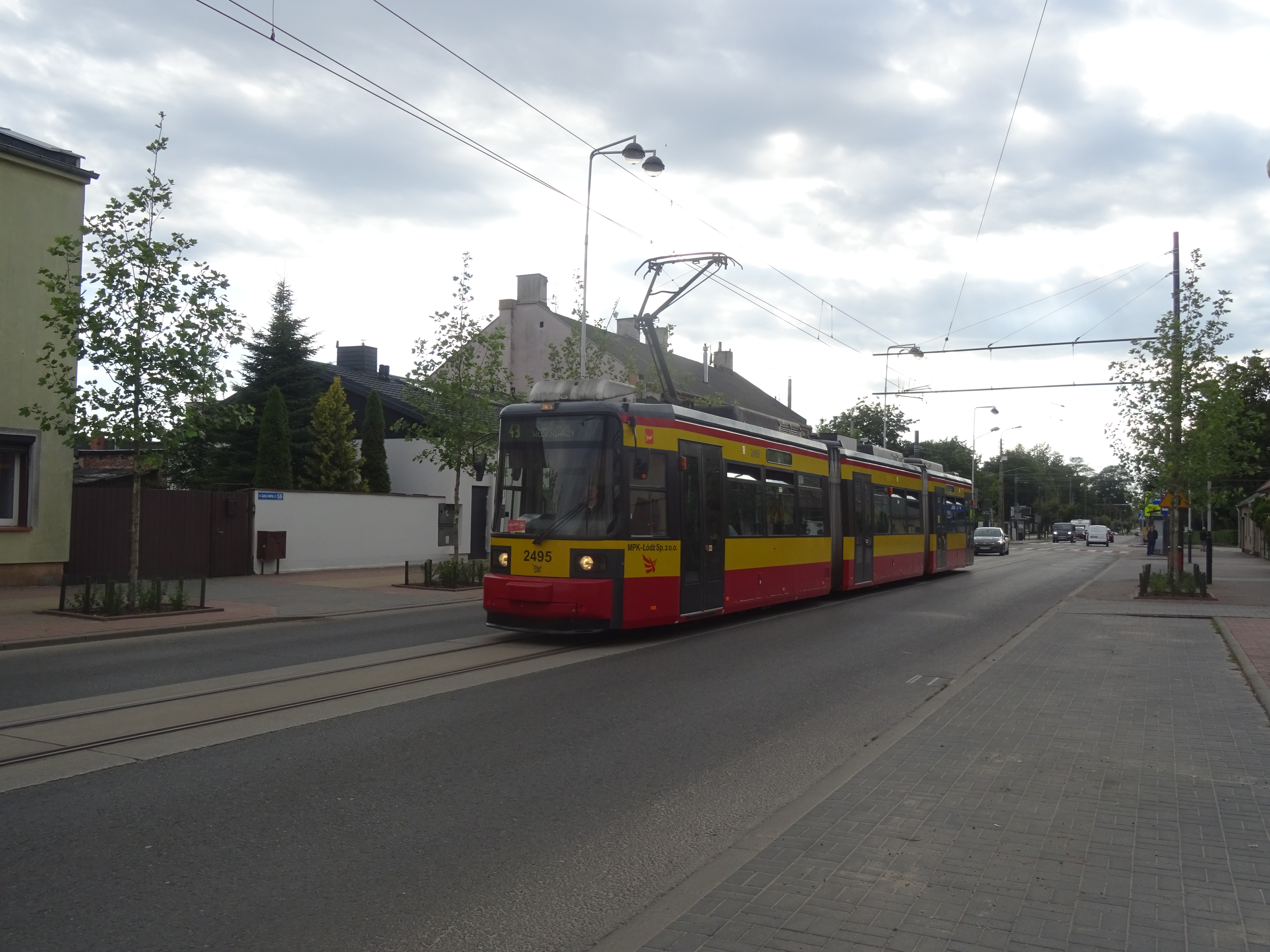

Operation
- Locale: Konstantynów Łódzki, Poland
- Open: 1911
- Lines: 1
- Operator: MPK Łódź

Infrastructure
- Track gauge: 1,000 mm (3 ft 3 3/8 in) metre gauge
- Electrification: 600 V DC overhead

Statistics
- Stops: 18
Overview
- single-track sections are marked with thin line

Trams in Konstantynów Łódzki are operated by MPK Łódź Sp. z o.o. There is a single line connected to the Łódź tram network.

== Line ==
43A (Łódź) – Łódzka – Jana Pawła II – Plac Wolności

== History ==
The Łódź–Konstantynów Łódzki line was opened in 1911. It was built and operated by Łódzkie Wąskotorowe Elektryczne Koleje Dojazdowe (Łódź Narrow-gauge Electric Commuter Railways). The line was technically compatible with the Łódź trams network (same gauge and electrification system), allowing interrunning, but the two were not connected, passengers had to change at interchange stops located near the city limits. In 1929 the line was extended through the western part of the city to Lutomiersk.

In 1948, both the companies owning and operating the city and suburban tram networks were nationalised and Łódź became responsible for the public tram transport in the area.

In the early 1970s, the last dedicated suburban rolling stock was withdrawn from service, since when the line was worked by the tramcars also used on the city network.

Political and economic changes after 1989 meant that a new approach to financing and running the public communication was necessary. The city became responsible for the public transport within the city limits, whereas the surrounding cities were expected to finance, and reach an agreement with the operator about, running the tram communication in their territories. Two cities – Konstantynów Łódzki and Lutomiersk – together with Łódź founded Tramwaje Podmiejskie Spółka z o.o. (Suburban Trams Ltd.) that became the operator of the services on the line. On 1 April 2012 MPK Łódź took over running the services.

The condition of the line became progressively worse to the point that it was necessary to suspend the running of trams. On 3 March 2019, the trams stopped running.

The revitalisation of the section from Łódź to Plac Wolności (the Konstantynów terminus) was scheduled to start in 2022 and trams are due to return by the end of 2023. It reopened on 1 July 2024 after five years.

== See also ==
- Trams in Łódź
