= Trams in Ozorków =

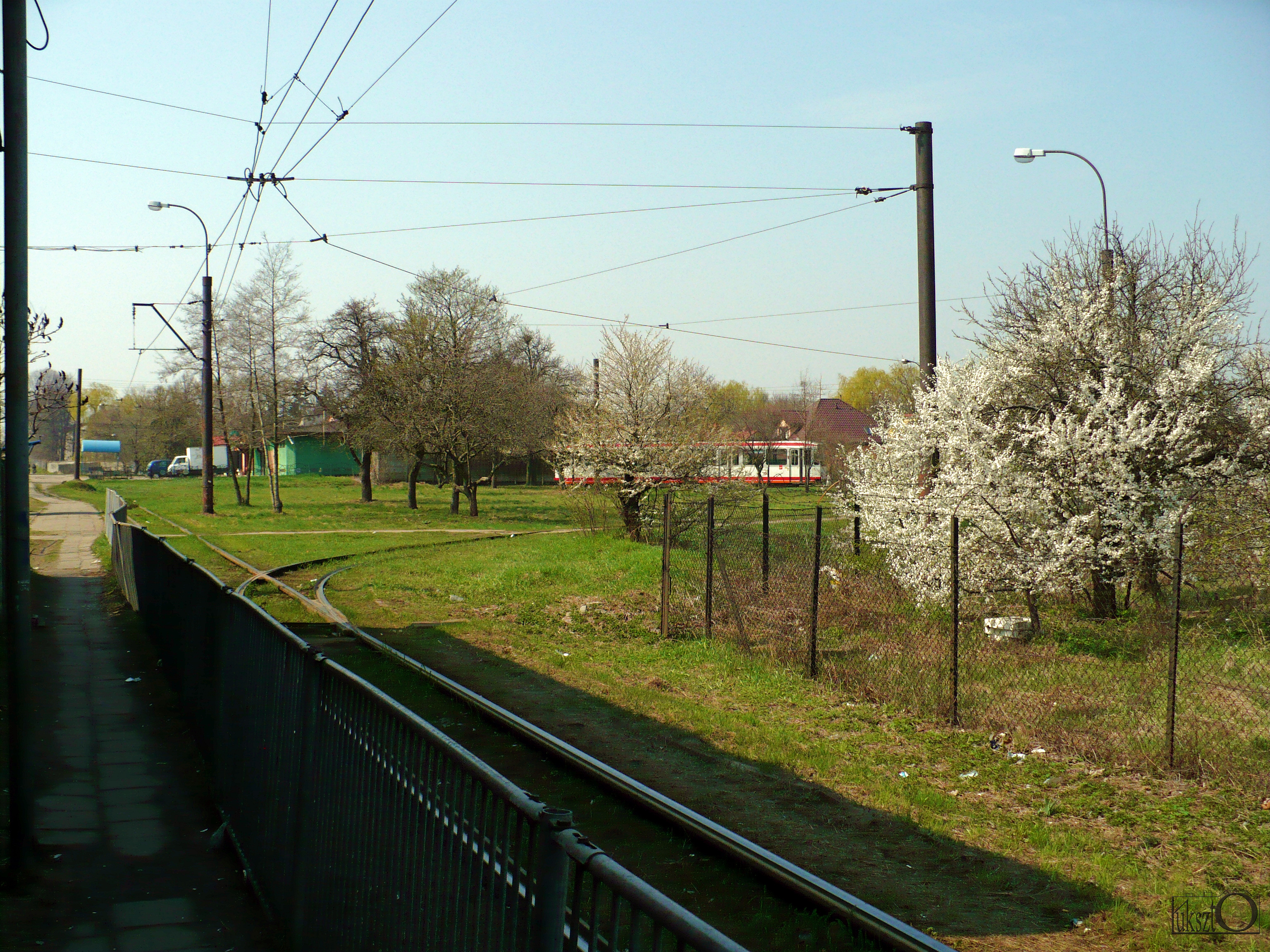
- Ozorków tram terminus

Operation
- Locale: Ozorków, Poland
- Open: 1922
- Lines: 1
- Operator(s): MPK Łódź

Infrastructure
- Track gauge: 1,000 mm (3 ft 3 3/8 in) metre gauge
- Electrification: 600 V DC overhead
- Stops: 6
Overview
- single-track sections are marked with thin line

Trams in Ozorków are operated by MPK Łódź Sp. z o.o. They consist of a single line and are connected, through Zgierz, to the Łódź tram network, forming its part.

== Line ==
46 (Łódź) – (Zgierz) – Zgierska – Wyszyńskiego – Konstytucji 3 Maja – Cegielniana

== History ==
The Łódź–Ozorków line was opened in 1922 as an extension to the already existing Łódź–Zgierz. It was built and operated by Łódzkie Wąskotorowe Elektryczne Koleje Dojazdowe (Łódź Narrow-gauge Electric Commuter Railways). Initially it was operated by steam, electrification was completed in 1926. The line was technically compatible with the Łódź trams network (same gauge and electrification system), allowing interrunning, but the two were not connected, passengers had to change at interchange stops located near the city limits.

In 1948, both the companies owning and operating the city and suburban tram networks were nationalised and Łódź became responsible for the public tram transport in the area.

In the early 1970s, the last dedicated suburban rolling stock was withdrawn from service, since then the line was worked by the tramcars also used on the city network.

Political and economic changes after 1989 meant that a new approach to financing and running the public communication was necessary. The city became responsible for the public transport within the city limits, whereas the surrounding cities were expected to finance, and reach an agreement with the operator about, running the tram communication in their territories. Two cities – Ozorków and Zgierz – together with Łódź founded Międzygminna Komunikacja Tramwajowa Spółka z o.o. (Inter-gmina Tram Communication Ltd.) that became the operator of the services on the line. On 1 April 2012, MPK Łódź took over running the services.

The condition of the line became progressively worse to the point that it was necessary to suspend the running of trams. On 3 February 2018, the trams stopped running.

Gmina Zgierz, one of two rural local authorities that own the middle part of the line, has found it difficult to come up with funding for the works on its section. Nevertheless, Ozorków is committed to perform repair works on its territory and to restore tram services, provided that the other sections of the line, connecting it to Łódź tram network, are also restored.

== See also ==
- Trams in Łódź
