= Sennestadt =

Quarter of Bielefeld, Germany

- District
- Location within Germany
- Coordinates: 51°56′52″N 8°35′06″E
- Country: Germany
- State: North Rhine-Westphalia
- City: Bielefeld
- Established: 1956
- Founder: Hans Bernhard Reichow

Government
  - Type: District

Population
  - Total: 21,000
- Demonym: Sennestädter
- Time zone: UTC+1 (CET)
  - Summer (DST): UTC+2 (CEST)
- Postal code: 33689, 33699
- Area code: 05205
- ISO 3166 code: DE-NW

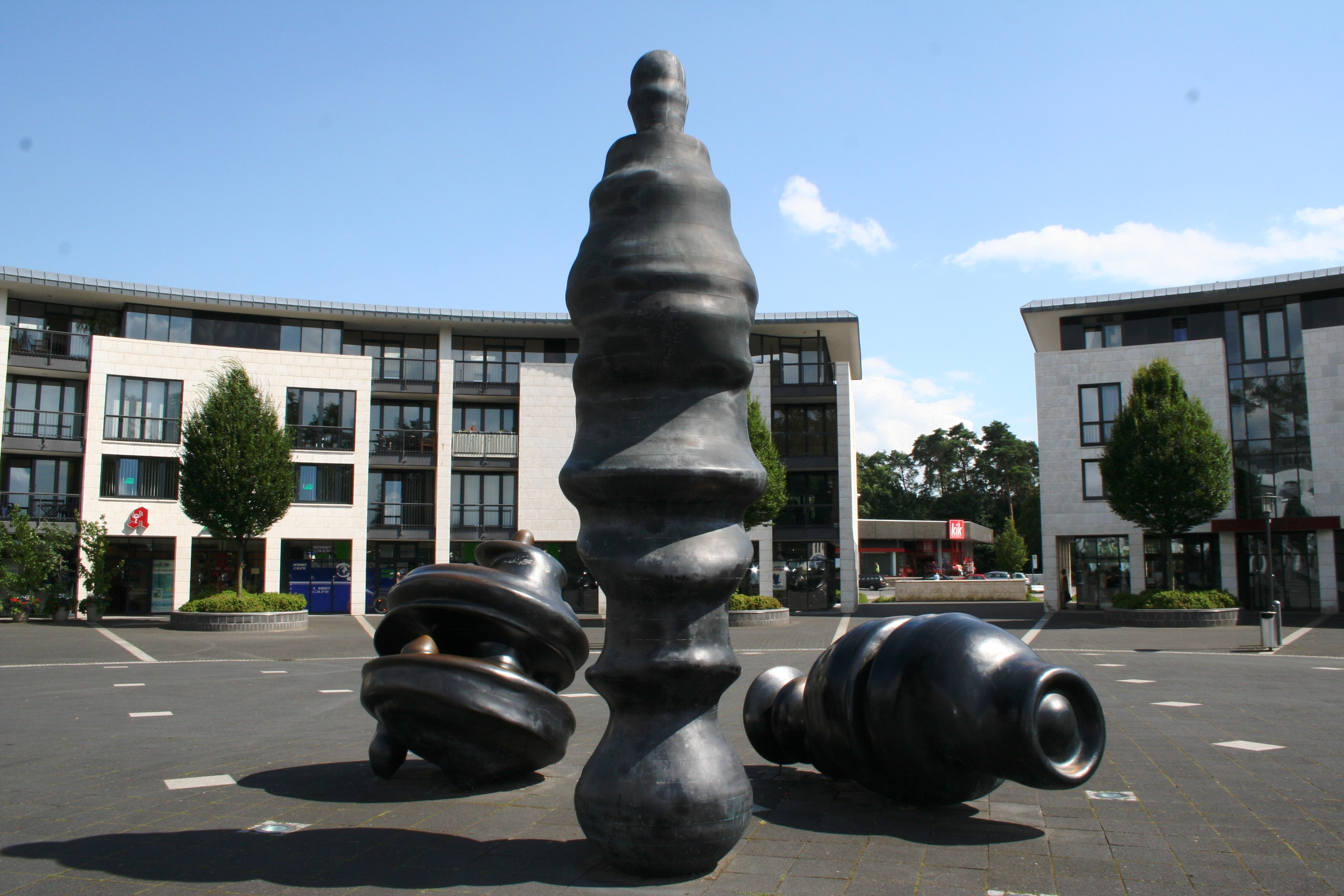

Sennestadt is a district in the South-East of the German city of Bielefeld in North Rhine-Westphalia. With some 21,000 residents, it is renowned as a remarkable feat of urban planning. The satellite town of Sennestadt was created in the 1950s, in the heathlands and grasslands of the former municipality of Senne II, in accordance with the designs of the urban planner, Hans Bernhard Reichow, and it was primarily intended for post-war displaced persons and refugees. The town's many distinctive urban planning features have attracted international attention.

== History ==
The area in which the present district is situated was originally called Heepen-Senne (also Heepensenne or Heeper Senne) and it belonged to the County of Ravensberg. From 1346 onwards, it belonged to the County of Berg and, from 1647 onwards, to Brandenburg-Prussia. From 1813 onwards, Heepen-Senne was given the name "Senne II" and from 1816 onwards, it became a municipality in the District of Bielefeld.

On 15 February 1956 the Regional Authority of Westphalia-Lippe, the District of Bielefeld and the Municipality of Senne II founded the company, Sennestadt GmbH, in order to realise the award-winning plans of the architect and urban planner, Hans Bernhard Reichow. The goal was to build a new satellite town "on the green meadows" that was primarily intended for post-war refugees and displaced persons. Reichow's design was based on the "organic urban planning" of which he was a proponent, a form of urban planning that was inspired by the laws of nature and which strove for a decentralised city with plenty of greenery that provided a decent standard of living. Sennestadt GmbH purchased the necessary site, measuring around 400 hectares, provided the financial resources, developed the site and sold it to investors and eager developers. The first homes were occupied in 1958 and the new satellite town was essentially completed by the mid-1960s.

The Municipality of Senne II, which was part of the Administrative District of Brackwede, became the City of Sennestadt by charter dated 27 April 1965. In the context of the municipal reforms in Greater Bielefeld, Sennestadt – together with the rest of the District of Bielefeld – was amalgamated with the City of Bielefeld on 1 January 1973. In Sennestadt there was fierce opposition to the amalgamation. However, the legal objections to the local government reforms codified in the Bielefeld Act – which went all the way to the German Constitutional Court – were to no avail.

== Urban planning, traffic and architecture ==
Pursuing his concept of "organic urban planning" and an "organic urban landscape", the planner and architect, Hans Bernhard Reichow, used the features of the landscape – the protected area of Bullerbachtal and a gravel pit that was created while the Autobahn was being built – in order to subdivide the new town, which held a German Grünes Kreuz (‘Green Cross’), into three boroughs: the Südstadt (‘South City’), the Weststadt (‘West City’) and the Oststadt (‘East City’). Sports fields were built on the site of the gravel pit, while a municipal park was built in Bullerbachtal. Reichow's requirement, that an urban model should incorporate all areas of life, tied in with the reformist concepts for society and living that characterised urban planning at the start of the 20th century. The buildings were supposed to be geared towards the rhythms of life and the modes of behaviour of their residents. In addition, the planners took the term "urban landscape" to mean a cityscape that neither closed itself off, as in the medieval city, nor sprawled outwards into the surrounding landscape, as in modern cities.

In accordance with Reichow's plans, the road network should remain largely grade separated and resemble the veins of a leaf. Therefore, the roads were built like arcs each of which flows in a slight curve into the higher-ranking road. For security reasons, the pedestrian network should be completely separate from the traffic roads. Reichow envisaged arranging the right of way intuitively through the architecture of the roads and not via signposts, traffic lights or right-to-left schematics.[26] Later on, however, the main roads in Sennestadt were signposted like normal right-of-way streets.

The locations of the town hall (Sennestadthaus), schools, churches, sports fields and shopping hubs should create correlations and make it easier for residents to get their bearings. At the same time the importance of these facilities should be specially accentuated by the architecture and the location.

When building the residential homes, Reichow dispensed with a rigid linear plan. Instead, he placed the houses in a "dynamic motion and decentralisation". They are also deliberately different in terms of height and structural shape, in order to create a dynamic building zone. The design of the homes was supposed to do justice to that era's new rhythm of life, increased freedom and the residents' habitability requirements. Most homes in Sennestadt are arranged in such a way that the main living room, the balcony and at least one children's bedroom gets the afternoon sun so that the residents can enjoy the sun during their free time. According to Reichow, the rooms "meander between due South and due West, i.e. within a 90-degree angle." Double balconies were avoided, in line with the human need for distance and privacy.

In order to give the city an attractive shape, when building Sennestadt, Reichow and the municipal politicians made sure to incorporate Kunst am Bau (‘Art in Construction’). From 1971 to 1975, the Sennestadthaus – originally planned as the town hall – was incorporated into a nine-story building on a headland in the dammed up Sennestadt Pond. In accordance with Reichow's plans, the Sennestadthaus – together with the central square (now known as Reichowplatz) in front of it and the surrounding service buildings – was supposed to represent the "city's crowning glory". Sennestadt's amalgamation with Bielefeld in 1973 meant that it never became the town hall but rather the seat of a district office and a cultural centre with an event and concert hall.

When Hans Bernhard Reichow died in 1974, a journalist also praised him for his cultural and historic role in Sennestadt: This city, which brought him worldwide success and was celebrated by thousands of people from around the globe as a prime example of German urban planning, had grown especially dear to his heart... In Sennestadt the urban planners ... were able to realise his ideas for a "car-friendly city". This is also the place where he successfully combined residential homes with industrial settlement. Reichow... was not concerned with creating a dormitory town outside the gates of Bielefeld. Sennestadt was to be a vibrant city. He also succeeded in that regard...

== Environmental aspects ==
From the outset, environmental aspects played an important role in planning Sennestadt. The Grünes Kreuz held by Bullerbachtal and West-Ost-Grünzug should not just retain the landscape within the city but also ensure the exchange of air and create attractive footpaths leading to the churches, schools and sports facilities. Covering the residential roads with greenery should also serve as soundproofing. Since the shape and arrangement of the residential homes also inc on the terrain, in terms of their shape and arrangement, they – together with the view into the Teutoburg woods – create quite varied green courtyards between the streets.

In order to settle industry at the edge of Sennestadt, Reichow developed a "distance table" which, depending on the type and size of the business, should protect the residential areas from noise, dust and exhaust gases.

When planning the shopping areas, the goal was to facilitate both arrival by car and modest shopping on foot.

== Sennestadt as the "historic city centre" ==
In 2010 the Association of Federal Monument Conservators classified Sennestadt as a "historic city centre with special importance in terms of monuments", with the following statement:

In the context of the project, in accordance with the terminology of UNTERMANN (2004), the term "historic city centre" is defined as a historic charter city. That also includes ... early modern and modern charter cities... In that respect, the historic city centre may also be amalgamated as a district of a larger city – as, for example in the case of Berlin-Spandau or Sennestadt. One important city centre from the 1950s is Bielefeld-Sennestadt, which is a prime example of organic urban planning, as conceived by H.B. Reichow.

Historical photos of both the overall planning and a series of buildings created by Reichow and others, such as the Jesus Christ Church, the Thomas Morus Church, the Haus der Gesundheit (‘House of Health’), the Ostallee shopping area (= lower Elbeallee), GAGFAH multiple-occupancy houses, the hall of the East City School (= Adolf Reichwein School), Kreissparkasse bank (= Sparkasse bank), a high-rise block in the East Alley (= Elbe Alley) and several factory buildings, are recorded in the international architecture database, archINFORM.

In 2007 the Regional Authorities of Rhineland and Westphalia-Lippe produced a list of "important, federally significant cultural landscape areas". In the cultural landscape area 7.01 "Senne and its adjacent Teutoburg Forest" Sennestadt, along with a few other examples, is highlighted as "one of the few new urban establishments in Westphalia-Lippe with a complete infrastructure after the Second World War." It was "a good example of the typical conception of architecture and urban planning during this period which was also discussed outside of Germany at the time."

A similar urban area developed by Reichow – Parkwohnanlage West in Nürnberg-Sündersbühl, built between 1962 and 1966 – was placed under protection by the Bavarian Office for the Conservation of Historical Monuments.

== Buildings ==
The district's traditional landmark, the Kreuzkirche – which dates back to 1894 – is in particular contrast to its modern landmark, the Sennestadthaus which was planned as the town hall and "crowning glory" of Sennestadt in 1969 and inaugurated in 1975. The District Administrative Office, adult education centre, youth art and music school, a technical college and Sennestadt GmbH moved into the building, instead of the mayor and the town council. First and foremost, the initially contentious building became the community centre of Sennestadt. The front building is especially striking, with its concert hall which is supported by pillars which stand in the water and the Kosmisches Raumelement (‘Cosmic Space Element’) sculpture by the sculptor, Bernhard Heiliger, on the exterior facade. In January and February 2007 Sennestadt GmbH had the facade of the Sennestadthaus, which used to be characterised by long balconies with concrete parapets, converted into a climate-friendly glass facade.

== Art in public spaces ==
In the context of the series of exhibitions, "Contemporary Sculpture I, II, III and IV" which were held between 1983 and 2004, Sennestadt GmbH and Sennestadtverein e.V. acquired numerous sculptures which shape the townscape to this day. This series was continued with Vor Ort. Kunstprojekt Sennestadt (‘On site. Sennestadt Art Project’) which was held from May to October 2014, under the artistic management of Thomas Thiel, Director of the Bielefeld Art Society. The artists, David Adamo, Awst & Walther, Michael Beutler, Andreas Bunte, Christian Falsnaes, Manfred Pernice, Arne Schmitt and Kateřina Šedá, were invited to participate in this project by Sennestadtverein e.V. on behalf of the District of Sennestadt. In the works, sculptures and interventions in public areas that were created especially for this project, the artists examine both the history and the current circumstances of the location and its urban planning process which has been going on for decades already, as well as changes in society. The further development of Reichow's original concept plays an important role in an urban restructuring project that has been running since 2008. Vor Ort marks an interim stage of this transformation.

== Urban restructuring and urban renewal ==
Therefore, against the background of demographic trends, from the end of 2006 onwards Sennestadt GmbH made every effort to ensure that Bielefeld-Sennestadt was included in the Stadtumbau West ('Urban Redevelopment West') Federal development programme, which was also decided upon by Bielefeld City Council in 2008. Sennestadt GmbH set up an office for this purpose in the Sennestadt Pavilion. In the context of several workshops, numerous goals and measures were defined jointly – together with many residents – for five areas of action: Townscape, Community & Neighbourhood, Living, Infrastructure and Commerce/Workspaces/Education. One significant measure in this regard is the improvement of public parks and the Sennestadt Pond.

Since 2014 a Renewal Manager has been in charge of the dynamic urban renewal. Among other things, this involves the scheduled renewal of high-rise blocks and terraced houses, in close coordination with home owners, landlords and tenants. In addition, Sennestadt GmbH is developing a climate protection area which will be connected to the town centre by way of urban planning.

== Trivia ==
In 1956, following the International Conference on Housing and Urban Planning (22–28 September 1956), stamps depicting five newly built post-war towns and suburbs were issued in Austria (images available on www.sennestadtverein.de). In addition to Sennestadt, they include the Prins Alexander polder in Rotterdam, the new town of Harlow outside London and the Vällingby suburb of Stockholm.
