= Trams in Łódź =

Tram system in Łódź, Poland

- Tramwaje w Łodzi
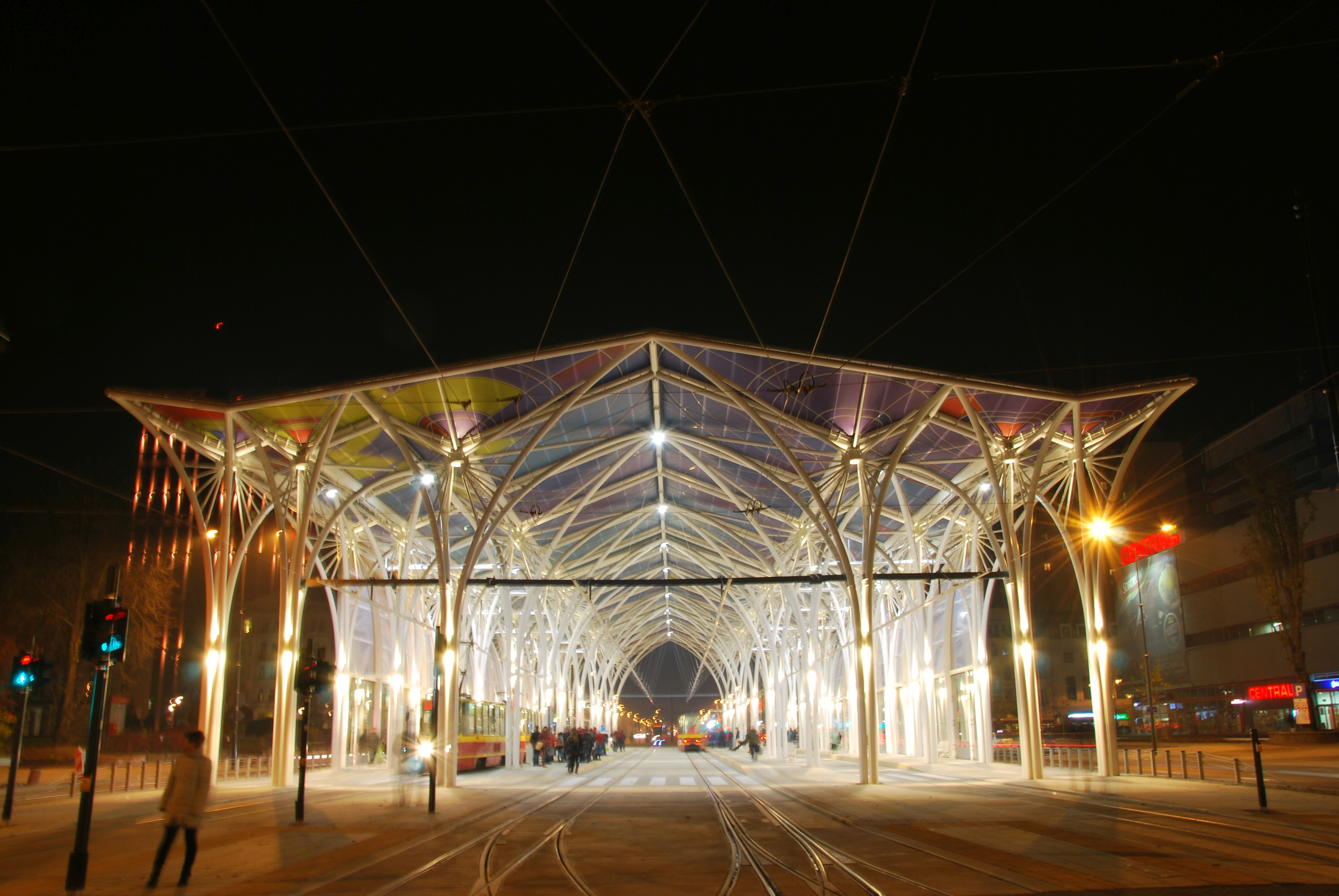
- "Piotrkowska Centrum" tram station

Operation
- Locale: Łódź, Poland
- Open: 23 December 1898
- Lines: 19
- Owner: City of Łódź
- Operator: MPK Łódź Sp. z o.o.

Infrastructure
- Type: Tram
- Track gauge: 1,000 mm (3 ft 3 3/8 in)
- Electrification: 600 V DC overhead

Statistics
- Track length (total): 124.1 km (77 mi)

The Łódź tram system is a tramway network located in Łódź, Poland that has been in operation since 1898.

The system is operated by MPK Łódź Sp. z.o.o. There are 24 tramlines with a total line length of 124.1 kilometres (77.1 mi). The system operates on 1,000 mm (3 ft 3 3/8 in) metre gauge (narrow gauge) track.

== History ==
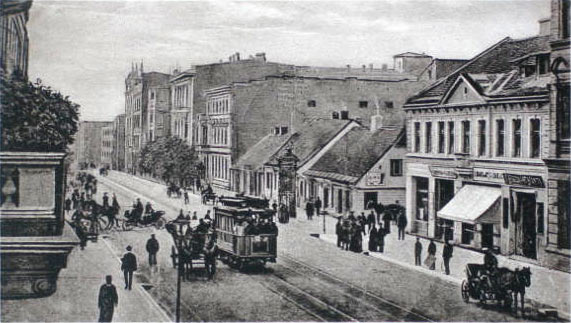
Tram in Łódź, 1900.

By the 1890s, Łódź was a large industrial city with over 300,000 inhabitants characterized by the textile industry, and a lack of wide streets, ring roads or a reliable public transport system. All passenger and freight traffic was concentrated in the city center, especially on Piotrkowska Street. Up to one thousand cabs and carriages drove around the city centre. Both the city government and local industrialists wanted to provide a solution to this situation, and therefore took up the construction of a tram line through the city centre. In 1883, the first attempt to build a horse tram was made, which in the end was abandoned. The project was tendered, but ultimately, never completed.

A project with electric trams was then started, which would carry passengers by day and cargo by night. The Electric Railway Consortium Lodz (KEL) won a tender for construction the line. Julius Kunitzer signed the contract in St Petersburg in front of Nicholas II on behalf of the KEL. He was backed by the German company AEG, which then started construction in the summer of 1897.

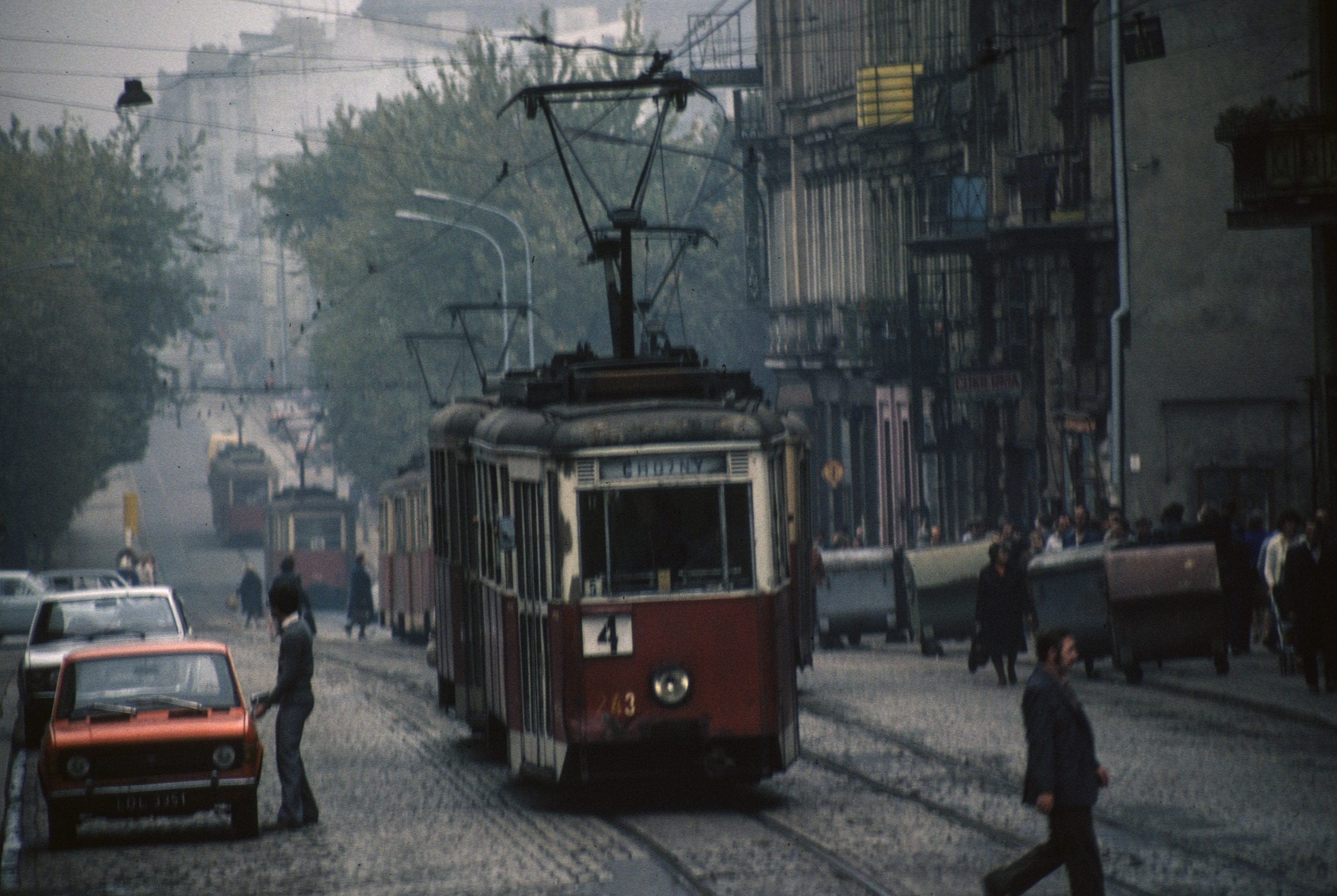
Line 4 in 1981

Trams in Łódź made their first appearance on 23 December 1898. Łódź was the first city to have electric trams in what was then Congress Poland. Initially, there were two fairly short tram lines that both served the city centre area; by February 1899 their number was doubled. In 1901, the first suburban tram lines started – the Pabianice and Zgierz lines. Both of these initiatives were the result of the activities of private companies in which German manufacturers dominated.

The experiment with electric trams in Łódź fared even better than expected. Trams quickly paid off the cost of line construction, and the project brought considerable profits to its shareholders, whereas traffic in the center of the city decreased. Between 1910 and 1931, suburban tram lines connected many important places around the city. In the first half of the 1990s, some of those lines were closed down.

After World War II, the network of suburban and urban trams was nationalized and transferred to the Miejskie Przedsiębiorstwo Komunikacyjne – Łódź (MPK Łódź), which, as the city expanded, expanded the number and length of both urban and suburban lines. Currently MPK operates 18 urban and 5 regional (or suburban) lines. The longest of these is number 46, which has a length of 38 kilometres (24 mi) and is the longest tram line in Poland.

While Łódź is acknowledged to be the first city in Poland to have a fully electrified tram system, it is less well known that unusually Łódź once boasted a small cemetery where tram drivers were buried. Sadly, nothing remains of this graveyard, which was situated on Lindley Street near the aptly named Tram Street (ul. Tramwajowa). Today, the cemetery plot where old tram drivers would have been laid to rest is occupied by the Lodz University Press and a language school.

In 2008, a teenager, described by his teachers as an "electronic genius", was arrested after using a remote control device he had assembled to cause several derailments and other accidents in the Łódź tramway system.

== Lines ==
Łódź tramway network Legend: existing routes, dismantled routes

There are 24 lines on the network; 1 line is currently not in operation (as of August 2026).

Lines are divided into colours based on their routes.

Color	Route
1	Kilińskiego street
10A	The east-west route
11	Łódź Regional Tram (ŁTR) route
17	Politechniki street
18	New City Centre (Narutowicza street)
41	Suburban lines
~~46~~	Suspended lines

Tram	Line	Stops	Notes
1	Dw. Łódź Chojny↔ Doły	23/22	
2	Dw. Łódź Dąbrowa ↔ Kochanówka	35	
3	Widzew Augustów ↔ R. Powstańców 1863r.	36/35	
4	Dw. Łódź Dąbrowa ↔ Helenówek	36/37	
5	Teofilów ↔ Chojny Kurczaki	37/35	
6	Chojny Kurczaki ↔ Doły	26	
7	Cm. Zarzew ↔ Cm. Ogrodowa	24/23	Temporary stub terminus at Cm. Ogrodowa.
8	Cm. Zarzew ↔ Teofilów	33/34	
9	Olechów ↔ Dw. Łódź Fabryczna	22	Runs on a part of the E-W route, and on Kopcińskiego & Narutowicza streets.
10A	Widzew Augustów ↔ Retkinia	25	
10B	Olechów ↔ Retkinia	32	
11	Chocianowice IKEA ↔ Helenówek	38	
12	Stoki ↔ Retkinia	29/30	Stops at Stoki loop in Retkinia direction.
13	Dąbrowa Niższa ↔ Teofilów	28/29	
14	Dw. Łódź Dąbrowa ↔ Karolew (Retkinia)	20/25	Extended to Retkinia on weekends and holidays, ends at Karolew otherwise.
15	Chojny Kurczaki ↔ Stoki	35/36	
16	pl. Niepodległości ↔ Kochanówka	27	Runs along Politechniki, and Włókniarzy streets.
17	Chocianowice Ikea ↔ Telefoniczna Zajezdnia	33/34	
18	Retkinia ↔ Telefoniczna Zajezdnia	26	Runs on weekdays only.
19	Helenówek-Pętla ↔ Chojny Kurczaki	36	Runs on weekdays only.
41	Pl. Niepodległości ↔ Pabianice Wiejska	30	
43	Włókniarzy/Legionów ↔ Konstantynów Łódzki Plac Wolności	17	Main article: Trams in Konstantynów Łódzki Temporary stub terminus at Włókniarzy/Legionów
45	Telefoniczna Zajezdnia ↔ Zgierz Plac Kilińskiego	31/32	
~~46~~	~~Stoki ↔ Ozorków Cegielniana~~	~~55~~	Main article: Trams in Ozorków Suspended in 2018 due to bad condition of the tracks. Currently no plans of rebuilding the line.

== Types of vehicles ==
The following table shows the vehicles used for tram communication in Łódź (as at 19 November 2025).

A tram on Nowomiejska street

Tramway type	Number		Picture
Moderus Gamma LF 06 AC	30	Wheelchair symbol	
Pesa Swing 122NaL	34	Wheelchair symbol	
PESA Tramicus 122N	10	Wheelchair symbol	
Bombardier Cityrunner	15	Wheelchair symbol	
Düwag M8CN	18	Wheelchair symbol	
Konstal 805N-ML Woltan	62		
Konstal 805Na ND	130		
Konstal 805Na	6		
Düewag MGT6D	34	Wheelchair symbol	
AEG/Adtranz GT6M-ZR	14	Wheelchair symbol	
total	353		
