= Dalke =

River in Germany

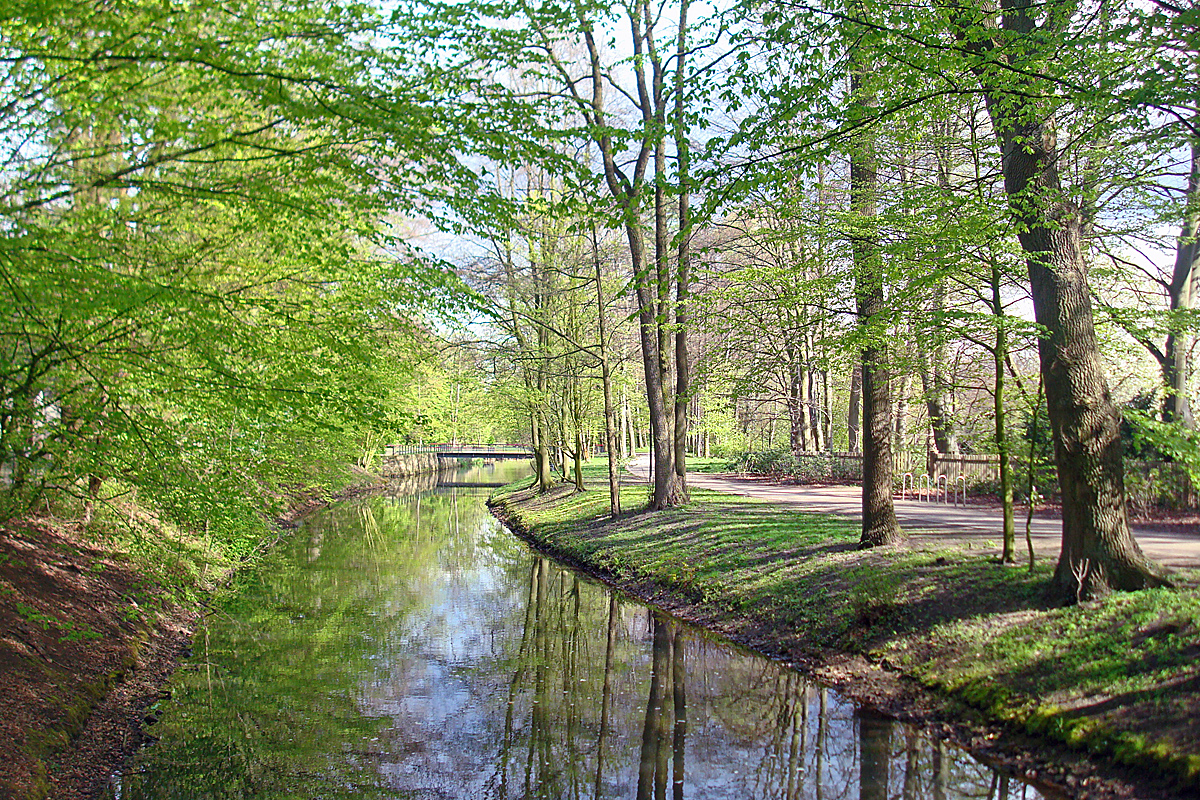
- Stadtpark Gütersloh

Location
- Country: Germany
- State: North Rhine-Westphalia

Physical characteristics
- Source
  - location: Bielefeld-Sennestadt
  - elevation: 138 m (453 ft)
- Mouth
  - location: Ems near Gütersloh
  - coordinates: 51°54′35″N 8°18′48″E
  - elevation: 64 m (210 ft)
- Length: 24.0 km (14.9 mi)
- Basin size: 245.6 km^{2} (94.8 sq mi)

Basin features
- Progression: Ems→ North Sea
- Tributaries
  - left: Wapelbach, Menkebach, Sprungbach, Strothbach
  - right: Hasselbach, Bekelbach

Dalke (also: Dalkebach) is a river of North Rhine-Westphalia, Germany. It flows into the Ems near Gütersloh.

== See also ==
- List of rivers of North Rhine-Westphalia
