= Hövelhof =

- Municipality
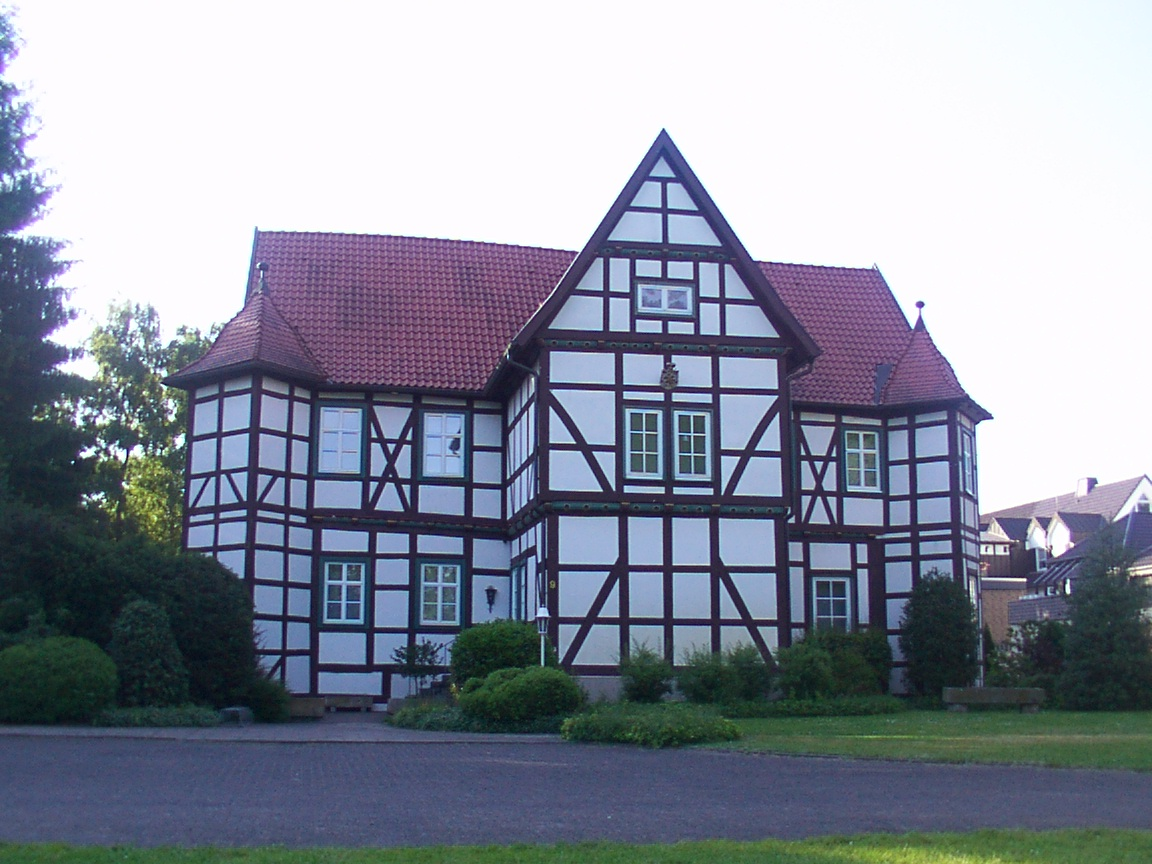
- Former hunting lodge of the Paderborn prince bishops

- Coat of arms

- Location of Hövelhof within Paderborn district
- Interactive map of Hövelhof
- Location within Germany Location within North Rhine-Westphalia
- Coordinates: 51°49′N 08°39′E
- Country: Germany
- State: North Rhine-Westphalia
- Admin. region: Detmold
- District: Paderborn
- Subdivisions: 5

Government
  - Mayor (2020–25): Michael Berens (CDU)

Area
  - Total: 70.74 km^{2} (27.31 sq mi)
- Elevation: 106 m (348 ft)

Population (2025-12-31)
  - Total: 16,799
  - Density: 237.5/km^{2} (615.1/sq mi)
- Time zone: UTC+01:00 (CET)
  - Summer (DST): UTC+02:00 (CEST)
- Postal codes: 33155–33161
- Dialling codes: 05257; 05294 Hövelhof-Espeln
- Vehicle registration: PB
- Website: www.hoevelhof.de

Hövelhof (German pronunciation: [ˈhøːvl̩ˌhoːf]) is a municipality in the district Paderborn, in North Rhine-Westphalia, Germany. Since 14 March 2012, Hövelhof can use the official prefix Sennegemeinde (English: "Senne municipality").

== Geography ==
Hövelhof is located in the Senne area, the eastern part of the Westfälische Bucht, approx. 10 km northwest of Paderborn. The eastern side of Hövelhof belongs to the Military Training Area Senne.

The municipality is rich of rivers. The Ems, whose springs are adjacent to the north in Stukenbrock, is the largest river that flows through Hövelhof. Smaller rivers are the Haustenbach, the Knochenbach, the Krollbach, the Schwarzwasserbach, the Furlbach, the Holtebach, and the Hallerbach. Hövelhof features a rare river situation: at the Krollbach bifurcation, the Krollbach separates into two rivers that lead to different streams.

=== Neighbouring municipalities ===
- Augustdorf
- Bad Lippspringe
- Delbrück
- Schloß Holte-Stukenbrock
- Verl

=== Division of the municipality ===
- Klausheide
- Staumühle
- Espeln
- Riege
- Hövelriege
- Hövelsenne (mostly vacated)

== Description ==
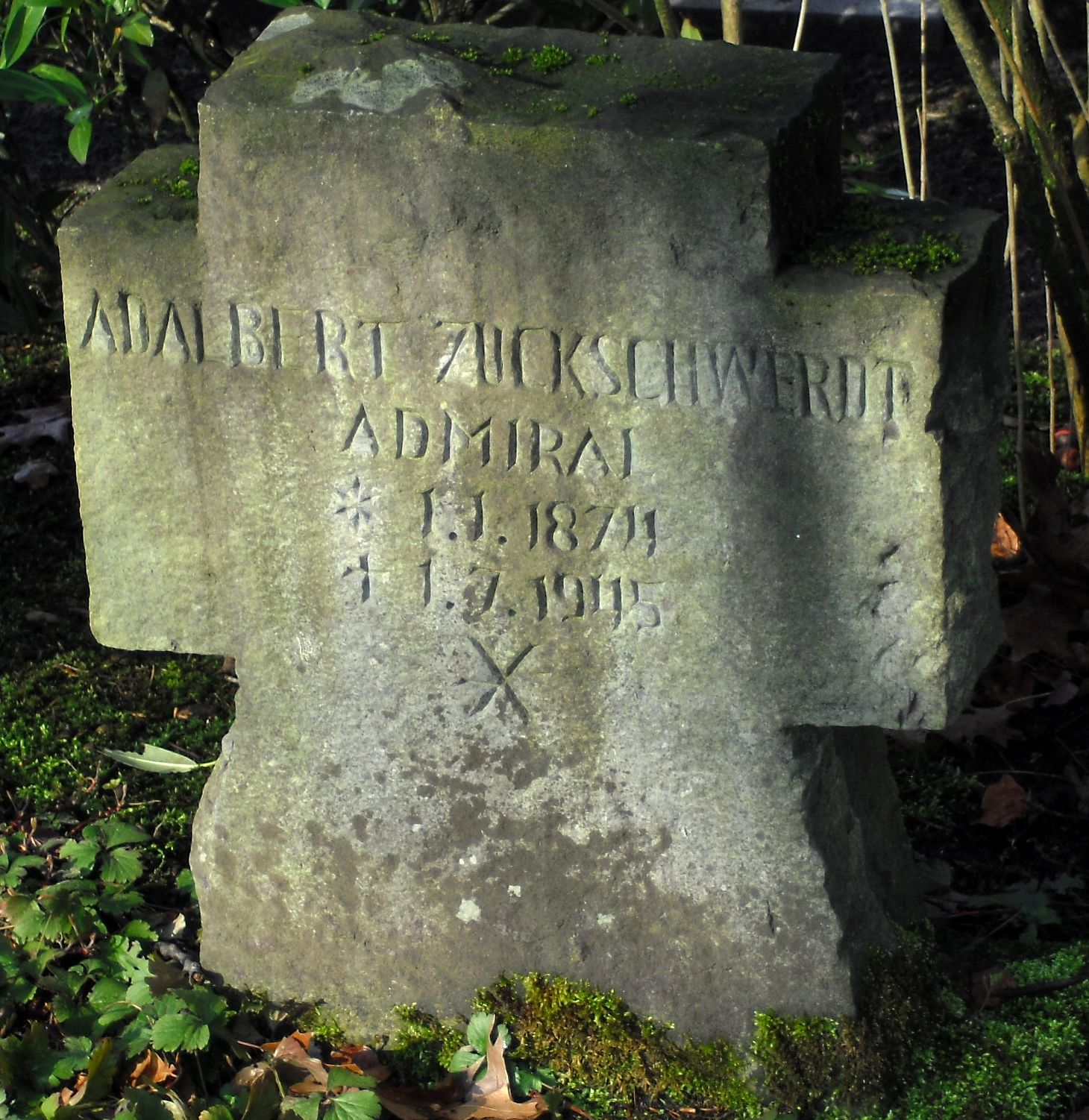
Adalbert Zuckschwerdt's grave in the area of the former British POW-camp Internierungslager Staumühle near Hövelhof.

Unusually for a village as small as Hövelhof, it is relatively self-contained—there are numerous supermarkets, restaurants, clothes shops, travel agencies, pubs and much more, meaning that the village could theoretically remain independent of the city of Paderborn. In fact, the only common feature of a full-fledged town that is missing from Hövelhof is a cinema, for which inhabitants do indeed need to venture into Paderborn City Center—approximately 15 km (10 mi) away. It also has five schools, its own fire brigade, and a library.

== History ==
The name of the municipality is derived from the name of the Hövelhof, a grange that was founded around the year 1000. The first official documentation of its name was in 1446. About 200 years later, in 1645, the last owner died childless. Thus, the Hövelhof fell into the ownership of the local sovereign, the prince-bishop of Paderborn. Close to the farm, the hunting lodge was built in 1661; at the beginning of the 18th century, the first church was erect.

== Population ==
Historical population

Year	Pop.	±% p.a.
1965	9,592	—
1970	10,591	+2.00%
1975	11,436	+1.55%
1980	12,126	+1.18%
1985	12,516	+0.64%
1990	13,346	+1.29%
1995	15,167	+2.59%

Year	Pop.	±% p.a.
2000	15,773	+0.79%
2005	16,020	+0.31%
2010	15,980	−0.05%
2015	16,080	+0.12%
2020	16,222	+0.18%
2025	16,799	+0.70%

Source: Landesdatabank Nordrhein-Westfalen

== Culture ==
Hövelhof has two main festivals during the year. The first is the Schützenfest, a celebration of the St. Hubertus Hunters' Guild, which takes place on the hunting grounds. The second is the Hövelmarkt, a general village fair with not only market stalls, but also fairground rides and traditional German dances, complete with traditional music and costume.

== Infrastructure ==
=== Education ===
Hövelhof has ten kindergartens and four schools—two primary and two secondary schools.

== Politics ==
The local government is dominated by the conservative CDU.

=== Coat of arms, seal, and banner ===
The coat of arms of Hövelhof shows historical and geographical symbols:

1. The cross in the top field represented the bishop cross from the prince-bishops of Paderborn, who were the sovereigns since the Middle Ages up to 1803.
2. The wave line symbolises the brooks and rivers, especially the river Ems.
3. The hunting horn stands for the hunting castle, build by the prince-bishop Dietrich Adolf von der Recke in the year 1661.
4. The green color stands for the wealth of forest and green areas.

The seal contains the coat of arms with the transcription Gemeinde Hövelhof Krs. Paderborn. The banner is striped lengthways with green and white and has the coat of arms in the upper third.

== Notable persons ==
- Heinz Stücke, world traveler and cyclist

== Twin town ==
Hövelhof has a partnership with the French city Verrières-le-Buisson since 29 May 1971. The partnership consists of yearly meetups in either one of the two cities, student exchanges, and more. Hövelhof has also named a small park with a pond after Verrières-le-Buisson. Also a Twin town since December 2025, the nice little Catalan place of l' ametlla del Vallès on de area of Vallès Oriental.
