= Hallerbach (Holtebach) =

River in Germany

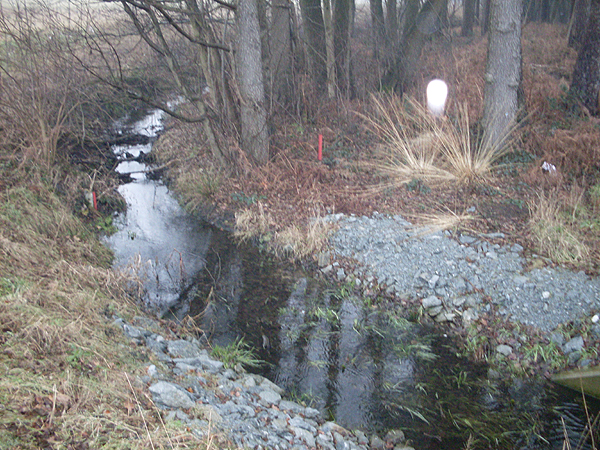

Location
- Country: Germany
- States: North Rhine-Westphalia

Physical characteristics
- Mouth
  - location: Holtebach
  - coordinates: 51°49′46″N 8°37′51″E

Basin features
- Progression: Holtebach→ Schwarzwasserbach→ Ems→ North Sea

Hallerbach is a small river of North Rhine-Westphalia, Germany. It flows into the Holtebach near Hövelhof.

== See also ==
- List of rivers of North Rhine-Westphalia
