= Schwarzwasserbach =

Schwarzwasserbach may refer to:

- Schwarzwasserbach (Ems), a river of North Rhine-Westphalia, Germany, tributary of the Ems
- Schwarzwasserbach, a river of Tyrol, Austria, via the river Sieglseebach the drain of the Sieglsees
