= Schwarzer Graben =

Schwarzer Graben may refer to:

- Schwarzer Graben (Elbe), a river of Saxony, Germany, tributary of the Elbe
- Schwarzer Graben (Glenne), a river of North Rhine-Westphalia, Germany, tributary of the Glenne
