= Artega GT =

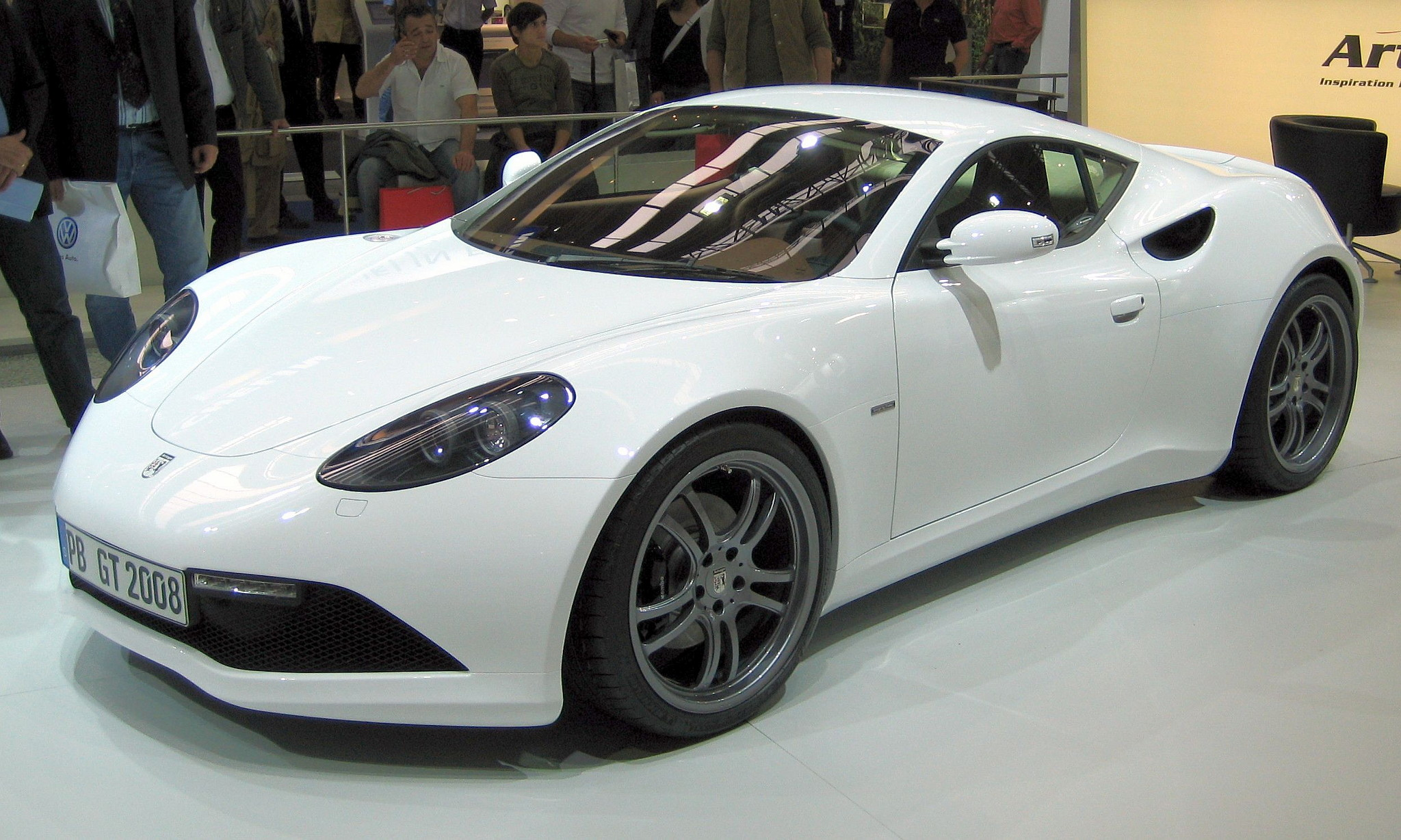

Overview
- Manufacturer: Artega
- Production: 2010–2012 (153 units)
- Assembly: Germany: Delbrück
- Designer: Henrik Fisker

Body and chassis
- Class: Sports car (S)
- Body style: 2-door Coupé
- Layout: Transverse rear mid-engine, rear-wheel-drive
- Related: Saleen S1; Melkus RS 2000

Powertrain
- Engine: 3.6 L Volkswagen VR6
- Transmission: 6-speed direct-shift automatic

Dimensions
- Wheelbase: 2,460 mm (96.9 in)
- Length: 4,010 mm (157.9 in)
- Width: 1,880 mm (74.0 in)
- Height: 1,180 mm (46.5 in)
- Kerb weight: 1,116 kg (2,460 lb)

Chronology
- Successor: Artega Scalo

The Artega GT is a mid-engined, rear wheel drive setted 2-seat sports car produced by German automobile manufacturer Artega between 2010 and 2012. The GT was Artega's first model. A total of 153 units were produced.

== Overview ==
The two seater had an aluminum space frame and carbon fibre reinforced body for a light curb weight of 1,116 kg (2,460 lb). The engine was a Volkswagen-sourced direct injection 3.6 L VR6 rated at 296 bhp (221 kW; 300 PS) and 350 N⋅m (260 lb⋅ft) mated to a 6-speed DSG transmission. Acceleration from 0–100 km/h is tested to be at 4.6 seconds, with top speed estimated to be over 270 km/h (168 mph).

In early 2011 GTspirit tested the Artega GT in Belgium and finished by saying that, Overall a superb handling sports car with not a single failure and that it had excellent performance not easily found elsewhere''. The Artega GT was priced at approximately €75,000.

The GT was built at a new factory in Delbrück, Germany with production starting in October 2008 and sales commencing in late 2009/early 2010. Production was "claimed to be limited to roughly 500 units per year".

== History ==
First shown as a mock up at the 2007 Geneva Auto Show; the Artega GT debuted a year later at the 2008 Geneva Auto Show. Klaus Dieter Frers announced at the 2008 Detroit Auto Show that Artega was investing in a possible solar-powered concept vehicle to compete with the Tesla Roadster (2008) and Fisker Karma. Henrik Fisker, who also designed the Aston Martin V8 Vantage, contributed to the design of the Artega GT. The first produced Artega GT was reportedly sold to Steven Gregory Balboa, an Italian now residing in Rochester, New York.

=== Bankruptcy ===
After the Artega company filed for bankruptcy in July 2012, production has ceased and the company has been bought by German automotive supplier firm Paragon AG, which has offered all employees new jobs. Paragon AG will continue to supply owners with service, according to the Artega-website.

=== Discontinuation ===
On 30 September 2012 the production of the Artega GT was halted. There are currently no plans to resume production.

== Technical specification ==
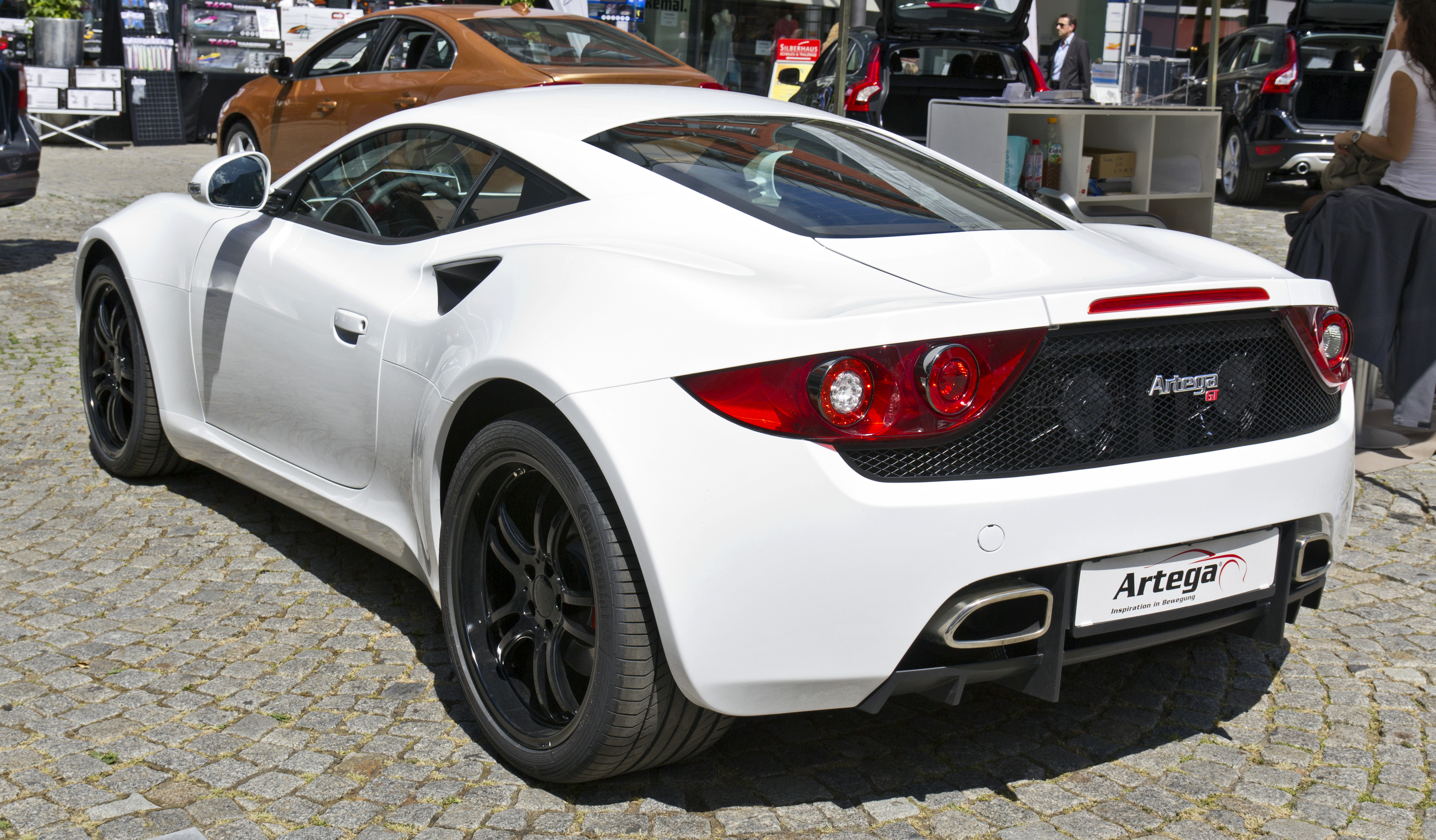

Frame: Aluminum spaceframe. Rear module tubular space frame of high-tensile stainless steel

Bodywork: Carbon fiber reinforced polyurethane compound material

Dimensions (L X B X H): 3950 x 1880 x 1,180 mm (46.5 in)

Kg/PS: About 3.6 kg/PS

Engine: VR6 direct-injection engine in the rear mid

Displacement: 3,597 cc (3.6 L; 219.5 cu in)

Performance: 221 kW (300 PS; 296 hp) at 6,600 rpm

Torque: 350 N⋅m (260 lb⋅ft) at 2,400 rpm

Layout: Rear-wheel-drive

Transmission: Six-speed direct-shift with Artega inverting stage (pat. appl.)

Acceleration 0 - 100 km/h (62 mph): 4.6 seconds

Speed: more than 273 km/h (170 mph)

https://www.auto-motor-und-sport.de/test/artega-gt-im-supertest-wie-schlaegt-sich-der-deutsche-lotus/technische-daten/

== See also ==
- Oullim Spirra
- DC Avanti
- Mastretta MXT
