= Artega Automobile =

German automobile manufacturer

Artega Automobil GmbH & Co. KG
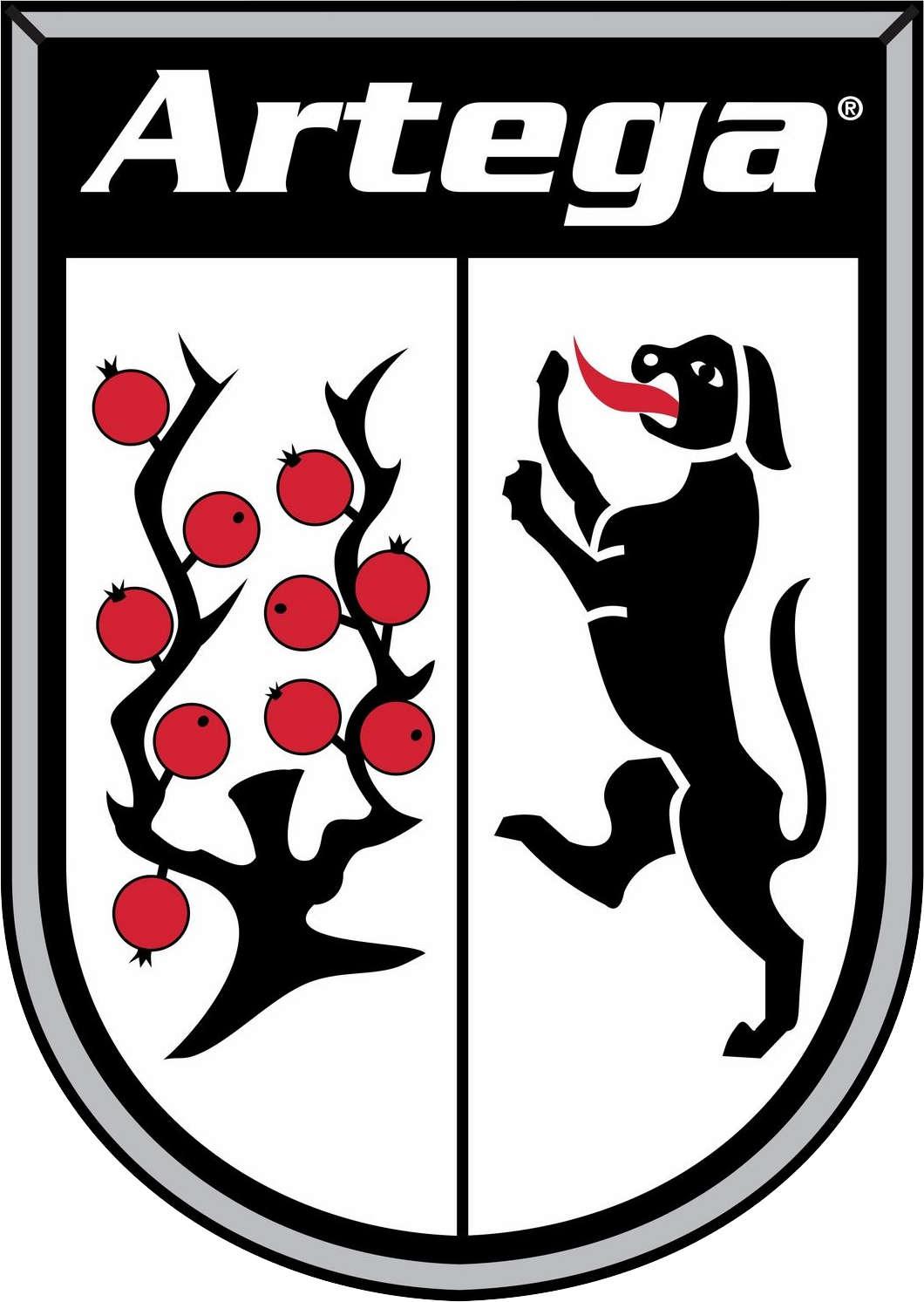
- Type: GmbH & Co. KG
- Industry: Automotive
- Founded: 2006; 20 years ago
- Founder: Klaus Dieter Frers
- Defunct: 2022
- Fate: Acquired by automotive maker ElectricBrands
- Headquarters: Delbrück, Paderborn (district), Germany
- Area served: Worldwide
- Key people: Peter Müller (CEO)
- Products: Sports cars
- Number of employees: 50 (2010)
- Parent: Paragon AG
- Website: www.artega.de

Artega Automobil GmbH & Co. KG was a German sports car manufacturer, based in Delbrück, Germany. It was founded by Klaus Dieter Frers in 2006. The company's first product was a mid-engined sports coupé released in 2007. In early 2010, a private equity and venture capital firm that already held a stake in Artega took full control. Artega filed for bankruptcy in July 2012. It was reacquired by a company under Frers's control that same year and eventually resumed production, specializing in electric vehicles. In 2022, the German electric vehicle company ElectricBrands acquired Artega, marking the end of the brand.

== Company ==
Artega was founded by Klaus Dieter Frers, a mechanical engineer who worked for AEG-Telefunken before moving to Nixdorf Computer to oversee their production facilities from 1983 to 1987. Frers established a company called paragon electronics GmbH in 1988, and another called paragon AG in 1999, into which paragon electronic GmbH was merged. paragon AG specialises in electronic modules, controls and display systems for the automotive industry. Frers is also one of the principals of Voltabox Deutschland GmbH, as well as a car collector and competitor in historic racing.

Frers founded Artega Automobil in 2006. The name of the company was suggested by Manfred Gotta, a German brand-development expert. The company previewed their first sports car, the Artega GT, at the 2007 Frankfurt Auto Show as an engineless prototype. A production-ready version appeared at the Geneva Auto Show one year later, labelled the Intro 2008 special edition. Production of the car started in 2009.

In interviews in 2008, chief adviser Karl-Heinz Kalbfell indicated that the next models anticipated were a soft-top version and a 4-cylinder car.

On 25 January 2010, Mexican investment firm Tresalia Capital assumed control of Artega. At a later date there was a change in management, with Frers leaving the company and Dr.-Ing. Wolfgang Ziebart, former Head of Continental AG and Infineon AG, becoming CEO of Artega.

In March 2011, Artega unveiled an electric version of the GT called the Artega SE (for Sports Electric).

A Targa variant of the GT with a glass roof was shown at the Geneva Auto Show in March 2012. In July of the same year the company filed for bankruptcy protection, and what was expected to be the final GT built rolled off the production line in September.

On 1 October 2012, Paragon AG assumed control of Artega. This put Frers once again in charge of the car company. The decision was described as an acquisition of Artega's technology, staff and other assets, with no plan to restart automobile production.

At the 2015 International Motor Show in Frankfurt Artega showed two new products; the Scalo, a fully electric sports coupé, and the Karo, an ATV-like vehicle that was also electric.

In 2017, Artega brought the new Scalo Superelletra three-seat coupé to the Geneva Auto Show.

In December 2018, Artega announced the acquisition of the production rights for the Swiss electric car Microlino.

In 2022, the German electric vehicle firm ElectricBrands acquired Artega with the goal of starting production of the Karo-Isetta (now renamed the Evetta) in the next year. Instead, the brand never was able to bring its own vehicle, the XBUS, or the Evetta to market after it filed for insolvency in 2024.

== Models ==
=== GT ===
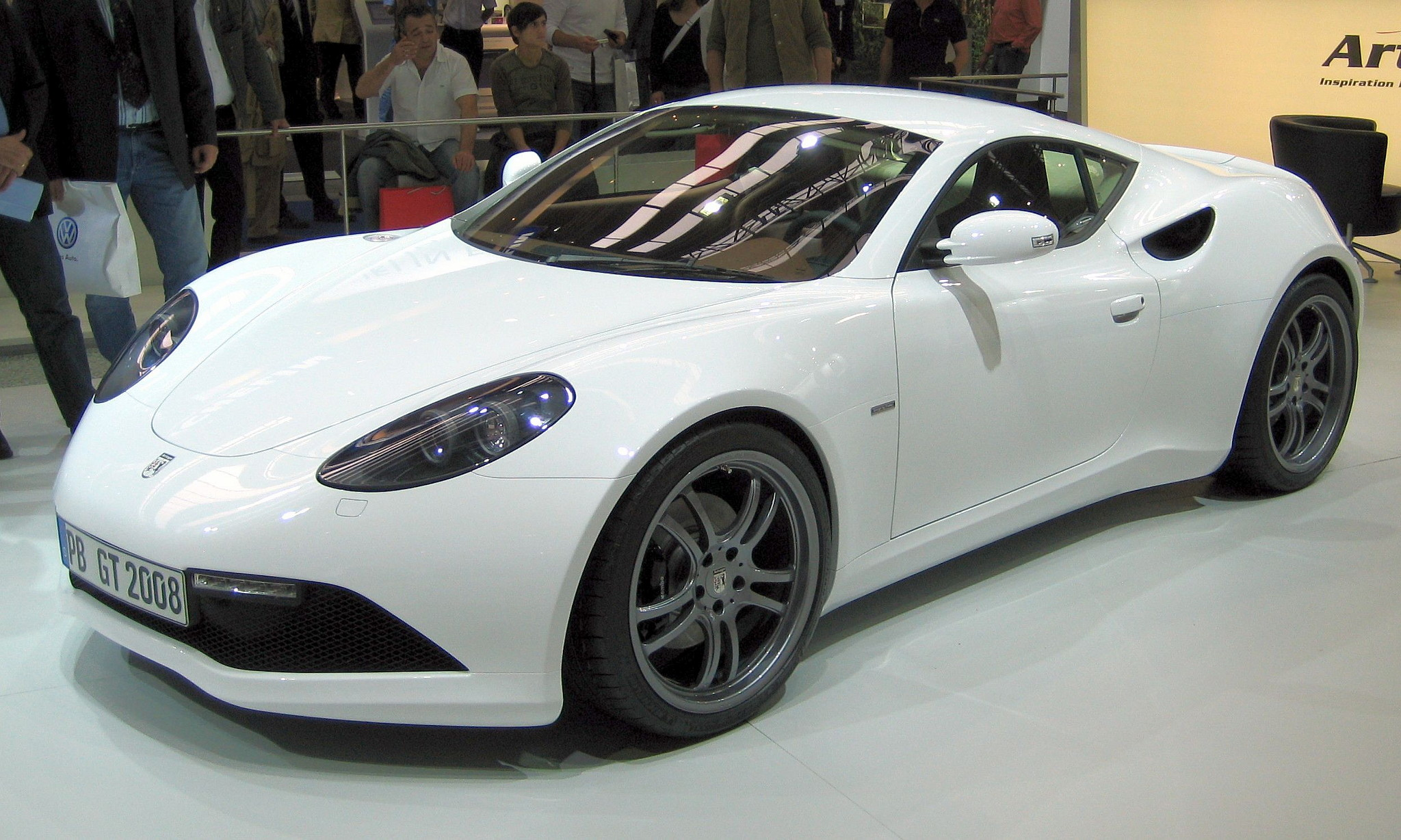
Artega GT

The Artega GT was a two-seat hardtop coupé with a rear mid-engine, rear-wheel-drive layout. The car was built on an aluminum space-frame chassis, with carbon-fibre-reinforced bodywork. Suspension front and rear was by unequal-length upper and lower A-arms with coil-over dampers. Mechanical design was handled by Hardy Essig, formerly the technical designer for Porsche. Henrik Fisker, who had designed the Aston Martin DB9, styled the car.

Power came from a 3,598 cc (220 cu in) direct-injection version of Volkswagen's VR6 engine. In the GT this engine was mounted transversely behind the driver and produced 300 hp (223.7 kW). Maximum torque of 350 N⋅m (260 lb⋅ft) was produced at 2400 rpm. Power went to the rear wheels through a 6-speed Volkswagen DSG transaxle. The Artega GT weighed 1,100 kg (2,425 lb) without passengers. Artega claimed that the GT could accelerate from 0–100 km/h (0.0–62.1 mph) in less than 5 seconds and had a top speed of more than 270 km/h (168 mph). In Germany the Artega GT was priced at €74,948 or $104,000 with taxes.

=== SE ===
The Artega SE was an all-electric battery-powered, short-lived version of the GT, using the same aluminum space frame and basic bodywork, but was powered by a pair of electric motors producing a combined 280 kW (375.5 hp). On-board energy storage was a water-cooled battery pack that weighed 310 kg (683.4 lb) and stored 37 kWh (133.2 MJ) at 350 Volts. At 1,400 kg (3,086.5 lb), the SE weighed more than the GT, but had slightly greater acceleration. The car's range was estimated to be 200–300 km (124–186 mi), depending on driving style. Artega said that the price would be €150,000 (approx. US$212,500).

=== Scalo ===
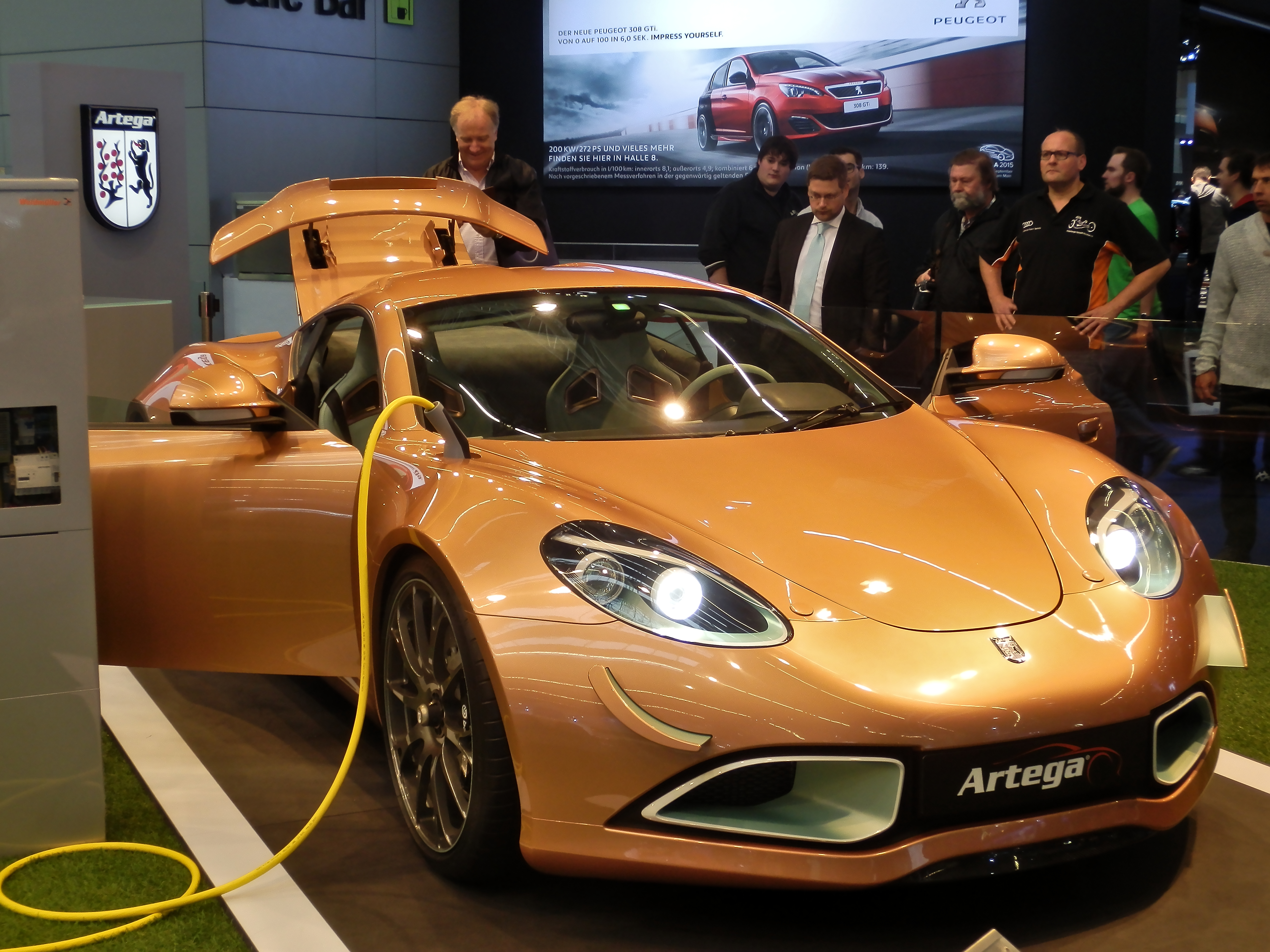
Artega Scalo

The Scalo first appeared at the 2015 Frankfurt Auto Show. A refined version of the SE, the Scalo was considered the successor to the GT by Artega. Power came from two Voltabox electric motors that combined to produce 300 kW (402.3 hp) and 779.6 N⋅m (575 ft⋅lb). The actively-cooled battery pack could store 37 kWh of energy at 411 volts and combined lithium-ion battery cells with supercapacitors. The name of the car was borrowed from that of a famous racehorse.

=== Karo-Isetta ===
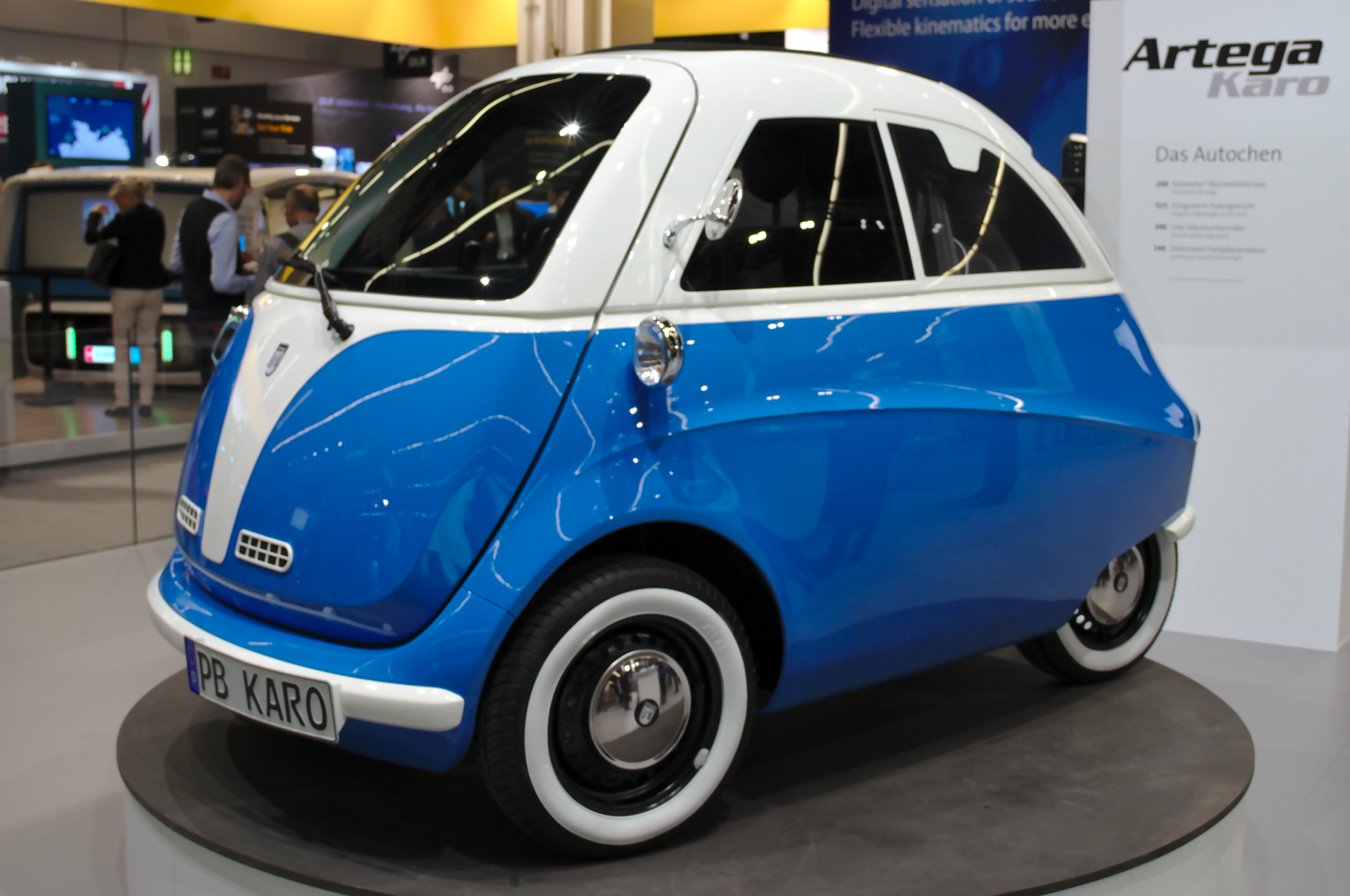
Artega Karo-Isetta

The Artega Karo-Isetta appeared as a concept called the Artega Karo at the 2015 Frankfurt Auto Show alongside the Scalo but was renamed to Artega Karo-Isetta upon production. The Karo-Isetta is a quadricycle with electric drive. Resembling a road-going ATV "Quad", the Karo can carry a driver and one passenger riding two-up style. The battery pack has a capacity of 5.3 kWh, and the vehicle is offered with three different motors with different power levels, depending on the rider's age and skill level. For the 17 kW version the 705 lb (319.8 kg) vehicle can accelerate from 0–50 mph (0.0–80.5 km/h) in 4.5 seconds. The Karo also comes with a built-in wireless cellphone charger and a detachable sound system.

=== Scalo Superelletra ===
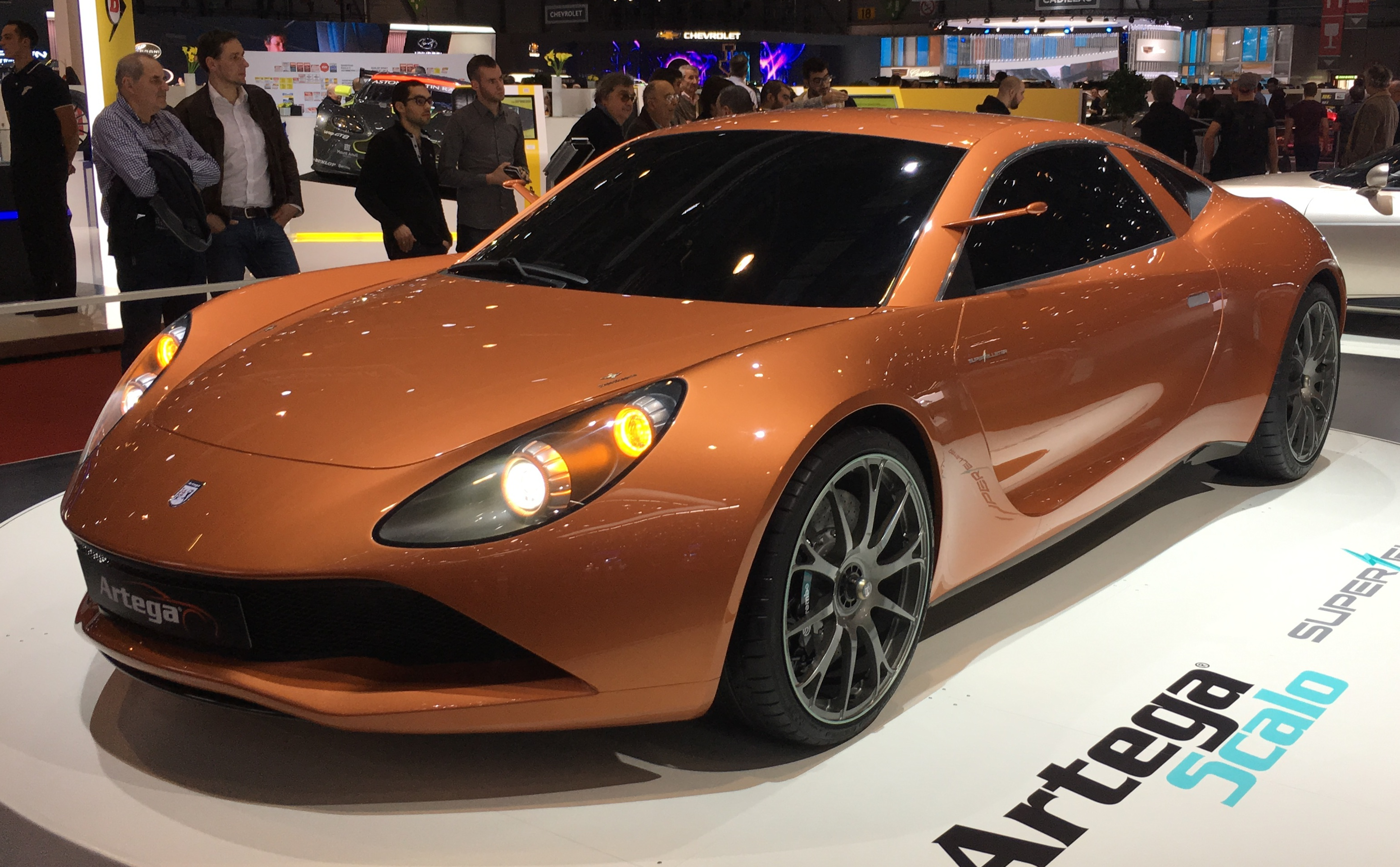
Artega Scalo Superelletra

The Scalo Superelletra debuted at the 2017 Geneva Auto Show. The car's name combines that of the earlier Scalo with a portmanteau of the Italian Superleggera and elettrica, indicating light weight and electric drive. Designed by Carrozzeria Touring Superleggera, the new car was longer than the original Scalo and featured a new carbon-fibre monocoque chassis. Motive power is still electric, with a quartet of motors, one at each wheel, capable of producing a total of 760.6 kW (1,020 hp). The car is to carry the driver and two passengers, seated three-abreast with the driver in the middle.

== Related ==
=== IISB-One ===
The IISB-One is a car that began life as an Artega GT and was modified to accept an electric drivetrain by the Fraunhofer Institute for Integrated Systems and Device Technology. The car received two electric motors to drive the rear wheels and a lithium battery pack to power them. Each motor was capable of delivering up to 80 kW (107.3 hp) to its associated wheel. The car was also a test-bed for a variety of charging systems, having three different systems on board.

== Motorsports ==
Artega's racing arm, Artega Rennsport, fielded an Artega GT prepared for racing (and relabeled GTR) at the Nürburgring in 2011.

In 2014 a one-make series called the Artega GT Cup was started.

== See also ==
- List of automobile manufacturers of Germany
