= Krollbach =

River in Germany

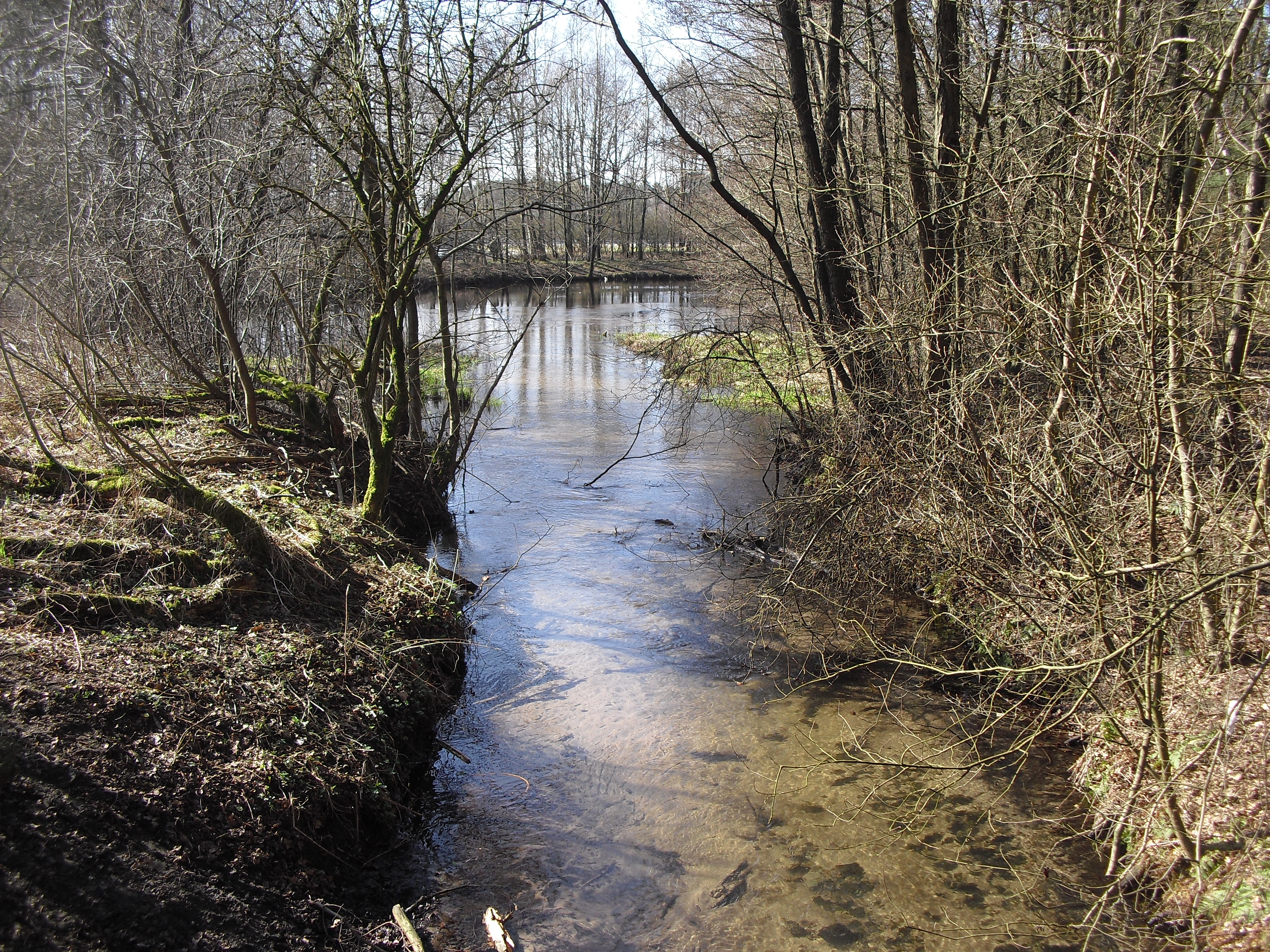

Location
- Country: Germany
- State: North Rhine-Westphalia

Physical characteristics
- Mouth
  - location: Glenne
  - coordinates: 51.7718°N 8.6165°E
- Length: 15.6 km (9.7 mi)

Basin features
- Progression: Glenne→ Lippe→ Rhine→ North Sea

Krollbach is a river of North Rhine-Westphalia, Germany. It flows into the Glenne near Delbrück.

== See also ==
- List of rivers of North Rhine-Westphalia
