= Bärenbach =

Bärenbach may refer to:

- Bärenbach, Bad Kreuznach, a municipality in the Bad Kreuznach district in Rhineland-Palatinate, Germany
- Bärenbach, Rhein-Hunsrück, a municipality in the Rhein-Hunsrück-Kreis (district) in Rhineland-Palatinate, Germany
- Bärenbach (Furlbach), the river Bärenbach of North Rhine-Westphalia, Germany
