= Bärenbach (Furlbach) =

River in Germany

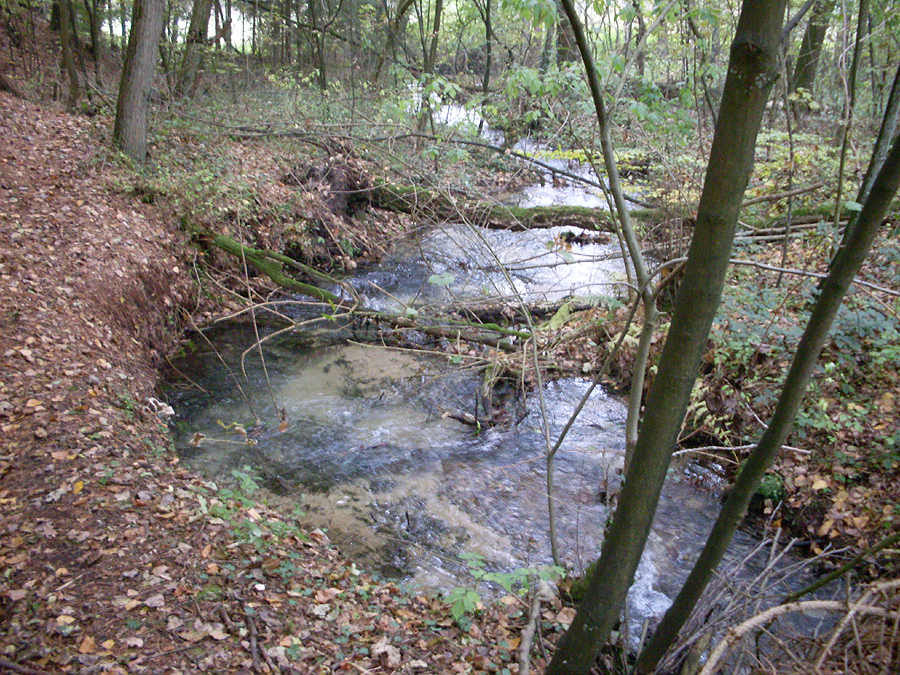

Location
- Country: Germany
- State: North Rhine-Westphalia

Physical characteristics
- Mouth
  - location: Furlbach
  - coordinates: 51.8803°N 8.6964°E

Basin features
- Progression: Furlbach→ Ems→ North Sea

Bärenbach (German pronunciation: [ˈbɛːʁənbax]) is a small river of North Rhine-Westphalia, Germany. It is 2.2 km long and flows into the Furlbach near Stukenbrock.

== See also ==
- List of rivers of North Rhine-Westphalia
