= Holtebach =

River of North Rhine-Westphalia, Germany

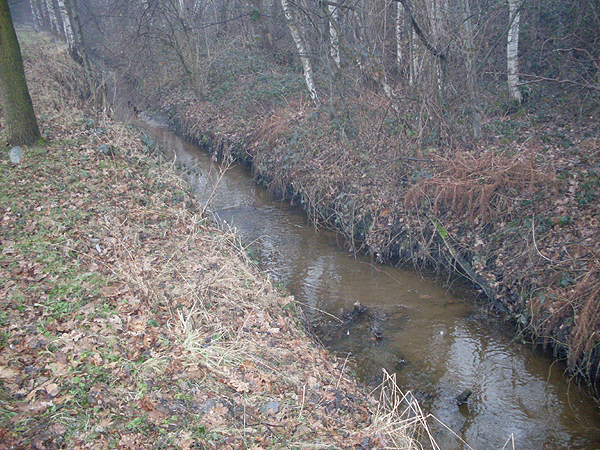

Location
- Country: Germany
- States: North Rhine-Westphalia

Physical characteristics
- Mouth
  - location: Schwarzwasserbach
  - coordinates: 51.8257°N 8.6174°E

Basin features
- Progression: Schwarzwasserbach→ Ems→ North Sea

Holtebach is a small river of North Rhine-Westphalia, Germany. It is 6.4 km long and flows into the Schwarzwasserbach near Hövelhof.

== See also ==
- List of rivers of North Rhine-Westphalia
