= Wolfgang Ziebart =

German businessman

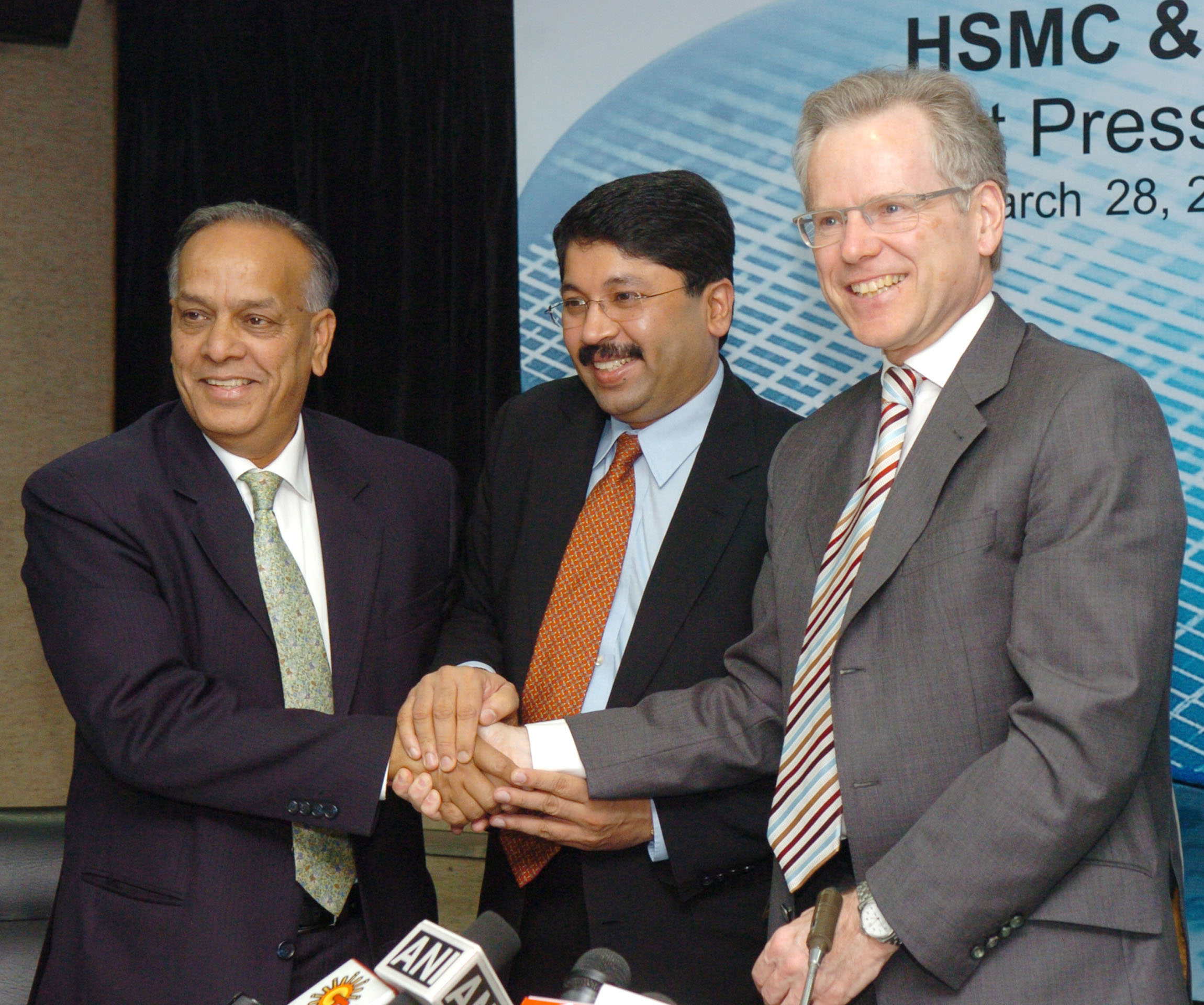
- Born: 30 January 1950 (age 76); Hannover, West Germany
- Education: Technical University of Munich
- Occupations: Automotive and electronics industry executive
- Spouse: Iris (m. 1975)
- Father: Dr Erwin Ziebart

Wolfgang Ziebart (born 30 January 1950 in Hannover) is a German automotive and electronics industry executive.

== Career ==
After receiving his Abitur, Wolfgang Ziebart studied mechanical engineering at the Technical University of Munich where he received his Diploma and PhD (Dr.-Ing.) in 1973 and 1976, respectively. Ziebart started his career in 1977 with the car manufacturer BMW. After a spell at Artega Automobile, a German electric sports car manufacturer, he joined Jaguar Land Rover as head of product development in 2013.

== Personal life ==
Ziebart has been married to his wife Iris since 1975 and is father of three children. Both of Ziebart's brothers have doctoral degrees and one of them has earned the title of professor. His father Prof. Dr.‑Ing. Erwin Ziebart, also a former CEO of an automobile supplier, died on 19 August 2007.
