= Schwarzer Graben (Glenne) =

River in Germany

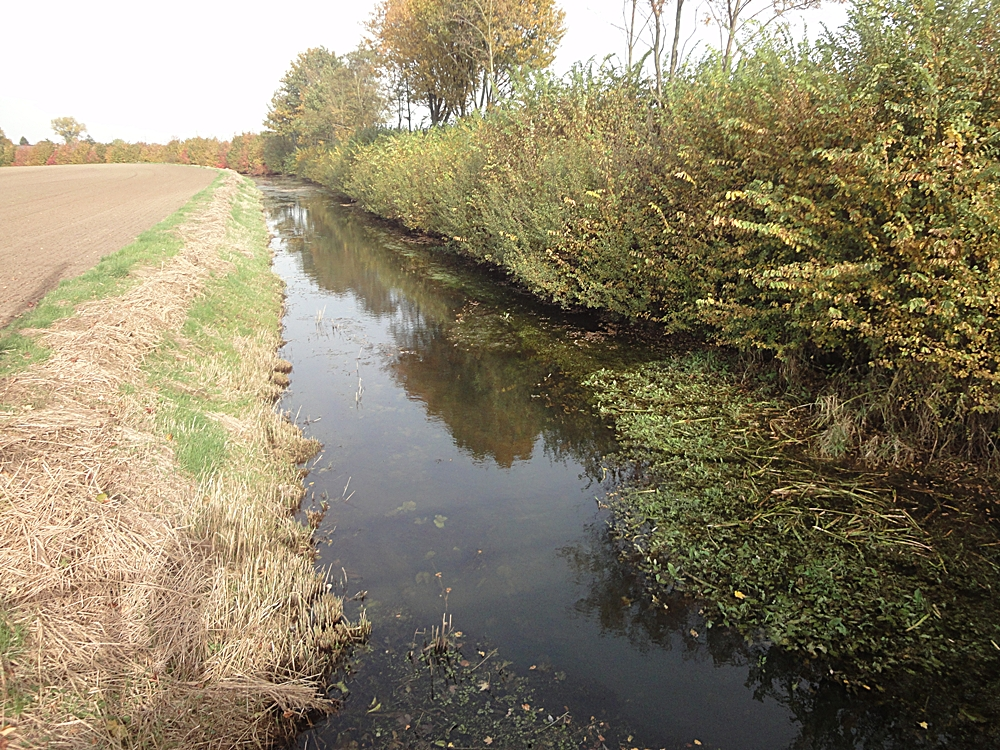

Location
- Country: Germany
- State: North Rhine-Westphalia

Physical characteristics
- Source
  - location: South of Rietberg
  - coordinates: 51.7786°N 8.4347°E
- Mouth
  - location: Southwest of Mastholte (a district of Rietberg) into the Glenne
  - coordinates: 51.7331°N 8.3432°E

Basin features
- Progression: Glenne→ Lippe→ Rhine→ North Sea

Schwarzer Graben is a river of North Rhine-Westphalia, Germany.

The Schwarzer Graben springs south of Rietberg. It discharges southwest of Mastholte, a district of Rietberg, from the right into the Glenne (which is upstream still called Haustenbach).

== See also ==
- List of rivers of North Rhine-Westphalia
