= Sieglsee =

Lake in Tyrol, Austria

Coordinates: 47°24′30″N 10°29′44″E

- Interactive map of Sieglsee
- Location: Tyrol, Austria

Sieglsee is the name of two adjacent lakes in Tyrol, Austria, the Große Sieglsee and the Kleine Sieglsee.

They are nearly circular sinkhole lakes. The Große Sieglsee (great siegl see) has a diameter of about 100 m (330 ft) and is about 30 m (98 ft) deep, the Kleine Sieglsee (small siegl see) has a diameter of about 30 m (98 ft). The lakes came into existence as collapse sinks in the Raibl Formation with sandstones, slate and rauhwacke (crystallized dolomite). The lakes drain via the river Sieglseebach into the Schwarzwasserbach. The deep and clear lakes are used for diving.
