= Furlbach =

River in Germany

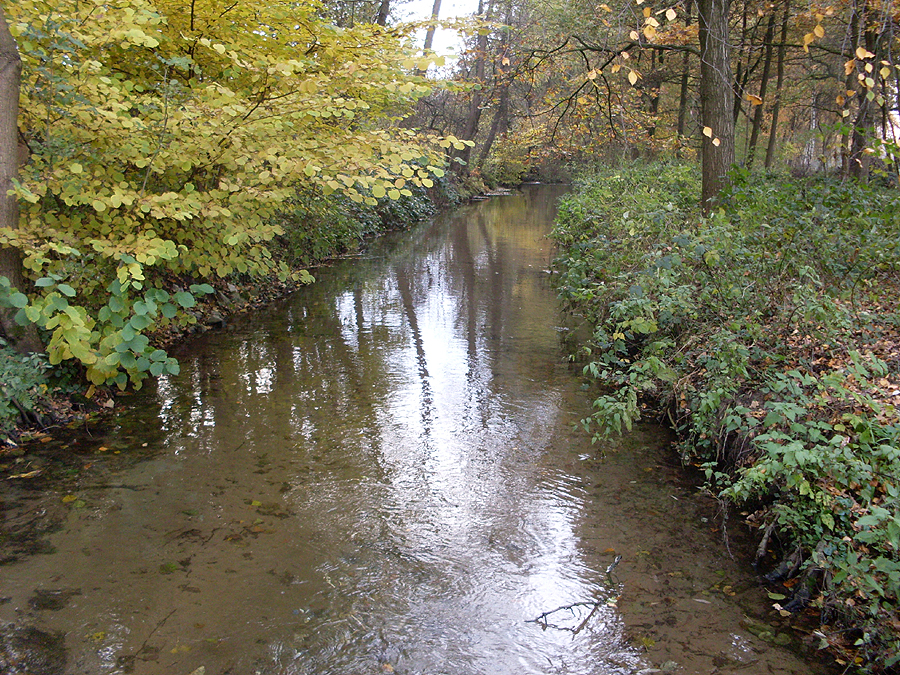

Location
- Country: Germany
- State: North Rhine-Westphalia

Physical characteristics
- Mouth
  - location: Ems
  - coordinates: 51.8322°N 8.5666°E
- Length: 14.6 km (9.1 mi)

Basin features
- Progression: Ems→ North Sea

Furlbach is a river of North Rhine-Westphalia, Germany. It flows into the Ems near Delbrück.

== See also ==
- List of rivers of North Rhine-Westphalia
