= Glenne =

River in North Rhine-Westphalia, Germany

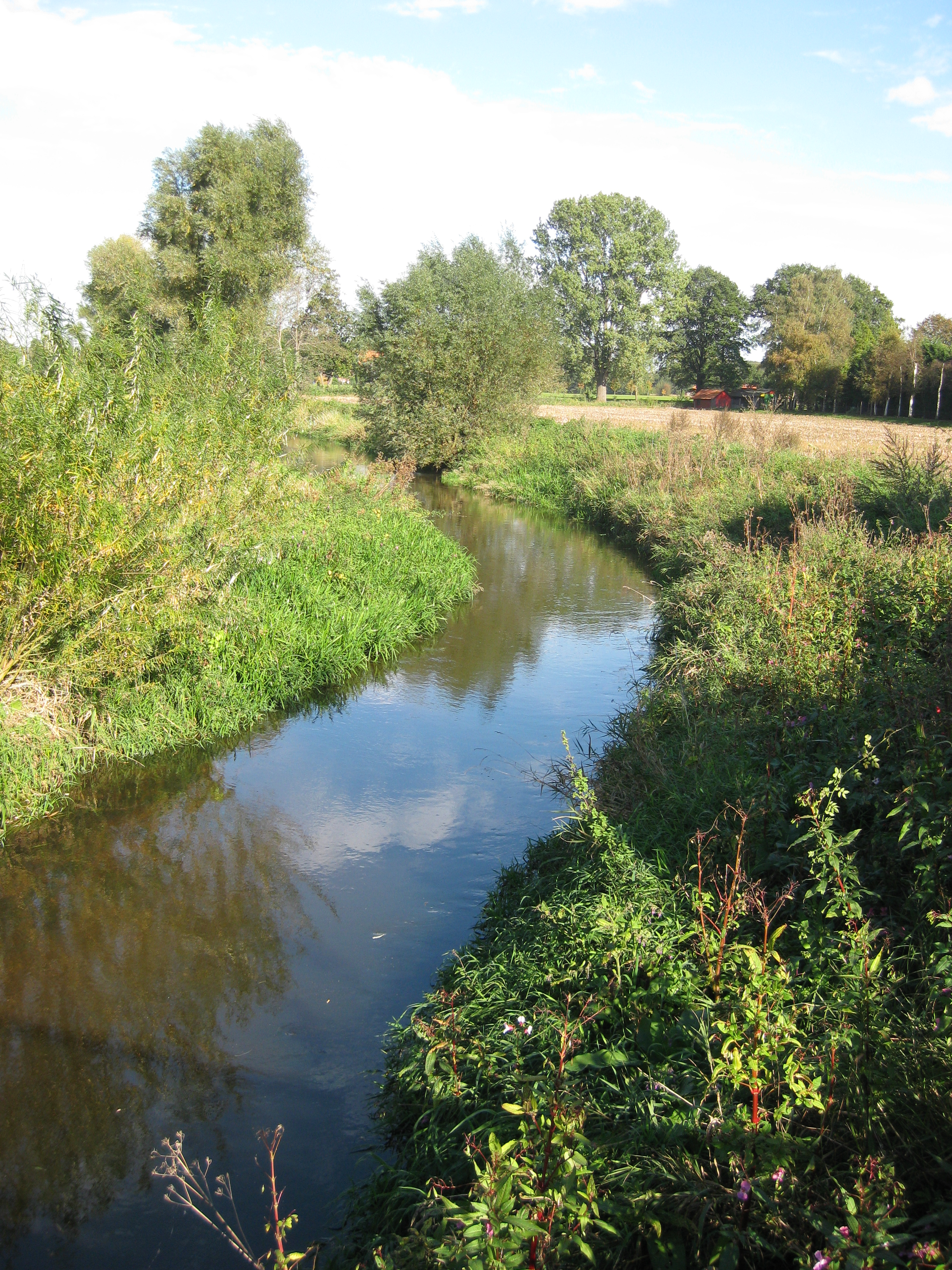

Location
- Country: Germany
- State: North Rhine-Westphalia

Physical characteristics
- Mouth
  - location: Lippe
  - coordinates: 51.6762°N 8.2935°E
- Length: 45.4 km (28.2 mi)
- Basin size: 325 km^{2} (125 sq mi)

Basin features
- Progression: Lippe→ Rhine→ North Sea

Glenne (German pronunciation: [ˈɡlɛnə]) is a river of North Rhine-Westphalia, Germany. It is a right tributary of the Lippe, which it joins near Lippstadt. Its upstream is called Haustenbach.

== See also ==
- List of rivers of North Rhine-Westphalia
