= Schwarzwasserbach (Ems) =

River in Germany

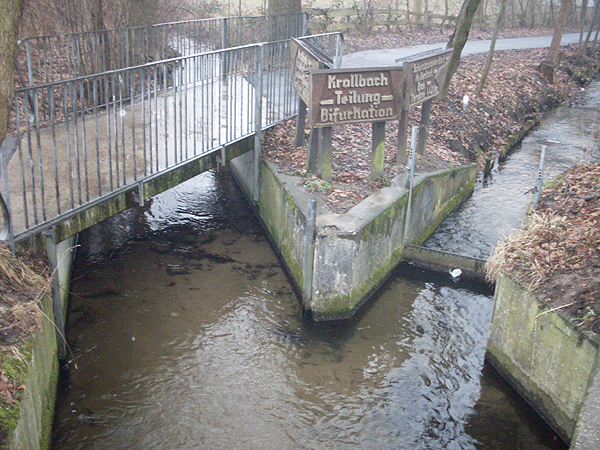

Location
- Country: Germany
- State: North Rhine-Westphalia

Physical characteristics
- Mouth
  - location: Ems
  - coordinates: 51.8299°N 8.5964°E

Basin features
- Progression: Ems→ North Sea

Schwarzwasserbach is a river of North Rhine-Westphalia, Germany. It is 6 km (3.7 mi) long and is a left tributary of the Ems near Hövelhof.

== See also ==
- List of rivers of North Rhine-Westphalia
