= Delbrück =

- Town
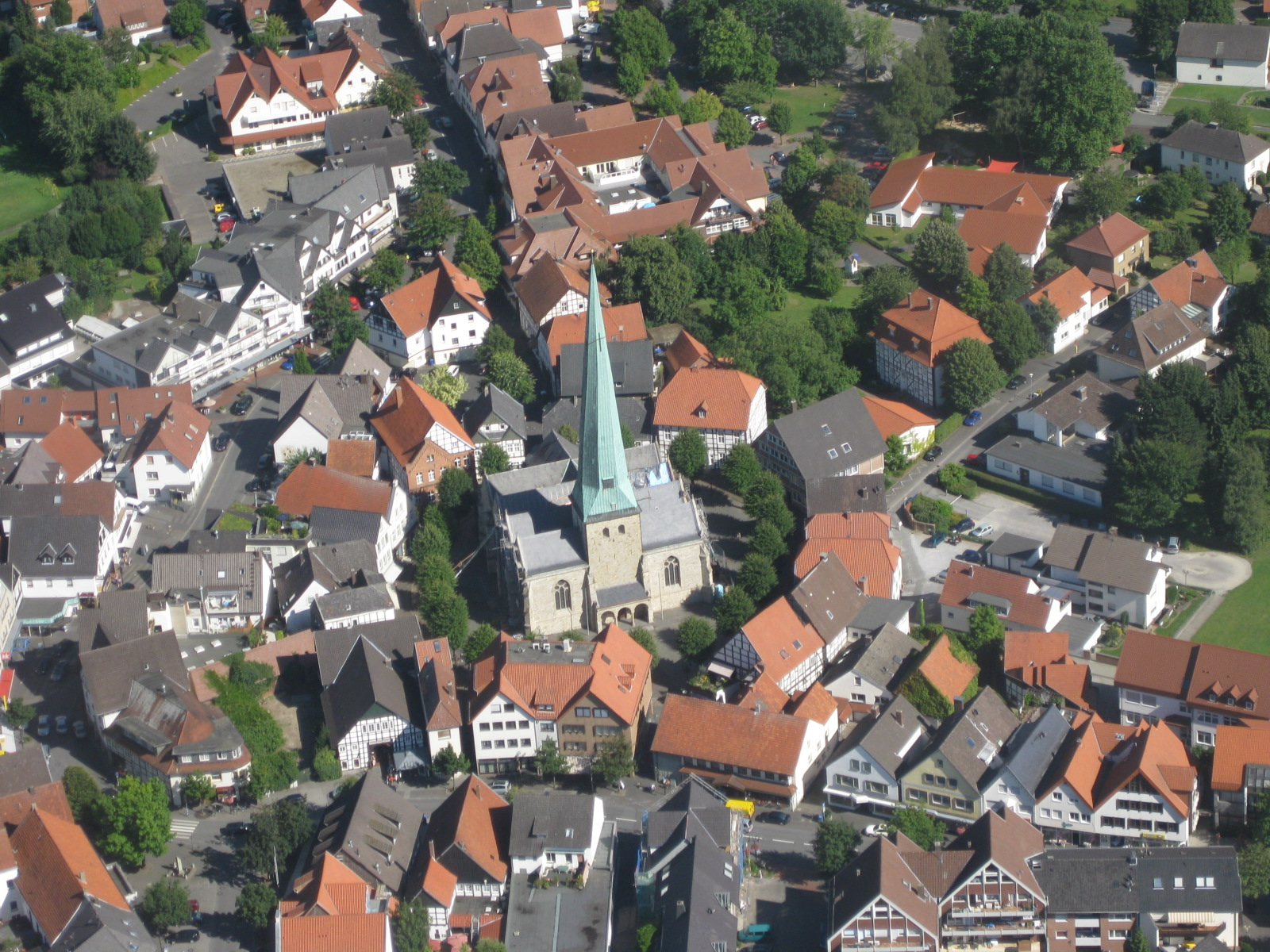
- Town centre of Delbrück

- Flag Coat of arms

- Location of Delbrück within Paderborn district
- Interactive map of Delbrück
- Location within Germany Location within North Rhine-Westphalia
- Coordinates: 51°46′00″N 08°34′00″E
- Country: Germany
- State: North Rhine-Westphalia
- Admin. region: Detmold
- District: Paderborn
- Subdivisions: 10

Government
  - Mayor (2020–25): Werner Peitz (Ind.)

Area
  - Total: 157.28 km^{2} (60.73 sq mi)
- Elevation: 77–114 m (253–374 ft)

Population (2025-12-31)
  - Total: 32,140
  - Density: 204.3/km^{2} (529.3/sq mi)
- Time zone: UTC+01:00 (CET)
  - Summer (DST): UTC+02:00 (CEST)
- Postal codes: 33129
- Dialling codes: 05250; 02944 Westenholz; 05294 Steinhorst
- Vehicle registration: PB
- Website: www.stadt-delbrueck.de

Delbrück (German pronunciation: [ˈdɛlˌbʁʏk]) is a town in the east of North Rhine-Westphalia, Germany, located in the district Paderborn.

== History ==
The first document mentioning the town dates to 1219. In 1410, the town was destroyed by fire during a conflict between the bishop of Paderborn and the bishop of Cologne.

== Subdivisions ==
Subdivisions	Population (30 June 2011)	Area (in km^{2})
Anreppen	1,336	9.89
Bentfeld	1,358	8.09
Boke	2,592	16.12
Delbrück	11,417	20.40
Hagen (Note: Hagen comprises Nordhagen and Sudhagen)	2,389	18.56
Lippling (Note: Lippling, Schöning, and Steinhorst were subdivisions of the former municipality of Westerloh)	2,143	15.48
Ostenland	3,025	21.80
Schöning	1,292	7.08
Steinhorst	769	8,15
Westenholz	3,693	31.75
Total	30,014	157.32

== Population ==
Historical population

Year	Pop.	±% p.a.
1965	16,934	—
1970	18,371	+1.64%
1975	19,735	+1.44%
1980	21,416	+1.65%
1985	22,583	+1.07%
1990	24,247	+1.43%
1995	27,700	+2.70%

Year	Pop.	±% p.a.
2000	29,212	+1.07%
2005	30,050	+0.57%
2010	30,047	−0.00%
2015	31,964	+1.24%
2020	32,039	+0.05%
2025	32,140	+0.06%

Source: Landesdatabank Nordrhein-Westfalen

== Mayors ==
- Robert Oelsmeier (CSU): 1999–2009
- Werner Peitz (independent) since 2009

== Twin towns – sister cities ==
Delbrück is twinned with:

- Budakeszi, Hungary
- Quérénaing, France
- Zossen, Germany

== Notable people ==
- Albert Florath (1888–1957), official advisor in Delbrück, worked in the Poor, Church and School Department as well as in the police department
- Martin Amedick (born 1982), footballer
- Dennis Eilhoff (born 1982), footballer
