= Hainigturm =

Tourist attraction in Hesse, Germany

Coordinates: 50°37′18.10″N 09°25′01.25″E

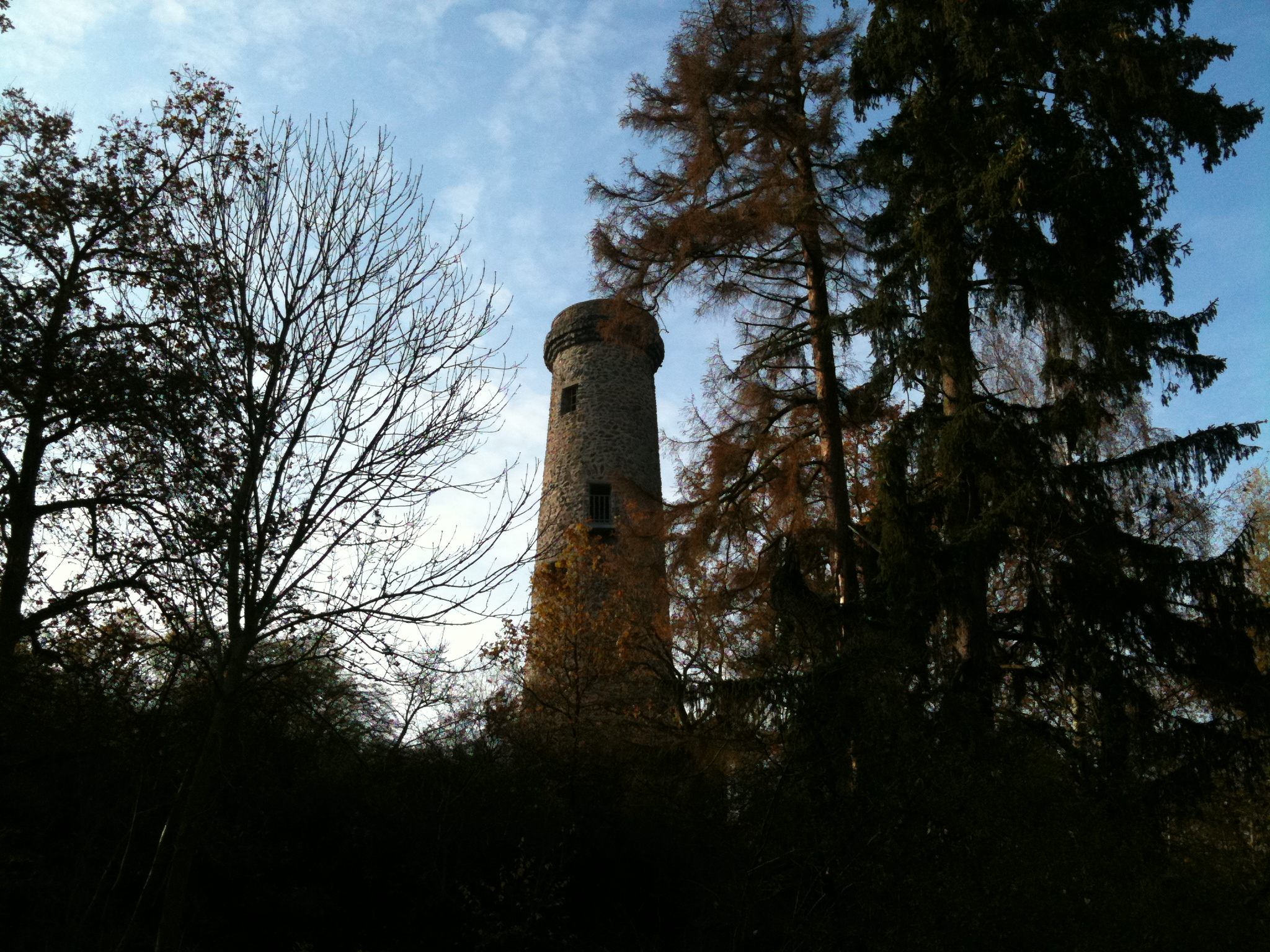
Hainigturm.

The Hainigturm is a tower and tourist attraction in the Vogelsbergkeis, (Hesse, Germany). It is located between Lauterbach and Angersbach. The tower, which now consists of stones, used to be made completely out of wood. However the wood got rotten so the tower had to be rebuilt in 1907.

In 2007 the Lauterbach celebrated the 100th anniversary of the tower.
