= Peace Candle =

Christmas structure in Easton, Pennsylvania, US

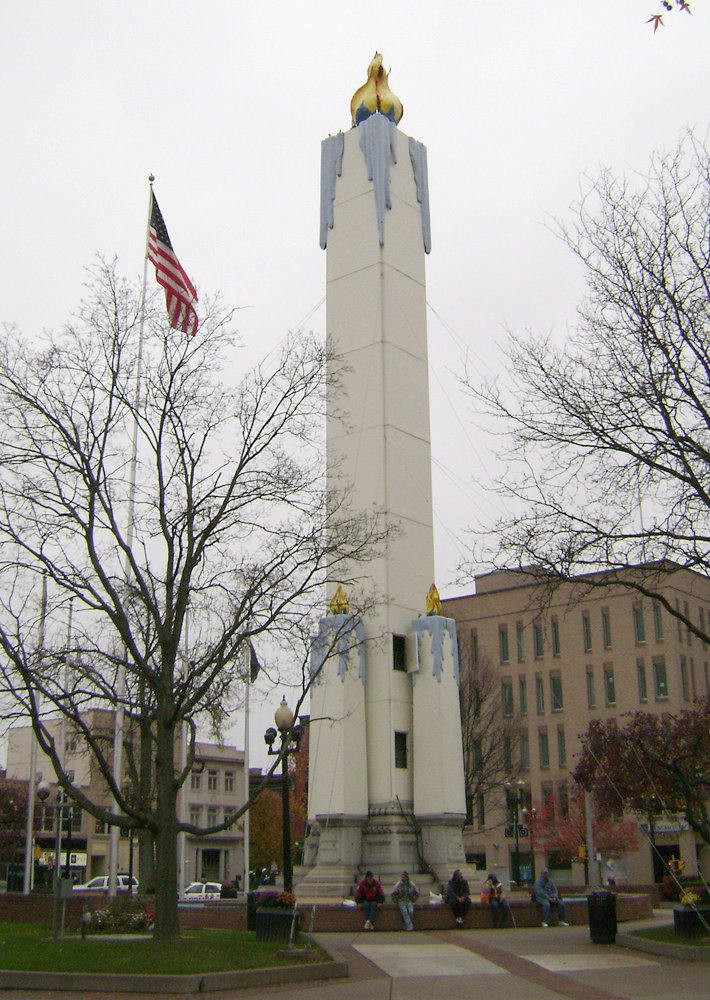
- The Peace Candle in the Centre Square of Easton, Pennsylvania, in November 2009.
- Interactive map of Peace Candle
- Location: Easton, Pennsylvania
- Coordinates: 40.6911°N 75.2090°W
- Established: December 10, 1951

The Peace Candle is a tower-like structure erected every Christmas season in Easton, Pennsylvania. The approximately 106-foot (32 m) tall structure, which resembles a giant candle, is assembled each year over the Soldiers' & Sailors' Monument, a Civil War memorial located in the city's Centre Square. It is typically assembled in mid November and lighted over Thanksgiving weekend and disassembled in early February each year.

The Peace Candle was first erected in 1951, and has been put up every year (except two) since then. Due to damage or disrepair, the Peace Candle has been replaced with new candle structures twice since the original construction. The first candle lasted until 1968, the second candle from 1969 to 1989, and the current candle was built in 1990. The structure is dedicated to the Easton area men and women who have served or are serving in the United States armed forces.

It has been said to be the largest non-wax Christmas candle in the country. Although conceived with the hopes of restoring Easton's pre-20th century reputation for elaborate Christmas decorations, city officials also believed a candle would serve as a symbol of peace for all religions and denominations. Due to its symbolism for peace and its placement over a Civil War monument, the candle has been the site of several anti-war protests over the decades. Some have criticized the Peace Candle, calling it a symbol of the over-commercialization of Christmas, and condemning the fact that it covers a war monument.

== Structure ==
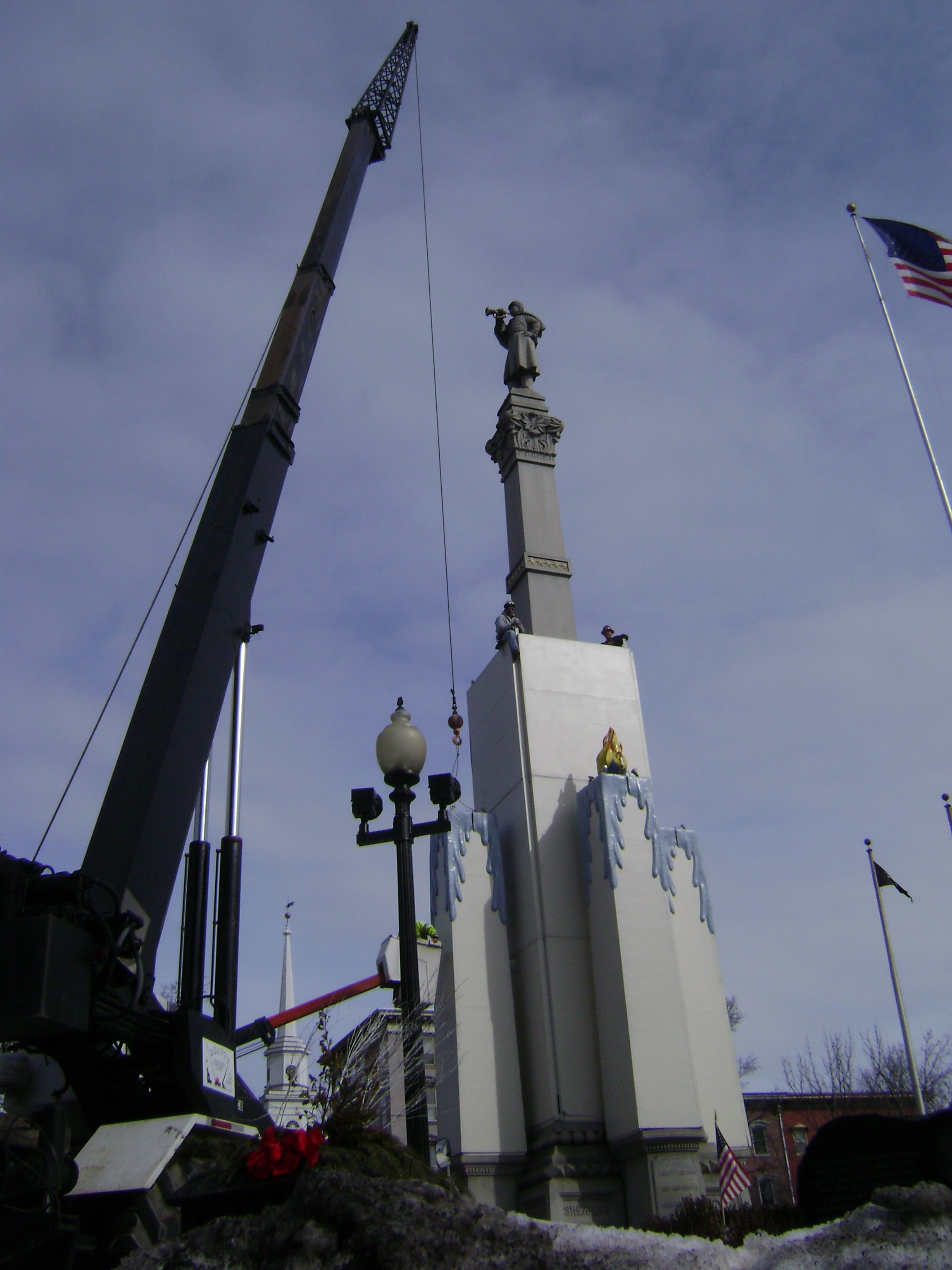
The Peace Candle is assembled over the Soldiers' & Sailors' Monument in Easton's Centre Square. Above, the top half of the monument is still visible, with the bottom half of the candle assembled around it.

The Peace Candle has undergone several changes and variations over the last 68 years. The current candle was built in 1990, and is expected to last until about 2014, after which time Easton officials expect to build a new one. As of 2009, the central main candle stands 94-foot (29 m), and the base brings it to about 106-foot (32 m). It reaches a height of about 118-foot (36 m) above ground level when factoring the monument it rests atop. When the candle is assembled, several 8-foot (2.4 m) by 8-foot by 10-foot (3.0 m) box pieces are placed around the Soldiers' & Sailors' Monument, a Civil War memorial in Centre Square, the town square of Easton's Downtown neighborhood. Made from marine-grade plywood and galvanized steel, the box pieces are stacked vertically until the structure is assembled, and then bolted together using about 500 bolts inside the Peace Candle. The flame placed atop the candle is about 15-foot (4.6 m) high and illuminated with 31 bulbs. The entire structure weighs between eight and 10 tons. The main candle is surrounded by four, 15-foot (4.6 m) high side candles, and a fountain that surrounds the Peace Candle's base is filled with a ring of Christmas trees.

The Peace Candle is believed to be the largest non-wax Christmas candle in the United States. Since it was first erected in 1951, Easton city officials have at various times declared it the largest candle in the world. In 1972, city council president Henry Schultz declared, "We claim, and no one has ever argued with us, that this is the largest candle in the world." However, the Schlitz Christmas Candle, a non-wax candle-like structure in Schlitz, a small town in Hesse, Germany, is larger at 138-foot (42 m) tall. The current Peace Candle is taller than the Guinness World Record-holder for tallest candle, which belongs to an 80-foot (24 m) tall, 8.5-foot (2.6 m) wide candle exhibited at the General Art and Industrial Exhibition of Stockholm in 1897. However, only wax candles are eligible for the record, and there is no Guinness World Record for largest non-wax candle. When the third incarnation of the Peace Candle was built in 1990, Easton officials tried unsuccessful to seek a Guinness record for it.

== Creation ==
Easton, the county seat of Northampton County in Pennsylvania, was considered one of the earliest cities to feature elaborate Christmas decoration displays on its city streets, with brightly colored lights and ornamental displays adorning its homes, businesses and residences long before they appeared in other American cities. Easton is also believed to be the home of America's first Christmas tree, as German immigrants who settled in Easton brought the symbol with them in 1816. By the mid-20th century, however, the predominance of Christmas decorations began to diminish in Easton, and support among city officials and residents began to wane as interest in the tradition dropped. Bethlehem, another Northampton County city, came better known for its elaborate Christmas decorations, although it has been suggested it followed the example first set by Easton. In 1951, Mrs. Hutton Hughes wrote a letter in the city's newspaper, The Easton Express, urging that a new holiday program of Christmas lighting be established in the city. On June 13, 1951, the Merchants Association of the Easton Chamber of Commerce responded to the letter by forming the Easton Area Christmas Committee, which set a goal of restoring the prestige of Easton's old Yuletide decorations. Several suggestions were made for a Christmas centerpiece in Centre Square, the town square of Easton's downtown neighborhood, to serve as the focal point of the Christmas program and promote downtown shopping. One of the suggestions was to pile evergreen trees around the Soldiers' & Sailors' Monument, a Civil War memorial located in Centre Square, but it was deemed too expensive to pursue. Another suggestion was to attach a giant candy cane atop the monument, but it was dismissed as too secular. During one of the committee meetings, Easton resident Virginia Purdy suggested the idea of assembling a large candle in Centre Square, "because it would have no commercial aspect and it would serve to further good will in the community". The proposal was accepted.

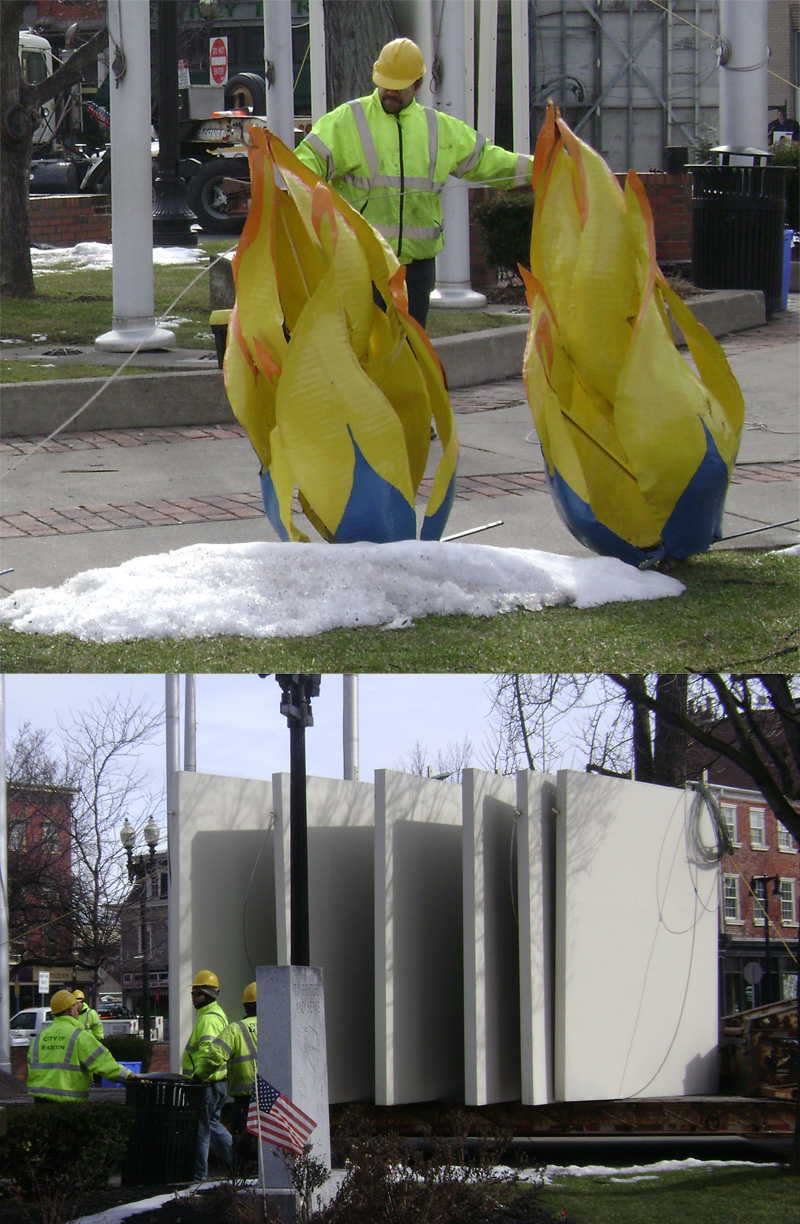
Above, an Easton public works employee stands next to two of the artificial flames that will be placed atop the smaller candle structures surrounding the larger Peace Candle. Below, the box pieces that form the sides of the candle are prepared to be taken away following disassembly.

Easton Councilman Frank Bechtel was named chairman of the Easton Area Christmas Committee, and W. Nilan Jones was appointed chairman of the construction subcommittee. Jones, with the help of committee member and architect William Tydeman, studied the engineering angles involved in building a wooden candle structure that could be assembled over the Soldiers' & Sailors' Monument. After determining such a project would be feasible, Jones drafted plans for a 96-foot (29 m) candle-shaped tower. The committee sought $4,000 for the Christmas display, and asked about 1,200 businesspeople were asked to make donations. Volunteers from the community, as well as members of the Local 239 United Brotherhood of Carpenters and Joiners of America, dedicated time, money and materials to the project, and Theodore Bean, proprietor of the local contractor company Bean, Inc., arranged for the use of his equipment and services to erect the candle.

However, four days before it was scheduled to be built, Tydeman determined the structure design was too high to withstand the winds, and that there was a risk that it could topple along with the Soldiers' & Sailors' Monument. Tydeman resigned from the project to protect his company from possibly liability, but helped the committee come up with a new, safer design. The committee considered piercing the plywood panels to allow wind to travel through, but Jones said "some of the wood could have splintered apart and taken someone's head off". Jones called A.P. Heller, the Reading-based company that built the Soldiers' & Sailors' Monument, and sought advice from the son of the man who owned the firm when the work was done. The son suggested shortening the candle would allow it to withstand the wind, but also delivered a message from his father: "He wants to know why you want to cover up his work?" The candle proposal was completely redesigned and cut to 80-foot (24 m).

The planned structure was referred to as the Christmas Candle, which it was called every year until 1967. Construction began on December 8, 1951. Using a crane with a 95-foot (29 m) berm, as well as electrical equipment and other tools, 20 workmen placed the heavy plywood sheathing sections along all four sides of the Soldiers' & Sailors' Monument. The structure was red with speckles of gold and silver, and green fir foliage around the base. It was assembled in four sections, which each ranged between 300 pounds (140 kg) and 750 pounds (340 kg) in weight. Once the tower was complete, it was topped off by an electric neon "flame". Since the Christmas Candle design was cut to 80-foot (24 m), the top of the candle reached the base of a bugler statue at the top of the memorial. The flame consisted a cage-like frame of curved steel bars covered with yellow neon lights. The flame was placed over the bugler, and a yellow cotton sack was placed atop the statue to further create the image of a flame, and so the bugler would not be visible atop the candle. Plastic wax drippings were designed to extend downward from the top of the candle beneath the flame. Construction of the Christmas Candle progressed slower than expected because Bean Inc. contractors had trouble attaching the base sections. The work was not finished until December 9. The original Christmas Candle display cost $3,390.92, all of which was offset by donations from about 271 donors amounting to $4,055.35 in total.

== First candle (1951–1968) ==
=== Inaugural decade ===
Thus there was a living evidence of unity such as this nation needs in these fast-moving and dangerous times. ... The giant candle in the Circle can be a symbol of peace and good citizenship, and of that unity without which this nation could not exist. Again, all honor to the public-spirited citizens, men and women, whose concerted efforts made possible the placing of such an unusual Yuletide decoration.

— The Easton Express editorial, 1951

On December 10, 1951, Easton Mayor Joseph Morrison flipped the switch to light up the Christmas Candle during its first dedication ceremony. Joining Morrison and Frank Bechtel in the dedication were a Catholic priest, a Jewish rabbi and a Protestant minister, to demonstrate the Christmas Candle was meant to serve as a symbol of peace for all religions and denominations. News reports indicate between 500 and 1,000 people attended the ceremony. In addition to the candle, the decorations included Christmas trees, smaller candle displays, large plywood wreaths and Christmas lights set up by students from the Easton High School and the city's Wolf and Schull junior high schools. It also included a plaque honoring the Easton area men and women on active duty in the United States armed forces. The Delaware River Joint Toll Bridge Commission decorated the nearby Northampton Street bridge, which crossed the Delaware River, with its first Christmas light display in 14 years. A series of nightly Christmas choir concerts were held in front of the Christmas Candle starting December 18, and organ music was piped to the Centre Square from the city's First Presbyterian Church. Downtown business owners participated by decorating their windows with Christmas themes. Morrison called the Christmas Candle display "the most elaborate in Easton's history". The Christmas Candle was so large it drew the attention of airplanes passing over the city.

On December 11, however, one of the neon lights in the flame structure short-circuited and started a fire on the yellow cotton sack placed over the bugler statue, causing an actual fire on the Christmas Candle flame for a brief amount of time. The blaze caused only minor damage to the Christmas Candle, but the bugler statue was exposed and visible inside the flame for the rest of the season. Despite this setback, the Christmas Candle was widely considered a success, and the Easton Area Christmas Committee signed a charter on December 17, 1951, tasking itself with organizing a yearly holiday program revolving around the Christmas Candle. The candle was assembled again every Christmas season until 1961, with ceremonies generally including holiday decorations, Christmas carols, refreshments, appearances by Santa Claus and other forms of entertainment. The Easton Area Christmas Committee was responsible for raising the funds and encouraging the civic interest necessary to keep the program active.

In 1952, a new, fireproof flame as designed in response to the previous year's fire. The new flame design enclosed the steel tubing of the flame (which concealed the bugler statue), looked more realistic and better matched the flames on the four smaller candles at the Christmas Candle's base. The 1952 Christmas Candle display included further expansions from the previous year, including the addition of 20 new plywood light standard plaques by the Easton High School, as well as decorations on the Bushkill Street Bridge in addition to the Northampton Street bridge. With the hopes of increasing nationwide publicity for the Christmas Candle, the Easton City Council started dubbing the structure, "the world's largest Christmas candle". The Easton Area Christmas Committee continued raising the funds for the Christmas program up until 1957, when they needed to raise $3,500 from the public to make necessary repairs to the Christmas Candle for safety reasons. The next year, the committee started to receive a budget from the city, and were approved for $3,000 by the city council in 1958. The program continued to grow each year, and included 3,000 Evergreen trees assembled around the Centre Square by 1957, when more than 500 people attended the lighting ceremony in 20-degree weather.

=== Removal and reconstruction ===
In 1961, the Christmas Candle fell into a state of disrepair, and the contractors who assemble the candle for discounted prices in previous years informed the city they could not handle the project again. The Easton Area Christmas Committee also had trouble raising additional money needed for the repairs, For all these reasons, they decided not to assemble the candle again. The candle was placed into storage at an old incinerator plant on Pennsylvania Route 611, and the Easton Area Christmas Committee sought alternative decorations for its holiday program. In 1961, 24 streams of multi-colored Christmas light strands (totaling 2,650 bulbs) were draped from the top of the monument to the edges of Centre Square, creating an umbrella-like shape of lights. More than 200 Christmas Trees were also placed around the base of the monument, along with a nativity scene and Christmas light decorations on the nearby bridges. The set-up cost only $2,000, compared to the average $3,000 for the Christmas Candle display. This display was used for the next five years, and the decorations around the Soldiers' & Sailors' Monument came to be known as "the umbrella of Christmas lights".

In early 1965, Easton City Councilman Fred Ashton conducted a report announcing there had been "considerable criticism" of Easton's holiday decorations, prompting the Easton Area Christmas Committee to consider restoring the candle. But public contributions had continued to decline, and the project was so expensive the city deemed they could not afford it. The next year, however, Councilman Henry Schultz started an effort to restore the Christmas Candle. Schultz recruited a number of volunteers to make the necessary repairs, including Easton artist Joseph DeThomas, who repainted the structure. Councilman William Tomino also urged that repairs be made, claiming the candle was "known all around the world" and should remain part of Easton's holiday celebration. A new, 14-foot (4.3 m) flame was built using a new type of quartz, which used 6,000 watts to create a stronger light. The candle was erected and lighted at a ceremony on November 25, 1966, for the first time in six years. Easton Mayor George S. Smith flipped the switch, and the candle was once again dedicated to the local men and women of the armed forces. More than 400 people attended the ceremony, which this year also included 68 Christmas trees decorated with 1,500 lights.

In the fall of 1967, it was decided the Christmas Candle would be renamed the Peace Candle, because the city planned to sell Christmas cards depicting the structure and hoped Easton would become known as "the Peace Candle city". On October 18, the city's businesses issued a statement, "Whether you choose to call it a Christmas Candle or a Peace Candle is not important. The important aspect is that the Candle is our clarion call, and this call will be issued this year as a reaffirmation of our desire for peace and harmony in all facts of our lives and throughout the world." On November 27, 1967, about 1,500 people attended the Peace Candle lighting, which would prove to be the final ceremony of its kind for that incarnation of the candle, which would be rebuilt in subsequent years. The bells of six different downtown churches were rung during the ceremony, and people surrounded the Peace Candle holding lit wax candles themselves. Also in 1967, a photo and caption of the Peace Candle was featured in the December 6 issue Weekly Reader, a national children's newspaper circulated in the nation's schools. A columnist for the magazine named "Aunt Em" said it was featured because, "I think the candle in Easton is especially lovely since it is a symbol for both Hanukkah and Christmas". Appeared on December 6, 1967.

== Second candle (1969–1989) ==
=== Fire damage and new construction ===
On October 25, 1968, a fire at the former incinerator plant off Route 611, where the Peace Candle was being stored, destroyed the four smaller candles that surround the base of the larger candle. The fire was believed to have started by someone playing with matches inside the building. Firefighters battled the blaze for more than an hour. Damage was estimated at a cost of $1,200. Initially, city officials announced the fire would not delay the lighting ceremony planned for December 1. However, the Easton Area Christmas Committee had already been debating the construction of a new Peace Candle prior to the fire. On October 29, Henry Schultz, now chairman of the Christmas committee, announced the four smaller candles were damaged beyond repair and no effort would be made to rebuild them. Instead, the committee would build an entirely new candle within a year.

The original plywood candle was replaced with a stronger candle made of fiberglass and galvanized steel, the covering of which was stretched on steel and wood frames. It was designed by the Allentown-based firm Rileigh's Inc. and constructed at a cost of about $12,500. The flame was built out of fiberglass strips with lights that changed color in sequence, to create a more realistic burning flame than the original candle. The new structure was 90-foot (27 m), compared to the original 80-foot (24 m). Each side of the new candle was about 8.5-foot (2.6 m) wide on each side. Due to the increase in size, it was no longer necessary to place the flame structure over the bugler statue on the top of the Soldiers' & Sailors' Monument. Four new smaller candles were built and stood 20-foot (6.1 m) tall and were about 3-foot (0.91 m) wide on each side. Special lighting equipment was added to give the Peace Candle a natural effect that would make it realistically flicker throughout the night. At the base of the candles, 75 10-foot (3.0 m) tall evergreen trees with gold ornaments were placed, strung with more than 2,000 Christmas tree lights.

The first lighting ceremony for the new candle was held on November 28, 1969, and attended by about 450 people. Mayor Fred Ashton Jr. threw the switch, and Rev. Harry Maue of the Olivet Presbyterian Church urged that the symbol serve as a symbol of peace in America, noting the growing casualties in the Vietnam War at the time. Schultz said the new candle was symbolic of the growing development in the Easton area. The new candle was stored in the city's garage on Bushkill Drive while not assembled.

=== Second candle ===
The new candle sustained some minor damage over its first few years. On November 20, 1970, heavy rain and inclement weather snapped a wire helping keep the structure in place, and firefighters had to install additional braces the next day. Also that year, about 75 lights were stolen from the decorative Christmas trees set up around the candle's base. In 1971, the building where the Peace Candle was stored was broken into and the fiberglass paneling was vandalized. Easton officials declined to discuss the extent of the damage, but Henry Schultz dismissed the vandals as "kids". In 1974, the Peace Candle was only lit a few hours a night, and not at all on some nights, due to an ongoing energy crisis, which prompted the Metropolitan Edison Company to ask its Easton area customers not to use Christmas lights that year. Since the Peace Candle was seldom lit, charitable donations dropped in 1974, resulting in an $800 defect for the Easton Area Christmas Committee. Additionally the committee spent $1,700 in Peace Candle Christmas cards meant to bring in donations, but only 500 packs were sold at $1 each. The use of less electricity to light the Peace Candle did not help the committee because the city paid the lighting bill.

In November 1975, new concrete had been poured at Center Square as part of a beautification project, and the Peace Candle could not be assembled without damaging the work. As a result, the Easton Area Christmas Committee hastily organized a Christmas tree lighting on the Easton Redevelopment Authority parking lot, which was attended by only about 200 people, far below the usual candle lighting ceremony attendance. James Darvin, vice president of the Christmas committee, called it a "last-minute affair". In order to ensure the candle was erected in 1976, Nazareth contractor Stewart Beatty donated equipment and employees to help erect the structure, along with local carpenters, electricians and city workers. Downtown Easton businesses also donated $1,600 to help offset the $3,500 cost of refurbishing and putting up the candle. Although the Peace Candle was erected and lit in 1977, the formal lighting ceremony had to be canceled due to heavy rain and cold temperatures. Larry Holmes, the heavyweight boxing champion and Easton native, threw the switch himself during the lighting ceremony on November 24, 1978.

Throughout the late-1970s and the 1980s, the Nazareth-based firm Beatty Contractors erected the candle each year. The firm originally did the project for free, but began charging $2,000 in 1981 when the cost of fuel started to rise. During the Peace Candle lighting ceremony on November 28, 1980, Easton Mayor Philip Mitman dedicated the candle to the 52 American hostages being held in Iran during the Iran hostage crisis. During a storm on December 6, 1983, 47 mile-per-hour winds caused the Peace Candle to start tilting in place. When city workers removed the flame next day, they realized the bugler statue atop the Soldiers' & Sailors' Monument had moved on its base and would have toppled over had it not been leaning against the candle structure. One of the candle's anchor cables was also snapped by the wind and torn out of the brickwork. The cable was repaired and the bugler statue, which was previously held by its own weight, was reinforced with grouting. A sixteen-pound chunk of granite was also dislodged from the top of the statue, although in an area that most spectators cannot see from ground level. The candle suffered similar damage in 1988, when high winds loosened parts of the structure and snapped support wires. As a result, it had to be taken down early on January 5, 1989. In 1985, the Easton Area Christmas Committee was renamed to the Easton Holiday Committee.

== Third candle (1990–present) ==
=== Construction of new structure ===
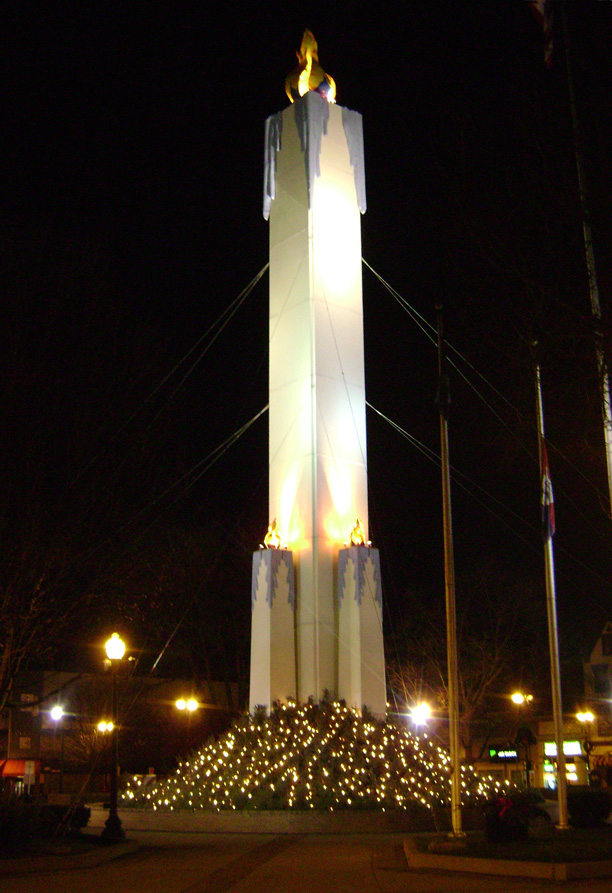
The Peace Candle lit at night (2009)

By 1989, the Peace Candle had become so dilapidated that it was hardly able to sustain the winter weather. Strong winds in November had shaken the structure so much that the wax dripping fixtures atop the candle had fallen off. On November 16, 1989, Mayor Sal Panto Jr. announced on WEST's Voice of the People show that the Peace Candle would not go up another year because the support structure was too weak and the Easton Area Christmas Committee was not receiving enough donations to pay for repairs. The committee was now receiving an average of $3,000 a year in donations, which was used to maintain the existing candle. Panto said, "The sad reality is, this is the last year." However, new fundraising efforts were started to raise $20,000 to build a new Peace Candle. Local businesses and unions volunteered their time and materials to work on it, with the Lehigh Valley Carpenters Union working up to 100 hours a week for about five weeks to have the candle ready for the 1990 holiday season.

The new candle was designed by the Allentown firm Alvin Butz Co., the Allentown firm Barry Isett & Associates, and Bethlehem Steel Corp. Supplies were provided by Dugan & Marcon Inc., Eisenhardt Mills, Ingersoll-Rand Co. and Dectis Painting, and the construction done by the Carpenters Union Local 600, Electricians Union Local 367 and the Northampton County Labor Council. It looked almost exactly the same as the old previous candle, with eight flood lights installed to illuminate the white shaft. The candle cost $35,000 to build, but Panto said without the help from volunteers, it would have cost around $150,000, not including labor. In order to cover the $15,000 shortfall in funds raised, the city sold Christmas cards, posters, ornaments and $10 Peace Candle ownership shares. The first lighting ceremony for the new candle was held November 23, 1990.

=== Third candle ===
On January 12, 1999, the spotlights surrounding the Peace Candle were accidentally turned on, and the heat from the lights ignited a fire among several of the Christmas trees surrounding the structure. Several residents called police and sprayed the flames with fire extinguishers until city firefighters arrived to put out the blaze. Although flames reached as high as 30 feet, only the trees were damaged and the Peace Candle itself was undamaged. The incident spurred discussion about removing the trees altogether, but Easton officials insisted the fire was just a fluke accident. New spotlights were installed in 2000, which lit the candle from top to bottom and focused on the Soldiers' & Sailors' Monument for the rest of the year.

By 2000, the city's Christmas decorations also included lighted snowflakes on the utility poles of Easton streets surrounding the Peace Candle. The 32 six-foot snowflake decorations cost just over $10,800, which were funded in part by a $6,000 Community Development Block Grant secured by the city. The Easton Holiday Committee said it was becoming increasing difficult to raise sufficient funds for the holiday display and sought $10,000 from the city council, but they were rejected. In response, six of the eleven Easton Holiday Committee members resigned in March 2001, prompting fear that the Peace Candle would not be erected during its 50th anniversary that following holiday season. However, the committee was filled with new volunteers who revamped efforts to raise funds through the sale of wax candles and greeting cards. The Peace Candle was lit during a ceremony on November 23, 2001, in dedication to the victims of the September 11 terrorist attacks, as well as rescue workers from New York City, The Pentagon and Somerset County, Pennsylvania who responded the day of the attacks.

In 2003, a six-foot slab of fiberglass from the imitation wax at the top of the candle was knocked loose by 50 mile-per-hour winds during a storm. Nobody was injured. James Pruznick, a filmmaker from Pohatcong Township, New Jersey, made a documentary film in 2004 focused on that year's assembly of the Peace Candle, as well as interviews with politicians, artists, merchants and construction workers about the history of the structure. It was first screened in December 2004 and made available subsequently on VHS and DVD. In October 2008, fear grew that the Peace Candle would no longer be erected when Easton employees who previously volunteer to climb the Peace Candle structure no longer wished to assemble it. Those fears were put to rest the next month, however, when the trade union Lehigh Valley Erectors Inc. volunteered to put the candle up.

In 2007, Easton Mayor Phil Mitman dedicated that year's lighting to the troops fighting in Iraq and all of America's veterans. At about 7 p.m., the mayor introduced U.S. Navy veteran Kyle Stocker, whose son 4½-year-old Kayden hit the switch to turn on the spotlights illuminating the candle.

In 2009, Superior Court Judge Jack Panella won a $770 bid on the auction website eBay to flip the switch and turn on the Peace Candle during the candle-lighting ceremony on November 27, 2009. In November 2010, Easton Holiday Committee Chairwoman Sandy O'Brien-Werner voiced doubts that the current candle structure would last until 2014 as previously projected and might need to be replaced sooner. She expressed concern at the cost of such a venture, claiming the Peace Candle cost $14,640 in 2010 alone for maintenance and operation and that an altogether new structure would cost at least $35,000. In response, six-year-old MaryElizabeth Soffera and eight-year-old Katie Dietrich, two cousins from Williams Township who loved the Peace Candle, opened a snow cone stand during a garage sale to raise money for the candle. They raised $23, which they presented to Mayor Sal Panto Jr. during a November city council meeting.

== Anti-war protests and vigils ==
Due to its symbolism for peace and its placement over a Civil War monument, the Peace Candle has been the site of several anti-war protests over the decades. On December 16, 1972, a group of Vietnam War protesters gathered at the Trinity Episcopal Church in Easton and drafted a petition asking Easton City Council to keep the Peace Candle up all year long until the war was ended. Although the protesters acknowledged it was unlikely their request would be granted, they felt the petition itself was a symbolic gesture. Easton City Council President Henry Schultz commended the idea, but said it was not within the authority of the council and that it would be "physically impossible" to keep the candle up all year. At the time, liability insurance was only available up to February 1, and that keeping it up longer than necessary increased the possibility of an accident or damage from the weather. As part of the petition, the protesters asked city council to draft a resolution formally naming the structure the Peace Candle, claiming although it was commonly referred to by that name, a formal name had never been officially established. Schultz refuted that request, claiming the name had already been established five years earlier.

In 1975, the activist citizens group Lehigh-Pocono Committee of Concern (LEPOCO) formed a "human peace candle" in front of the real structure as a protest against the Vietnam War. Three group members formed a triangle while another man stood on top of their shoulders, holding a lighted candle and a sign that read, "Bring the troops home for Christmas and the rest of the year". The protest marked the 10th anniversary of LEPOCO's first protest against the war when they formed in 1965, which was also held at Center Square. In December 1981, the Polish labor union Solidarity held a late-night peace rally that included a candlelight vigil, singing and prayers for a peaceful resolution to the martial law crisis in Poland. In 1991, the city decided to leave the Peace Candle standing until the Gulf War conflict was resolved in honor of the 500,000 American troops serving in the war. The gesture was approved after a pool of residents indicated a ratio of 10-to-1 supported it. During this time, supporters of the troops tied yellow ribbons around the candle and its surrounding fence, while protesters tied black ribbons to symbolize those who died in the conflict. The candle was taken down that March after the war ended.

On November 14, 2015, the candle was lit nearly two weeks prior to the official ceremony date after local resident Joe Mercado posted to an Easton, Pennsylvania Facebook community page asking to light the candle to show support for the people of Paris, France after a terrorist attack the day before. Due to overwhelming response to the post, the city organized a candle light vigil that evening with several hundred residents attending. Prayers were offered in several languages, including French, and several faiths. Easton Mayor Sal Panto Jr. and Allentown Mayor Ed Pawlowski spoke. The candle remained lit for three days before being shut off until the official lighting event.

== Merchandise and memorabilia ==
In 1967, the Easton Area Christmas Committee began selling greeting cards depicting Easton's Peace Candle with the hopes of raising funds to maintain the city's holiday decorations. The committee created 15,000 cards that year, and the city's Downtown Improvement Group urged residents to buy the cards and mail them to friends and family across the country, with the hopes that Easton would become nationally known as the "Peace Candle City". The cards were sold in packs of three for $1 at city businesses and homes. They were designed in four colors from a painting by Easton artist Joseph DeThomas depicting the Centre Square and the Peace Candle. The 15,000 cards went on sale on Starting on October 18, 1967, Starting on October 18, 1967, and 12,000 were already sold by October 30. The rest by November 1, and another and another 15,000 due to what Councilman Henry Schultz called the "tremendous demand". In 1969, to advertise and celebrate the first lighting ceremony for the second candle, the Easton Area Christmas Committee sold placemats and napkin sets with an image of the Peace Candle in a night setting. Ten thousand sets were sold for $1 each at various stores and banks in the city.

Both in 1967 and 1968, U.S. Rep. Fred B. Rooney lobbied the United States Post Office Department seeking for the Peace Candle to chosen for the official Christmas Stamp in the following year. However, it was rejected both years by the Citizens' Stamp Advisory Committee, which reviewed the proposals and narrowed the applications. In 1968, an image of the painting The Annunciation by Jan van Eyck was chosen rather than the Peace Candle. In October 1979, the Schaefferstown, Pennsylvania-based Michter's Distillery created whiskey decanters patterned after the Peace Candle. The idea was first posed by Mark Hammerstone of Palmer Township, a decanter collector who approached Schultz with the concept in 1978. Schultz brought the idea to the distillery, which chose to base their second annual Christmas decanter on the Peace Candle. They spent $3,500 to build a 12-inch (300 mm) sculpture based on photos of the structure. The decanter, which holds 750-millilitre (26 imp fl oz; 25 US fl oz) is off-white with red and yellow flames atop the candles and bunches of Christmas greens around the base. Six thousand decanters were produced and originally sold for a $49.50 retail price. They were shipped to collectors as far as Texas, California and England.

In 1990, the city released a china plate with the Peace Candle along with a Christmas tree, which was meant to symbolize the first tree in the nation, which was believed to have been erected in Easton in 1816. During the 2000 holiday season, the Easton Holiday Committee produced and sold commemorative plates marking the 50th anniversary of the Peace Candle, which included a painting of the structure by local artist Preston Hindmarch. They were sold for $32 along with ceramic ornaments of the Easton eatery Colonial Pizza, which sold for $22. Over the years, Christmas cards depicting the Peace Candle have continued to be used as a means of raising funds for the structure.

== Criticism ==
Ever since the Peace Candle was first erected, some Easton residents have been critical of the structure, arguing it is a tacky symbol of the over-commercialization of Christmas and not a tasteful way to convey a message of peace. Many have condemned the fact that the Peace Candle covers the Soldiers' & Sailors' Monument, which proponents see as a sign of disrespect toward veterans. Critics have also argued the candle is too expensive to maintain each year, and some have claimed the phallic shape of the symbol is inappropriate. In 1982, a petition was signed by 90 people and submitted to the Easton City Council seeking to discontinue the Peace Candle tradition, calling it a "garish symbol of inner-city decadence". The group wanted to replace it with a decorative display of evergreen tree, in honor of Easton's claim to be the first city in the United States to observe that German custom. The city rejected the petition after conducting a survey of public opinion, which polled 29 city residents in favor of the Peace Candle and four against it.

== See also ==
- Peace Light of Bethlehem
- Amnesty candle
