= Georg Christian Dieffenbach =

German poet and theologian

Georg Christian Dieffenbach (4 December 1822 Schlitz, Hesse - 10 May 1901 Schlitz) was a German poet and theologian.

== Biography ==
Dieffenbach was educated at Giessen and was made chief pastor in Schlitz in 1871. His poems for children are still very popular in Germany. He also wrote many liturgical, devotional, homiletic and poetical works, which attained a great degree of popularity.
