= Allmenrod =

Village in north Hesse, Germany

Coordinates: 50°38′00″N 9°20′30″E

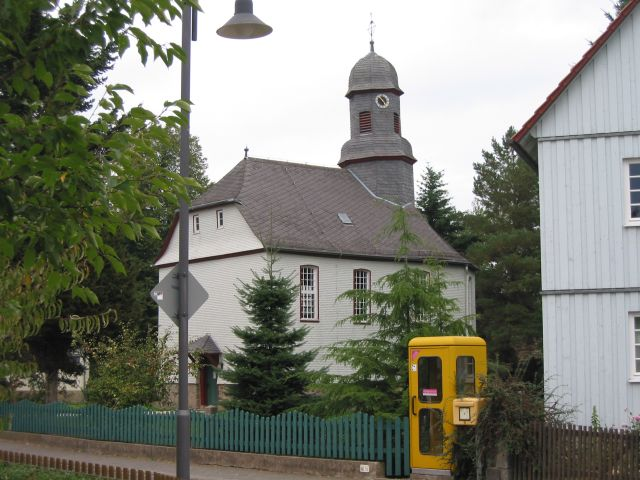
A church in Allmenrod

Allmenrod is a small village in north Hesse (Germany) with a population of 350 (2003). It is a part of Lauterbach.

== History ==
In books Allmenrod was first mentioned in 1131. The first official documents about the population in the town were found in 1854. At this time the village had a population 347 people. In the following years, many residents moved out of Allmenrod and into larger towns and cities, largely because of increasing poverty.

=== World War I and the Early Twenties ===
In the First World War there was a big mobilization of soldiers in the village. The total number of casualties resulted in 13 people. Their names were written down on the memorial of the cemetery. Compared with larger towns, Allmenrod was less affected by food shortages because of the village's high number of farms. In the early twenties Allmenrod was connected to the electricity network. In these years the village also received a central water supply.

=== The Second World War ===
In the Second World War 15 villagers lost their lives. On March 29, 1945 the village was taken by the 4th Armored Division of the United States.

=== After 1945 ===
In the year 1946 Allmenrod took in more than 100 displaced persons. These were rehoused in many households. In 1950 the names of the fallen soldiers of World War II were transcribed on a war memorial of the cemetery.
