= Peace Light of Bethlehem =

Charity program for disabled people

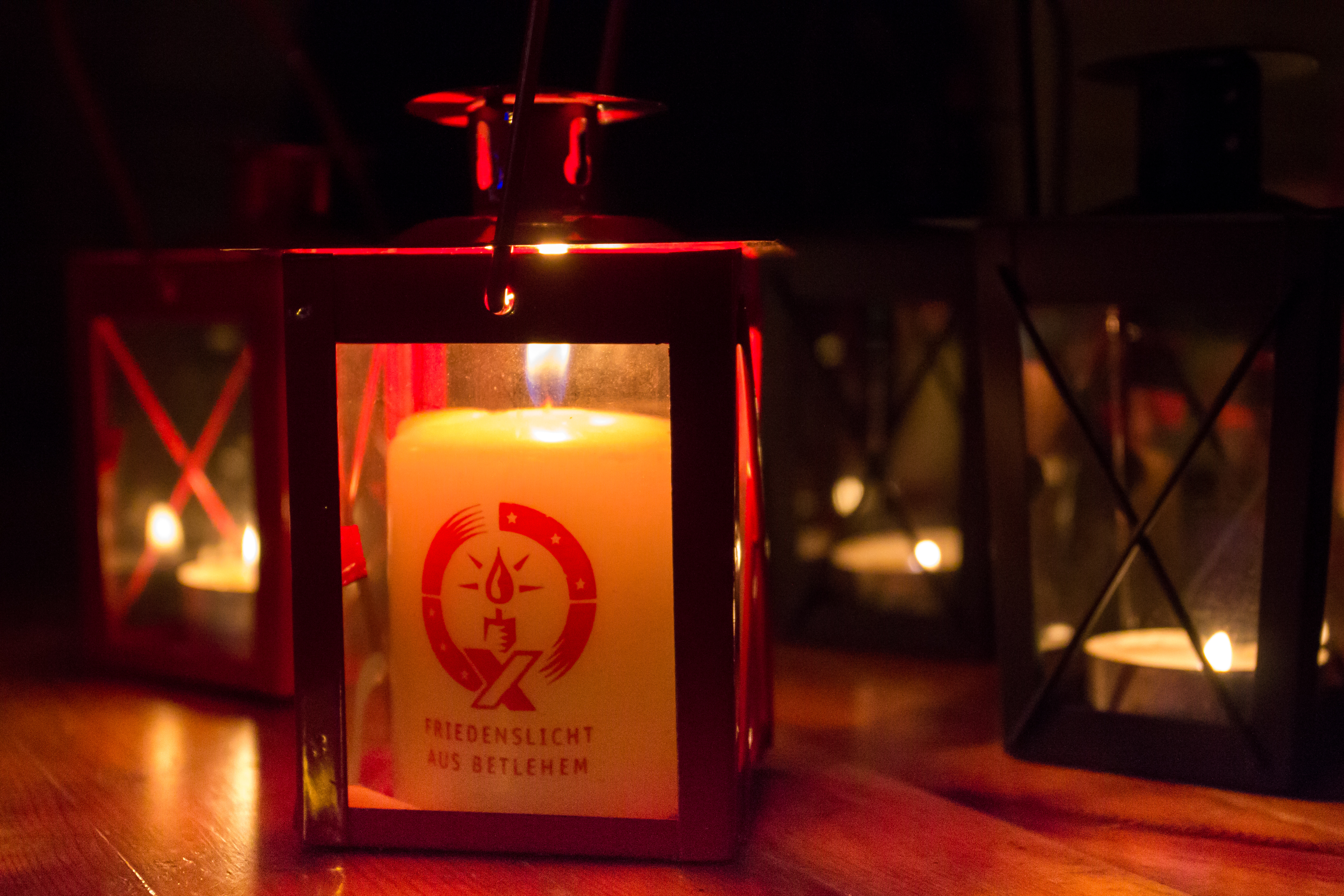
Bethlehem Peace Light lamp

The Peace Light of Bethlehem is a program inaugurated in Austria in 1986 as part of a charitable relief mission for handicapped children and people in need. It has gone to more than 20 countries in Europe, as well as the Americas.

Every year before Christmas, the flame originates at the Grotto of the Nativity in Bethlehem and goes to Austria. From there it is distributed throughout the country by the Scout movement. The light signifies the peace to as many people as possible.

== History ==
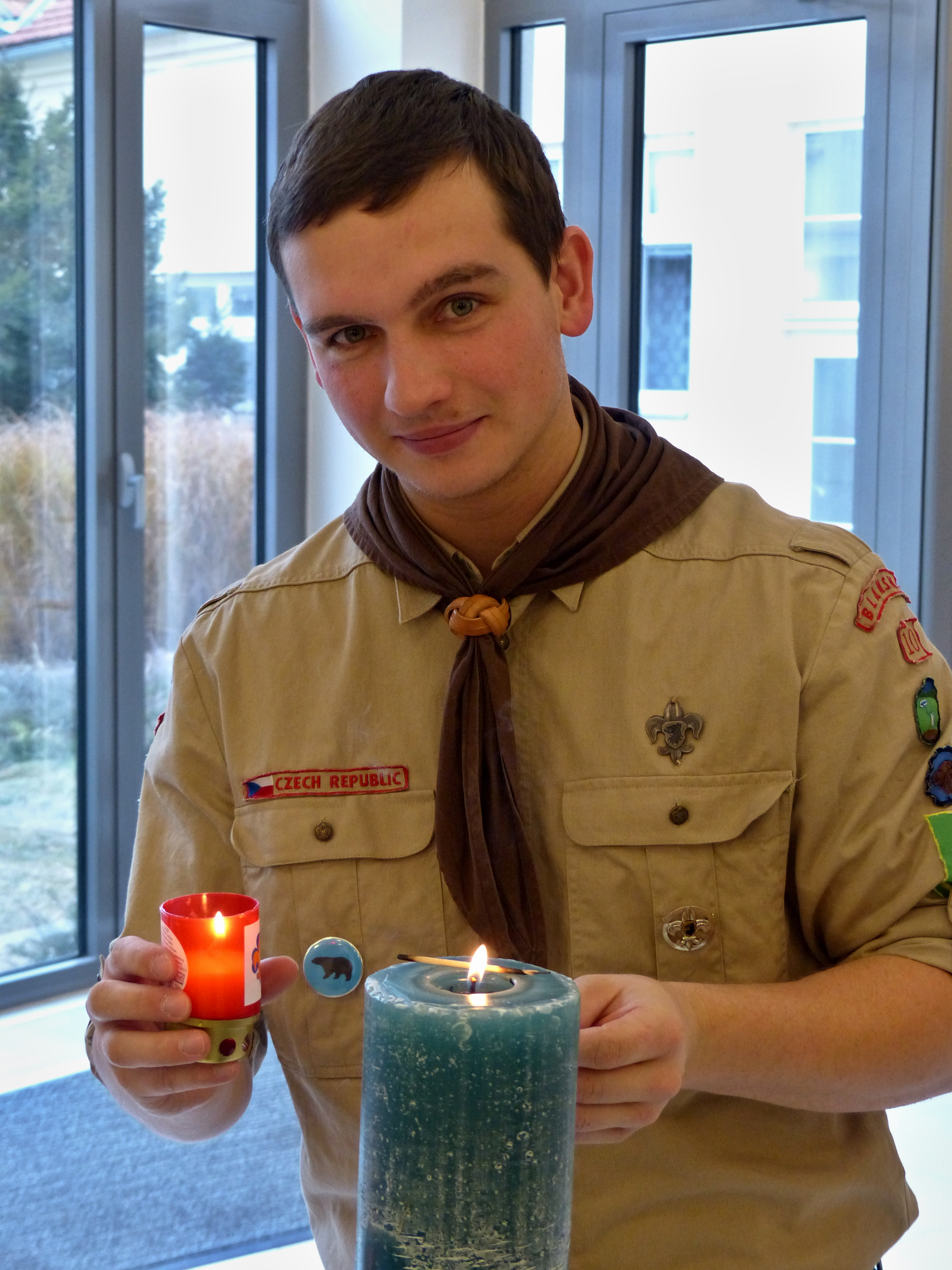
Peace Light in Blansko 2013

The Austrian Broadcasting Corporation (ORF OÖ) founded the "Light of Peace from Bethlehem" as a new Christmas tradition more than 30 years ago back in 1986. The State of Upper Austria has supported the Light of Peace from the very beginning. Meanwhile, it is shining each year all over Europe, in the United States and even in some countries in South America. In recent years, it has also been handed over to many political and religious leaders as well as international organisations.

Since its inception, it has served as a reminder of the Christmas message of peace on the Nativity of Christ in Bethlehem and thus of the deeper meaning of Christmas. Every November an especially chosen child travels to Bethlehem with several hundred participants of the "Friedenslichtreise" (Light of Peace journey). A delegation led by the Governor of Upper Austria Thomas Stelzer also accompanies this trip. This child receives the light in a lantern from the Birth Grotto in Bethlehem. Austrian Airlines then brings the Light of Peace in a special oil lamp to Austria. Here it is passed from person to person during Christmas days, but also through organisations, such as the Scouts, the light is distributed from Upper Austria throughout Europe and the world.

Upper Austria's Governor Thomas Stelzer personally leads the delegation to deliver the Light of Peace from Bethlehem via Linz to the European Capital City of Brussels. Traditionally it is handed over in a Christmas Ceremony to the President of the European Commission as well as to the colleagues from all EU countries. 2018 for the first time the light was also officially brought to the Royal Family in Belgium.

In 1989 the light was welcomed by 10,000 people on the main square of the South Bohemian city České Budějovice as a symbol of the new neighbourhood and solidarity. In addition, it shone at the opening of the Berlin Wall. After the fall of the Iron Curtain, an Upper Austrian delegation brought it to the new neighbours in Berlin and Thuringia in Germany.

The Light of Peace was also presented at Ground Zero in New York and to UN soldiers at the Golan Heights.

It is a call that everyone must stand up for peace and therefore consciously pass on the light. During a private audience, Pope Benedict XVI called it a "symbol of hearts."

== Conscious symbol of peace in Europe and the world ==
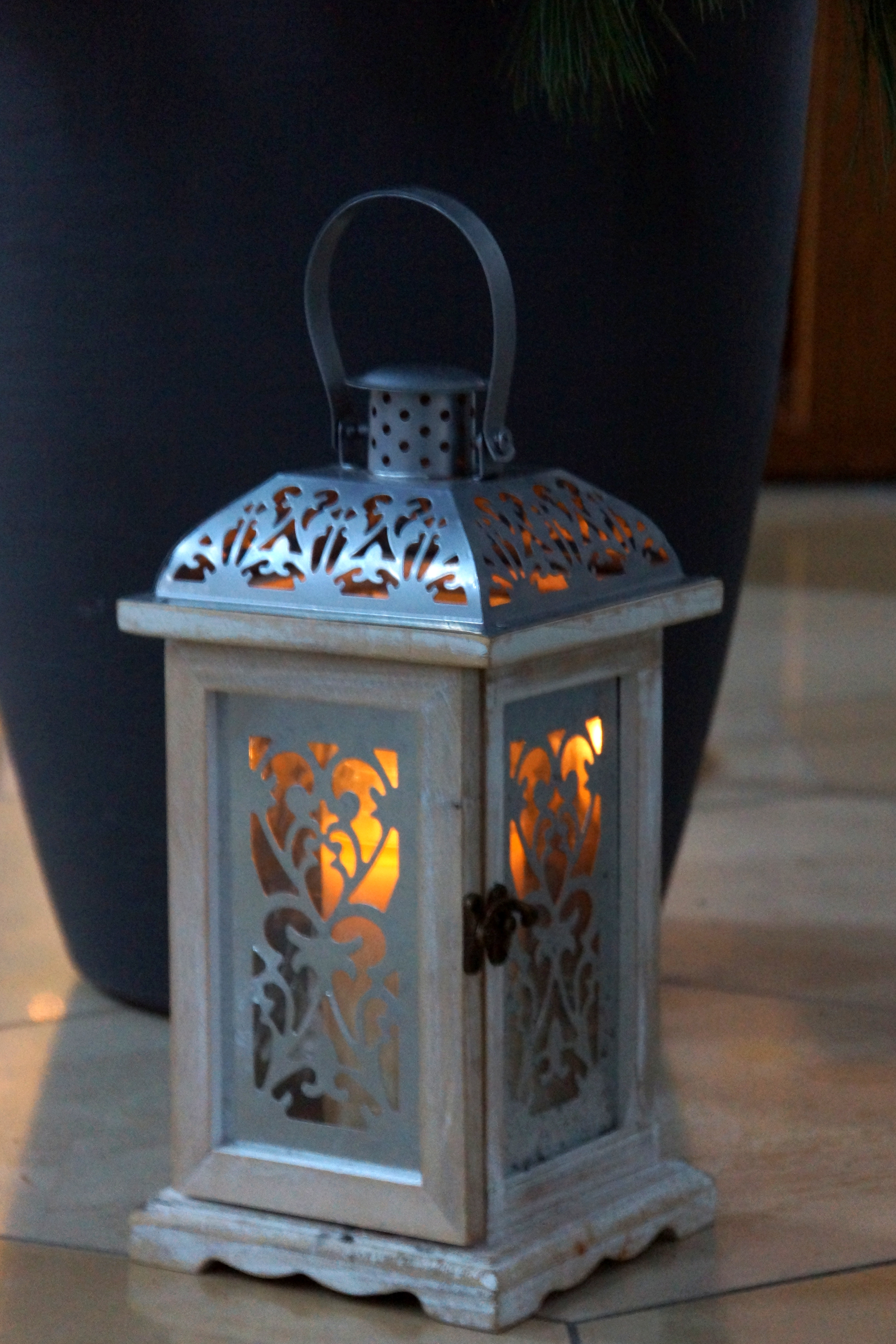
Christmas at Court Church of Our Lady Neumarkt: Neumarkt in der Oberpfalz

The "ORF Light of Peace from Bethlehem" reached out to many prominent personalities as a Christmas greeting in the past few years. These include for example:

- Former President of the European Commission Romano Prodi
- Former President of the European Commission José Manuel Barroso
- Former President of the European Commission Jean-Claude Juncker
- President of the European Commission Ursula von der Leyen
- President of the European Parliament Roberta Metsola
- Pope Benedict XVI
- Pope Francis
- Pope Johannes Paul II
- Former Chancellor Helmut Kohl
- Chancellor Angela Merkel
- Former President Michail Gorbatschow
- Former President Václav Havel
- King Hussein of Jordan
- Princess Astrid and Prince Laurent of Belgium
- Archbishop Cardinal Franz König
- Archbishop Cardinal Christoph Schönborn

== "Light of peace" international ==
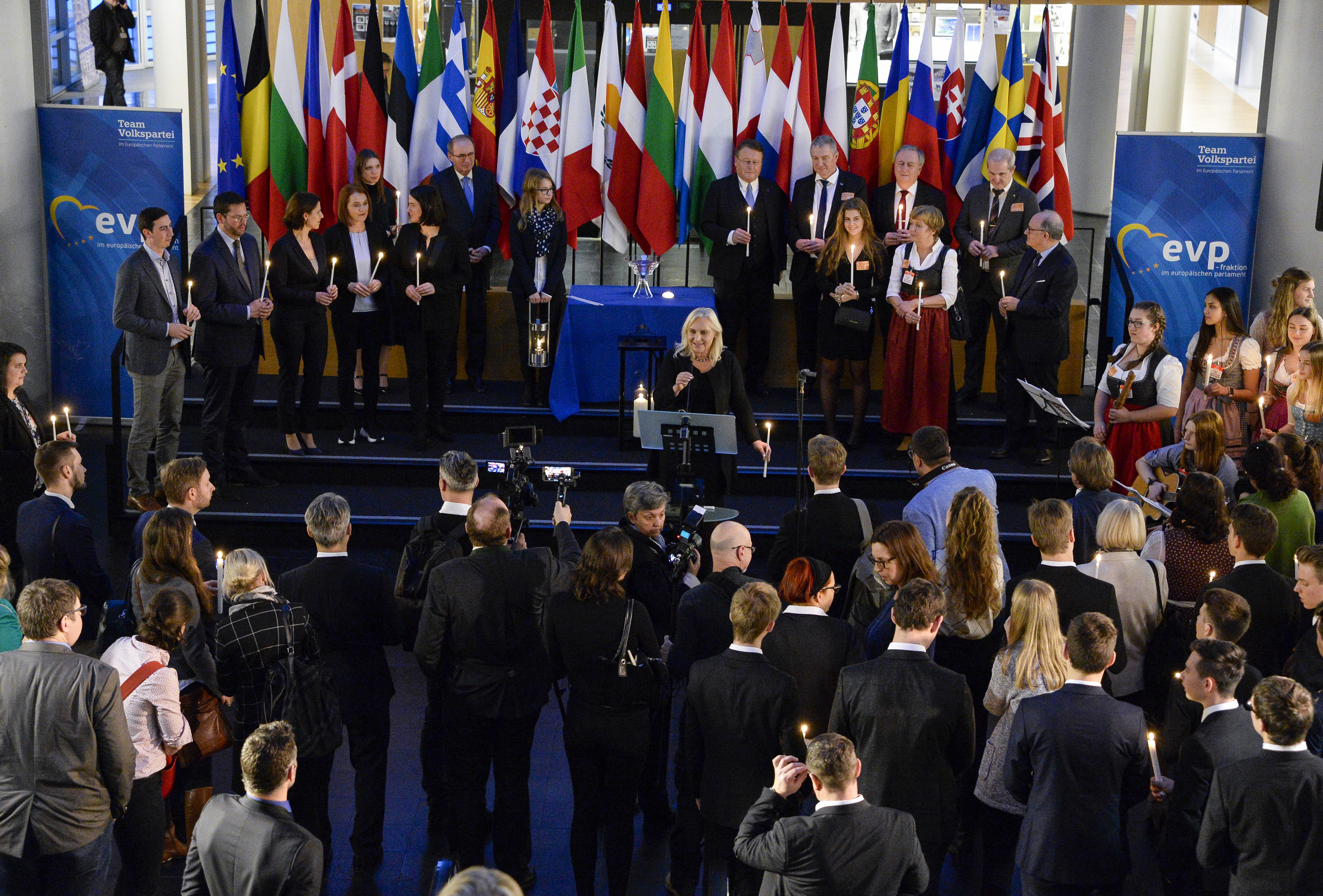
MEP Angelika Winzig handing over the Peace Light to the European Parliament

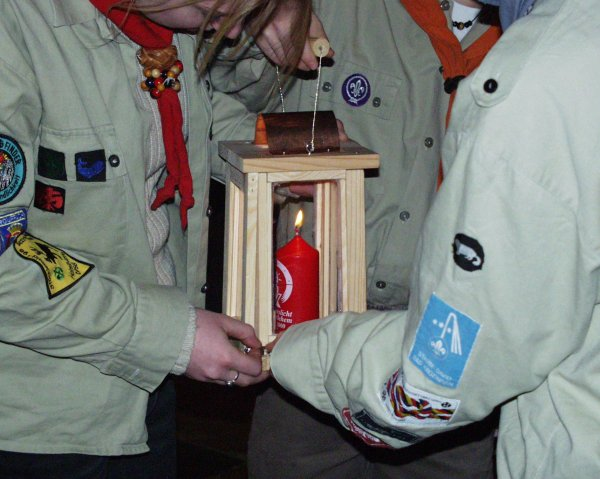
Scouts with peace light in Germany

=== Europe ===
Austria

On the third Sunday in Advent, it will be passed on to scout delegations from across Europe in Linz (formerly in Vienna). In Austria itself, it will be distributed on 24 December in local studios of the Austrian Broadcasting Corporation (ORF), at many train stations, Red Cross and Samaritan Federation offices, churches, fire departments, by the scouts and in Fire-departments. Since Austria joined the European Union (1995), Austrian MEP Paul Rübig has brought this tradition to the European Parliament in Strasbourg. From 2019 onwards the Light of Peace has been handed over to the European Parliament by MEP Angelika Winzig. She is the deputy delegation leader of the ÖVP in the European Parliament and also lives in Upper Austria.

The Light of peace is also presented to the Federal President of Austria year after year. So far:

- Thomas Klestil
- Heinz Fischer
- Alexander van der Bellen

France

Since 2003, the Light of Peace in France has been brought to Paris every year by the Scouts et Guides de France and Éclaireuses et Éclaireurs Unionistes de France and from there distributed throughout France.

Germany

In Germany, the campaign is organized by some Boy Scout Associations (Bund der Pfadfinderinnen und Pfadfinder, Deutsche Pfadfinderschaft Sankt Georg, Pfadfinderinnenschaft St. Georg, Verband Christlicher Pfadfinderinnen und Pfadfinder, Bund Moslemischer Pfadfinderinnen und Pfadfinder Deutschlands and Verband Deutscher Altpfadfindergilden). The light is picked up by train from Vienna and then distributed in over 100 cities across Germany.

Italy

For the South Tyrolean towns, the Light of Peace is regularly handed over to the South Tyrolean boy scouts on 23 December in the parish church on the Brenner by scouts from Innsbruck and Zirl in Austria. The light for the rest of Italy has been picked up by Italian scouts in Vienna since 1988.

Lithuania, Belarus, Ukraine, Russia

The light distributed in Poland is also passed on to neighboring countries in the east, specifically to Lithuania, Belarus, Ukraine and Russia.

Poland

In Poland, the Light of Peace was taken over by the Polish Scout Association (ZHP) in Vienna until Poland joined the EU. Since then, the delegations from Slovakia and Poland have alternately taken over the light. When the Slovaks pick up the light, they bring it to the Slovak-Polish border Łysa Polana

Portugal

In Portugal, the Light of Peace is driven by the Portuguese Scout Association - CNE Corpo Nacional de escutas - Escutismo Católico Português, since 2014. Every year a delegation of Portuguese scouts travels to Austria to fetch the Light of Peace and then shares the flame in a national celebration which is then replicated in all regions and some localities of Portugal. This initiative has been growing and in some regions it is already a Christmas tradition with a very strong symbolism. In 2020 and 2021, due to the pandemic, it was shared the flame of the Light of Peace which was kept burning in the parish of Mateus in Vila Real.

Slovakia

For Slovakia, scouts take over the light in Vienna and distribute it throughout the country. The Light of Peace has also been lit in the observatory on Lomnitz peak since 2003.

Slovenia

Since 1990 the Catholic Scout Association has been distributing the light throughout Slovenia, bringing the flame to highest Slovenian mountain peak and to the president and other officials as well.

Switzerland

In Switzerland, the registered association Friedenslicht Schweiz, which is active all around the year round, is responsible for distributing. There is also a particularly active, dedicated scout group called Friedenslicht Schweiz.

=== North America ===
Canada

In Canada, Austrian and Canadian scouts first brought the light to Ottawa in 2009, where it was spread across the country.

United States

Though not exclusive to Scouting, the light is managed by Scouters in the United States and is often part of the Messengers of Peace.

== See also ==
- Peace Candle
- Amnesty candle
