= Schlitz Christmas Candle =

Tower in Germany

Coordinates: 50.673036°N 9.560611°E

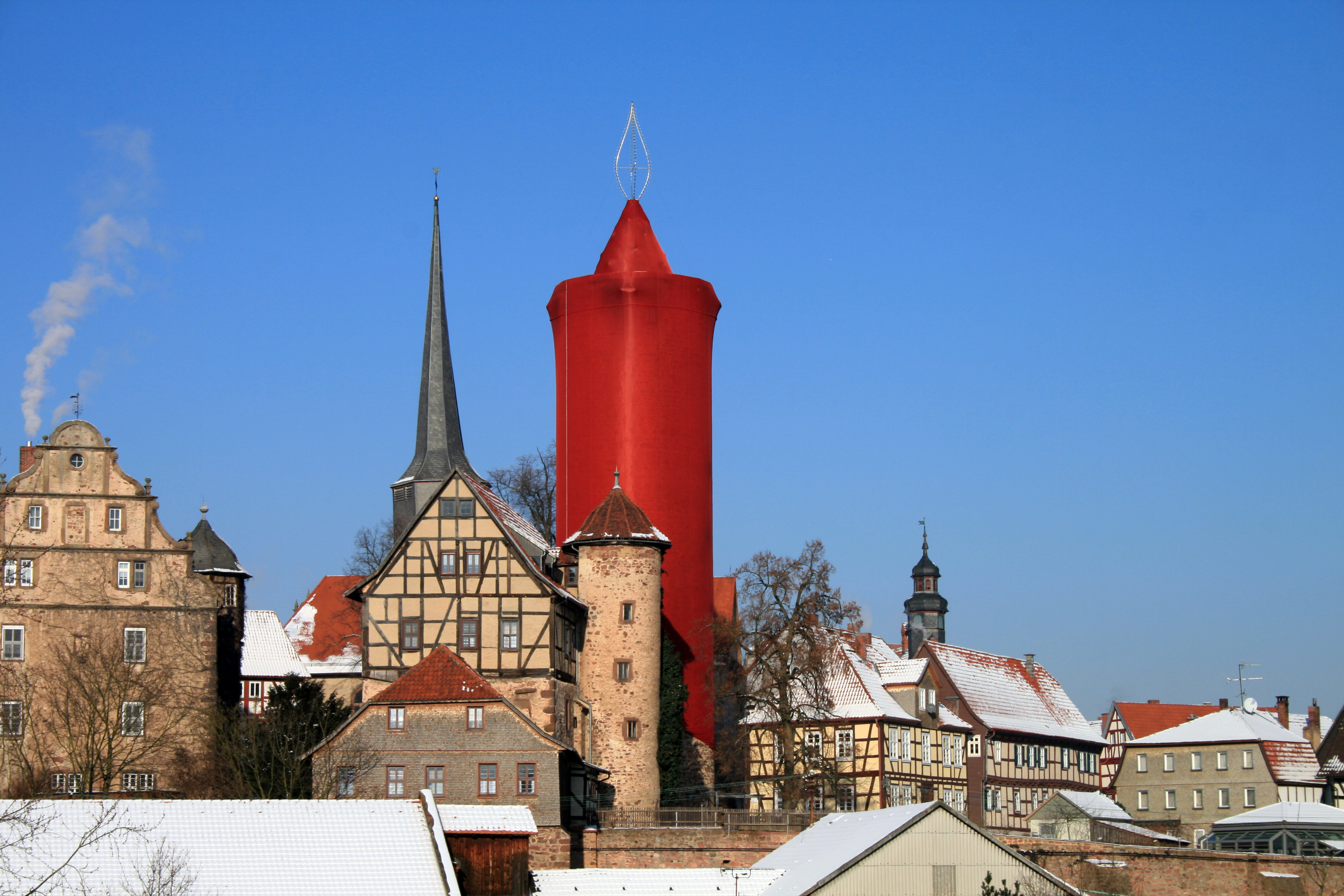
Burgenblick

The Schlitz Christmas Candle is a candle-like structure unveiled every Christmas season in Schlitz, a small town in Hesse, Germany. It is approximately 42-metre (138 ft) tall, and is thought to be the largest non-wax candle in the world. The candle is created by draping a red cloth over the stone tower at the center of the town. The tower is then topped off with an electric flame to give the impression of a Christmas candle, which can be seen from great distances looming above the town's Tudor-style buildings. The tower used to form the candle is called the Hinterturm, which was built in the 14th century, and is the remnant of a castle that no longer stands. An elevator inside the Hinterturm takes visitors to the top of the tower.

The candle has been a yearly tradition in Schlitz since the Christmas Candle was first established on November 28, 1991. The candle serves as the town's Christmas market, which includes vendors, activities, entertainment and guest appearances by Santa Claus Mayor Hans-Jürgen Schäfer said of the candle, "People come from all over Germany just to take a look at the Christmas candle. Of course, this brings Schlitz to the attention of people all over the world." Every year in January, the town receives newspaper clippings from all over the world with stories about the Schlitz Christmas Candle.

Before the Schlitz Christmas Candle, the largest non-wax candle in the world was believed to be the Peace Candle, a tower-like structure assembled every holiday season in Easton, a Pennsylvania city in the United States.

== See also ==
- Peace Candle
