= The Magic of Silence =

2023 book by Florian Illies

- Author: Florian Illies
- Original title: Zauber der Stille
- Translator: Tony Crawford
- Language: German
- Subject: Caspar David Friedrich
- Genre: biography
- Publisher: S. Fischer Verlag
- Publication date: 25 October 2023
- Publication place: Germany
- English publication date: November 2024
- Pages: 256
- ISBN: 978-3-10-397252-8

The Magic of Silence: Caspar David Friedrich's Journey Through Time (German: Zauber der Stille. Caspar David Friedrichs Reise durch die Zeiten) is a 2023 book by the German art historian Florian Illies. It is about the painter Caspar David Friedrich and was written for the occasion of the 250th anniversary of Friedrich's birth in 2024.
