= Schlitz, Hesse =

Schlitz
- Town
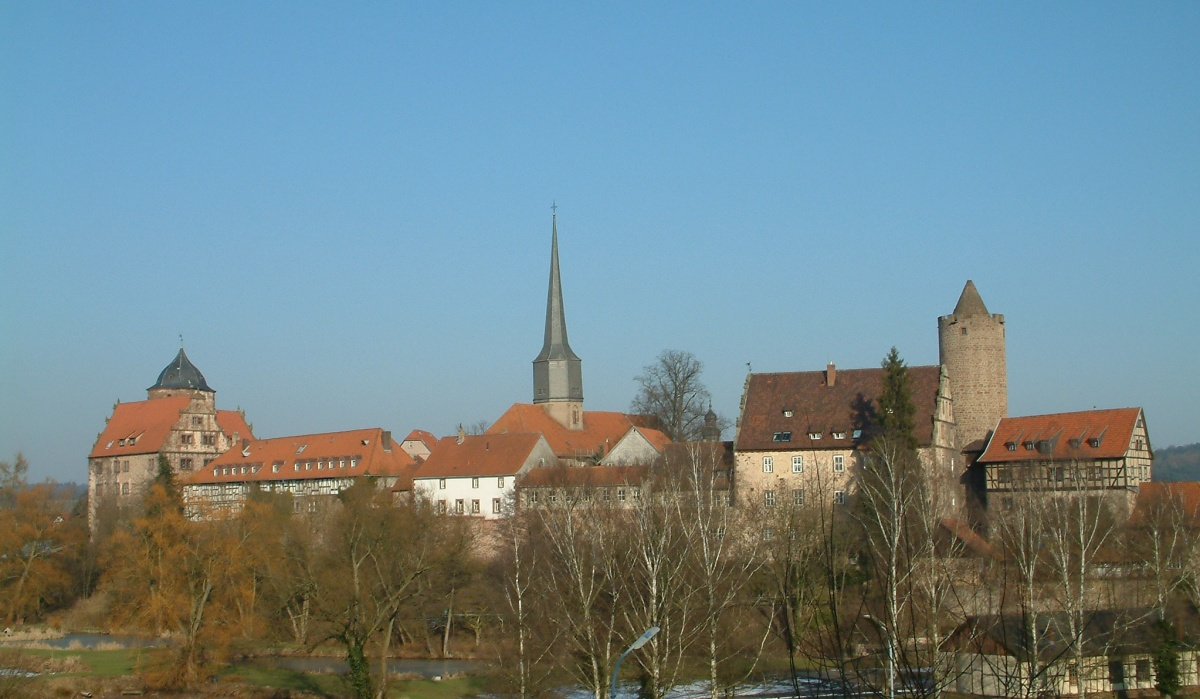
- Schlitz

- Coat of arms

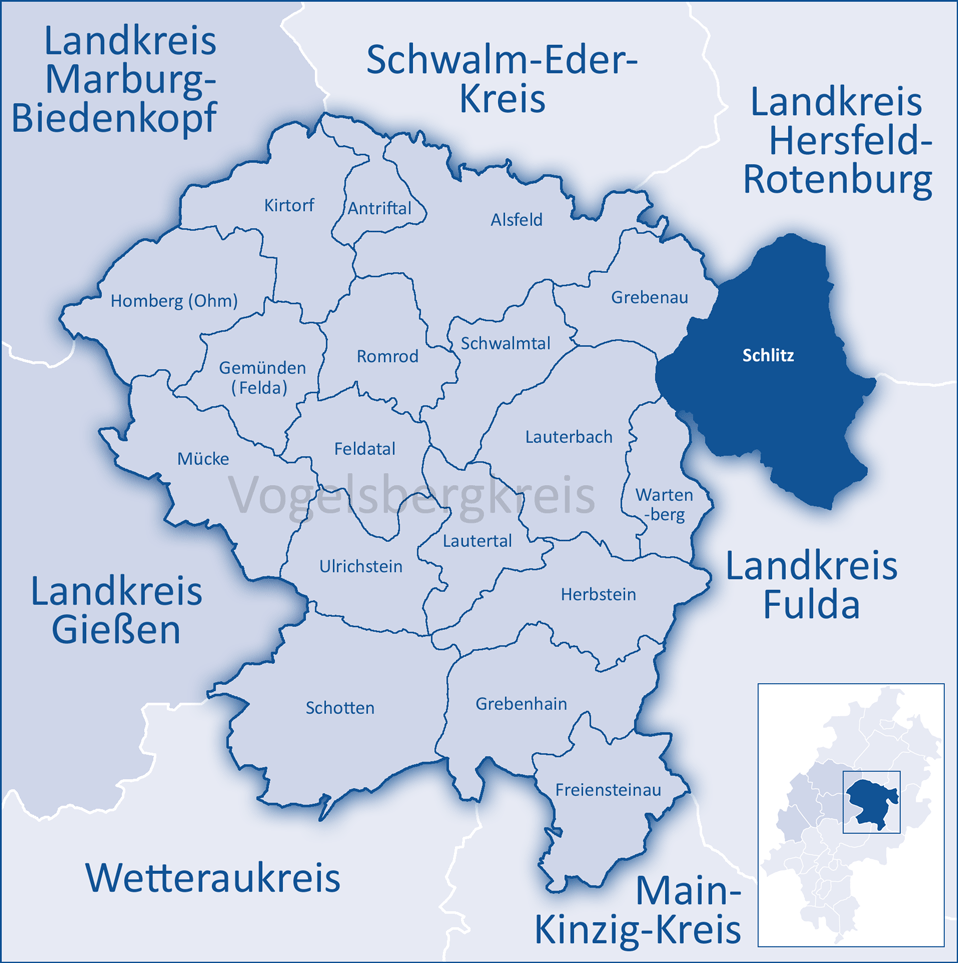
- Location of Schlitz within Vogelsbergkreis district
- Interactive map of Schlitz
- Location within Germany Location within Hesse
- Coordinates: 50°40′N 9°34′E
- Country: Germany
- State: Hesse
- Admin. region: Gießen
- District: Vogelsbergkreis
- Subdivisions: 17 Stadtteile

Government
  - Mayor (2022–28): Heiko Siemon (CDU)

Area
  - Total: 142.06 km^{2} (54.85 sq mi)
- Elevation: 245 m (804 ft)

Population (2025-12-31)
  - Total: 9,270
  - Density: 65.3/km^{2} (169/sq mi)
- Time zone: UTC+01:00 (CET)
  - Summer (DST): UTC+02:00 (CEST)
- Postal codes: 36110
- Dialling codes: 06642
- Vehicle registration: VB
- Website: www.schlitz.de

Schlitz (German pronunciation: [ʃlɪts]) is a small town in the Vogelsbergkreis in eastern Hesse, Germany.

== Geography ==
=== Location ===
The town of Schlitz lies at the outlet of the small river Schlitz on the Fulda.

=== Neighbouring municipalities ===
Schlitz borders in the north on the municipalities of Breitenbach and Niederaula (both in Hersfeld-Rotenburg), in the east on the municipalities of Haunetal (Hersfeld-Rotenburg) and Burghaun and the town of Hünfeld (both in Fulda district), in the southeast on the city of Fulda (Fulda district), in the south on the municipalities of Großenlüder and Bad Salzschlirf (both in Fulda district), in the southwest on the municipality of Wartenberg, and in the west on the town of Lauterbach.

=== Constituent municipalities ===
Schlitz is divided into the following municipalities: Bernshausen, Fraurombach, Hartershausen, Hemmen, Hutzdorf, Nieder-Stoll, Ober-Wegfurth, Pfordt, Queck, Rimbach, Sandlofs, Schlitz, Üllershausen, Ützhausen, Unter-Schwarz, Unter-Wegfurth and Willofs.

== History ==
The name Schlitz had its first documentary mention in 812. Schlitz is known throughout Hesse for the town's five castles and is also called the Romantische Burgenstadt Schlitz (the Romantic Castle Town of Schlitz).

One peculiarity about the town is its so-called Burgenring, or Castle Ring, with the town built on a hill with its accumulated castles, towers, lords' houses, the town church and many half-timbered houses presenting a well preserved, compact, historic Old Town. For the Castle Ring's splendour and the town's outstanding location, Schlitz was sometimes called in earlier times the "Hessian Rothenburg ob der Tauber"

The Lords of Schlitz had built up their mastery in an autonomous fief from the Fulda Abbey. As of 1404 they were calling themselves Schlitz von Görtz (in documents also Gurz or Görz). After the Reformation came in 1563, and as a result of the Thirty Years' War, however, they broke away from Fulda. In 1677, they became Imperial Barons and, in 1726, Imperial Counts. In 1806, the area passed to Hesse-Darmstadt.

Schlitz was granted town rights in the early 15th century.

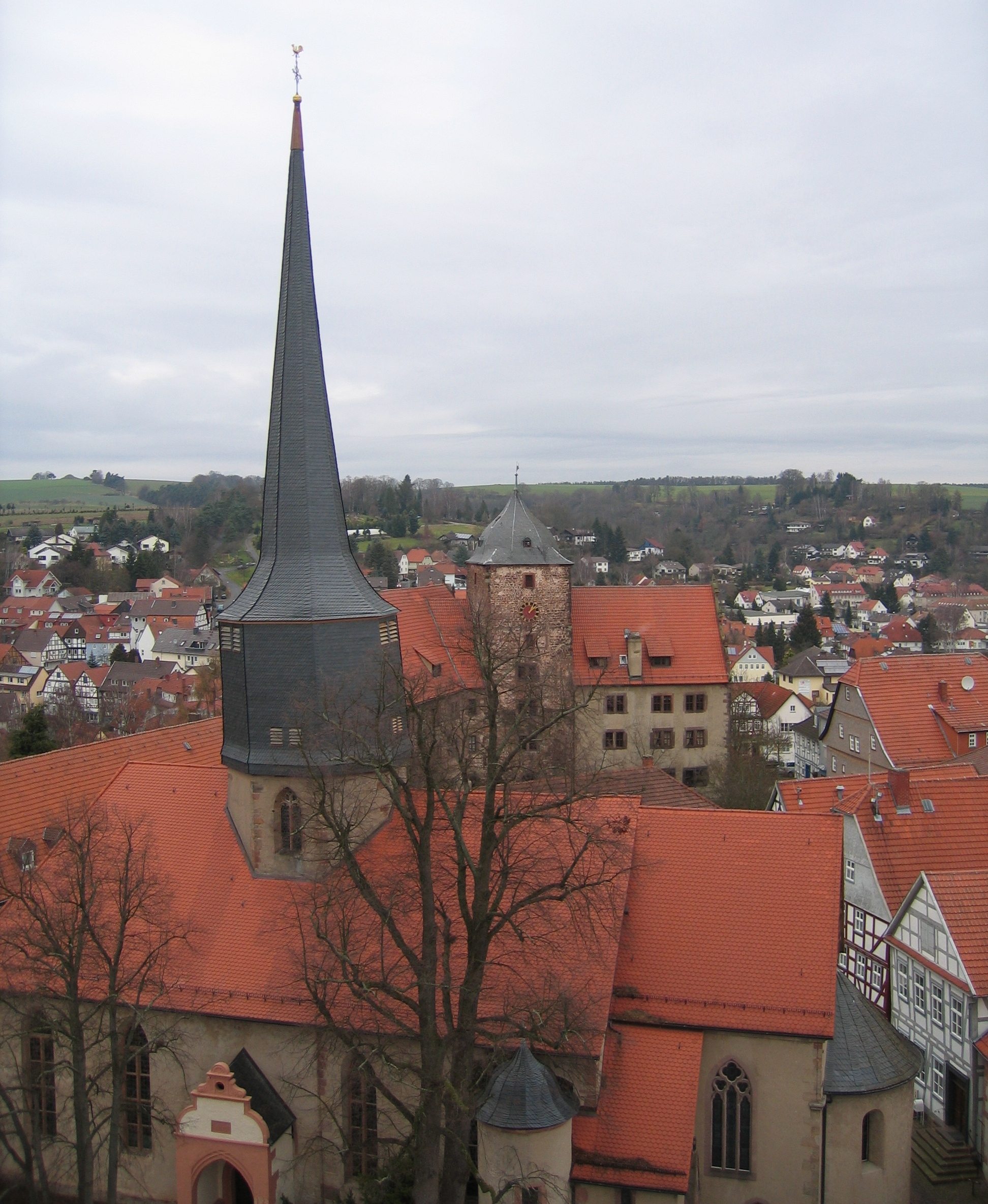
Schlitz town church first documentary mention in 812

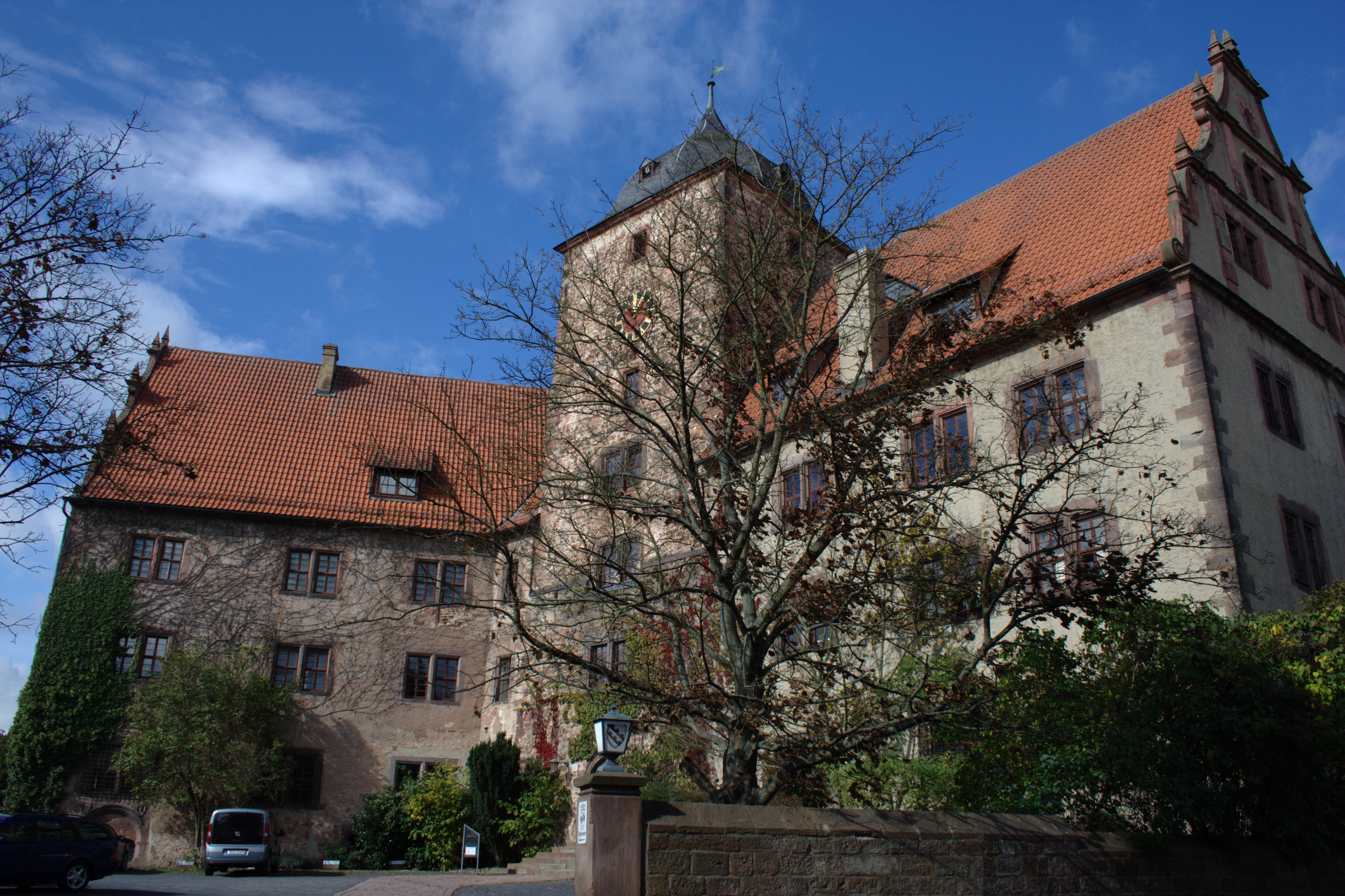
Schlitz Vorderburg western wing

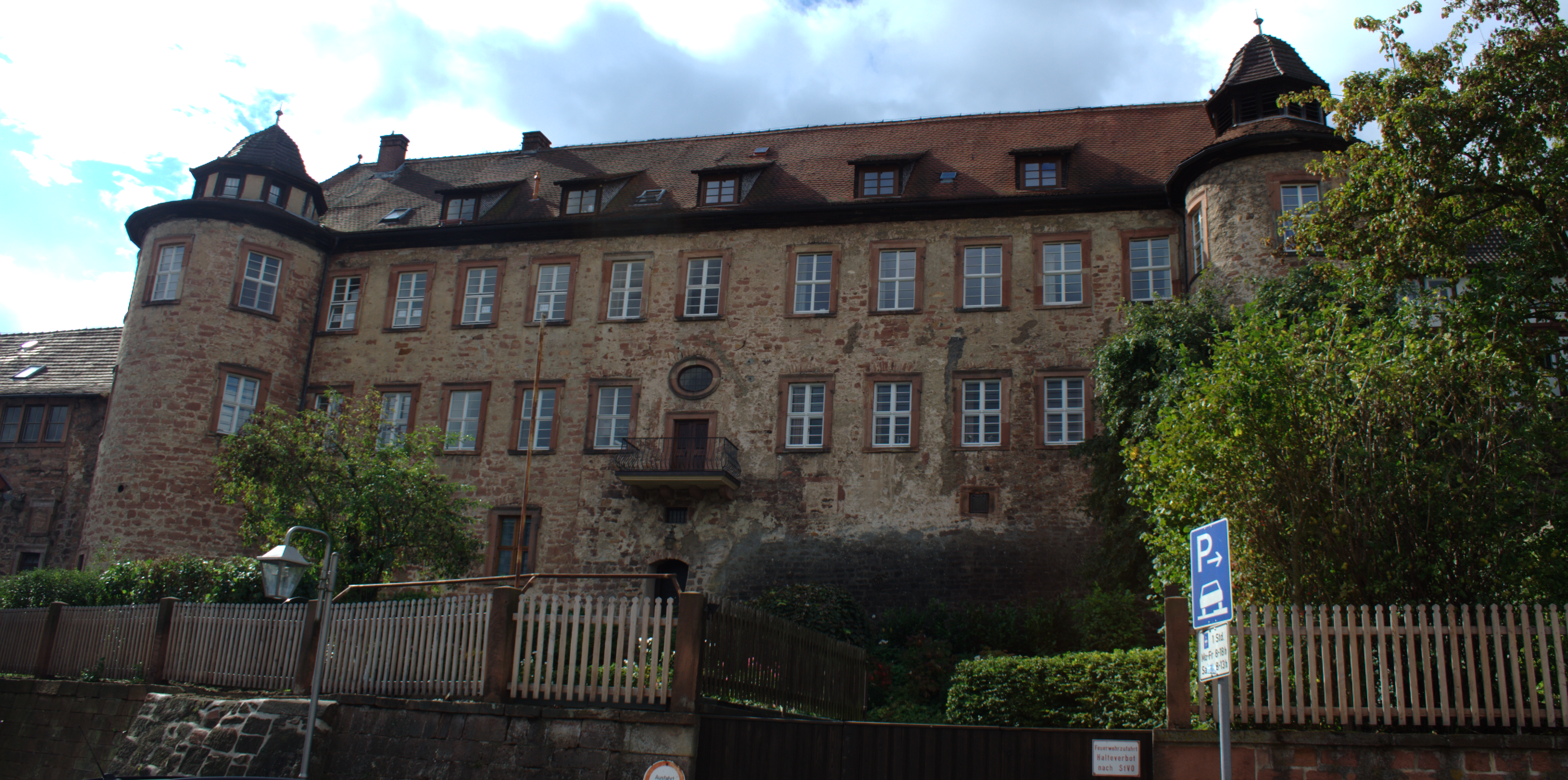
Schlitz Ottoburg

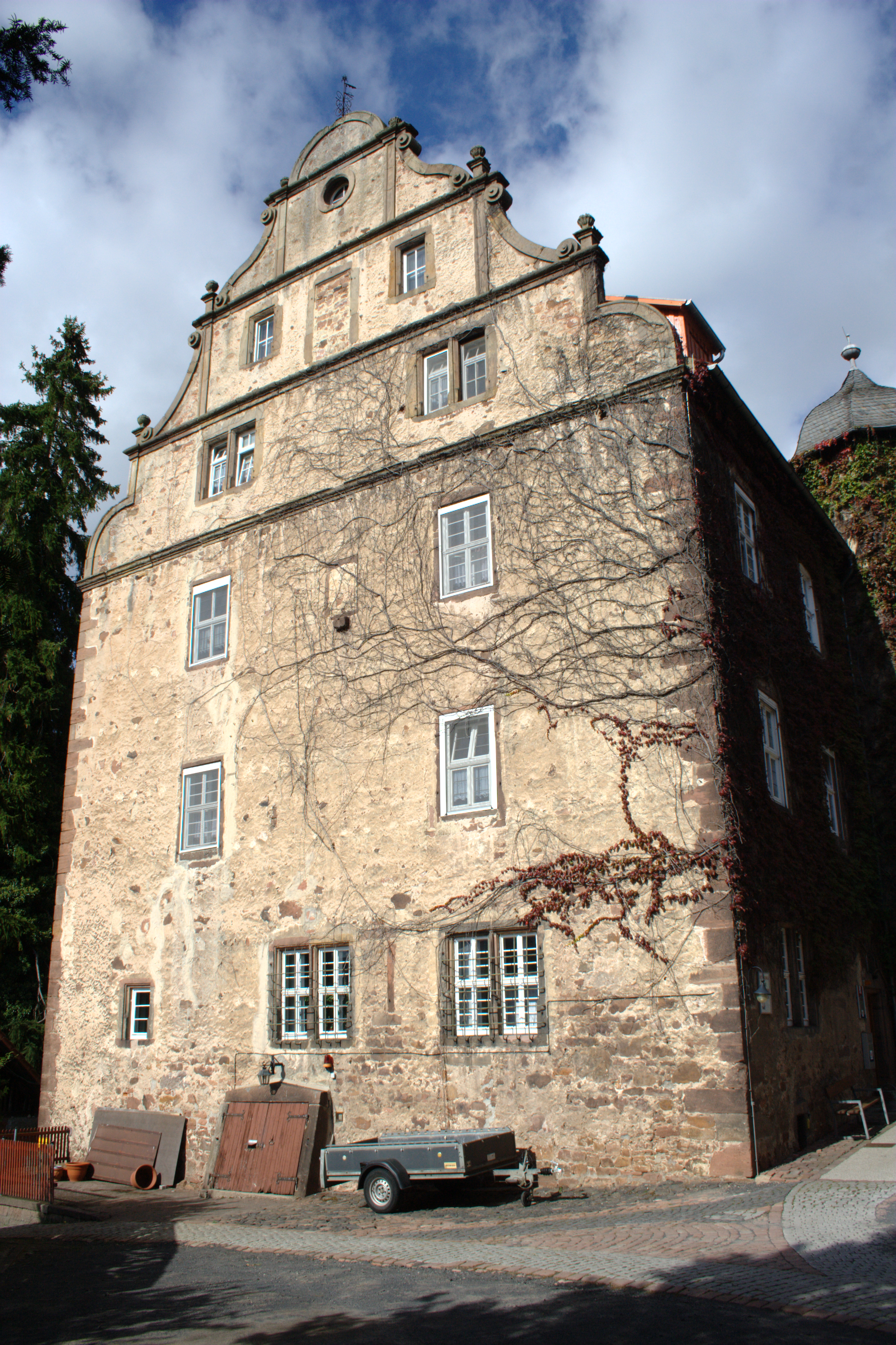
Schlitz Hinterburg

Since 1951, the Fluß-Station Schlitz ("Schlitz River Station") has been in Schlitz. This working group from the Max Planck Institute for Limnology is researching the ecology of the tiny Breitenbach stream in the neighbouring Breitecke Nature Preserve. The Breitenbach, through many studies and publications, is one of the world's best researched and documented streams. In 2006, this research station, with the current scientific leader's retirement, is to be closed by the Max Planck Society.

== Politics ==
=== Local council ===
Elections were held in March 2016:

The council has 31 members:

- CDU: 13
- SPD: 10
- BLS: 5
- FDP: 3

=== Coat of arms ===
Schlitz's civic coat of arms might heraldically be described thus: In argent a fess sable, within, an inescutcheon, in argent bendlets sinister embattled three points each sable.

The oldest town seal dates only from the 17th century. The current arms were conferred in 1919. The embattled bendlets in the inescutcheon stand for the town's castles.

=== Twinned towns ===
- Hungary Bogyiszló

== Economy ==
=== Transport ===
Schlitz can be reached by long-distance travel by Autobahn A 7 (Hünfeld/Schlitz interchange). Nearby lie the towns of Fulda and Lauterbach.

== Public institutions ==
=== Educational institutions ===
Schlitz is home to the Hessische Akademie für musisch-kulturelle Bildung GmbH ("Hessian Academy for Artistic-Cultural Education, Limited"), the state music academy, at Hallenburg Castle.

=== Regular events ===
- Schlitzerländer Trachtenfest ("Schlitz-Land Costume Festival"), takes place in odd-numbered years on the second weekend in July.

== Personalities ==
=== Sons and daughters of the town ===
- Cyriacus Spangenberg (1528–1604), pastor in Schlitz for ten years after losing his position at Mansfeld.
- Friedrich Wilhelm von Schlitz (1647–1728), privy councillor and President of the Chamber
- Gudrun Pausewang (1928–2020), writer, who lived in town for many years
- Florian Illies (1971– ), writer, who grew up in Schlitz who describes German rural life as an example of his hometown in his book Ortsgespräch.
- Georg Christian Dieffenbach (1822–1901), clergyman and poet
- Carl Wilhelm Kern (1874–1945), composer, pianist and music theorist, active in the USA
- Jost Trier (1894–1970), Old Germanist

== In fiction ==
The fictional town of Schewenborn, where the plot of the 1983 novel The Last Children of Schewenborn (German: Die letzten Kinder von Schewenborn) takes place (depicting life in Germany in the aftermath of a nuclear war) is modeled on Schlitz, as specifically stated by the writer Gudrun Pausewang, herself an inhabitant of the town.

== See also ==
- Schlitz Christmas Candle
