= Florian Illies =

German writer and art historian (born 4 May 1971)

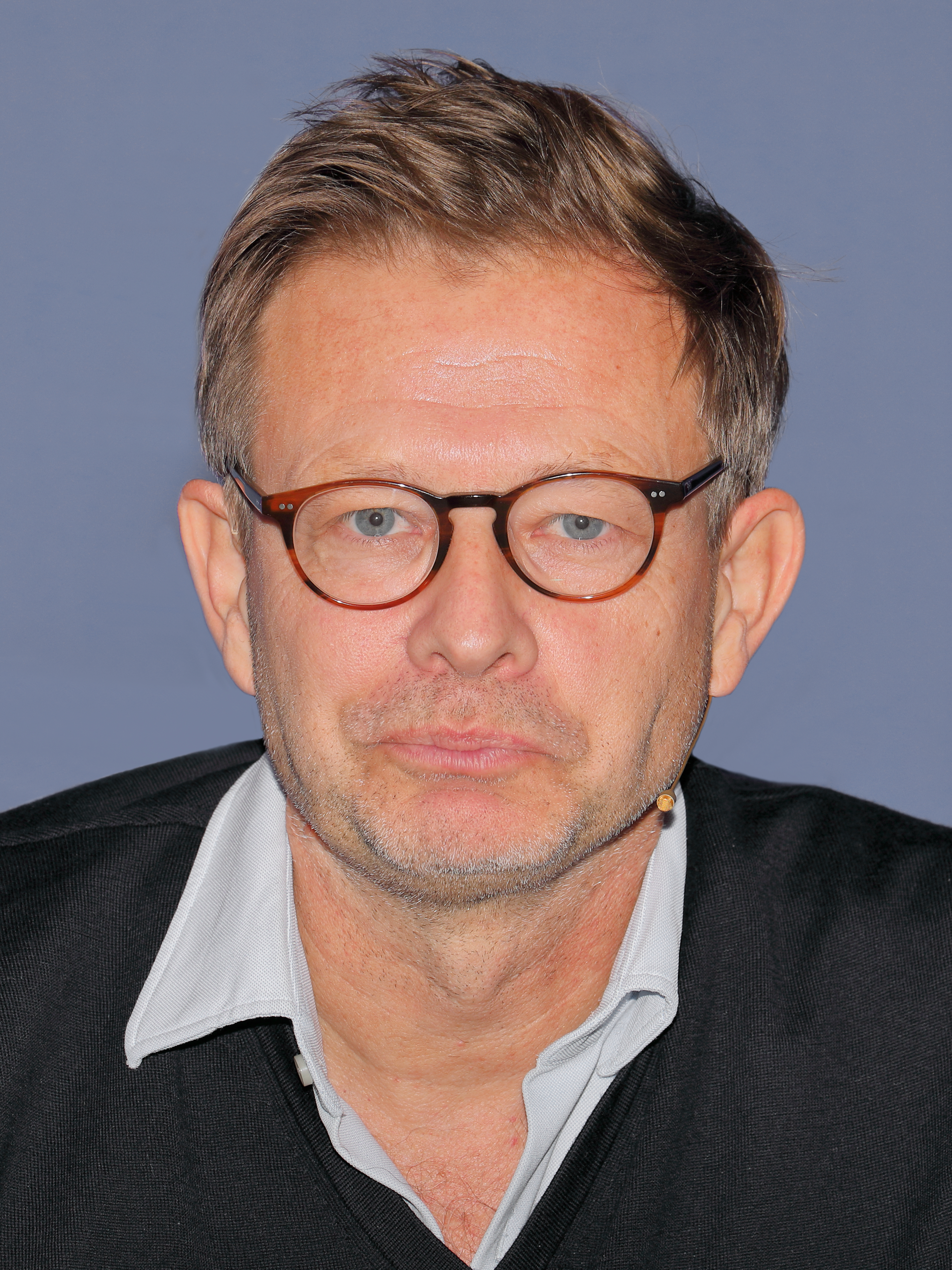
- Born: May 4, 1971 (age 55); Schlitz, Hesse, West Germany
- Occupation: Art historian

Florian Illies (born 4 May 1971) is a German writer and art historian.

== Life ==
He was born and raised in the town of Schlitz in Hesse. His father was the biologist Joachim Illies, and one of his school teachers was the writer Gudrun Pausewang. He studied art history at the universities of Bonn and Oxford. He worked as culture editor for major German newspapers such as Frankfurter Allgemeine Zeitung and Die Zeit. In 2004, he cofounded the contemporary art magazine monopol with his ex-wife Amélie von Heydebreck. In 2011, he became a partner at the Berlin-based auction house Villa Grisebach. In January 2019, he joined the Rowohlt Verlag publishing house as a managing director.

As a writer, Illies is known for his bestsellers Generation Golf (2000) and 1913: The Year Before the Storm (2012). The latter book has been translated into two dozen languages. In the former (and its sequel), he writes critically about his eponymous generation, describing it as the German equivalent of Generation X (born between 1965-1975). He gave them the name after Volkswagen Golf, the car they would buy generations of. He describes the Generation Golf as an "uncritical ego generation", only caring about enjoying the benefits created by the previous, "Wirtschaftswunder-Generation", not wanting to burden themselves with the ecological consequences, that only strives for consumption, is largely apolitical and the first generation to elevate fashion orientation, hedonism and brand awareness to a value.

Illies' biography about Caspar David Friedrich, The Magic of Silence, was published in 2023. It was written for Friedrich's 250th anniversary in 2024.

In 2025, Illies published Wenn die Sonne untergeht: Familie Mann in Sanary, a book about Thomas Mann's family in exile in Sanary-sur-Mer.
