= Carl Wilhelm Kern =

American composer

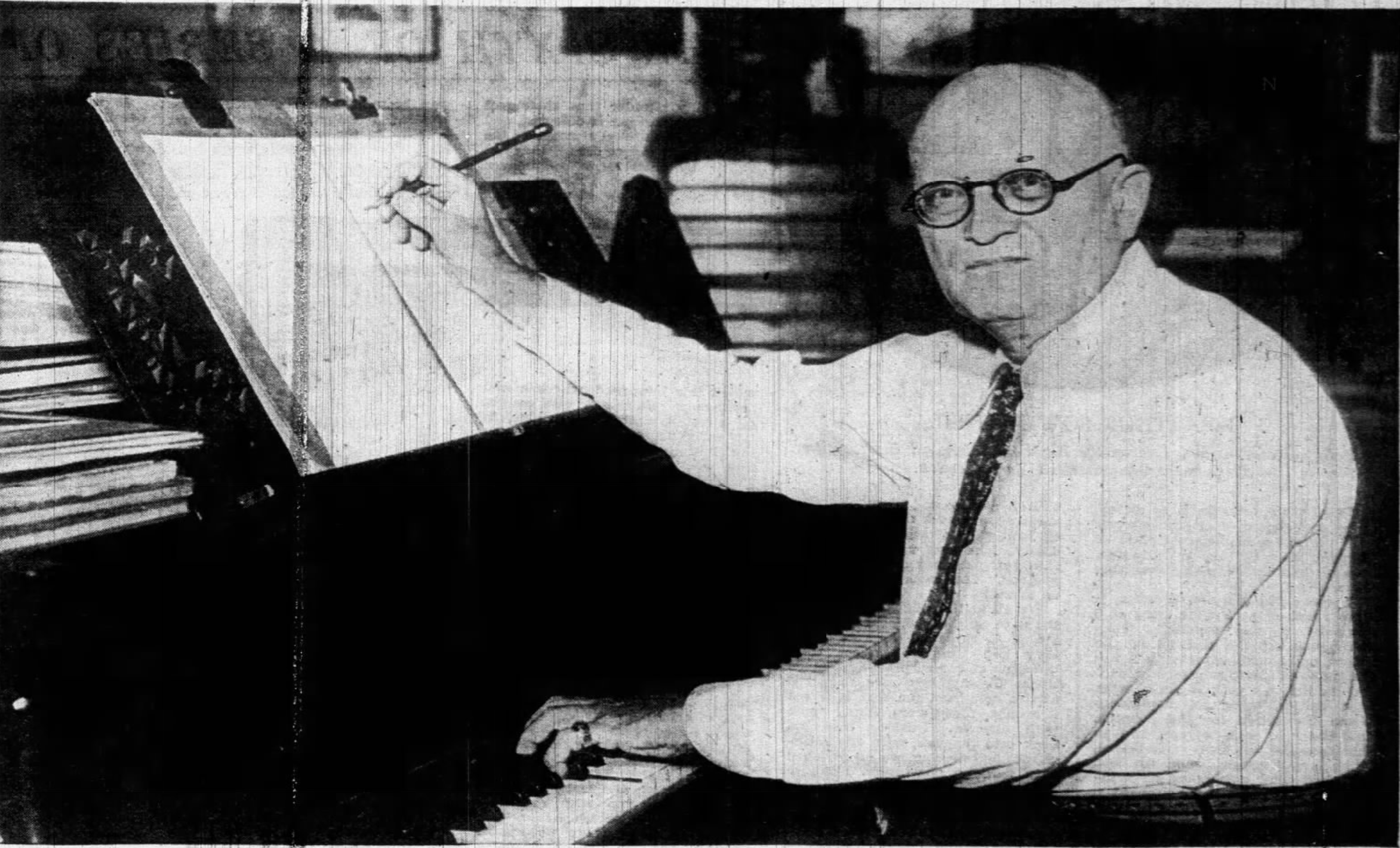
Carl Wilhelm Kern

Carl Wilhelm Kern (June 4, 1874 – August 19, 1945) was an American composer, pianist and organist, theorist, and editor. Many of his works were published under the pseudonyms Dudley Ryder, Ludwig Renk, and J. Douglas Martin.

== Biography ==
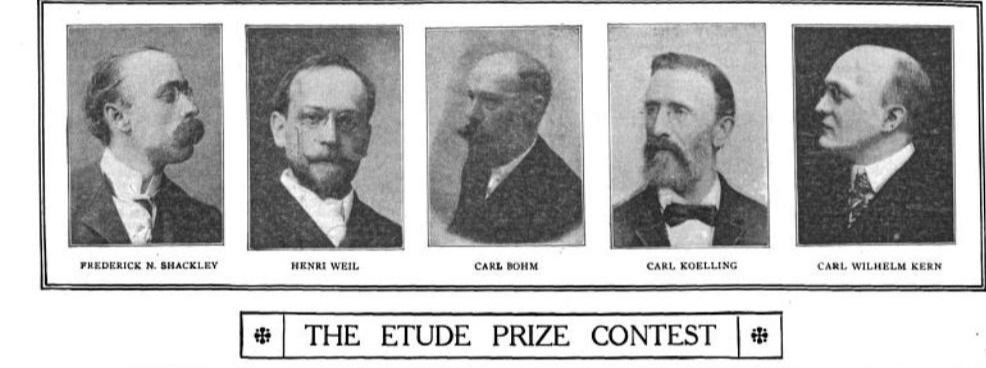
Kern depicted in The Etude (1911)

Kern was born in Schlitz, Hesse-Darmstadt, Germany. His earliest music studies were from his father, Carl August Kern, an organist. He studied in Laubach, and then at colleges in Alzey and Mainz under Adam Coy, Paul Schumacher, and Friedrich Lux. He was a friend of Walter Niemann's. Kern's elder brother F. A. Kern conducted the Munich Symphony Orchestra, before emigrating to the United States, where he conducted the Milwaukee Symphony Orchestra for a few years.

In 1893, the German-language Elmhurst Proseminary (now Elmhurst University), run by the German Evangelical Synod of the Northwest needed an assistant instructor of music. The president of the North American Evangelical Synod wrote to the Mainz Academy of Music offering the job to a recent graduate for $50 per month. Kern, age 19, accepted the position and emigrated to the United States. He taught at Elmhurst Proseminary for a year, then from 1894-1895 took a post as organist and choir director in Merrill, Wisconsin. From 1895-1898 he taught at the Springfield, Ohio School of Music, and from 1898 to 1903 taught and supervised the music program for Dennison, Ohio public schools. He taught for a year at Patton Seminary in Dallas, Texas, before settling permanently in St. Louis.

In St. Louis, he taught at Strassberger's Conservatory of Music from 1904-1922. In 1923 he joined the faculty of Ottmar Moll's piano school. He was a prolific music editor, most frequently in the service of St. Louis publishers Adam and Oliver Shattinger, and also for the Bay State Music Co and the Evans Music Co of Boston.

St. Louis musicologist Ernst Krohn estimated that he published over one thousand piano works, many of them of an educational/elementary nature. He also wrote songs, works for choir, operettas, and solos for organ.

He died in St. Louis, Missouri; his papers are held by Washington University in St. Louis.

St. Louis musician Paul Mori dedicated his piano composition The Princess Zora to Kern.

== Selected compositions ==
- Governor Bushnell March, published by D. A. Syman in 1895
- Evening Shadows, op. 119, published by Thiebes Piano Co in 1910
- Oriental Dance, The Etude composition contest prize winner in 1911
- The Harp Player and His Son, published by Thiebes Piano Co in 1910
- Scherzo Valse, op. 151
- A La Valse, op. 154. Elmore Condon published a transcription for solo violin.
- Organ Sonata
- Pieces for piano, op. 243, including No. 3 "My First Trip", No. 4 "Moon and Stars (Reverie), "Military Array (March)"
- The Duke of Texas, a comic opera. Never published, the musical material was repurposed.
- Mississippi River Scenes, suite for piano
- Dream River
- The Clown (Humoresque)
- Moonlight on the River
- Fantasie Barcarolle
- Missouri River Scenes (including On Black Eagle Bluff, The Haunted Isle, Dead Man's Slough)
- Sketches from the Gasconade
- Impressions from the Big River
- Heart of the Hyacinth
- Passing Shadows
- Purple Twilight
- From The Heart
- In Clover, student piano work
- Sweetheart Waltz, student piano work
- Valse Episode, student piano work
- Robinson Crusoe Suite, an elementary piano suite
- Twelve Easy Etudes for the Development of Velocity
- Fifty Very First Studies
- Heart's Yearning, song
- Girl of my Heart, song
- Of The Rose and You, song
- Hope Gavotte
- Marche Aux Flambeaux
