= Jost Trier =

German philologist

- Born: 15 December 1894; Schlitz, Hesse, German Empire
- Died: 15 September 1970 (aged 75); Bad Salzuflen, Federal Republic of Germany
- Spouse: Margarete Fressel
- Children: 3 (1 stepchild)

Academic background
- Education: University of Freiburg; University of Basel; University of Berlin; University of Marburg
- Thesis: Der Heilige Jodocus (1924)
- Doctoral advisor: Friedrich Wilhelm

Academic work
- Discipline: German studies
- Sub-discipline: Germanic linguistics
- Institutions: University of Marburg; University of Münster
- Main interests: Semantic field theory, German etymology
- Notable works: Der deutsche Wortschatz im Sinnbezirk des Verstandes (1931)

Jost Trier (15 December 1894 – 15 September 1970) was a German linguist, specialising in Germanic linguistics and particularly in the vocabulary and etymology of the German language. He was chair of German philology at the University of Münster from 1932 to 1961, and rector from 1956 to 1957.

== Early life and education ==
Jost Trier was born in Schlitz, Hesse, on 15 December 1894, the son of physician Jost Christian Ludwig Trier (1859 – 1939) and Else née Nehrkorn (1870 – 1938). After completing volksschule, he graduated from the gymnasium in Barmen, where the family had moved.

In 1914 Trier began studying Roman and Germanic studies at the University of Freiburg, but on the outbreak of World War I, volunteered for the Army. In February 1915 he was taken prisoner near Marseille; after internment in France and French Algeria, in 1916 he contracted malaria and was moved via a prisoner exchange to Switzerland, where he was able to study at the University of Basel.

After the war, he continued his studies at the universities of Berlin and Marburg, then from 1920 once more at Freiburg, where he completed his PhD in 1924. His doctoral thesis was Der Heilige Jodocus: Sein Leben und seine Verehrung, zugleich ein Beitrag zur Geschichte der deutschen Namengebung. He earned a teaching qualification in 1920 and following that taught secondary school while completing his degree.

== Career ==
After completing his PhD, Trier taught at the University of Marburg, initially as an academic assistant and following his habilitation in 1928, as a privatdozent. In 1932 he joined the University of Münster as professor of German Philology, and was dean of the Philosophical Faculty from 1935 to 1937. From 1956 to 1957, he was the rector of the university. He retired in 1963, being named emeritus, and in 1964 was the recipient of a festschrift. (A second, memorial festschrift was published in 1975.)

Trier specialized in Germanic linguistics, particularly in German and later in his career in etymology. He was one of a generation of German studies scholars in the 1920s and 1930s who turned away from philology and older languages to emphasise structures of meaning in the modern language. The published version of his habilitation thesis, Der deutsche Wortschatz im Sinnbezirk des Verstandes. Die Geschichte eines sprachlichen Feldes (1931), was seminal in semantic field theory, but covers the history of German only to the 13th century; the projected second volume did not appear.

Trier played a major role in a number of important associations and institutes for German studies, including co-founding and leading the German Association for German Studies, co-founding the Leibniz Institute for the German Language, membership of the steering committee and the governing senate of the German Research Foundation and leadership of its Speech and Society subcommittee, and heading the federal government committee on orthography; he also headed the Westphalia Folklore Commission from 1932 to 1945. He declined offers to become a professor at the universities of Heidelberg (1936), Berlin (1938), Göttingen (1946) and Basel (1951).

He joined the Nazi Party in 1933 after they came to power, but was not engaged with Nazi ideology and was declared denazified in 1945 under the post-war British administration. Colleagues and students described him as conservative, but not a Nazi.

== Personal life and death ==
In 1923 he married Margarete Fressel (née Bendixen). They had two sons and a daughter; his stepson was missing in action in the Second World War. He died on 15 September 1970 in Bad Salzuflen and is buried in Schlitz.

== Honours ==
Trier was elected to the Göttingen Academy of Sciences and Humanities comparatively early in his career, in 1939, and to the Goethe-Gesellschaft in Weimar in 1955. He was joint recipient of the 1967 Konrad Duden Prize for German studies.

== Books ==
- Der Heilige Jodocus, 1924
- Der deutsche Wortschatz im Sinnbezirk des Verstandes. Die Geschichte eines sprachlichen Feldes, 1931, repr. 1973
- Lehm: Etymologien zum Fachwerk, 1951
- Holz: Etymologien aus dem Niederwald, 1952
- Venus: Etymologien um das Futterlaub, 1963
- Aufsätze und Vorträge zur Wortfeldtheorie, ed. Anthony van der Lee and Oskar Reichmann, 1973 (posthumous), repr. 2019
- Wege der Etymologie, ed. Hans Schwarz, 1981 (posthumous)
