= Wartenberg, Hesse =

Wartenberg
- Municipality
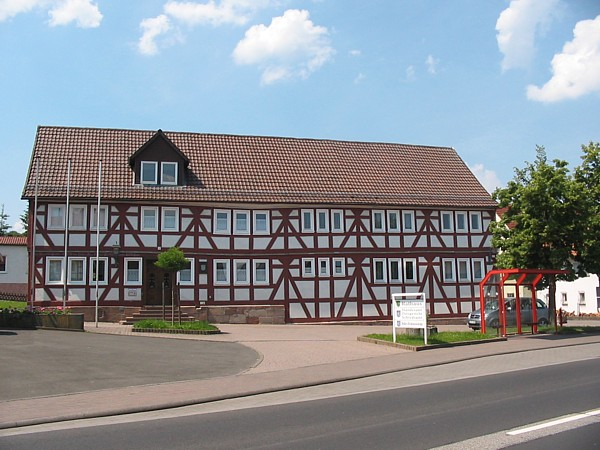
- Town hall

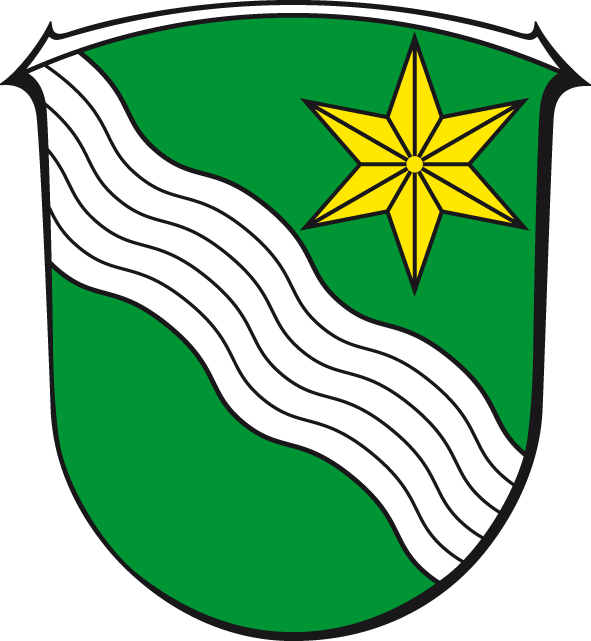
- Coat of arms

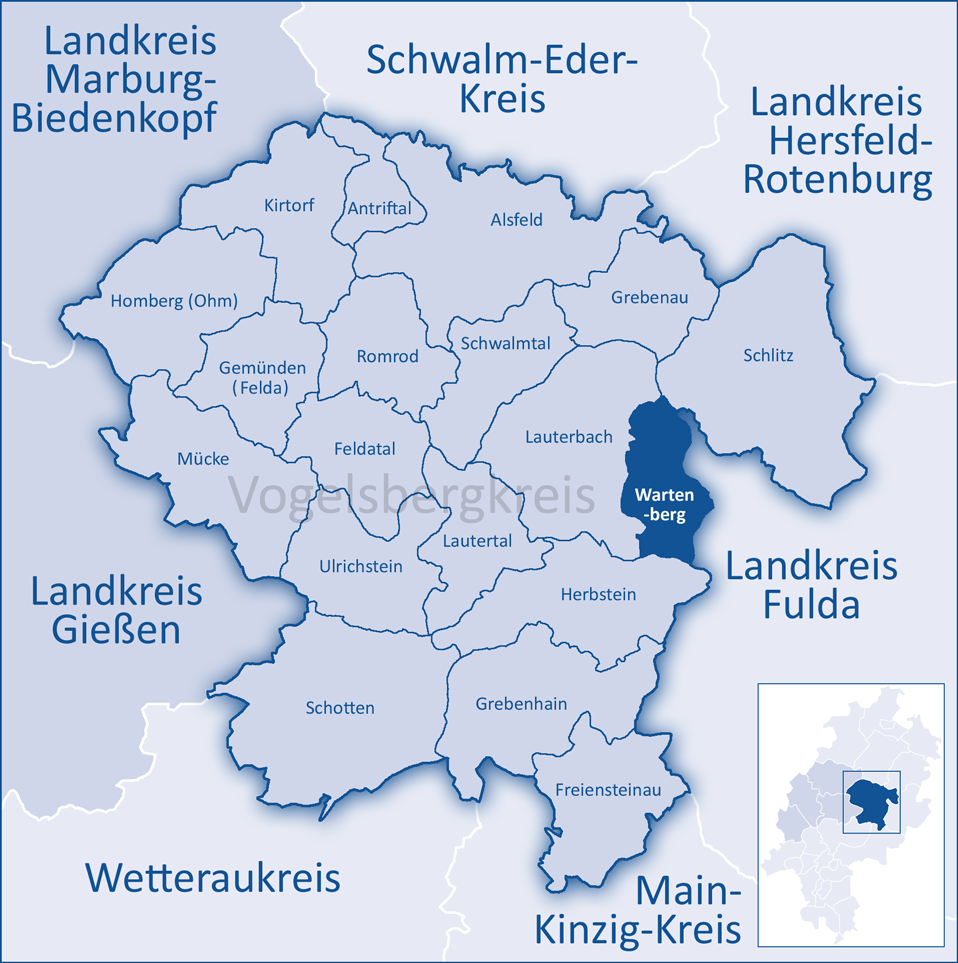
- Location of Wartenberg within Vogelsbergkreis district
- Interactive map of Wartenberg
- Location within Germany Location within Hesse
- Coordinates: 50°37′N 9°26′E
- Country: Germany
- State: Hesse
- Admin. region: Gießen
- District: Vogelsbergkreis
- Subdivisions: 2 Ortsteile

Government
  - Mayor (2020–26): Olaf Dahlmann (SPD)

Area
  - Total: 39.54 km^{2} (15.27 sq mi)
- Elevation: 248–494 m (814–1,621 ft)

Population (2025-12-31)
  - Total: 3,468
  - Density: 87.71/km^{2} (227.2/sq mi)
- Time zone: UTC+01:00 (CET)
  - Summer (DST): UTC+02:00 (CEST)
- Postal codes: 36367
- Dialling codes: 06641/06648
- Vehicle registration: VB
- Website: Gemeinde-Wartenberg.de

Wartenberg (German pronunciation: [ˈvaʁtn̩bɛʁk]) is a municipality in the Vogelsbergkreis in Hesse, Germany.

== Geography ==
=== Location ===
The municipality lies in the eastern Vogelsberg Mountains. Through the municipality flows the river Lauter, which empties into the Altefeld in Bad Salzschlirf, itself a tributary to the Schlitz.

=== Neighbouring municipalities ===
Wartenberg borders in the north on the town of Schlitz, in the east on the municipalities of Bad Salzschlirf and Großenlüder (both in Fulda district), in the south on the town of Herbstein, and in the west on the town of Lauterbach.

=== Constituent municipalities ===
The municipality consists of the centres of Angersbach (2,738 inhabitants) and Landenhausen (1,406 inhabitants).

== History ==
Wartenberg came into being as part of municipal reforms in 1972, when the two aforesaid places were merged into a new municipality.

=== Angersbach ===
Angersbach had its first documentary mention in 812. On 20 September of that year, a church in Schlitz was consecrated in Angersbach by the Archbishop of Mainz and the Abbot Baugulf from Fulda.

=== Landenhausen ===
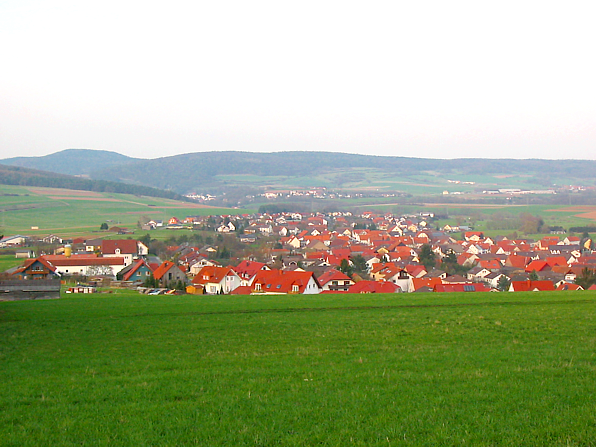
Landenhausen

The form of the village's name holds a clue as to the date of its founding, as it was customary in the time from about 700 to about 800 to name a place after its founder. The name means "Lando's houses or settlement". It seems likely, therefore, that the founder's name must have been "Lando", and that Landenhausen was founded about the 8th century.

The first settlers had a chief, whose job it was to defend the settler generation from danger. It therefore stands to reason that a castle or fortified building must have stood near the village. In the meadowlands below the village, called "Im Burggipfel" or "Am Burggipfel", sandstone foundations may be found, still stuck in the ground. Local inhabitants reported having dug these up in the countryside, and gave accounts of having seen foundations. Some digging unearthed sandstone walls, about 40 cm thick, and it was realized that they once had enclosed a yard of about 40 m^{2}. Furthermore, some sandstone slabs were identified, which had once marked a forecourt, as was a gateway arch, near which were found horseshoes and horses' bones. The entrance to the castle must have faced towards the village. The Riedesel Archive yields the information that the ruins, still recognizable in the 18th century as a Schultheiß's "dilapidated stately home", were cleared away. It seems likely that it was a castle with a moat, the more so as the surrounding area of meadowland is still crossed by several streams, and as some places are boggy moorland. However, documentary evidence for this castle is very scanty.

==== Lords of Landenhausen and of Angersbach ====
The first mention of the noble family of Angersbach goes back to the year 812 when Baron Friedrich von Angersbach donated commodities to the monastery of Fulda. A document from the year 1114 yields the names Heinrich von Landenhausen and Herold von Landenhausen, the latter being the former's son. In the 12th century there was therefore still a noble family called von Landenhausen. Moreover, the same document's naming of Friedrich von Angersbach strongly suggests that the Lords of Landenhausen and of Angersbach were quite close. Given the lack of any further documentary evidence that could shed light on the von Landenhausens' lives, it is assumed that, either through marriage or inheritance, they were merged into the von Angersbachs.

Also to be found in Fulda monastic documents, dated 1114, is a donation by both lordly houses to the Monastery of Fulda. The document mentions both families in connection with this donation. To quote therefrom, it says: "a certain faithful person by the name of Heinrich von Landenhausen", or in the original Latin, "quidam fidelis homo nomine Heinricus de Lantenhusen". The use of the word homo here is a key point, as this was used in these documents generally only for people of high standing or nobility. It is assumed that Heinrich von Landenhausen was descended from the first nobleman in the line, Lando, who is said to be Landenhausen's founder and namesake. It is furthermore assumed that the von Landenhausens' seat was the former castle believed to have once stood in the meadowlands outside town.

== Politics ==
The municipal council is made up of 23 members. As of the last municipal elections held on 26 March 2006, 10 seats are held by the FWGW, a citizens' coalition, 8 are held by the SPD, and 5 are held by the CDU.

The municipal executive consists of 7 members. Three seats are held by the FWGW, 2 by the SPD, 1 by the CDU, and 1 by an independent.

== Culture and sightseeing ==
=== Buildings ===
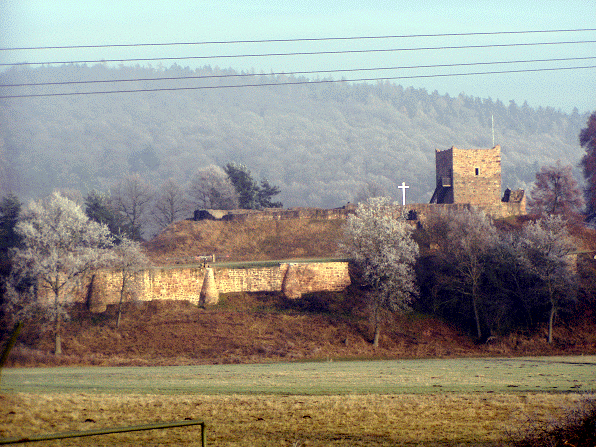
Wartenberg castle ruins (Dec. 2004)

- Wartenberg castle ruins, from Hohenstaufen times (locally also known as "Wartebach")
- Wartenberg-Oval

== Economy and infrastructure ==
=== Transport ===
Both Wartenberg's centres of Landenhausen and Angersbach lie on Federal Highway (Bundesstraße) B 254 running from Alsfeld to Fulda, while Angersbach also has a station on the Vogelsberg Railway (Vogelsbergbahn) between Gießen and Fulda via Alsfeld.

== Literature ==
- Pfr. Wilfried Hilbrig: "Landenhausen in zwölf Jahrhunderten", Hohhausmuseum und Hohhausbibliothek (1981), ISSN 0455-4000
