= Lauterbach, Hesse =

Lauterbach
- Town
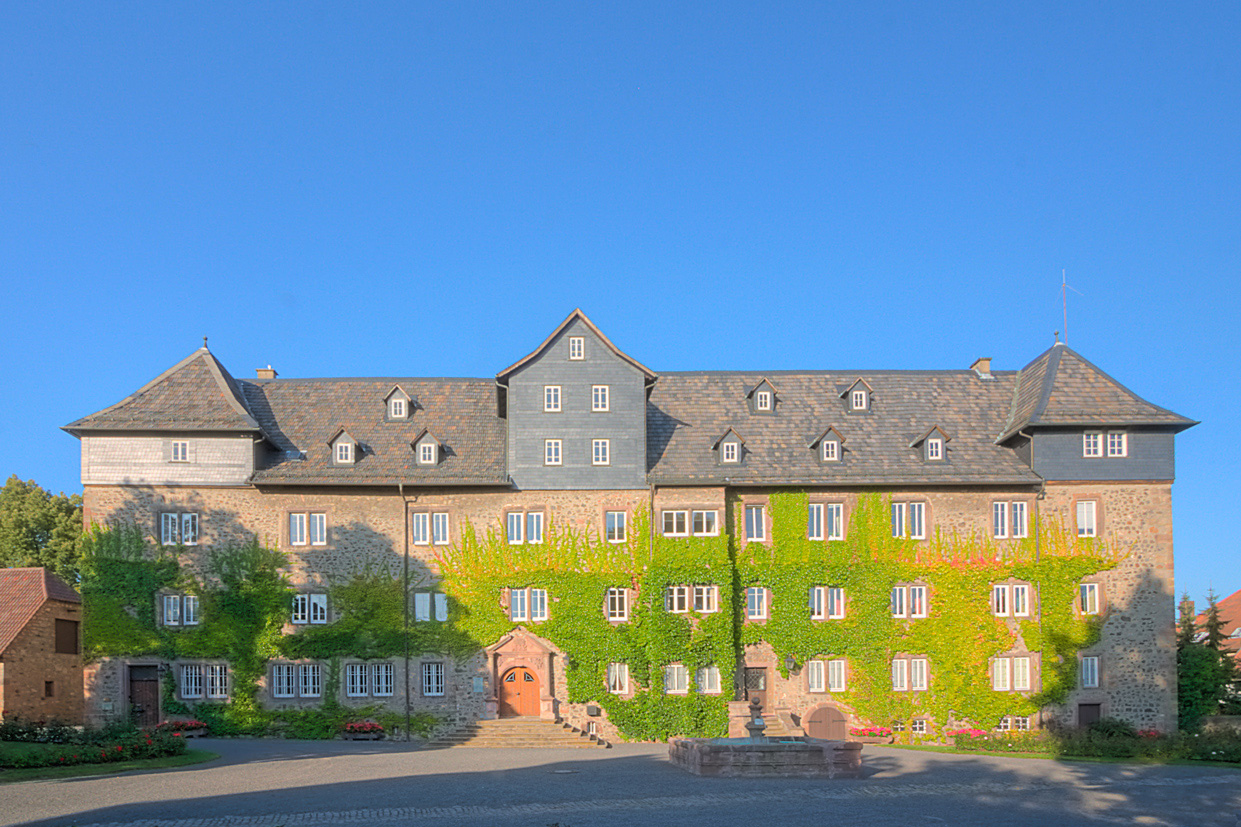
- Lauterbach Chateau

- Flag Coat of arms

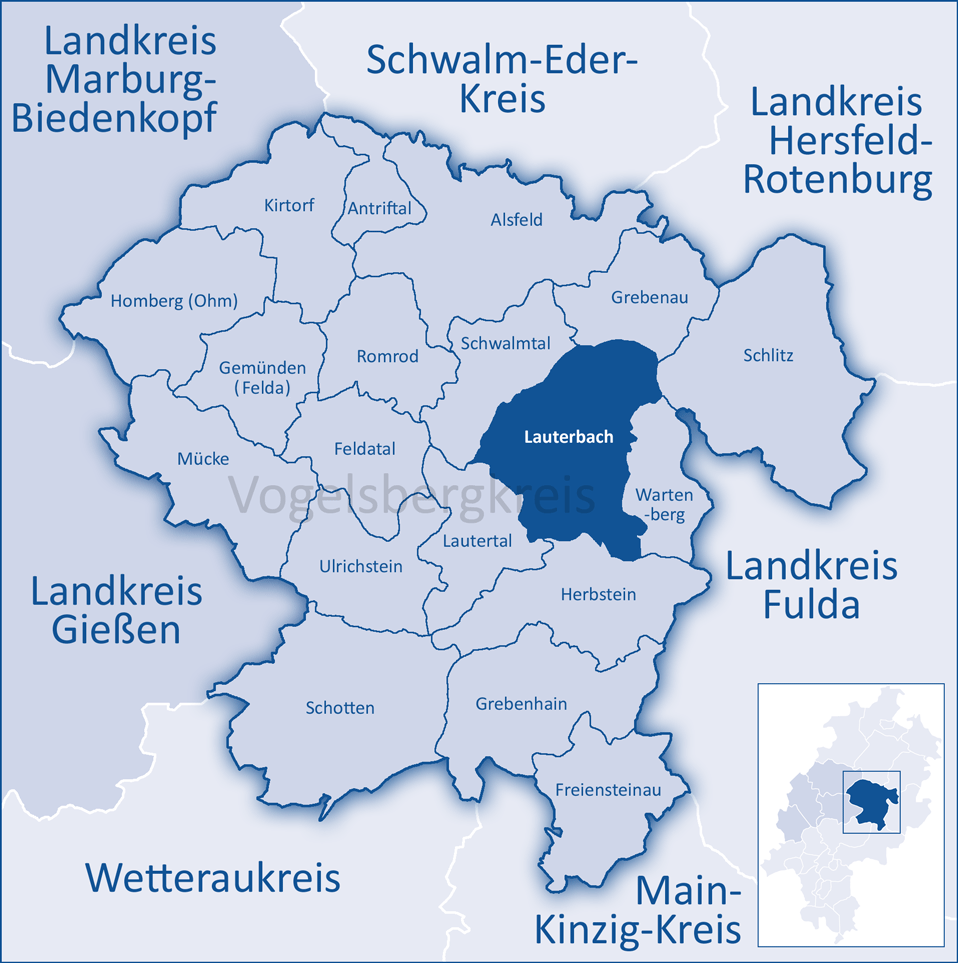
- Location of Lauterbach within Vogelsbergkreis district
- Interactive map of Lauterbach
- Location within Germany Location within Hesse
- Coordinates: 50°38′16″N 9°23′40″E
- Country: Germany
- State: Hesse
- Admin. region: Gießen
- District: Vogelsbergkreis
- Subdivisions: 10 Stadtteile

Government
  - Mayor (2020–26): Rainer-Hans Vollmöller

Area
  - Total: 101.98 km^{2} (39.37 sq mi)
- Elevation: 272–499 m (892–1,637 ft)

Population (2025-12-31)
  - Total: 13,027
  - Density: 127.74/km^{2} (330.85/sq mi)
- Time zone: UTC+01:00 (CET)
  - Summer (DST): UTC+02:00 (CEST)
- Postal codes: 36341
- Dialling codes: 06641, 06638 Wallenrod
- Vehicle registration: VB
- Website: www.lauterbach-hessen.de

Lauterbach (German pronunciation: [ˈlaʊtɐbax]) is the district capital (Kreisstadt) of the Vogelsbergkreis district of the federal state of Hesse in central Germany.

== History ==
Lauterbach was founded between 400 and 800 AD. In 812 the town was mentioned for the first time in a document of the church in Schlitz. In the Middle Ages, Lauterbach belonged to the cloister in Fulda. Then in the 12th century Lauterbach became a fief of the count Ziegenhein from the cloister in Fulda. In 1266, Lauterbach received municipal rights. In the same year, Lauterbach started to build the castle (Burg) and the city wall.

Over the following centuries, ownership rights of Lauterbach changed often and were complicated. Lauterbach became Lutheran following the Reformation. With a pact in 1684, Lauterbach came under the control of the Riedesel zu Eisenbach (Riedesel). Up to 1806, the Riedesels had a small but independent territory. Following the Napoleonic Wars and Congress of Vienna, Lauterbach belonged to the Grand Duchy of Hesse. In 1852, Lauterbach became the seat of the new founded district (Kreis) of Lauterbach. In 1972, local governments were re-organized, and the new, larger district Vogelsberg was founded of which Lauterbach remains the seat of government.

== Villages that belong to Lauterbach ==
In 1972, several villages were incorporated into the town of Lauterbach: Allmenrod, Frischborn, Heblos, Maar, Reuters, Rimlos, Rudlos, Sickendorf, Wallenrod and Wernges.

== Culture ==
In 1983, the town hosted the 23rd Hessentag state festival.

== Economy ==
Lauterbacher beer is the oldest beer in Hesse. The brand has existed since 1527.

== Features ==
The Ankerturm is the only remaining tower of the city wall. It was used to be an observation tower. Temporarily it was also used as a prison.

The Hainigturm is a tower between Lauterbach and Angersbach. This tourist attraction was built in 1907.

The Schrittsteine (stepping stones) were used as a shortcut to get to the local water fountain.

== Notable people ==
- Friedrich Adolf Riedesel (1738–1800), military leader
- John Rock (1836–1904), German-American horticulturalist and nurseryman
- Fritz Selbmann (1899–1975), politician and writer
- Peter Grünberg (1939–2018), physicist, Nobel Prize in Physics laureate; spent his childhood and youth in Lauterbach

== Gallery ==
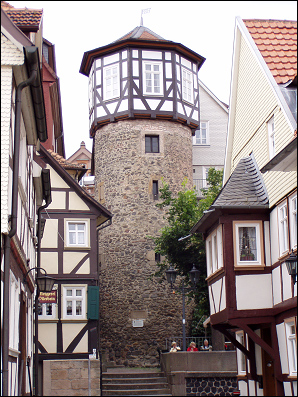
The Ankerturm tower

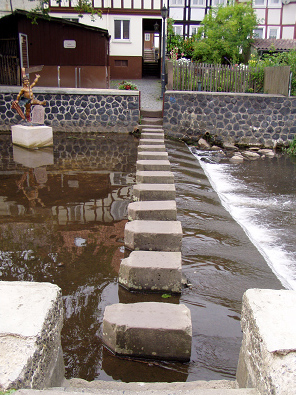
Stepping stones

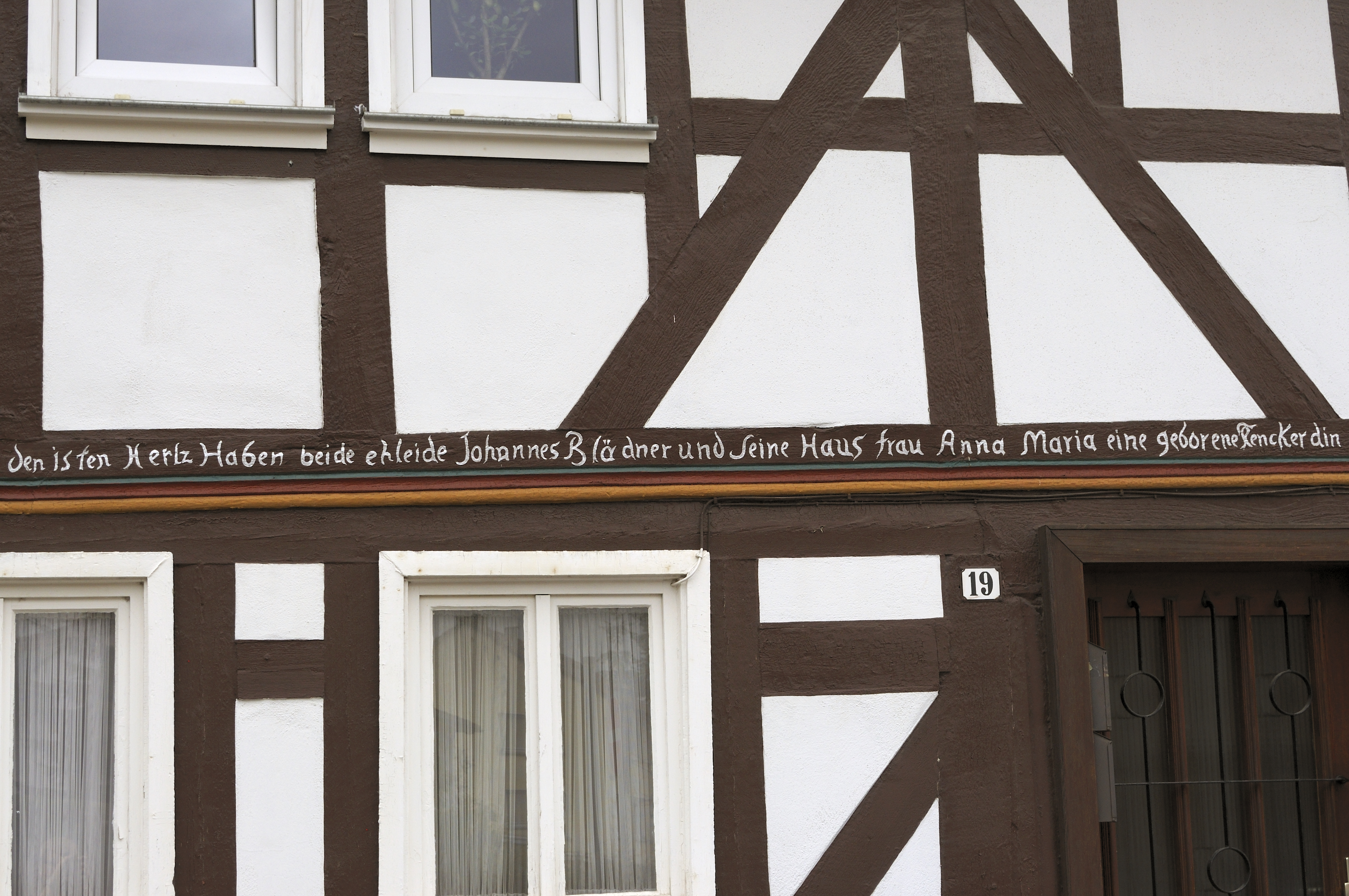
Cultural heritage monument in Lauterbach
