= Lee Upton =

Lee Upton (born June 2, 1953, St. Johns, Michigan) is an American poet, fiction writer, and literary critic. She earned a BA in journalism at Michigan State University, a master of fine arts (MFA) at the University of Massachusetts Amherst's Program for Poets & Writers, and a PhD in English literature at the State University of New York at Binghamton.

== Life ==
She is the author of several books of poetry, fiction, and literary criticism, including The Muse of Abandonment (1998, Bucknell University Press), Civilian Histories (2000, University of Georgia Press), Undid in the Land of Undone (2007, New Issues/Western Michigan University Press), and The Guide to the Flying Island (2009, Miami University Press). She is a former professor of English and writer in residence at Lafayette College in Easton, Pennsylvania. In 1990, Upton collaborated with artist Ed Kerns and fellow poet Charles Molesworth on an exhibition of poetry and images at the Williams Center in Easton, Pennsylvania.

Her work has appeared in The New Yorker, The Atlantic, the New Republic, American Poetry Review, Harvard Review, and DoubleTake.

== Awards ==
- 2008 Miami University Press Novella Prize
- Lyric Poetry Award
- Writer Magazine/Emily Dickinson Award at the group's 95th annual awards ceremony April 28, 2005 at The New School in New York City.
- 1988 National Poetry Series

== Bibliography ==
=== Poetry collections ===
- The Day Every Day Is. Ardmore, PA: Saturnalia Books, 2023. Recipient of the Saturnalia Books Poetry Prize.
- Bottle the Bottles the Bottles the Bottles. Cleveland: Cleveland State University Poetry Center, 2015. Winner of the Open Book Award.
- Undid in the Land of Undone. Kalamazoo: New Issues Press, 2007. ISBN 978-1-930974-72-2
- Civilian Histories. Athens: University of Georgia Press, 2000. ISBN 978-0-8203-2185-1
- Approximate Darling. Athens: University of Georgia Press, 1996. ISBN 978-0-8203-1811-0
- On Stage Tonight. Troll Communications Llc. 1991. ISBN 978-0-89375-791-5.
- No Mercy. New York: Atlantic Monthly Press, 1989. Winner of the National Poetry Series. ISBN 978-0-87113-339-7 Winner of the 1988 National Poetry Series.
- The Invention of Kindness. Tuscaloosa: University of Alabama Press, 1984. ISBN 978-0-8173-0197-2
- Small Locks. Fallen Angel Press. 1979. ISBN 0-931598-08-7.

=== Novels ===
- Tabitha, Get Up. Sagging Meniscus. May 2024. ISBN 978-1-952386-89-3.

=== Novellas ===
- The Guide to the Flying Island. Miami University Press. 2009. ISBN 978-1-60743-571-6. Winner of the Miami University Novella Award

=== Short fiction collections ===
- Visitations: Stories. Yellow Shoe Fiction Series. Baton Rouge: Louisiana State University Press, 2017. Recipient of Kirkus Star; listed in “Best of the Indies 2017” and “Best Indie Books for December” by Kirkus; American Book Fest Best Book Awards finalist; “Distinguished Stories of 2017” by Best American Short Stories 2018; Pushcart Prize 2018 notable story
- The Tao of Humiliation. BOA Editions. 2014. ISBN 978-1-938160-32-5. Winner of the BOA Short Fiction Award; listed in “Best Books of 2014” by Kirkus; Paterson Prize in Fiction finalist

=== Nonfiction ===
- Swallowing the Sea: On Writing & Ambition, Boredom, Purity & Secrecy. Tupelo Press. 2012. ISBN 978-1-936797-13-4. Winner of ForeWord Reviews Book of the Year Award
- Defensive Measures: The Poetry Of Niedecker, Bishop, Gluck, And Carson. Bucknell University Press. 2005. ISBN 978-0-8387-5607-2.
- The Muse of Abandonment. Bucknell University Press. 1998. ISBN 978-0-8387-5396-5.
- Obsession and release: rereading the poetry of Louise Bogan. Bucknell University Press. 1996. ISBN 978-0-8387-5321-7.
- Jean Garrigue: A Poetics of Plenitude. Fairleigh Dickinson University Press. 1991. ISBN 978-0-8386-3397-7.

=== Libretto ===
- The Masque of Edgar Allan Poe, composer Kirk O’Riordan, librettist Lee Upton. Performed by University of Delaware Opera Theatre at University of Delaware on November 11, 2016 and University of Delaware Opera Theater at Williams Center for the Arts at Lafayette College on November 13, 2016.

=== Collaborative Art Books ===
- Tying & Untying. Lee Upton and Jim Toia. Clinton, NJ: Lucia Press, 2012.
- The Maid at the Pond. Curlee Holton and Lee Upton. Experimental Printmaking Institute, 2006.
- Omniscient Love. Curlee Holton and Lee Upton. Experimental Printmaking Institute, 2005.

=== Selected anthologies ===
- Kevin Young; David Lehman, eds. (2011). The Best American Poetry 2011. Simon and Schuster. ISBN 978-1-4391-8150-8.
- Charles Wright; David Lehman, eds. (2008). The Best American Poetry 2008. Simon and Schuster. ISBN 978-0-7432-9975-6.
- David Walker, ed. (2006). American Alphabets: 25 Contemporary Poets. Oberlin College Press. ISBN 978-0-932440-28-0.
- Susan Burmeister-Brown, ed. (2001). Glimmer Train Stories, #36. Glimmer Train Press. ISBN 978-1-880966-36-5.
