= Karl Stirner =

American sculptor (1923–2016)

- Born: November 14, 1923; Bad Wildbad, Weimar Germany
- Died: February 18, 2016 (aged 92); Easton, Pennsylvania, US
- Known for: Sculpture; Metalwork
- Notable work: Red Arch (2011)
- Spouses: Barbara Lund (m. 1955; died 1957) Heather Harland (m. 1962) Gay Elwell (m. 2010; died 2012)
- Children: 3

Karl Stirner (November 14, 1923 – February 18, 2016) was a German-born American sculptor known internationally for his metalwork. His work has been shown at the Museum of Modern Art in New York, the Pennsylvania Academy of Fine Arts, the Philadelphia Museum of Art, the Corcoran Gallery of Art, the La Jolla Museum of Contemporary Art, the James A. Michener Art Museum, the Grounds for Sculpture in Hamilton, New Jersey, the Delaware Art Museum, and other locations. Stirner also participated in exhibitions in Taiwan, Hungary, and Italy.

Stirner was born in Bad Wildbad, Weimar Germany, and his family immigrated to Philadelphia, Pennsylvania. He started his career in Philadelphia, opening several shops and working as an art professor at the Moore College of Art, Swarthmore College, Temple University, and the Tyler School of Art.

In 1983, Stirner moved to Easton, Pennsylvania. Stirner spent most of his later life revitalizing the arts scene in Easton and the city of Easton honored him by creating the "Karl Stirner Arts Trail."

== Early life and education ==
Stirner was born in Bad Wildbad, Germany in 1923 during the Weimar Republic to Pauline (née Gunn) and Karl Stirner. He was the youngest of five children. His family immigrated to the United States in 1927, where they settled in Philadelphia, Pennsylvania.

As a child, Stirner considered himself an enthusiastic naturalist:

As a child I had—and still have—a great love of nature. Every frog, bird, insect—any living creature—was of extraordinary interest. Minerals, crystals of quartz and garnet, shells called me. I loved it all, and engaged in a constant quest for every facet of the natural world.

From sixth to eighth grades, between 1934 and 1936, Stirner attended Dobbins Vocational School. In 1941, Stirner enrolled in the Drexel Institute of Art in Philadelphia to study mechanical engineering. However, Stirner dropped out after only six months, not lasting a full year at this school. Stirner then worked as an industrial designer before entering the military. Stirner served in the Army, where he was deployed to the Philippines and New Guinea from 1943 to 1946 during World War II.

== Career ==
Stirner's interest in metalworking stemmed from his father, who was a fine jeweler. After returning from the military, Stirner opened an experimental machine shop in the present-day Germantown section of Philadelphia in 1946, where he designed precision mechanical devices. Some of his prototypes included a capsule loading machine for pharmacists and a fishing reel. In 1948, Stirner opened a metal arts studio that he ran until 1957. Stirner created metal furniture and ecclesiastical items in this studio. In 1956, Stirner opened his own metal-working shop, Karl Stirner Ornamental Ironworks, in the Germantown section of Philadelphia. He sold iron furniture and sculptures at this shop, as well as led lessons on welding and other sculptural processes. Students from the Tyler School of Art visited the shop to learn welding and other skills.

Stirner continued teaching at the Moore College of Art and Design in Philadelphia, where he taught classes in 1955, despite having little formal education and no real artistic background. He then became the director of the Metal Sculpture Department at the Tyler School of Art in 1957 and later taught courses there, including basic design and art history at Temple University, Moore College of Art and Design, and Swarthmore College.

Between 1957 and 1975, Stirner's work was shown at the Delaware Museum of Art (1959), the Philadelphia Museum of Art (1960 and 1963), the Philadelphia Print Club (1963), the Museum of Modern Art (1963), the Pennsylvania Academy of the Fine Arts (1963 and 1975), the Corcoran Gallery of Art (1975), the Fort Worth Museum of Art (1975), the La Jolla Museum of Contemporary Art (1975), and the Pratt Graphic Art Center (1975). Stirner was also involved in architectural design and construction. Between 1969 and 1971, Stirner built houses in Bucks County, Pennsylvania. He also designed and built Hartford Square, a residential zone in West Chester, Pennsylvania that was a former industrial zone.

In 1982, Stirner moved to Brooklyn, New York City, where he opened the Stirner-Unangst Gallery. In 1983, Stirner relocated to Easton, Pennsylvania in 1983, where he spent the rest of his life. Stirner moved into a former warehouse and sewing factory at 230 Ferry Street in Easton, and went on to open the Karl Stirner Gallery, art and dance studios, and commercial spaces. His purchase of an old industrial building on Ferry Street marked the beginning of the "Easton Experiment" in 1982, which then turned into The Easton Arts Building. Over the next 17 years, Stirner dedicated his time to revitalizing the arts scene in Easton.

Between 1985 and 2013, Stirner's work was shown in Cedar Crest College (1985), the University of Connecticut Health Center (1987), Fairleigh Dickinson University (1900), The Gallery at the State Theater Center for the Arts in Easton, Pennsylvania (1993), the Grounds for Sculpture show in Hamilton Township, New Jersey (1995), Everhart Museum in Scranton, Pennsylvania (1999), the Allentown Art Museum (2000 and 2006), James A. Michener Art Museum (2001 and 2013), First International Steel and Iron Sculpture Festival in Kaohsiung (2002), the Janos Pannonius Museum in Pécs, Hungary (2002), the Pratt Institute Sculpture Park (2004), Tufts University Art Gallery (2005), the American Art Festival in Genoa, Italy (2008), and the Payne Gallery at Moravian College (2013).

=== Personal life ===
Stirner had three marriages throughout his lifetime. He married his first wife, Barbara Lund (1936-1957), in 1955 and they were together until she took her own life at 21 years old. Stirner was deeply affected by her death and created "Barbara in a Box," a steel-framed black-and-white portrait from their wedding, as a way to honor her memory.

He then married Heather Harland in 1962 and had three children: Heather (born 1962), Noelle (born 1967), and Jonas (born 1970). His son, Jonas Stirner, became a sculptor. In 2010, Karl Stirner married Gay Elwell (1958-2012). She died only two years later at the age of 54.

Karl Stirner also enjoyed traveling to various places around the world to study and display his art. He traveled to Mexico between 1969 and 1971 to study pre-Columbian art. He also spent time from 1971 until his death traveling to Guatemala, Mexico, Italy, France, England, and Turkey.

== Death ==
On February 18, 2016, Stirner died at his home in Easton, Pennsylvania, at age 92.

== Art ==
=== Metalwork ===
Stirner was a self-taught artist whose main focus was metalwork. He produced metal sculptures and engravings with metal, typically iron and steel, from Bethlehem Steel, shipwrecks, and junkyards. In his work, Stirner would bend, shape, and weld the metal into various forms in order to test the various ways he could manipulate it for his art. Stirner was praised for his ability to transform metal and give it new life.

Karl Stirner, when sculpting, fuses natural materials with man-made ones. He contracts smooth surfaces with rough and pitted ones to form organic shapes. Karl Stirner's career with steel sculpture began in 1928, after Catalan sculptor and painter, Julio González taught him welding.

Stirner's artistic focus was exploring how to put his knowledge, experience, and dreams into a sculpture. While the piece of metal may vaguely resemble a bucket, step ladder, or stick figure, the piece typically represents one of Stirner's dreams. Most of the pieces of Stirner's metalwork were untitled.

=== Style ===
Much of Karl Stirner's work is considered to embody an abstract style. Stirner used his metalwork and steel sculptures to translate and express many of his inner feelings and thoughts. Stirner's sculptures typically fall into two subcategories of the abstract: expressionism and constructivist. His expressionist sculptures have been described as "anxiety-ridden" while his constructivist sculptures have been described as "depressive". This is because they appear to elicit depressive emotions and feelings of internal conflict. The "dream-like" aspect of his work is supposedly inspired by Stirner's unconscious state. A work of his that is most notable for being dream-like is Head of a Woman and Woman in the Garden.

Stirner's work is intentionally abstract (refined and gritty; thick and thin; smooth and rough). It is variously humorous, while tragic as well as simple, yet complex. Stirner's work is loyal to the medium itself, to the steel of which it is composed; it exhibits a familiarity and a knowledge of that medium. It is almost an identity, a kinship, with the metal.

Stirner is subjective and expressionist, but he is not mannered. His work is the work of the spirit finding itself—not in clay—but in steel.

=== Exhibitions and awards ===
- 1859: Solo show at the Delaware Museum of Art.
- 1956: Group show held in The Print Club, in Philadelphia, Pennsylvania. Stirner was awarded the Lessing J. Resenwald Prize for his woodcut, The Forces of Time.
- 1959: Solo show in the Delaware Museum of Art in Wilmington, Delaware.
- 1963:
  - Solo show of 52 engravings at the Philadelphia Print Club.
  - Group show held at the Philadelphia Museum of Art, in Philadelphia, Pennsylvania.
- 2015: Stirner received an Honorary Degree from Lafayette College.

Stirner and his work greatly influenced Steve Tobin, causing Tobin to organize exhibitions at the Payne Gallery of Moravian College and the James A. Michener Art Museum to present Stirner's life work. Stirner and Tobin met each other in 1990 after Tobin heard Stirner on National Public Radio (NPR) promoting Easton, Pennsylvania's up-and-coming art scene.

== Karl Stirner Arts Trail ==
Stirner is memorialized in Easton, Pennsylvania by the Karl Stirner Arts Trail (formerly the Bushkill Trail) that opened along the Bushkill Creek in 2011. The trail extends from the Delaware River, through historic downtown Easton, and along the banks of the Bushkill Creek. The 2.5-mile-long trail connects Third Street with the Lehigh Valley Silk Mills redevelopment project along 13th Street. The arts trail contains works by Karl Stirner and other local and international artists, including Willie Cole, David Kimball Anderson, and Patricia Meyerowitz. It has been stated that the philosophy of the Arts Trail includes environmental sustainability as well as public stewardship of an urban "green infrastructure." Currently, Jim Toia, an artist and Lafayette College professor, is lead administrator of the trail.

The ribbon cutting ceremony was held on November 3, 2011.

The trail now includes the "Young Masters Wall" which exhibits the paintings of area youth on a rotating basis.

=== Artwork ===
The trail has fifteen sculptures that were chosen by the Board of Governance of the Karl Stirner Arts Trail, a nonprofit organization that includes members of Lafayette College, art experts, and city officials. The first sculpture on the trail is Stirner's red steel arch. The arch represents not only Stirner's style, but also his contribution to the art scene of Easton.

The other seven sculptures include three pieces of Willie Cole's Grace Gate, Jack & Jill and The Jungle; Loren Madsen's Nobori; David Kimball Andersen's Nitrogen & Hydrogen; Patricia Weyerowiz's Easton Ellipse; Paul Deery's Water Way. Also, at the end of the trail there is an ongoing community project between the youth of Easton schools and organizations called "The Young Master's Wall". This wall features paintings directly on a rock wall.

In 2017, the city added sculptures by Steve Tobin.

==== Possible Realities Two ====
Possible Realities Two is the result of a call for environmentally-focused entries in 2015. Each year over twenty-five local artists and public vote for the ideas that they consider the best. The artwork that receives the most votes will become a "reality". The winning artist will receive a stipend of 4,000 dollars to produce and install their work.

Water Way by Paul Deery was chosen in 2015 as the first piece of Possible Realities Two artwork. It is a stone-line trail that follows the Bushkill Creek. The artist intended for people to feel the flow of water while they walk along the path. The installation of Water Way was executed from July 11 to August 15, 2015.
