= Ed Kerns =

American painter (1945–2025)

Ed Kerns (February 22, 1945 – October 20, 2025) was an American abstract artist and educator. Kerns studied with the noted Abstract-Expressionist painter Grace Hartigan and through the elder artist came to know and work with many artists of that generation including, Phillip Guston, Willem de Kooning, James Brooks, Ernest Briggs, Richard Diebenkorn, and Sam Francis.

== Early life ==
Born in 1945 in Richmond, Virginia, Kerns started painting at a young age. He attended the Richmond Professional Institute, receiving his BFA in 1967. He went on to the Maryland Institute, where he studied with painter Grace Hartigan. Here, Kerns received the Hoffberger Fellowship and graduated with an MFA in 1969.

== Painting career ==
Kerns first gained exposure in 1972, when he was commissioned by art collector Larry Aldrich to paint 100 paintings over the course of the year as gifts. That same year, Kerns had his first solo art show at the AM Sachs Gallery in New York. Over the course of the 1970s and 80s, Kerns formed a close partnership with the Rosa Esman Gallery and exhibited ten solo shows there.

Of his work in the late 1970s and early 80s, gallery coordinator Judith Stein says, "He works slowly, creating no more than ten large paintings a year. His media are acrylic, sand, and thread, the last used to stitch together sections of canvas. Often plywood or Upson board is used as support."

== Teaching ==
Kerns began teaching in 1970, as an art teacher at the Bentley School in New York City. In 1972, he became head of the Art Department at the Baldwin School, and 1974, he headed the Art Department of Friends Seminary. In 1980, he left Friends Academy and moved to Easton, Pennsylvania, where he became the Head of Lafayette College's Art Department. In 1988, he was selected to serve as the first Eugene H. Clapp II Professor of the Humanities at Lafayette College.

== Collaborations ==
In 1989, Kerns collaborated with poet Lee Upton on a series of paintings. The series culminated in a show, A Collaboration of Poetry and Images, which was exhibited throughout Pennsylvania. Kerns has also collaborated with Rev. Ted Loder, illustrating four books written by the reverend.

In 2007, Kerns collaborated with artist Elizabeth Chapman on "Word, City, Mind: A Universal Resonance," an exhibit that used "paint, text, collage, and image, the exhibit focuses on the resonance between neurological, cosmic, and man-made forms".

== Death ==
Ed Kerns died on October 20, 2025, at the age of 80.

== Exhibitions ==
=== Solo exhibitions ===
- 2008 "Word, City, Mind: A Universal Resonance," Skillman Library, Lafayette College, Easton, Pennsylvania
- 2007 "Word, City, Mind: A Universal Resonance," Muhlenberg College, Allentown, Pennsylvania
- 2005 "Ed Kerns, New Paintings," Banana Factory, Bethlehem, Pennsylvania
- 2003 "Ed Kerns, Digital Images," Ahlum Gallery, Easton, Pennsylvania
- 1997 "Ed Kerns, New Paintings," M-13 Gallery, New York City
- 1995 "Ed Kerns, Small Works: Project Room," M-13 Gallery, New York, New York
- 1994 "Ed Kerns, New Paintings," M-13 Gallery, New York, New York
- 1989 "Ed Kerns," William Paterson College, Ben Shahn Galleries, Wayne, New Jersey
- 1987 "Ed Kerns," Rosa Esman Gallery, New York, New York
- 1986 "Ed Kerns," Cedar Crest College, Allentown, Pennsylvania
- 1984 "Ed Kerns, Drawings," Painted Bride Art Center, Philadelphia, Pennsylvania
- 1983 "Ed Kerns, Paintings," Rosa Esman Gallery, New York, New York
- 1982 "Ed Kerns, Recent Paintings," Morris Gallery, The Pennsylvania Academy of the Fine Arts, Philadelphia, Pennsylvania
- 1981 "Ed Kerns, Recent Paintings," Rosa Esman Gallery, New York, New York
- 1980 "Ed Kerns, Paintings," Rosa Esman Gallery, New York, New York
- "Ed Kerns, Paintings," VanWickle Gallery, Lafayette College, Easton, Pennsylvania
- 1979 "Ed Kerns," Rosa Esman Gallery, New York, New York
- 1978 "Ed Kerns, New Paintings," Rosa Esman Gallery, New York, New York
- 1977 "Ed Kerns, Paintings," Rosa Esman Gallery, New York, New York
- "Ed Kerns, New York," Suzette Schochet Gallery, Newport, Rhode Island
- 1976 "Ed Kerns, Paintings," Rosa Esman Gallery, New York, New York
- 1975 "Ed Kerns," Rosa Esman Gallery, New York, New York
- 1974 "Ed Kerns, Paintings," Rosa Esman gallery, New York, New York
- "Ed Kerns," A.M. Sachs Gallery, New York, New York
- 1972 "Ed Kerns," A.M. Sachs Gallery, New York, New York

=== Collaborations ===
- 2003 "Evolution"- Ed Kerns and Tom DiGiovanni, Main Stage Theatre of Williams Performing Arts Center, Lafayette College, Easton, Pennsylvania
- 1991 "A Collaboration of Poetry and Images," Ed Kerns and Lee Upton, University Science Center, Philadelphia, Pennsylvania
- 1990 "A Collaboration of Poetry and Images," Ed Kerns and Lee Upton, Villanova University, Villanova, Pennsylvania
- "A Collaboration of Poetry and Images," Ed Kerns and Lee Upton, Lafayette College Art Gallery, Easton, Pennsylvania; Open Space Art Gallery, Allentown, Pennsylvania

=== Group exhibitions ===
- 2007 "Hot Topic: Meditations on Global Warming," The Arts Center Gallery at Germantown Academy, Fort Washington, Pennsylvania
- "Neuroscience and the Artistic Process," Muhlenberg College Center for the Arts, Allentown, Pennsylvania
- 2006 "Hypertexturalities:Architectures and Morphologies," Florence Lynch Gallery, New York, New York curated by Lee Klein
- "The Mind of Nature: Structures and Processes," Taipei Culture Foundation, Taipei, Taiwan
- "Ed Kerns, Lew Minter, Jim Toia Visiting American Artists," Taipei Artists Village, Taipei, Taiwan
- 2004 "Synthesis: Experiments in Collaboration" Axel Raben Gallery, New York, New York
- 2003 "Synthesis: Experiments in Collaboration," Lafayette College, Williams Visual Arts Building, Grossman Gallery, Easton, Pennsylvania
- "Thinking in Line: A Survey of Contemporary Drawing," University Gallery, University of Florida, Gainesville, Florida
- "Hyper Texture: Fabian Marcaccio, David Reed, Pia Fries, Ed Kerns, and Roy Lerner," The Florence Lynch Gallery, New York, New York curated by Lee Klein
- "Michael Goldberg, Grace Hartigan, Mary Frank, and Ed Kerns," Seraphin Gallery, Philadelphia, Pennsylvania
- 2002 "Gallery Group Exhibit: Ed Kerns, Phoebe Adams, Grace Hartigan, Leon Golub, and George Herms," Seraphin Gallery, Philadelphia, Pennsylvania
- "Post-Systemic Art," Hunterdon Museum of Art, Clinton, New Jersey
- 2001 "Lafayette College Faculty Exhibit," Easton, Pennsylvania
- 2000 "Howard Scott Gallery, Artist" New York, New York
- 1999 "Howard Scott Gallery", New York, New York
- 1998 "Faculty Plus," State Theatre Gallery, Easton, Pennsylvania
- Ruffino de Tamayo Print Museum, Mexico
- 1997 "Gallery Artists," M-13 Gallery, New York, New York
- 1996 "White," An exhibition of white paintings, M-13 Gallery, New York, New York
- 1993 "Collaboration, Kerns, Kessler, Greenberg, Boothe and Hassay," Lafayette College, Easton, Pennsylvania
- 1992 "Ed Kerns, Small Works," Open Space Gallery, Allentown, Pennsylvania
- "Friends Seminary Benefit," with Stella, Sultan, and others, New York, New York
- 1991 New Arts Program Group Exhibit, Kutztown University, Kutztown, Pennsylvania
- "Mayfair," Muhlenberg College, Center for the Arts, Allentown, Pennsylvania
- 1989 "Summer Exhibit," Villanova University Art Gallery, Villanova University, Villanova, Pennsylvania
- 1988 "Summer Group," Rosa Esman Gallery, New York, New York
- 1987 "Art Against Aids Exhibition," Rosa Esman Gallery, New York, New York
- Group Exhibition, Lehigh University, Wilson Gallery, Bethlehem, Pennsylvania
- 1986 Group Exhibition, Rosa Esman Gallery, New York, New York
- 1985 "July Group Exhibition," Rosa Esman Gallery, New York, New York
- "Fall Exhibition," Rosa Esman Gallery, New York, New York
- "Summer Exhibition," Rosa Esman Gallery, New York, New York
- 1984 "Gallery Group," Rosa Esman Gallery, New York, New York
- "Faculty Exhibition," Lafayette College, Easton, Pennsylvania
- "New Abstract Painting," Joint Exhibition, Lafayette and Muhlenberg Colleges, Easton and Allentown, Pennsylvania
- "Group Exhibition," Karl Sterner Gallery, Easton, Pennsylvania
- 1983 "Gallery Artists," Rosa Esman Gallery, New York, New York
- "Visiting Artists Exhibition," Maryland Institute, College of Art, Baltimore, Maryland
- 1982 "Contemporary American Art," The Commodities Corporation, Princeton, New Jersey
- "Tenth Anniversary Exhibition of Gallery Artists, The Russian Revolution to Post Modern," Rosa Esman Gallery, New York, New York
- "Pennsylvania Artists," Freedman Gallery, Albright College, Reading, Pennsylvania
- "Chicago, Art Expo," Rosa Esman Pavilion, Chicago, Illinois
- "American Abstract Painting of the 80's," Randolph Macon College, Lynchburg, Virginia
- 1981 "Visiting New York Artists," Maryland Institute, College of Art, Baltimore, Maryland
- "Gallery Artists," Rosa Esman Gallery, New York, New York
- "Art in Pursuit of a Smile," Center for the Arts, Muhlenberg College, Allentown, Pennsylvania
- "Artists Make Architecture," Rosa Esman Gallery, New York, New York
- 1980 "American Painting," Mueso Civico e Gallerie D'arte Moderna, Udine, Italy
- "Gallery Artists," Rosa Esman Gallery, New York, New York
- 1979 "Structure and Painting," Rosa Esman Gallery, New York, New York
- "Summer Summary," Rosa Esman Gallery, New York, New York
- "Collage," Goddard Riverside Gallery, New York, New York
- 1978 "Graffiti," San Francisco Museum of Contemporary Art, San Francisco, California
- 1977 "Small Master Works," Rosa Esman Gallery, New York, New York
- "Skin," Dayton Art Institute, Dayton, Ohio
- "American Artists," Basel Art Fair, Basel, Switzerland
- "Art of the 60's and 70's," Center for the Arts, Muhlenberg College, Allentown, Pennsylvania
- "Summer Show," Rosa Esman Gallery, New York, New York
- 1976 "The Material Dominant," Penn State University Museum of Art, University Park, Pennsylvania
- "American Artists," F.A.I.C., Grand Palis, Paris, France
- "Large Works," Rosa Esman Gallery, New York, New York
- "Project Rebuild," Grey Art Gallery, New York University, New York, New York
- "Contemporary American Painting," Lehigh University, Bethlehem, Pennsylvania
- "Works on Paper," Image Gallery, Stockbridge, Massachusetts
- "Gallery Group," Rosa Esman Gallery, New York, New York
- "Group Show," Albright Knox Museum, Buffalo, New York
- "Small Master Works," Rosa Esman Gallery, New York, New York
- "Art on Paper," Weatherspoon Gallery, Raleigh, North Carolina
- 1975 "New York Artists," Etienne De Causans, Tableaux Contemporains, Paris, France
- "Gallery Artists," Rosa Esman Gallery, New York, New York
- 1974 "Group Show," Brooklyn Museum, Brooklyn, New York
- 1973 "Image of Movement," Stamford Museum, Stamford, Connecticut
- "Gallery Group," A.M. Sachs Gallery, New York, New York
- "Reflection," Larry Aldrich Museum, Ridgefield, Connecticut
- 1972 "New York Artists," Jacobs Ladder Gallery, Washington, D.C.
- "Works on Paper," Herter Hall Art Gallery, University of Massachusetts, Amherst, Massachusetts
- 1971 Larry Aldrich Associates, New York, New York
- "Today," Maryland Institute, College of Art, Baltimore, Maryland
- "New Talent," A.M. Sachs Gallery, New York, New York
- "The Baltimore Museum of Art, New Talent," Baltimore Museum of Art, Baltimore, Maryland
