= Statue of the Marquis de Lafayette (Lafayette College) =

Statue in Easton, Pennsylvania, US

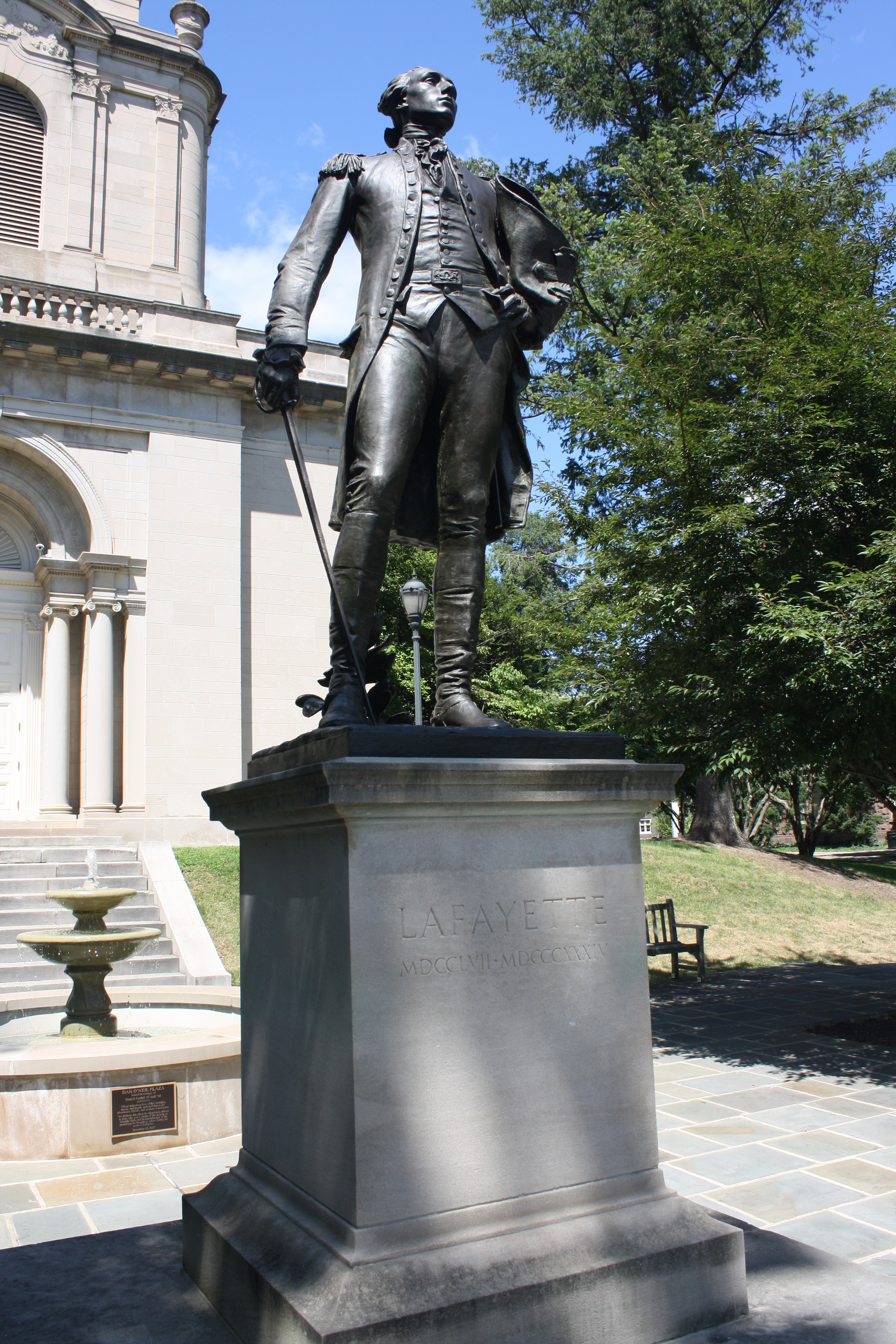
- The statue in 2013
- Interactive map of Statue of the Marquis de Lafayette
- Location: Lafayette College, Easton, Pennsylvania
- Coordinates: 40°41′51.3″N 75°12′32.2″W
- Designer: Daniel Chester French; Henry Bacon (pedestal)
- Builder: Gorham foundry
- Material: Bronze; Concrete (pedestal)
- Beginning date: 1921
- Completion date: 1921
- Dedicated date: October 20, 1921
- Dedicated to: Gilbert du Motier, Marquis de Lafayette

Marquis de Lafayette is a monumental statue on the campus of Lafayette College in Easton, Pennsylvania. The statue, designed by Daniel Chester French and standing on a pedestal designed by Henry Bacon, was dedicated in 1921 in honor of the college's namesake, Gilbert du Motier, Marquis de Lafayette. The statue is located at the south entrance of Colton Chapel. It is one of a number of sculptures made by French for universities, which includes the statue of John Harvard at Harvard University and Alma Mater at Columbia University.

== History ==
=== Background ===
Daniel Chester French was an American sculptor active during the late 1800s and early 1900s who was well known for, among other things, his sculptures commemorating individuals from the American Revolutionary War. In 1885, he submitted an entry in a competition to design a statue of the Marquis de Lafayette in Washington, D.C., but his proposal was passed over in favor of a design by French sculptors Alexandre Falguière and Antonin Mercié. Years after the competition in 1917, French designed the Lafayette Memorial in Brooklyn's Prospect Park. During the designing of this statue, French had created a plaster mold of Lafayette, which he later donated to Lafayette College in Easton, Pennsylvania after hearing that the college was seeking to erect a statue of their namesake, Gilbert du Motier, Marquis de Lafayette. With the donation, the college arranged to have the mold cast in bronze and erected on their campus. According to a report by the National Park Service, the statue on Lafayette College's campus "probably most approximates French's competition entry for the Lafayette statue in Washington." An alumnus of the college convinced Morris L. Clothier (a member of The Pennsylvania Society) of Philadelphia to fund the casting and installation of the statue. On October 20, 1920, the college accepted the gift from Clothier, and that same year he was granted the honorary degree of Doctor of Laws for his contributions. The statue was cast at the Gorham foundry, while the pedestal was designed by architect Henry Bacon.

=== Dedication and recent history ===
The statue was dedicated on the university's annual Founder's Day, on November 17, 1921. Notable attendees at the ceremony included Pennsylvania Governor William Cameron Sproul, Associate Justice William I. Schaffer of the Supreme Court of Pennsylvania (the ceremony's orator), Pennsylvania Attorney General George E. Alter, and Clothier as the special guest of honor. At the dedication ceremony, French was awarded the honorary degree of Legum Doctor (LL.D.) by the college.

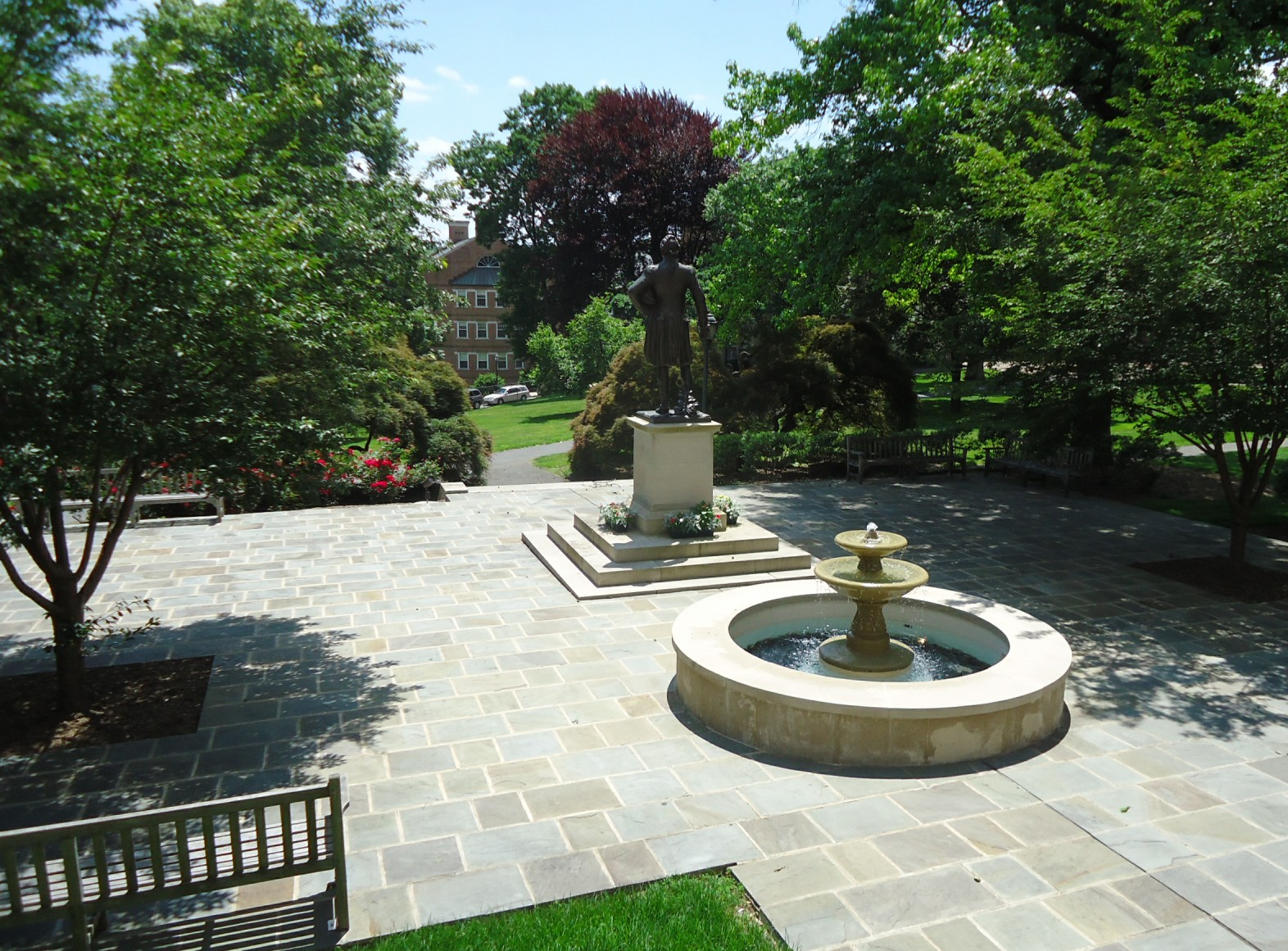
View of the statue and plaza following renovations

In 2007, the statue and surrounding area underwent a significant renovation that saw the creation of a new plaza surrounding the monument. The plaza includes a fountain, benches, and flagstone patio. The renovations were part of the college's celebration of the 250th anniversary of Lafayette's birth.

== Design ==
Located at the south entrance of Colton Chapel, the statue faces southward. Marquis has a sword drawn in one hand, with an article in the magazine Architecture saying Lafayette is depicted as a "youthful soldier". The base of the monument is made of concrete and features the following quote from Lafayette inscribed on it: "I read, I study, I examine, I listen, I reflect and out of all this I try to form an idea into which I put as much common sense as I can."

== See also ==
- 1921 in art
- Public sculptures by Daniel Chester French

== Sources ==
- "Lafayette College and the Lafayette Statue". Architecture. XLV (1). Charles Scribner's Sons: 9. January 1922 – via Google Books.
- Ferree, Barr, ed. (1921). Year Book of the Pennsylvania Society. New York City: The Pennsylvania Society – via Google Books.
- Holzer, Harold (2019). Monument Man: The Life and Art of Daniel Chester French. Princeton Architectural Press. ISBN 978-1-61689-829-8 – via Google Books.
- "New "Home" for Daniel Chester French Statue of Lafayette". Lafayette News. September 7, 2007. Archived from the original on July 21, 2015.
- Biographical Sketches of American Artists (5th ed.). Lansing, Michigan: Michigan State Library. 1924 – via Google Books.
- President's Park Notes: Statues. National Park Service. December 2003 – via Google Books.
- "NOTES AND NEWS". Pennsylvania School Journal. LXX (5). Pennsylvania State Education Association: 192–198. January 1922 – via Google Books.
- Sprague, Elmer (2008). Brooklyn Public Monuments: Sculpture for Civic Memory and Urban Pride. Dog Ear Publishing. ISBN 978-1-59858-582-7 – via Google Books.
