= Jim Toia =

American artist and art professor

Jim Toia is an American studio artist and professor of art.

== Early life ==
Toia was born in the U.S. state of New Jersey. He attended Lawrenceville School where he discovered an Amanita muscaria on the school grounds and researched its deadly attributes. At Bard College he took Field Studies in Natural History with biologist Bill Maple. At Bard, Toia studied art with Jim Sullivan, Nancy Mitchnick and Jake Greossberg. He received his MFA from the School of Visual Arts and worked with Loren Madsen, Judy Pfaff, Lucio Pozzi, Petah Coyne, Jackie Windsor, and Bill Tucker. Before SVA he attended a studio program in Urbino, Italy where he discussed his work with visiting artists in residence Eliseo Mattiacci, Enzo Cucchi, and Jannis Kounnelis.

== Career ==
=== Early career ===
In the 1980s, Toia was a Studio Assistant to Stephen Antonakos. Toia traveled internationally with Antonakos, installing permanent installations as well as large scale exhibitions.

After graduate school, while pursuing his art career, Toia taught at County College of Morris in Randolph, NJ and subsequently became Gallery Director there and then at Lafayette College from 1998-2008.

=== Studio art ===
Toia had his first solo exhibition in 1986 and has since been showing his spore drawings, inky cap paintings, ant hill castings, and more in exhibitions and residencies in the US and abroad. In March 2002, his works were displayed at the Hunterdon Art Museum in Clinton, New Jersey in an exhibition entitled "Jim Toia: Groundwork" and featuring mushrooms as both source and subject. In 2020, Toia completed a residency with boxoPROJECTS in Joshua Tree, CA where he developed works around the study and manipulation of images of the desert crust. Toia is represented by the Kim Foster Gallery in New York City.

=== Teaching ===
Toia is a professor of studio art at Lafayette College in Easton, Pennsylvania where he is involved with the Community Based Learning programs and the Creative and Performing Arts (CaPA) Fellowship, and also leads an arts mentorship program with the local Easton Area High School.

He is also the Chair of the Karl Stirner Arts Trail also in Easton, Pennsylvania.

=== Bibliography ===
- Tying & Untying. Cowritten with Lee Upton. Clinton, NJ: Lucia Press, 2012.
