= Steve Tobin =

American sculptor (born 1957)

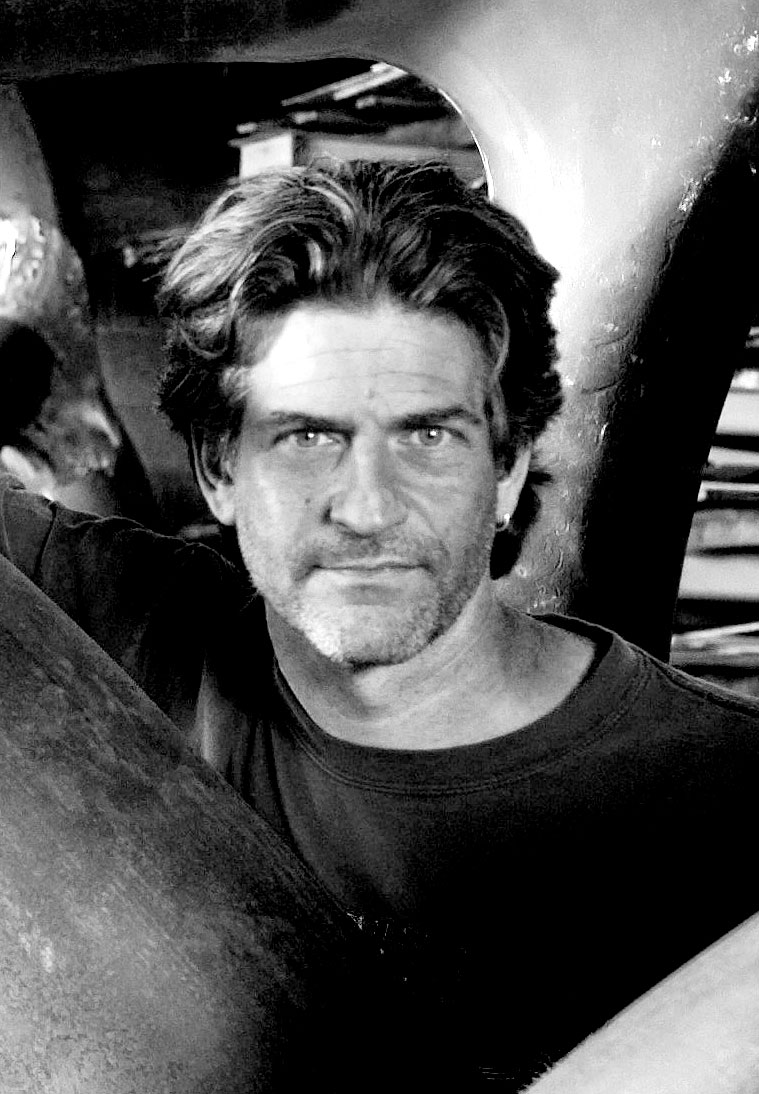
- Born: 1957 (age 68–69); Philadelphia, Pennsylvania
- Education: Studied math and physics, B.S., 1979
- Alma mater: Tulane University
- Notable work: Trinity Root bronze sculpture (2005)
- Website: https://stevetobin.com/

Steve Tobin (born 1957, Philadelphia, Pennsylvania) is an American sculptor. Newsweek heralded Tobin's artistic mission "to make people look at natural objects in new ways".

He studied theoretical mathematics at Tulane University, graduating with a B.S. in 1979, and works from a studio/foundry in Bucks County, Pennsylvania.

Much of his work draws inspiration from nature, combining a range of materials, found objects and techniques, including reappropriating industrial products. Tobin is most known for the Trinity Root (2005), placed at St. Paul's Chapel in Lower Manhattan, New York City.

His oeuvre ranges from small scale to monumental sculptures that “may be situated in a variety of environments, both indoors and out. Harkening back to late modernist abstraction, they bring the organic into the monumental, but instead of being a self-referential sculptural object, they are intended to be environments in themselves interacting with the surrounding spaces”. Curator David Houston wrote that “Tobin’s work is anchored by two distinct themes. The first obvious and most dominant one is nature. His Steel Roots, Bronze Roots, Termite Hills, and the New Nature Series all reinterpret natural forms through deeply poetic visual languages that reach beyond the realm of appearance” (Houston 2009, p. 13). “The use of found objects, Tobin’s second major concern, is easily identifiable in his “shelter” pieces: matzoh bread, individually bronzed; Korean War–era tank windows; glass magic lantern slides. (Less known is that the ethereal Waterglass installations are also composed of found objects, thousands of pieces of glass capillary tubing resourced from a landfill)” (Houston 2019: p. 14). His works “blend art and science, although presented formally in the language of sculpture, they are more deeply rooted in philosophy and theoretical science than in art or art history” (Warmus 2001: p. 31).

== Influences ==
Tobin revels in the life of objects and inspired by artists such as Alexander Calder and Henry Moore, whom he admires for the attitude that “a work can have in it a pent-up energy, an intense life of its own, independent of the object it may represent”. Tobin's experimental approach to artistic processes is influenced by diverse international traditions and classic artistic traditions such as Venetian glass art, ceramic sculpture, casting in bronze and steel, East Asian art, and ground-breaking upcycling of found industrial objects. His approach evolved during years of teaching and exhibiting internationally, including in the USA, Italy, Finland, Belgium, Korea, Japan, and China, and adopting art philosophies such as wabi-sabi. His work has been related to monumental art and large works such as Louis Bourgeois' spider although “less emotional”. Donald Kuspit called Tobin’s use of found materials “assisted readymades” related to Marcel Duchamp’s readymades.

== Biography ==
Tobin grew up near Philadelphia and earned a B.S. degree from Tulane University. He was exploring the natural world through art and science since youth and simultaneously studied glass and ceramics at Tulane; this “fascination with the scientific world, particularly as it related to his feeling for nature, became the foundation upon which he ultimately built his art career” (Warmus, 2001: p. 31).

In the 1980s Tobin taught and was resident artist at Tokyo Glass Art Studio, where he learned Japanese and was profoundly impacted by Japanese culture and arts, particularly calligraphy and the ceramic vessels of the tea ceremony (Hoban: p 158). He first became known for a series of tall (five to fifteen feet) blown-glass Cocoons started in 1984 at Creative Glass Center of America (WheatonArts) in Wheaton, New Jersey, which were shown widely. The Cocoons led to being invited to set up a studio to work in glass alongside masters in Murano, Venice.

During the 1990s, he transitioned from glass to metal. Some of the highlights of Tobin’s glass installations are the Cocoons hung in a chapel (now arts center) in Antwerp, Belgium 1990, and in 1993, at Retretti in Punkaharju, Finland, an art museum in a series of caves. He filled the caves with "totemic" glass Doors sculptures, and created a 100 feet (30 meters) long river from strands of glass capillary tubes called Retretti River. After the exhibition, he ceased working with glass. As Hoban notes: “...the Cocoons became a turning point: Tobin realized that his real interest was not in craft, which he had clearly mastered, but in ideas” (2009: p 159). He turned to metal as his next medium, building a bronze foundry in 1994 that enabled him to cast his several-part Earth Bronze series.

In the late 1990s, he had numerous shows, including at the American Museum of Natural History, the Fuller Craft Museum in Massachusetts, and OK Harris in New York City, featuring earlier work and a series of bronze castings of Ghanaian termite hills. The molds, some as tall as 15 feet, were accomplished in collaboration with an entire Ghanaian village and transported to the artist’s studio in Pennsylvania, where they were cast in bronze. “The casts reproduce every nook and cranny of the original surfaces of the termite hills. Tobin calls the mounds a form of natural architecture--insects make the blueprints, and the resulting structures serve as shelters just as human-made buildings do”.

In the 2000s Tobin’s cast bronze and steel sculptures were shown widely and he became affiliated with Ivan Karp (an influential art dealer at OK Harris) until Karp’s death in 2012. In 2001, Warmus wrote that “Tobin’s most significant body of work is the Earth Bronze Trilogy, consisting of the Forest Floor pieces, Termite Hills, and the exposed Roots. Like a set of three connected novels, each explores a different aspect of the ground under our feet.” His casting approach was termed "alchemy" by Hoban: “Tobin isn’t simply emulating or copying nature: through the alchemy of his sophisticated casting process, which uses high temperatures and a specially fortified ceramic mold, he has actually turned the patch of earth into bronze […] in the extraordinary Forest Floor pieces” (2009: p. 159).

In 2002, the Page Museum in Los Angeles gave an exhibition of his work titled "Tobin's Naked Earth: Nature as Sculpture", beside the La Brea Tar Pits. The show included castings of termite hills, tree roots, and a large sculpture fashioned mainly from cow bones.

In 2005, Tobin installed what is perhaps his best known work, Trinity Root, originally placed at St. Paul's Chapel in Lower Manhattan, New York City. During the September 11 attacks on the World Trade Center, the chapel had been partly shielded from damage by a 70-year-old sycamore tree. He created a bronze sculpture of the tree's stump and roots, which were shown in front of the church on the corner of Wall Street and Broadway. Tobin was already working with roots "The function for me of roots is to show the power of the unseen," he said. "And on 9/11 we found out about the power of all of our unseen connections, the things that nurture us that are hidden below the surface."

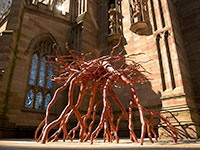
The 20 feet high Trinity Root bronze sculpture by Steve Tobin commemorates the original sycamore tree that protected the St. Paul's Chapel during the 9/11 attacks in New York City.

The 9/11 Memorial & Museum has a Trinity Root large-scale model on permanent display. The Trinity Root sculpture was highlighted by Chief Curator Ramirez as “striking not only for its ambitious scale and engineering virtuosity but also because of the tree’s presentation as something other than terrestrial branches, foliage, and woody surfaces. Instead, Tobin monumentalized the [...] once-concealed, skeletal roots. The choice provokes questions that seem to transcend the tree’s predicament, inviting reflection on the source of civilization’s endurance and weaknesses; of humankind’s capacity for cooperation and goodwill as well as for inflicting pain and injustices on one another.”

During the 2000s Tobin also developed the Exploded Earth series made by exploding small charges in blocks of clay and then firing the results, and showed conceptual paintings made with found materials at OK Harris.

In the 2010s, he exhibited in various museums and outdoor spaces, such as solo shows at the United States Botanic Gardens, (Washington, D.C.), and Payne Gallery of Moravian College where two of his outdoor Steelroots sculpture series are on permanent display. His Aerial Roots were featured in an outdoor installation covering seven acres at "Grounds for Sculpture", 2012 curated by State of the Arts New Jersey and presented in their video series. In 2014, a solo show "Out of this World: Works by Steve Tobin" was held in the galleries and sculpture garden of the James A. Michener Art Museum.

In 2016, Tobin was the featured artist in Shanghai, China for the Sixth Annual Jing’An International Sculpture Project (JISP) Expo. His studio shipped 48 bronze and steel sculptures for the installation, including several from his monumental Steelroots Series. Tobin's sculptures were showcased and sited at several places around the city of Shanghai, including in front of the Shanghai Natural History Museum and in Jing’An Sculpture Park, where they are still installed.

From 2020 onward, Tobin has had traveling indoor and outdoor sculpture exhibitions in public environments such as the Naples Botanical Garden (2020), Houston Botanic Gardens (2023), a retrospective “Everything Grows” at gallery Shanghai Station 1907, Shanghai (2023–24), and at the Imua Discovery Garden, in Maui, Hawaii (2024). As of 2024 his work is represented by the international Sundaram Tagore Gallery, and was included in their show at Art Basel in Miami Beach, 2024.

From April 2025 until February 2026, seven of his large New York Roots sculpture series are installed in Manhattan by the Garment District Alliance as their latest public art exhibit, located on the Broadway plazas between 39th and 40th Streets and 40th and 41st Streets. Time Out New York reviewed the massive art installation by Tobin as appearing to be ‘growing’ out of midtown and inviting reflection, urging viewers to stay grounded. Time Out New York also recommended Tobin's public art installation as number one on their best outdoor art in NYC list for spring 2025.

== Social Activism ==
Tobin’s artistic practice has activist aspects in terms of addressing natural phenomena as “powerful”, involving collaboration with local people, getting inspiration from traditional art techniques, and striving for energy neutrality. His studio runs on solar energy and he has continually integrated salvaged materials as sculptural elements, including military tank windows, antique glass magic lantern educational slides, glass tubes, and steel pipes from Bethlehem Steel.

Tobin has initiated community-oriented art activities that celebrate nature as restorative for people. For instance, he was inspired to make Trinity Root to commemorate 9/11 after learning of the sycamore tree and seeing its upturned roots, but proceeded only after speaking with survivors and families about his plans. In 2009, he made termite hill molds in collaboration with the villagers of Nsawam in Ghana. The resulting cast bronze Termite Hill sculptures, when shown in Manhattan, were intended to evoke “a fresh sense of wonder, particularly given their juxtaposition with one of the best-known skylines in the world and their multicultural connotation.” In 2024, his exhibition "Earth to Sky" on Maui supported the charitable organization Imua Family Services with proceeds directly contributing to improve resources to children with challenges. Imua Discovery Garden and local educators and families collaborated with Tobin on promoting the show with the theme of celebrating Art, Nature, and Families on Maui in a joint effort to attract tourism after the Maui fires.

== Selected Museum and Public Collections ==
List from the artist's website:

- 9/11 Memorial & Museum, New York, New York
- America Center, Helsinki, Finland
- American Museum of Ceramic Art, Pomona, California
- American Museum of Glass, Millville, New Jersey
- Boca Raton Museum of Art, Mizner Park, Boca Raton, Florida
- Carnegie Museum of Art, Pittsburgh, Pennsylvania
- City of Calgary, Canada
- City of Osaka, Japan
- Coastal Maine Botanical Gardens, Boothbay, Maine
- Coca-Cola Corporation Collection, Atlanta, Georgia
- CSC Global, Wilmington, Delaware
- Florida International University, Miami, Florida
- Fordhook Farms, Doylestown, Pennsylvania
- City of Quakertown, Pennsylvania
- Frost Art Museum, Miami, Florida
- Golisano Children’s Museum of Naples, Naples, Florida
- Gratz College, Elkins Park, Pennsylvania
- Grounds for Sculpture, Hamilton, New Jersey
- James A. Michener Museum of Art, Doylestown, Pennsylvania
- Jing’An International Sculpture Project, Shanghai, China
- Karl Stirner Arts Trail, Easton, Pennsylvania
- King Faisal’s Palace, Riyadh, Saudi Arabia
- Lehigh University Museum of Art, Lehigh, Pennsylvania
- Lowe Art Museum, Miami, Florida
- Moravian College, Bethlehem, Pennsylvania
- Musée des Arts Décoratifs, Lausanne, Switzerland
- Museum of American Glass, Millville, New Jersey
- Museum of Art and Design (MAD), New York, New York
- New Orleans Museum of Art, New Orleans, Louisiana
- Palmer Museum of Art at Penn State University, Philadelphia, Pennsylvania
- Philadelphia Museum of Art, Philadelphia, Pennsylvania
- Philip and Muriel Berman Museum of Art, Ursinus College, Collegeville, Pennsylvania
- Retretti Art Centre, Punkajarju, Finland
- Stephane Janssen Collection, Phoenix, Arizona, Santa Fe, New Mexico
- Toledo Museum of Art, Toledo, Ohio
- White House Permanent Art Collection, Washington, D.C
