= Miami University Press =

University press

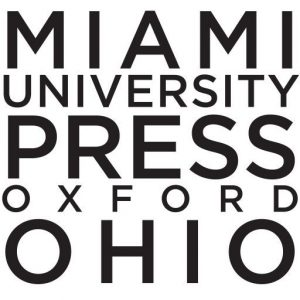
- The logo of Miami University Press
- Parent company: Miami University
- Country of origin: United States
- Headquarters location: Oxford, Ohio
- Publication types: Books
- Official website: sites.miamioh.edu/miami-university-press/

Miami University Press is a university press affiliated with Miami University in Oxford, Ohio. The press specializes in works of poetry, fiction, and those that detail the history of Miami University. Miami University Press was founded in 1992 by Miami University English professor James Reiss. It currently hosts an annual "Miami University Press Novella" contest.

== See also ==
- List of English-language book publishing companies
- List of university presses
