= Campus of Lafayette College =

College campus in Pennsylvania, U.S.

Coordinates: 40.698°N 75.208°W

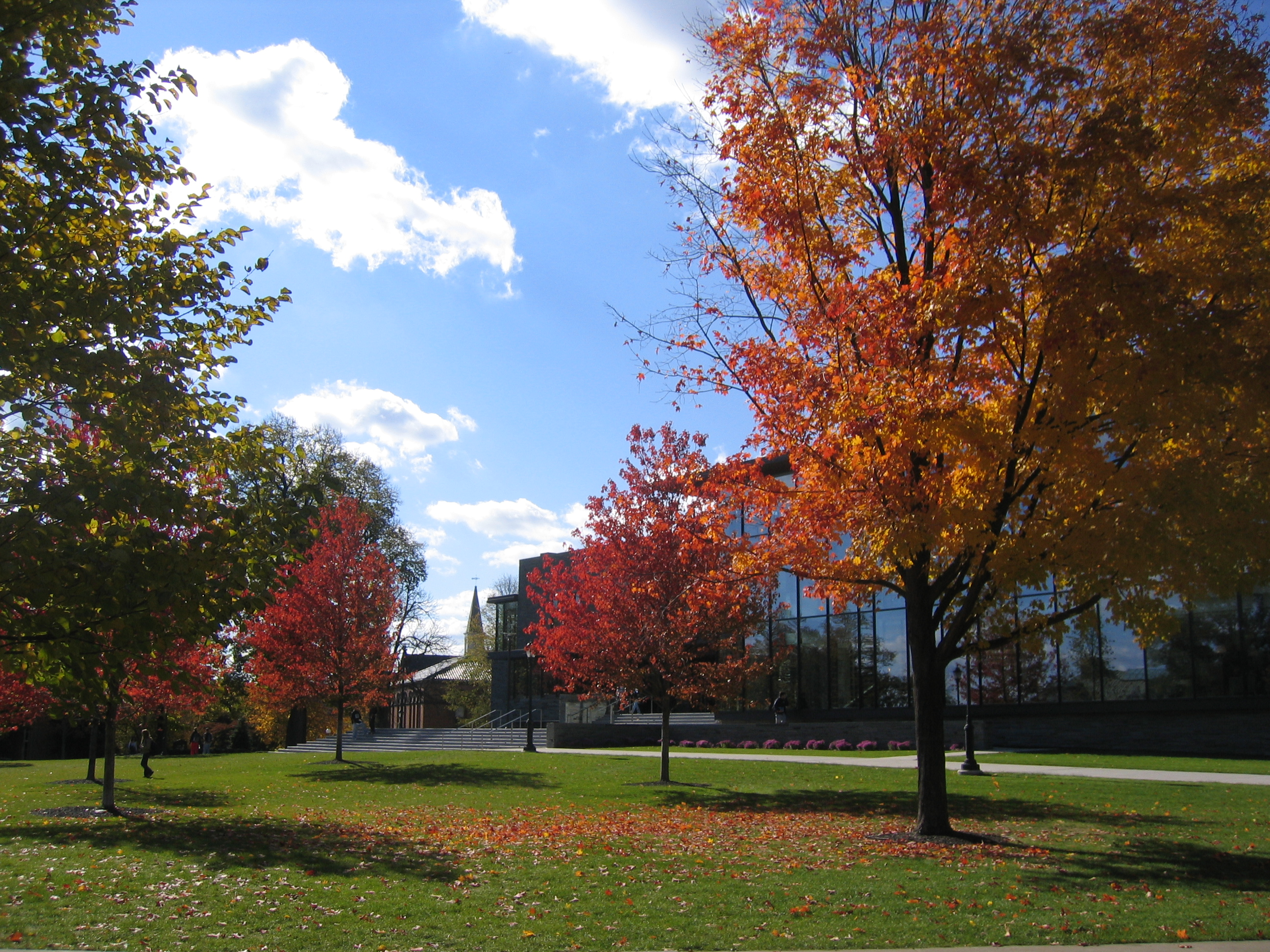
A view of Skillman Library from the quad with Van Wickle Hall and the spire of South College in the background.

The Lafayette College campus is a 110-acre suburban area located on College Hill in Easton, Pennsylvania, United States. Lafayette College also owns and maintains a 230-acre athletic complex, the Metzgar Fields Athletic Complex. The school is roughly 70 mi (110 km) west of New York City and 60 mi (97 km) north of Philadelphia.

The main campus borders the downtown area of Easton to the south, the College Hill Residential Historic District to the north east, and is situated almost directly on the Delaware River.

== Architecture ==
Lafayette's campus architecture is highly varied with elements of many styles visible. While the overall architectural style cannot be singularly determined, examples from Beaux-Arts, Postmodernism, Gothic Revival, Richardsonian Romanesque, and Second Empire architecture are clearly visible on campus.

The original college buildings were planned facing the city of Easton, but as the college expanded the architecture was redefined around a central quad. As a result, the quad is addressed by the backs of the earliest buildings.

In 1909, the Olmsted Brothers, one of the most influential landscape architectural firms at the time, were commissioned to produce a report on Lafayette's campus. In it, they praised the topography and grounds of the college, but lamented at a lack of harmony in architectural style. (Note: The Olmsted Brothers wrote: "The general aspect of the group of College buildings is, unfortunately, not so admirable. Like most other American colleges which have had a gradual growth, there is a regrettable lack of architectural harmony between most buildings. Surely no reputable architect employed to design these buildings at one time, or during a brief period, would have for a moment considered it desirable or good art to design almost every building in a different style and of several different exterior materials and colors.") However, this "architectural eclecticism" has been a purposeful tradition at Lafayette, and has also been a source of praise; as the campus was not constructed all at once, the style of buildings reflect the time periods in which they were constructed. Nonetheless, during the college's expansion in the twentieth century, most of the buildings adopted the uniform of red brick buildings in the Colonial Revival style, allowing for more architectural unity.

== Academic buildings ==
=== Acopian Engineering Center ===
Acopian Engineering Center holds the college's programs in mechanical, chemical, electrical, and civil engineering. It is named for Sarkis Acopian, class of 1951, whose contributions to the college allowed for the renovation of three buildings to be combined into one center. The first engineering center in the complex, the Eleanor Dana Engineering building, was completed in 1912 with a fund secured by Andrew Carnegie for the endowment of a course in mechanical engineering. With this fund, the college planned to create a large building with separate wings for their emergent engineering courses. On June 13, 1953, a second building in the complex was constructed known as the Alumni Hall of Engineering. In 1966, an addition to that building dedicated as Dana Hall was completed, and the metallurgical engineering department moved there from the basement of Markle Hall. Acopian's donation in 2003 bridged these buildings together under one single center bearing his name.

=== Hugel Science Center ===
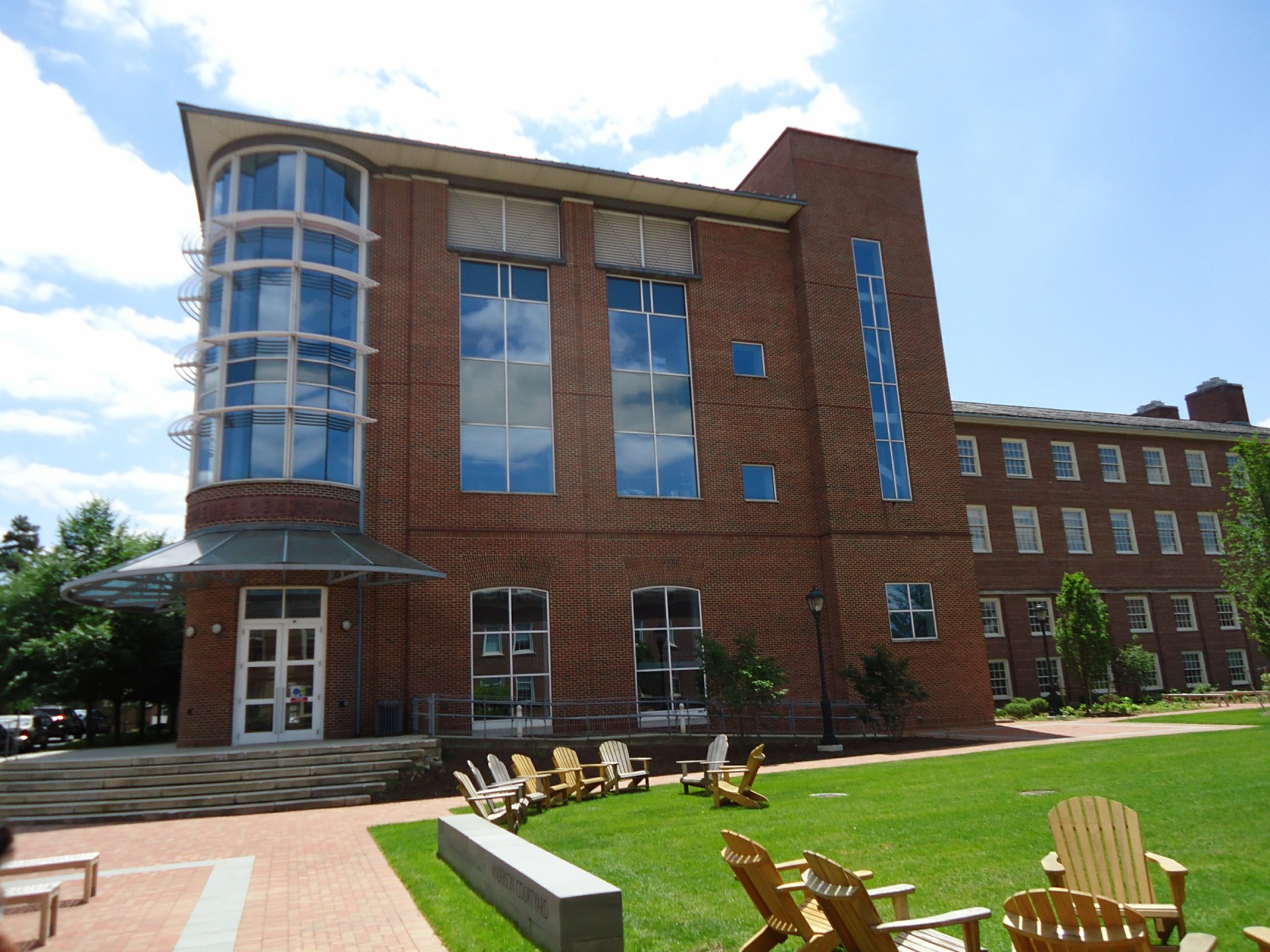
Hugel Science Center

Hugel Science Center houses Lafayette's programs in chemistry, physics, and biochemistry. It is named for Charles E. Hugel, class of 1951, and his wife, Cornelia F. Hugel. Originally built as Olin Hall of Science in 1957, the building received a $25 million upgrade in 2001 to renovate the existing 50,000 square foot structure and add 40,000 square feet to its east end.

=== Kirby Hall of Civil Rights ===
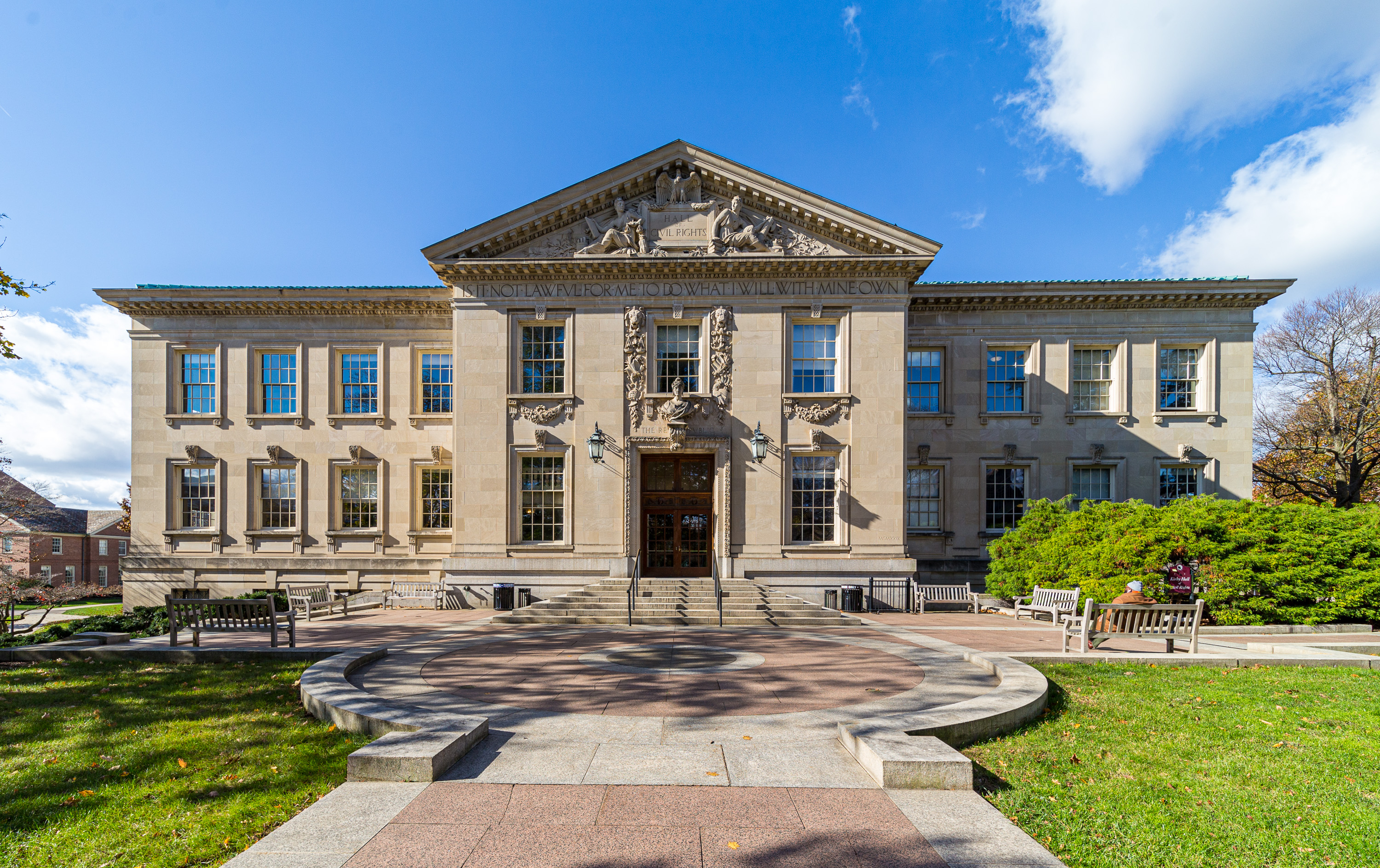
Kirby Hall of Civil Rights

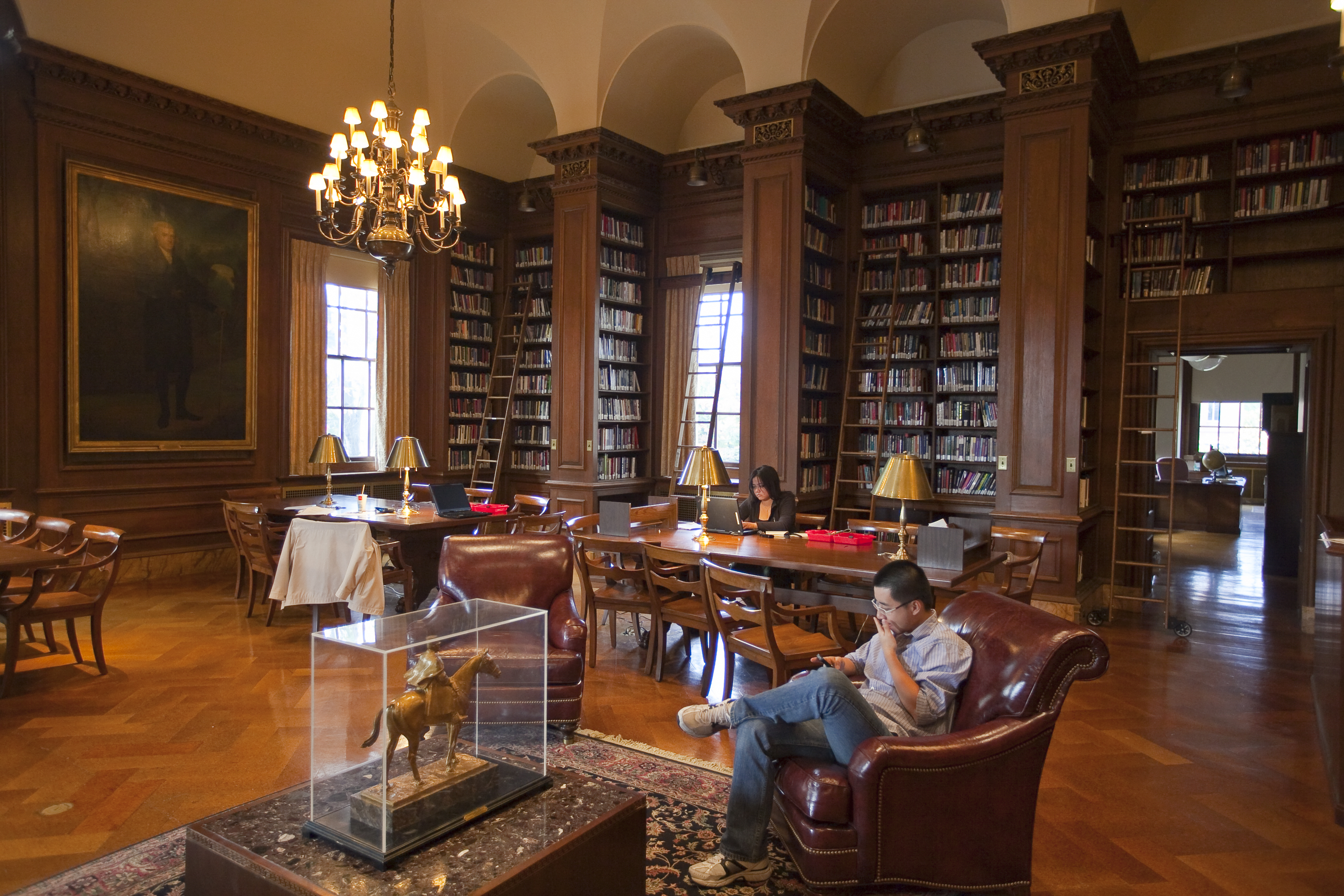
Second floor oak-paneled library in Kirby Hall of Civil Rights

The Kirby Hall of Civil Rights is home to Lafayette's Government and Law Department. It also houses Lafayette's second library, with a collection of over 30,000 volumes related to government and law. It was the first of many buildings to be named after philanthropist Fred Morgan Kirby after he made a donation of 1,000 shares of stock in the F. W. Woolworth Company, of which he was co-founder and vice-president. With each share valued at $100, this donation was worth $100,000 in total, though with the swelling of a bull market in the early 1920s the college ended up selling their shares for over $538,000. In 1921, Kirby had created an endowment for the Kirby Professorship in Civil Rights. By 1930, in an effort to grow the department, he donated an additional $590,000 (equivalent to $8,793,000 in 2024 dollars) to fund the construction of the Hall of Civil Rights. Upon its dedication, Kirby Hall was said to be one of the finest academic buildings on an American college campus.

Construction of the Hall began on October 10, 1929, in the footprint of the old gymnasium which had been demolished to make room for its successor. The famed architectural group Warren and Wetmore were hired to construct the building in the Beaux-Arts style. The exterior of the building was built out of Indiana limestone and Woodbury granite, while the interior was decorated in travertine imported from Italy. An ornate oak-paneled library was constructed on the second floor, a large classroom placed on the first, with more classrooms constructed in the basement. Around the four walls of the exterior of the building the following inscriptions were carved in the stone: The front reads a line from the Gospel of Matthew, "Is it not lawful for me to do what I will with mine own?" (Matthew 20:15), while the back reads a line of Herbert Spencer, "Every man is free to do that which he will provided he infringes not the equal freedom of any other man." The north side of the building reads, "Every man is the architect of his own fortune" (Pseudo-Sallust), while the south reads a line from Ecclesiastes, "Whatever Thy hand findeth to do, do with it Thy might" (Ecclesiastes 9:10). Additionally, a bust of The Republic was placed over the front door. According to historians, the building was meant to be "one of the outstanding college buildings in America," and was rumored to be per square foot the most expensive building of its day. It's also purported to be the first college building of its time expressly made for the study of government and law, with press lauding it as a "practical step forward".

=== Kunkel Hall ===
Kunkel Hall houses Lafayette's program in Biology. The building was dedicated in 1969 to Dr. Beverly W. Kunkel who had led the school's biology program for 37 years and in that time tutored two Nobel Prize winners; Philip Showalter Hench, and Haldan Keffer Hartline. Before the construction of Kunkel Hall, the biology program was housed unsatisfactorily in Jenks Hall. In 1966, the college received a $700,000 grant from the Longwood Foundation on the condition new buildings break ground by May 1, 1968. A necessary $800,000 was required to plan and construct Kunkel Hall which was provided for in part by federal grants and college supporters. Upon its completion, the 31,000 square foot building contained a warm-animal room, cold-animal room, radioisotope facility, multiple laboratories, a museum for the college's specimen collection, an auditorium, and a two-story greenhouse. A tunnel in the basement connected the building to what is presently Hugel Science Center.

=== Oechsle Center for Global Education ===
The Oechsle Center for Global Education was built in 2014 and houses the college's departments of international affairs, Africana studies, anthropology, and sociology. The 19,600 square foot building was constructed at a cost of $10.6 million, and its construction was launched by Mikhail Gorbachev during a speech he gave to the student body. Like Oeschle Hall, it was named after Walter, class of 1957, and Christa Oechsle who were longtime donors to the college.

=== Oechsle Hall ===
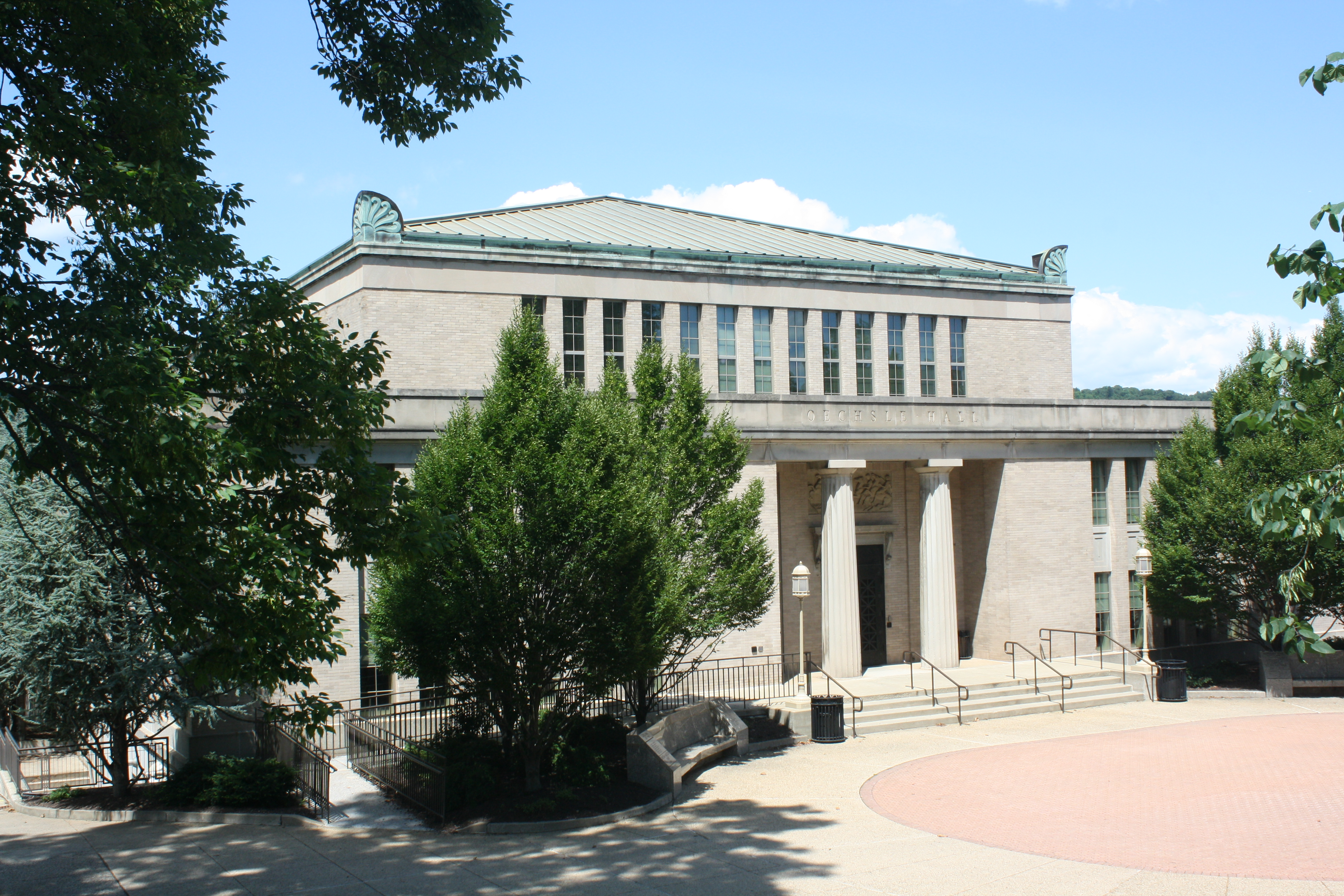
Oechsle Hall

Oechsle Hall is home to the college's psychology and neuroscience programs.

The building was originally known as the Alumni Memorial Gymnasium and was built as a memorial to the Lafayette alumni who had served in World War I, a group of over 1,000 students. The cost of the building was $300,000, and it was completed in 1924. Originally, this building was the home of the college's intramural sports and the school basketball team, though the size of the building was quickly deemed inadequate due to ever increasing student population sizes. As the largest indoor venue on campus it was also used to host large events hosted by figures such as Dwight D. Eisenhower, Erroll Garner, and Bill Cosby. By 1971, a new field house was under construction to host the college's basketball team, and renovations were undertaken to transform the gymnasium into a hall for concerts and lectures.

In 1998, Walter (class of 1957) and Christa Oechsle donated $12 million to the college endowment, with funds meant to re-purpose the building to house programs in psychology and neuroscience. The new building, renamed Oeschle Hall, opened on October 18, 2002.

=== Pardee Hall ===
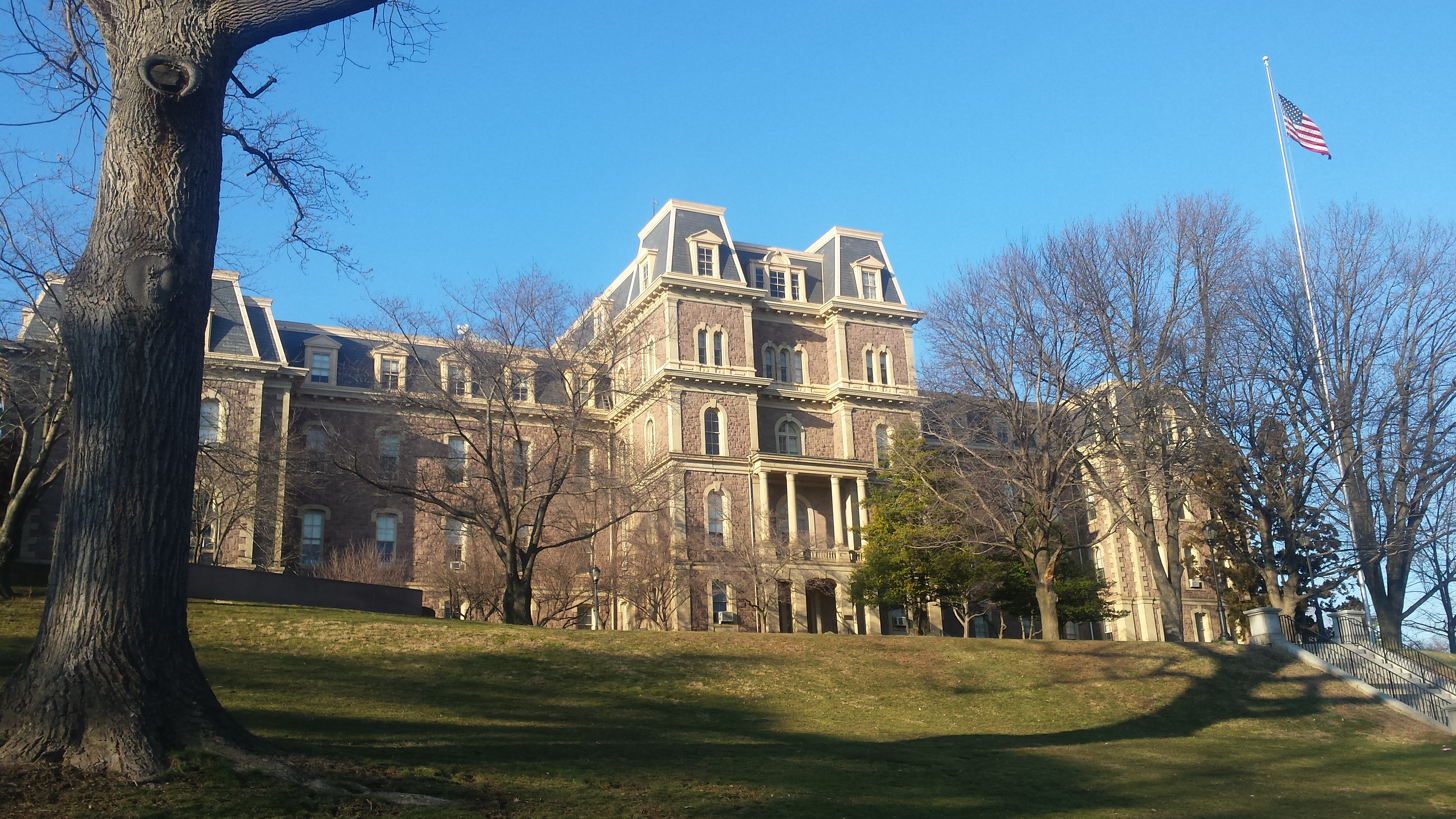
Pardee Hall

Pardee Hall is the most iconic building on the Lafayette College campus, and at the time of its completion was one of the largest collegiate buildings of its era. Initially created to house the college's science programs, it now houses the school's humanities, social sciences, and mathematics departments. It was designed by John McArthur Jr. in the Second Empire architecture style, and since its initial completion has been renovated three times – twice due to fire, and once after the second World War for modernization.

The initial construction of the building began after a $200,000 donation (equivalent to $4,656,000 in 2024 dollars) from Ario Pardee in 1871 during the administration of president William Cassady Cattell, who had begun a large fund raising campaign to save the college from financial ruin. Construction of the building took two years, and Pardee Hall was officially designated as the campus scientific building on October 21, 1873. A crowd of over 20,000 marched through Easton on the day of dedication, and the dedication of the building was delivered by Rossiter W. Raymond. The final costs of its initial construction totaled over $250,000.

On June 4, 1879, Pardee Hall burned to the ground for the first time. Hot equipment not properly cooled in the chemistry lab on the top floor were to blame for the start of the fire, and late notice, combined with an unorganized firefighting patrol, led to the almost complete gutting of the building before the flames were extinguished. As the building was the cornerstone of the campus, efforts were made to immediately begin its reconstruction. At the cost of $130,000, Pardee Hall was rededicated on November 30, 1880, in view of an impressive assortment of individuals including General William Tecumseh Sherman, Secretary of War Alexander Ramsey, and President Rutherford B. Hayes. Hayes himself gave a speech during the re-dedication.

The second burning of Pardee Hall occurred on December 18, 1897, as an act out of revenge by disgruntled professor George H. Stephens. Stephens had made a pile of chairs, books, and other materials in the biology department, and then used gas and matches to set the pile aflame. He escaped to New York after watching the building light up in flame from the New Jersey border, but returned to Easton at the start of the new year to continue acts of vandalism on the campus. In June, he was accosted and admitted to the burning of Pardee. He also admitted to plans to burn down Colton Chapel later in the year. As before, Pardee was rebuilt identical to its former self on the exterior, with modern changes to its interior. It was re-dedicated, now for a third time, on May 31, 1899, and a Tiffany glass window titled Alcuin and Charlemagne was installed on its front edifice.

The last renovation of Pardee Hall occurred from 1964 to 1965. While iron railings around the perimeter of the roof were removed for the war efforts in WWII, the interior of building was updated to fit the demands of the college. The building was completely gutted, with every former item moved to a new location, including the Tiffany stained glass window which was later restored and displayed in the renovated Skillman Library. A basement was dug under the foundation, and the entire wooden interior was replaced with concrete offices and classrooms. The exterior was sandblasted and the roof completely removed and rebuilt, though after construction it looked largely like its former self.

=== Ramer History House ===
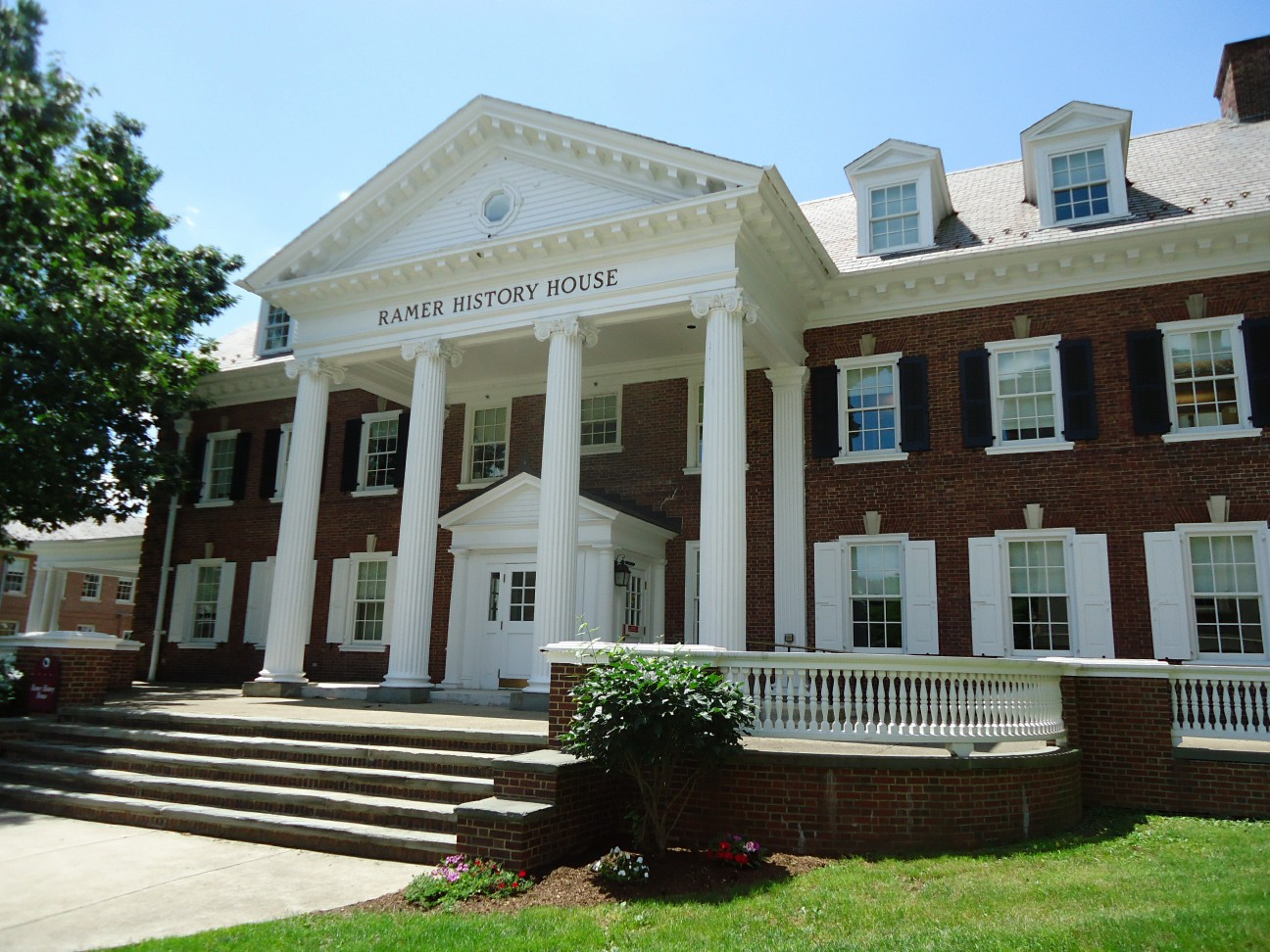
Ramer History House

Ramer History House contains the school's history department and is named for Lawrence J. Ramer, class of 1950. The Georgian building in which it resides was originally the fraternity house for Theta Delta Chi built in 1905. When the fraternity was removed from campus in 2001 due to disciplinary action the building was left empty. A renovation in 2006 transformed the fraternity building into an academic hall, with classrooms on the main level and offices on the second and third.

=== Rockwell Integrated Sciences Center ===
The Rockwell Integrated Sciences Center was completed in 2019 as the campus's new home for biology, neuroscience, and computer and environmental science. Named for S. Kent Rockwell, class of 1966, the $75 million building began construction in 2017 between Watson Hall and Acopian Engineering Center, and required the removal of the former plant operations and security buildings for its footprint. Mostly serving as an academic space, the center also hosts the new Hanson Center for Inclusive STEM Education, and the Dyer IDEAL Center for Innovation and Entrepreneurship.

=== Simon Center for Economics & Business ===
The Simon Center is the college's home to the economics department. It is named after former United States Secretary of the Treasury William E. Simon, class of 1952, who donated $3 million in 1984 to re-purpose the existing structure, Jenks Hall. Before the renovation, Jenks Hall hosted many different academic departments. Upon its completion in 1867, it housed the chemistry department. When that department moved to Gayley Hall in 1902, the biology program moved into Jenks Hall. When the biology program moved to Kunkel Hall in 1969, the music and art departments moved in. After the Williams Center for the Arts was completed in 1983, Jenks Hall was temporarily left empty. With Simon's donation the college combined Jenks Hall with a non-functioning steam plant directly adjacent to create the Simon Center.

=== Van Wickle Hall ===
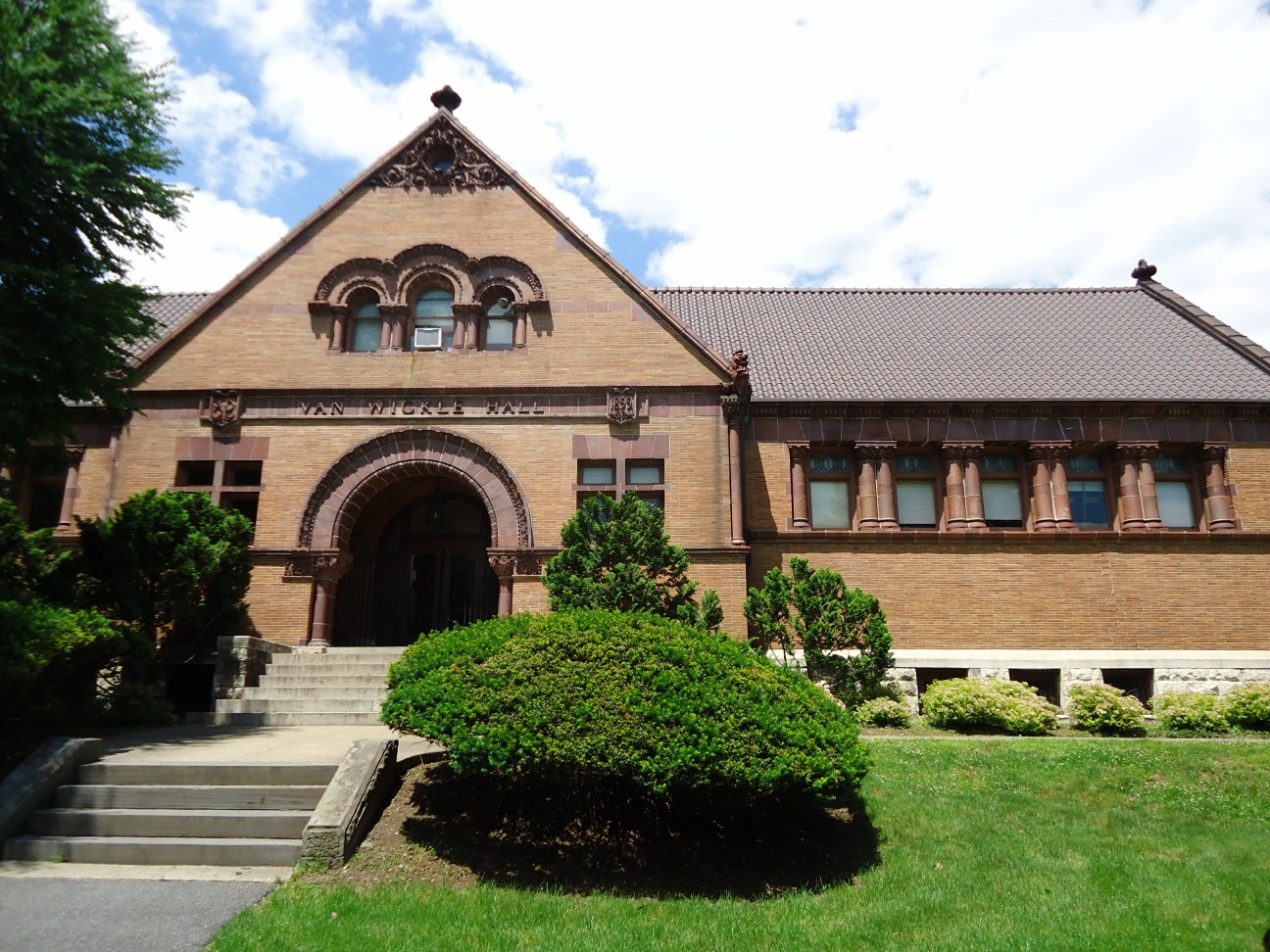
Van Wickle Hall

Van Wickle Hall is home to the college's geology department. It was originally called the Van Wickle Memorial Library, and was funded by Augustus Van Wickle (son-in-law to Ario Pardee) who left in his will $30,000 for its construction. Finished in 1900, it served as the college's first library. The building, constructed in the Romanesque Revival style, is constructed of mottled Pompeian brick with terra-cotta trimmings and a roof made of Spanish tiles, which originally featured eyebrow dormers. At the time of its completion, all 30,000 volumes previously housed elsewhere on campus were finally consolidated under one roof.

In 1913, the addition of extra stacks allowed the library to hold more books. This addition was expanded significantly in 1939 to double the size of the shelving in order to fit a quickly growing collection of books. When, in 1956 a Middle States Association survey of the college revealed the need for a better library building on campus, the college decided to convert Van Wickle into an academic building and construct the Skillman Library.

=== William C. Buck Hall ===
Buck Hall is one of the few academic buildings located at the base of College Hill, in the college's arts campus. Donated by William C. Buck, class of 1950, it was completed in 2016 at a cost of $21 million. Due to its location in a 100-year flood plain, the entire building is raised above the flood elevation, with the first occupied floors placed on the second level. The 18,000 square foot building contains a black box theater, 180-seat cinema, classrooms, and other various rooms for the college's art programs. The black box theater was named for former college president Daniel H. Weiss and his wife, Sandra Weiss.

=== Williams Center for the Arts ===
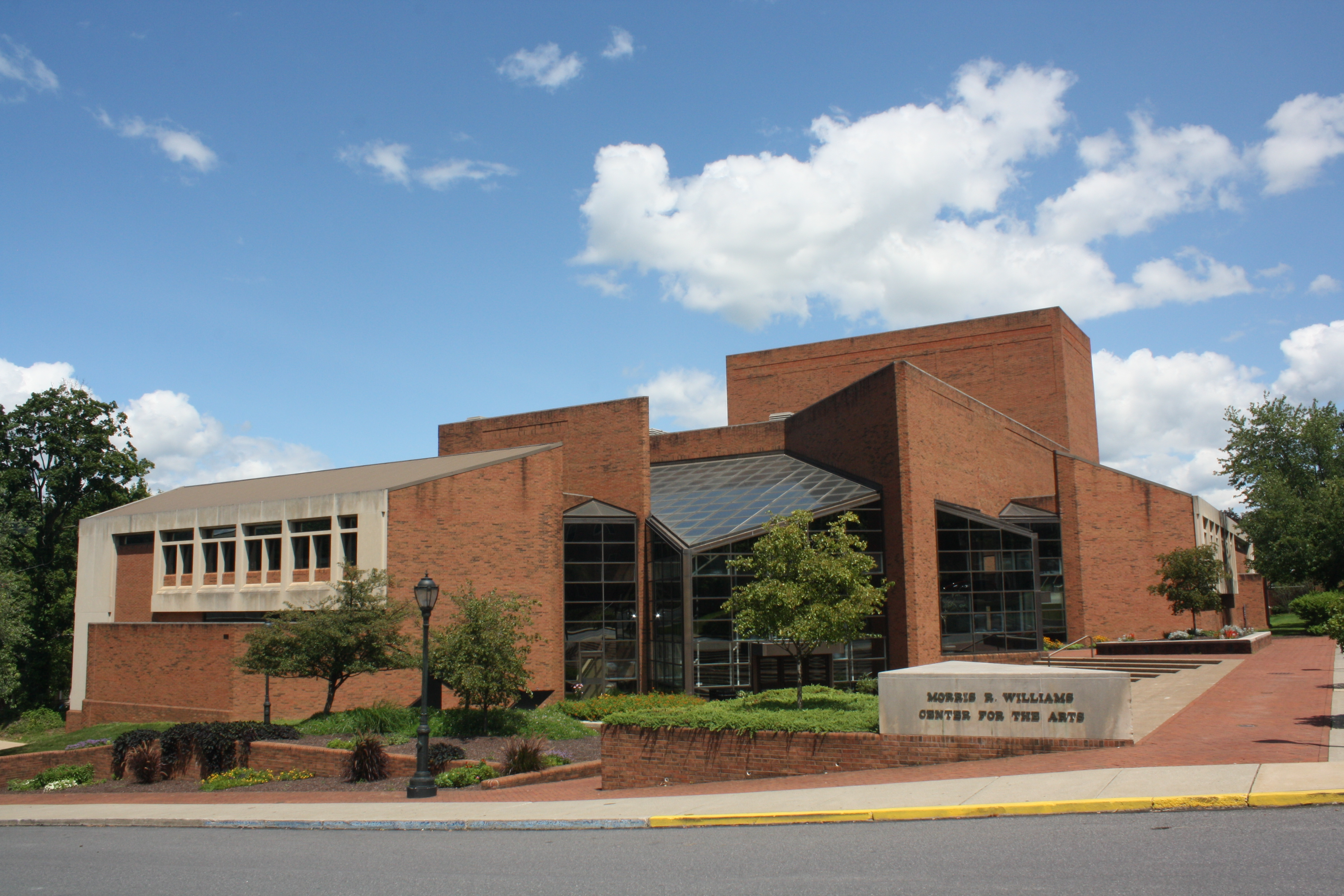
Williams Center for the Arts

The Williams Center for the Arts holds the music and theater programs. It opened in 1983 at a cost of $8.7 million, and was dedicated to Morris Williams, class of 1922, and his wife. The building is funded in part through the Pennsylvania Council on the Arts which helps maintain an art gallery and a theater for performance arts. Musicians such as Charles Lloyd, and Steve Coleman have performed at the center. It also hosts a travelling exhibition featuring various local artists, or prominent topics from the school's history, such as the college's Tiffany glass collection.

=== Williams Visual Arts Building ===
The Williams Visual Arts Building was the first location in the college's arts campus at the base of College Hill. It opened on April 24, 2001, and was donated by Morris R. Williams, class of 1922, and his wife, Josephine. The $1.7 million building was designed by Joseph Biondo, a local architect, and features several of his architectural models in its foyer. With a clinker brick exterior, the building was awarded the 2013 Citation of Merit by the American Institute of Architects, Pennsylvania Chapter.

== Administrative buildings ==
=== Markle Hall ===
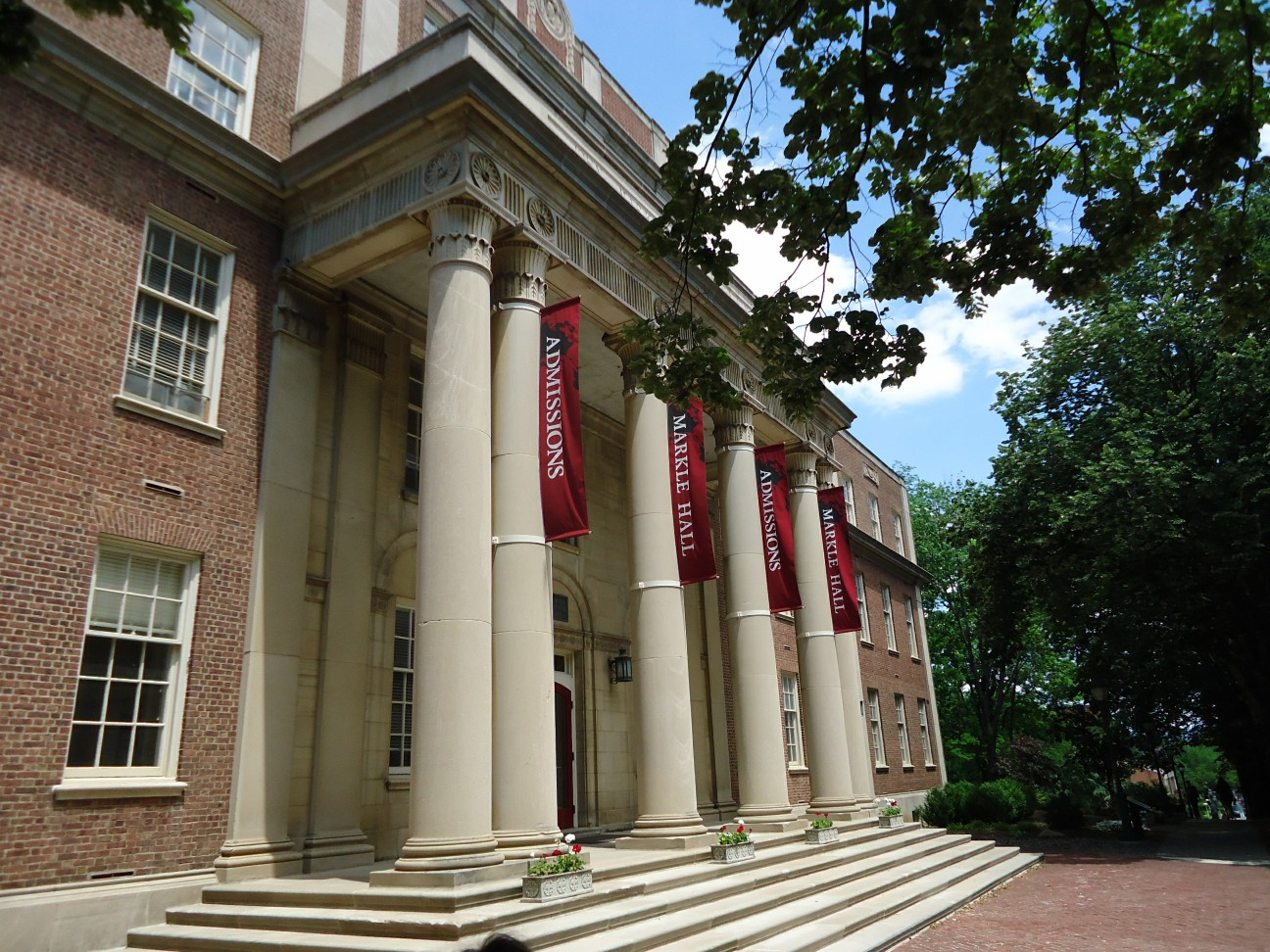
Markle Hall

Markle Hall is one of the main administrative buildings on campus, and the home of the college's admissions department. Constructed in 1929 through a donation by trustee John Markle for $500,000, the building was originally named the Markle Hall of Mining Engineering, and was built to sustain the college's mining engineering program. However, due to a small number of students enrolled in the program at the time of its construction, the building also housed the college's geology and metallurgy programs, and contained a small mining museum and department library. In 1963, while the new Skillman Library was under construction across the street, the decision was made to convert Markle Hall to an administrative building. The former library, Van Wickle Hall, was converted to house the geology program previously held in Markle Hall, while the metallurgical program remained in the basement until the department merged with the chemical engineering program housed next door in Acopian.

=== Scott Hall ===
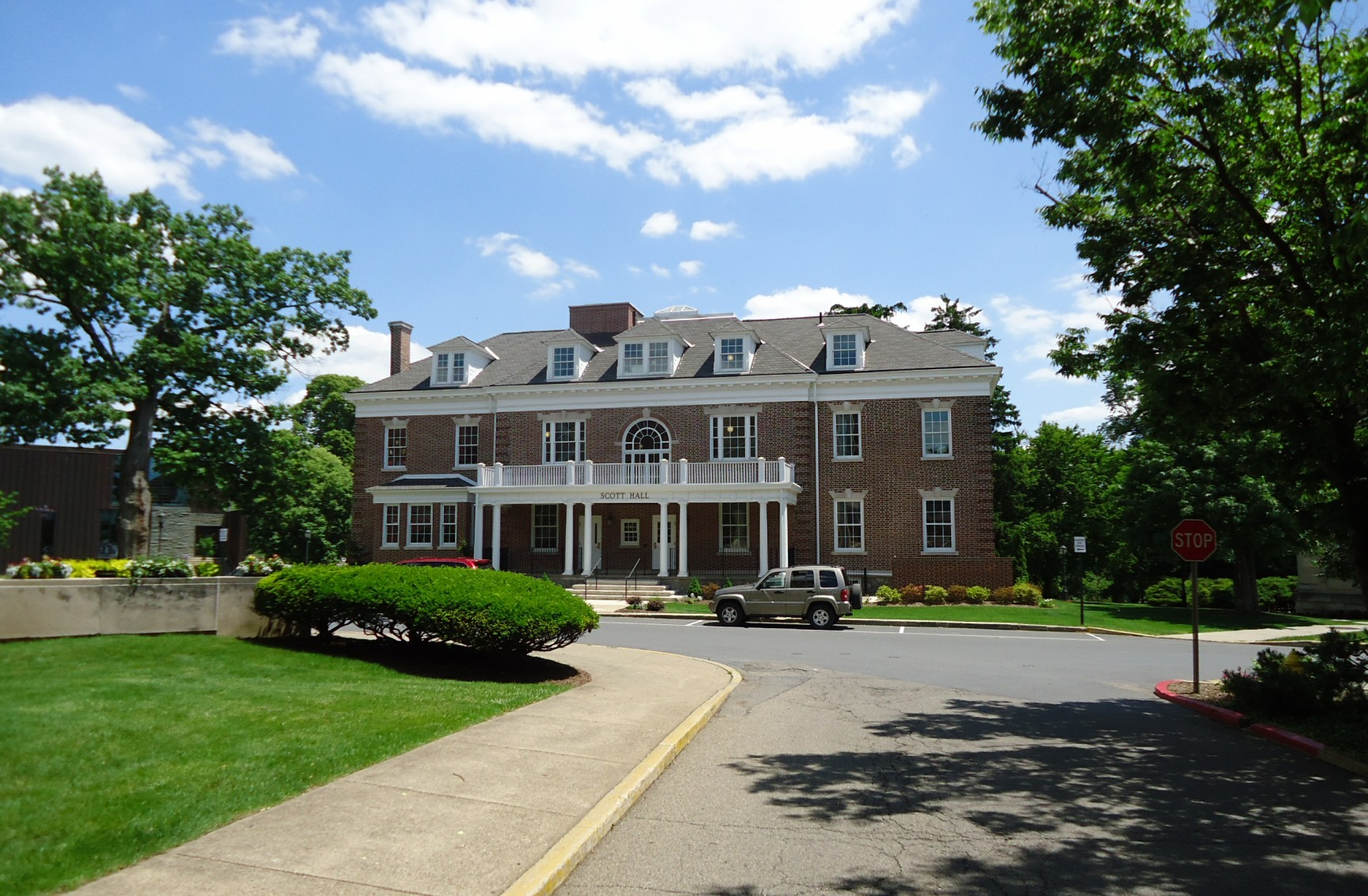
Scott Hall

Scott Hall is the location of the dean of the college, and the Center for the Integration of Teaching, Learning, and Scholarship. The building was originally the home of the Phi Delta Theta fraternity and was built in 1908 in the Georgian Revival style, though their removal from campus in 1993 left the house empty for a number of years. By 2008, the consideration was made to demolish the house due to termite damage and neglect, though the college instead opted to pursue a $3.3 million renovation through Miller, Miller & McLachlan to restore the structure. In 2011, the house was renovated while keeping its original style as a space for growing administrative offices. Miller, Miller & McLachlan later received the 2009 Excellence in Construction Award from the Associated Builders and Contractors of Eastern Pennsylvania for their restoration of this historical building.

== Residence halls ==
=== Farber Hall ===
Located on March Field, Farber Hall was constructed in 1978 as a memorial to Charles D. Farber, class of 1965, who had died in an accident in 1969. His father, Jack Farber, also a graduate of Lafayette in 1931 additionally set up a scholarship in his honor. Plans for the building were made as early as 1970, when the college realized a need for additional housing after becoming co-ed. Its architecture is similar to the adjacent Ramer Hall which was built thirteen years later.

=== Keefe Hall ===
Keefe Hall sits at the crest of the hill overlooking downtown Easton. It is a 37,800 square foot residence hall built in the Georgian style which contains multiple "special-interest housing" blocs for students.

=== Marquis Hall ===
Marquis Hall is a mixed-use building with a dining area taking up the entire first floor, an all-female residence hall on the second and third floors, and offices located in the basement. In the past, it has also been the home of the sociology and anthropology departments, and campus safety. The building was initially constructed in 1960 in Colonial Revival style, and was named for the Marquis de Lafayette.

=== South College ===
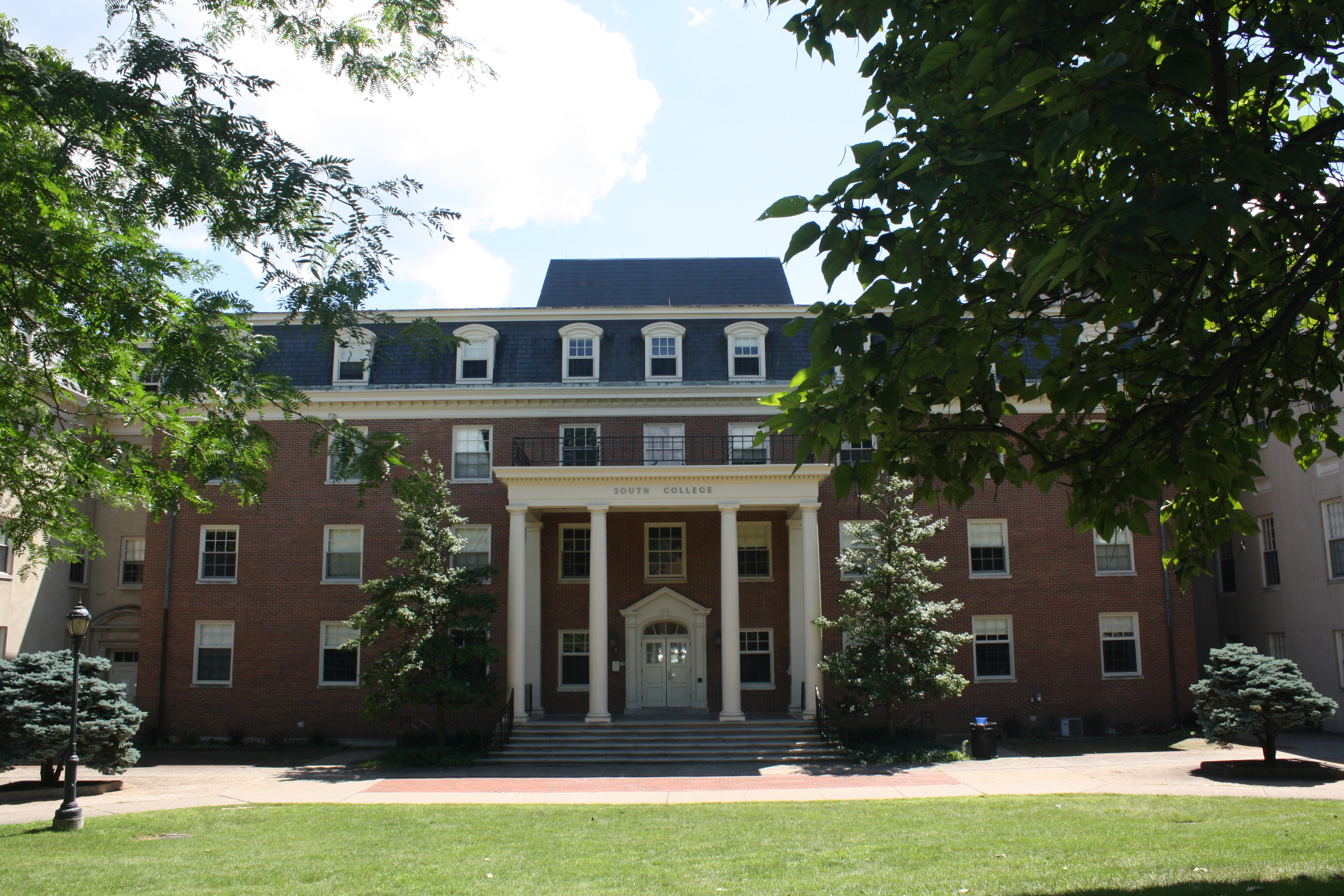
South College

South College is a residence hall for students of all years, and was the first building constructed at Lafayette College. Construction of the building started in 1833, and it was hand built by the students under the supervision and help of the college's first president, George Junkin. In its original iteration, the building consisted of only the middle edifice, and this housed a kitchen, dining hall, recitation room, prayer hall, rooms for the college's two literary societies, fifty dormitory rooms, and apartments for the college president and his family.

The first addition to the building began by the addition of the east wing completed in 1870. Built with $22,000 donated by the city of Easton, the new wing was named Eastonian Hall and contained a two-story tall room which was quickly used to house the college's growing collecting of books. A second addition, the west wing, was finished by 1873 which contained the college chapel. In 1878, the graduating class gifted to the school the clock which still sits along the steeple of South College. The following class of 1879 donated the South College Bell. With the construction of Colton Chapel in 1916, the West wing chapel was utilized as a basketball court, then underwent renovations in 1921 to separate it into two rooms; one housing a lecture hall, the other hosting the faculty room.

On March 1, 1956, after years without renovation, the trustees decided to close the east wing of South due to its dilapidation. The following night, March 2, a fire burned much of the west wing and the building's tower. Through the years 1957–8, both of these wings were completely renovated to be used as student housing. In 1961, the entire center edifice was razed and rebuilt in order to make room for more student housing, a book store, and post office. In 2001, the west wing was again renovated, and this time renamed as Jesser Hall, after Ned Jesser, class of 1939.

=== Watson Hall ===
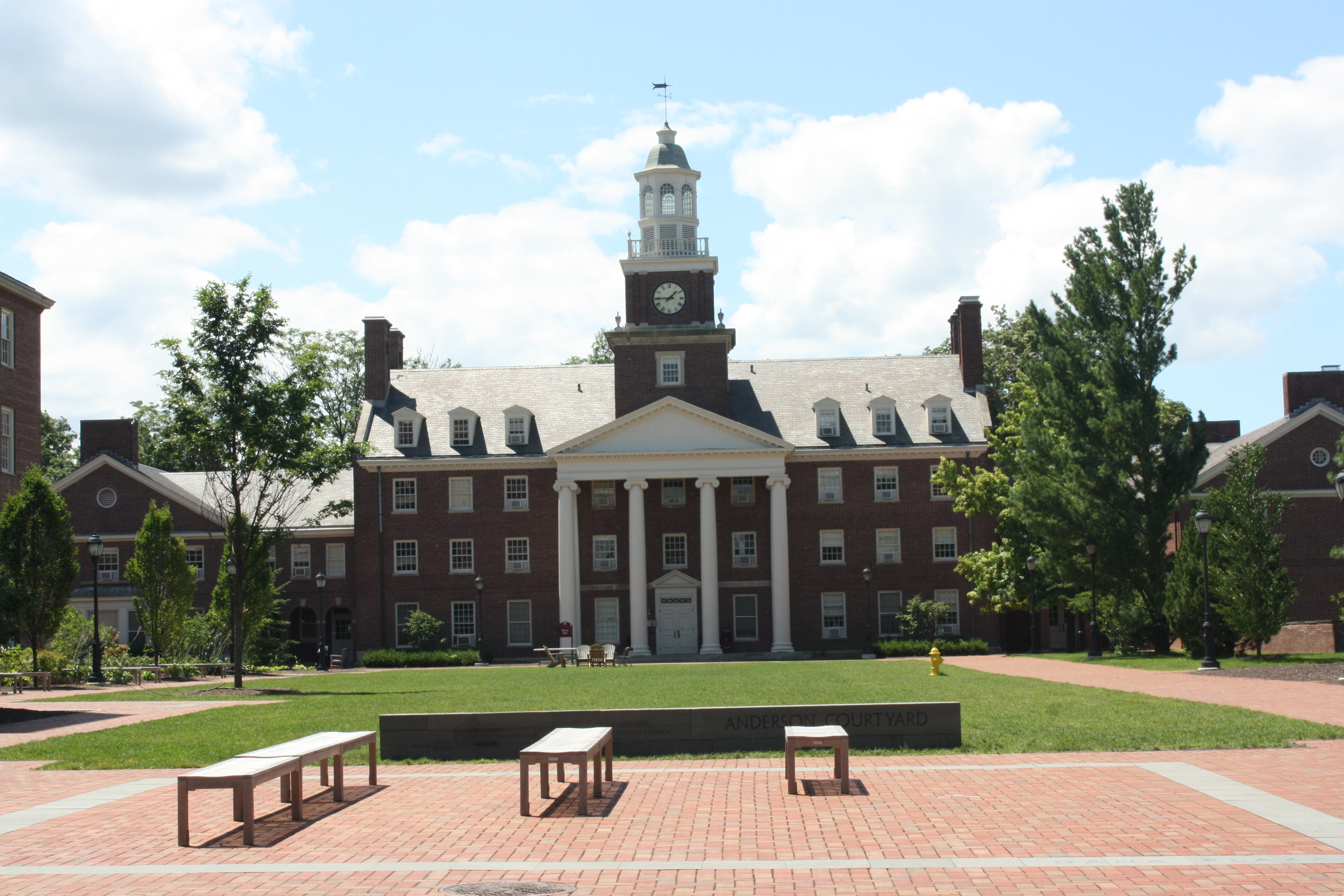
Watson Hall

Watson Hall is a residence hall, and was originally constructed in 1949 as the college's school of international affairs. It was donated by Thomas J. Watson, a prominent American businessman who was a college trustee from 1930 to 1956. In 1956 a wing was added to the north side of the building to hold additional student dorms, classrooms, and a dining facility. A second addition in 1964 added a southern wing to the building to bring architectural balance to the building and add an additional residence wing for 40 students and one faculty resident. In 1971, when the college began accepting women, Watson Hall was renovated into a women's residence. By 1973, the building became co-ed and currently exists this way.

== Greek life buildings ==
=== Delta Kappa Epsilon House ===
The first fraternity building built on campus, the DKE House, was applied for in June 1900 and was completed in 1904. Its initial placement on the campus was near the current site of Kunkel Hall. The house was rebuilt in 1962 near March Field following a house fire in 1959. In 2015, the house received an extensive remodel, with an addition of a solarium and larger front edifice.

=== Zeta Psi Fraternity House ===
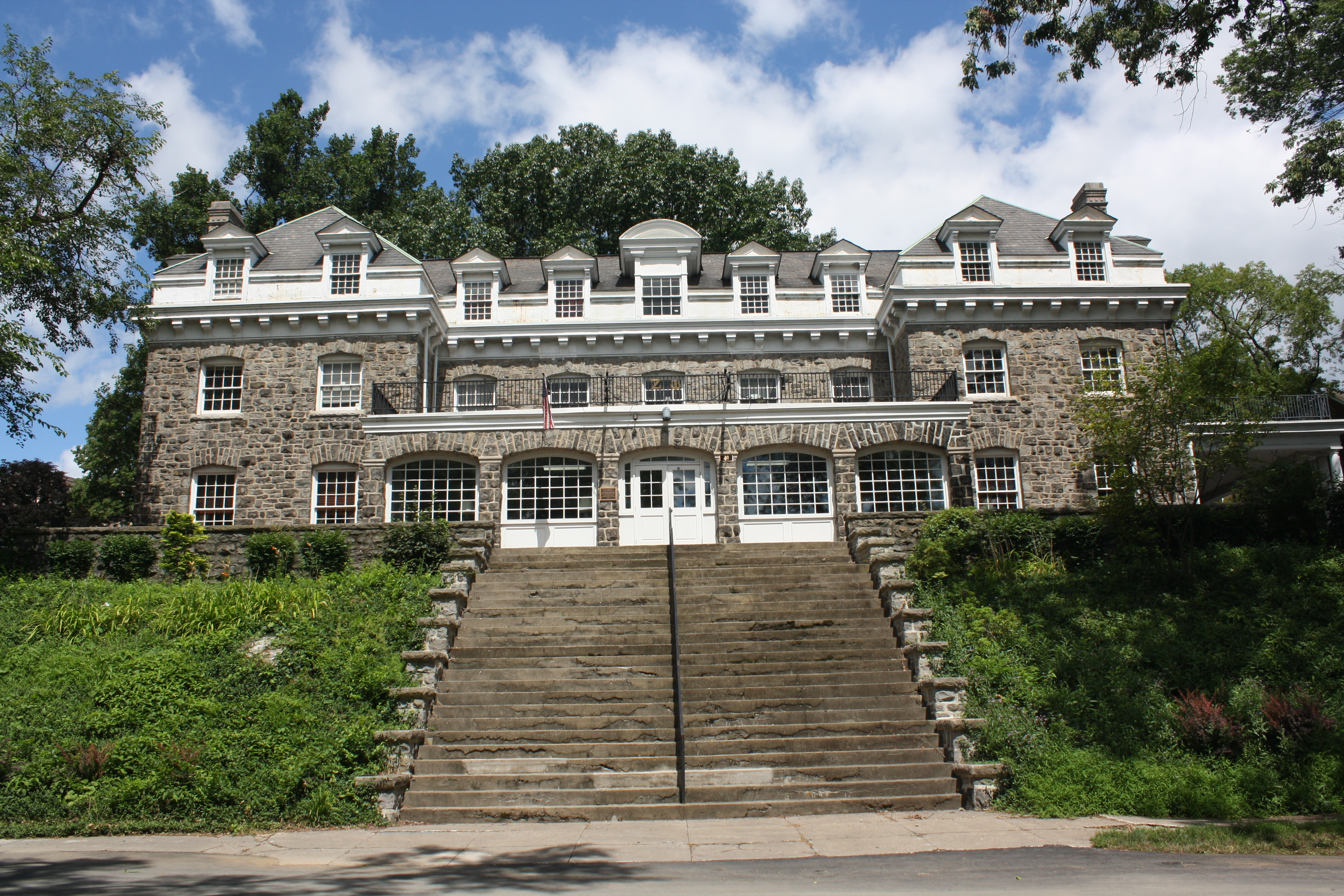
Zeta Psi House

The Zeta Psi house is an historic house, and the only building on the Lafayette College campus to be on the National Register of Historic Places, having been added in 2001. It was constructed on February 2, 1910, by the Tau chapter of Zeta Psi at the cost of $50,000. The style of the house reflects both Colonial Revival and Arts and Crafts in its design and detailing. Due to the suspension of the Zeta Psi fraternity from 2014 to 2018, the building was used as a residence hall.

== Miscellaneous buildings ==
=== Colton Chapel ===
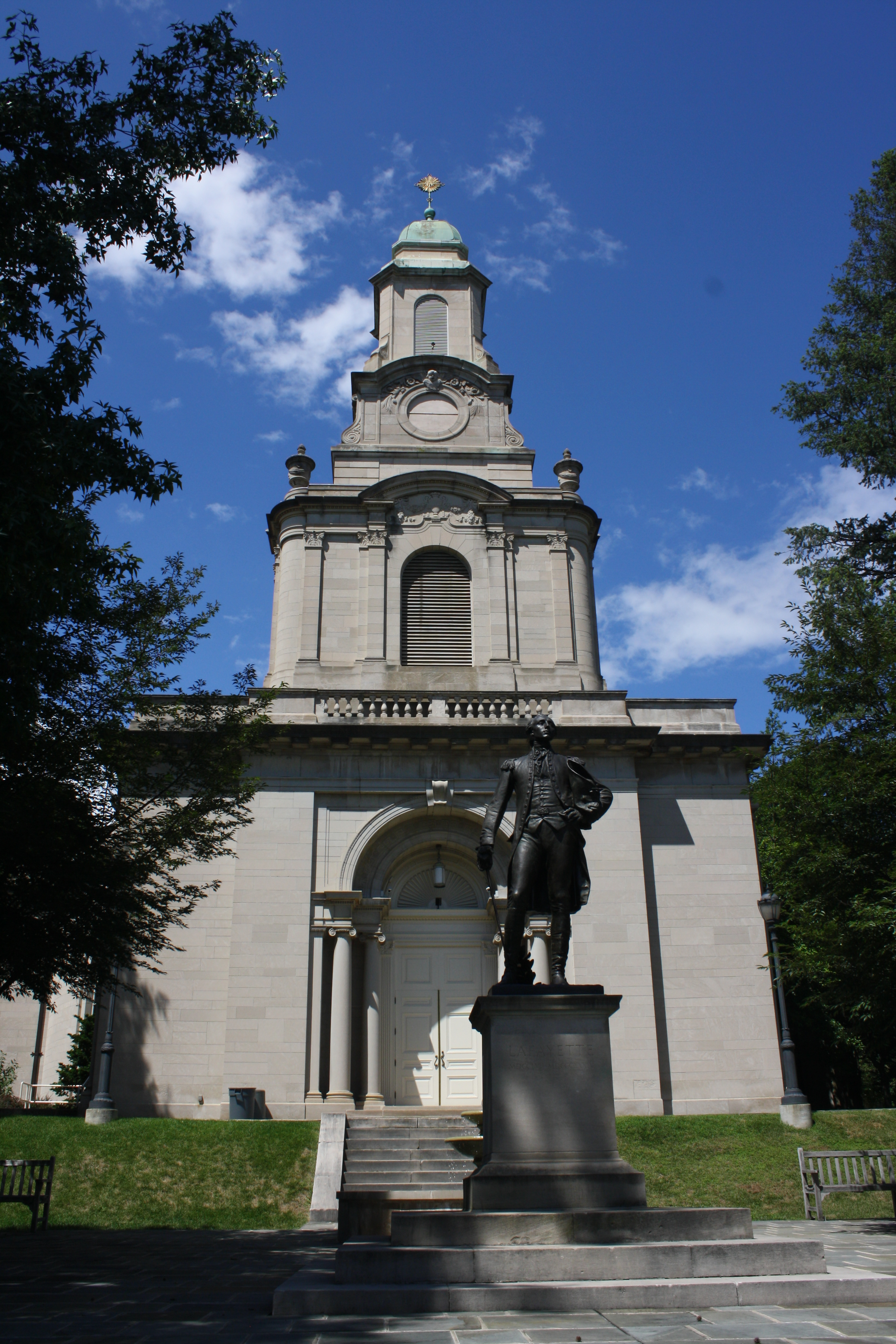
The front of Colton Chapel with the statue of the Marquis de Lafayette in the foreground

Constructed in 1916 by Carrère and Hastings, Colton Chapel is the main house of worship on campus. It was constructed in the Beaux-Arts style out of Indiana limestone and featured two Tiffany glass windows in its interior. The design of the spire is based on the work of Christopher Wren, who was instrumental in the rebuilding of 52 churches in London after the Great Fire. In 1921, the statue of the Marquis de Lafayette was dedicated on the south entrance of the chapel.

On Easter Sunday, 1965, Colton Chapel caught on fire and was completely gutted. Since the exterior of the chapel was structurally sound, the only costs incurred the renovation of the interior, although the two Tiffany glass windows were destroyed beyond repair. The chapel was rededicated on October 22, 1967, after receiving extensive upgrades to its interior, with a new organ and balcony, with seating for 800 students.

=== Farinon College Center ===
One of the most popular buildings on campus, Farinon is the college's main social center. It includes two separate dining facilities, the post office, a movie theater, meeting rooms, and offices for student and school organizations, including residence life. The main floor hosts a large atrium under a large glass skylight which is a major gathering spot for students.

Farinon was constructed by Shepley Bulfinch from 1989 to 1991 at a cost of $16 million. It was named for William B. Farinon, class of 1939, and P.T. Farinon.

=== Hogg Hall ===
Hogg Hall is home to the college's career services, religious & spiritual life offices, an interfaith chapel, and the campus radio station, WJRH. It was originally built in 1902 to house the Brainerd Evangelical Society, a group on campus named after American missionary David Brainerd, with the mission to "promote Christian Missions and the Evangelization of the World". Funding for the building, originally known as Brainerd Hall, came from James Renwick Hogg (class of 1878) who donated $35,000 for its completion. It was built in the Collegiate Gothic style out of New Quincy granite and trimmed with Indiana limestone. Gargoyles and ornamental buttresses are featured throughout the building, reminiscent of the original Gothic churches.

When it was first completed, the building functioned as a meeting area for religious services by the Brainerd Society, as well as a recreation center. It also became a student branch of the YMCA. The building contained a bowling alley, billiard tables, reading rooms, a large pipe organ, and a trophy room. In 1926, the auditorium was renovated into a Little Theater to host the campus plays. In 1944, the name was changed to Hogg Hall to honor its donor.

=== Skillman Library ===
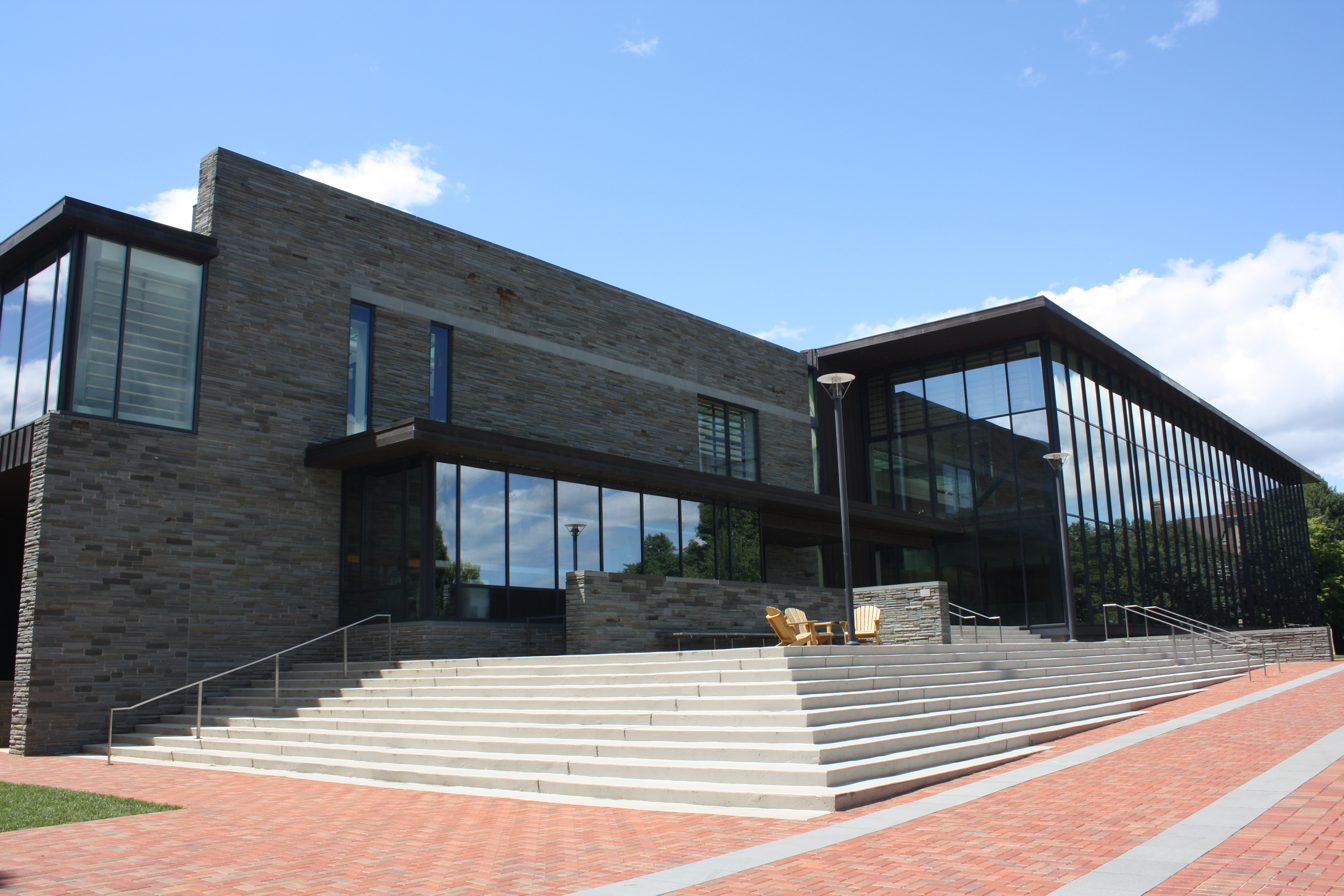
Skillman Library

The David Bishop Skillman Library is the main library on the college campus with a collection of over 600,000 volumes. It was built in 1965 to replace Van Wickle Hall as the main library after a 1956 Middle States Association survey of the college revealed the need for a more adequate library facility for a rapidly growing student population. A $2 million campaign was launched to raise money for the new library, which was subsequently named after David B. Skillman, the college's first librarian and biographer.

In 2004, the library underwent a $22 million renovation which overhauled the entire interior and exterior and added over 28,000 square feet of space. It was designed by Ann Beha Architects, (renamed Annum Architects in 2022), and upon its completion received the 2005 Boston Society of Architects’ Honor Award for Design Excellence and Higher Education Facilities Design Award, the 2006 ALA Institute Honor Award for Interior Architecture in, and the 2007 American Institute of Architects’ AIA/ALA Library Building Award.

The library also is the home of the special collections and college archives. Among those items in the collection are: General Lafayette's personal sword, a first edition copy of The Federalist Papers, and many other items authenticated as original possessions of Lafayette.

In 1979, a library assistant stole an Egyptian pectoral from the college's special archives, which had been in the college's possession since 1873. The pectoral, dated to the Second Intermediate Period of Egypt (1783–1550 B.C.) was sold in 1981 to the Boston Museum of Fine Arts for $165,000. A lawsuit against the museum was dropped in 1992 after an undisclosed settlement and transfer of title to the museum.

The Skillman Library was awarded the 2014 Excellence in Academic Libraries award by the Association of College and Research Libraries. In 2015 it was featured in the television show Parks and Recreation in its series finale.

== Athletic facilities ==
=== On campus ===
The main athletic facility on campus is the Kirby Sports Center, which hosts the men's and women's basketball programs. It also contains a pool, rock climbing wall, indoor track, and the main fitness center.

Fisher Stadium is the college's 13,132-seat multi-purpose stadium which mainly hosts the Lafayette Leopards football program. The Bourger Varsity Football House is the home of the fitness center and locker rooms for the football program and sits directly adjacent to the field.

=== Off campus ===
Lafayette also owns a 230-acre athletic complex, the Metzgar Fields Athletic Complex, located about 3 miles away from the main campus in Tatamy, Pennsylvania. It is home to most of the college's athletic programs not housed on campus.

The college baseball team practices at Kamine Stadium, Rappolt Field hosts the lacrosse teams, and soccer is held in the Mike Bourger '44 Field at Oaks Stadium.

== Non-building campus landmarks ==
- The Soldiers' Monument was the first statue erected on campus, and is located on the southern end of the campus overlooking downtown Easton. Its erection was organized by the alumni association at the 1868 commencement, though lengthy efforts to raise the necessary cost of $5,000 were not reached until 1872.
- Marquis de Lafayette is a statue by Daniel Chester French made in 1921. Originally created in plaster for the Fourth Liberty Bond Act, a copy was requested by Lafayette president John Henry MacCracken to be cast in bronze for college. It now sits in front of Colton Chapel. Its base bears the inscription of a poem that Lafayette had written to his father-in-law in 1777.
- Transcendence, a 2008 sculpture by Melvin Edwards, celebrates the life of David K. McDonogh, Lafayette's first African-American graduate, and one of the first slaves to ever receive a college degree.

== Works cited ==
- Skillman, David Bishop, The Biography of a College: Being the History of the First Century of the Life of Lafayette College Volume 1. Easton, Pennsylvania, 1932.
- Skillman, David Bishop, The Biography of a College: Being the History of the First Century of the Life of Lafayette College Volume 2. Easton, Pennsylvania, 1932.
- Gendebien, Albert W., The Biography of a College: A History of Lafayette College 1927 - 1978. Easton, Pennsylvania, 1986.
