= Loren Madsen =

American sculptor

Loren Madsen (born 1943) is an American sculptor. Madsen has been cited for his innovations in representing data through sculpture. Madsen has created a carved wood sculpture that visualized the United States government defense budget, A 1994 work titled CPI visualized changes in the consumer price index.

His work is included in the collections of the Museum of Fine Arts Houston, the Anderson Collection at Stanford University, and the Art Gallery of New South Wales. His personal papers are held in the Archives of American Art.
