= List of Kutztown University of Pennsylvania alumni =

Kutztown University of Pennsylvania is a public university in Kutztown, Pennsylvania. It was previously known as Keystone State Normal School, Kutztown State Teacher's College, and Kutztown State College. Following are some of its notable alumni.

== Art ==
Name	Class	Major	Notability	References
Bill Beckley		BFA	Conceptual artist	
Paul Frederick Berdanier	1898		Illustrator and cartoonist	
David Biedrzycki			Illustrator and writer of children's books	
Susan Daigle-Leach	1983	BFA	Comic book artist	
Vicki DaSilva	1983	BFA	Light painter and graffiti artist	
Don Everhart	1972	BFA painting	Sculptor and coin engraver-medalist for United States Mint	
Michael Kessler		BFA	Artist	
Ruth Mountaingrove			Documentary photographer, poet, and musician	
Don Reitz	1957	Art Education	Ceramic artist and teacher of ceramic art at the University of Wisconsin–Madison	
Mark Ruwedel	1978	BFA	Landscape photographer	
Karen TenEyck		Non-degreed	Scenic and graphic designer	
John N. Wenrich	1939	Art Education	Pennsylvania impressionist artist	

== Education ==
Name	Class	Major	Notability	References
John F. Annoni	1989	Elementary Education	Educator, gun rights advocate, and founder of the Camp Compass Academy	
John J. Kennedy	1984, 1988	BA and MA in Public Administration	Political scientist and professor at West Chester University	
Gary G. Lash		Geology	Geologist and professor emeritus at SUNY Fredonia	
Edwin E. Miller	1897	Bachelor of Engineering	Attorney, instructor at the John Marshall Law School, and deputy clerk of court in the Probate Court of Cuyahoga County	
Don Reitz	1957	Art Education	Ceramic artist and teacher of ceramic art at the University of Wisconsin–Madison	

== Entertainment ==
Name	Class	Major	Notability	References
Jeremy Culver	1999		Film director, screenwriter, and producer	
Joe DeRosa			Comedian and actor	
Tyler Lepley	2010	Criminal justice	Actor	
Matthew McGurk			Talent manager and music producer	
Ryat (Christina McGeehan)		Jazz studies	Musician	
Eric D. Schaeffer	1984	BFA	Theater director, and producer	
Rick Vito			Guitarist and singer, formerly with Fleetwood Mac	
Tom Warburton		Graphic design	Creator of the animated television series, Codename: Kids Next Door	
Paul R. Wieand	1940		Folklorist, Pennsylvania German playwright, and radio broadcaster	

== Government ==
Name	Class	Major	Notability	References
Don Everhart	1972	BFA painting	Coin engraver-medalist for United States Mint and sculptor	
John J. Forbes	1905	Teaching	Mining engineer and 9th director of the U.S. Bureau of Mines	

== Law and crime ==
Name	Class	Major	Notability	References
Edwin E. Miller	1897	Bachelor of Engineering	Deputy clerk of court in the Probate Court of Cuyahoga County, attorney, and instructor at the John Marshall Law School	
Brian Nichols			Criminal notable for his escape and killing spree in the Fulton County courthouse in Atlanta	
Arenda Wright Allen	1982		United States district judge on the U.S. District Court for the Eastern District of Virginia	

== Literature and journalism ==
Name	Class	Major	Notability	References
Bob Cesca			Columnist for Salon	
Shannon Delany		Secondary social studies education	Novelist	
Robert Gibb		BA	Winner of National Poetry Series Award	
Thomas J. Hylton	1970		Winner of 1990 Pulitzer Prize for Editorial Writing	
Craig Rivera		Communication and media studies	Journalist, producer and correspondent for Fox News Channel	
Mark Schultz	1977	BFA Painting	Writer and illustrator of books and comics	
Thomas John Shillea		Arts Education	Artist, who specializes in painting and photography	
Linda Grace Hoyer Updike	1918		Author and mother of John Updike	

== Politics ==
Name	Class	Major	Notability	References
Roy Afflerbach	1989	MA political science	Former mayor of Allentown, Pennsylvania	
Dave Arnold		Criminal justice	Member of the Pennsylvania Senate and district attorney of Lebanon County	
William Martin Croll			Former member of United States House of Representatives	
Thomas D. Danner			Former member of the Pennsylvania State Senate	
James Delgrosso			Mayor of Bethlehem, Pennsylvania	
Arthur Granville Dewalt			Former member of United States House of Representatives	
Robert Donchez			Former mayor of Bethlehem, Pennsylvania	
Isaac Hoffer Doutrich			Former member of United States House of Representatives	
Joe Emrick	1999	MEd Education	Member of the Pennsylvania House of Representatives	
Mark M. Gillen	2008	MEd Education	Member of the Pennsylvania House of Representatives	
Manny Guzman Jr.		Non-degreed	Member of the Pennsylvania House of Representatives	
Harry D. Kutz			Former member of the Pennsylvania State Senate	
John Linder		MEd higher education and counseling	Mayor of Chester, Pennsylvania (2012–2016)	
George S. Messersmith	1900		United States ambassador to Austria, Cuba, Mexico, and Argentina; United States assistant secretary of state	
Guy L. Moser			Former member of United States House of Representative	
Salvatore J. Panto Jr.			Mayor of Easton, Pennsylvania	
José Lorenzo Pesquera			Former resident commissioner of Puerto Rico	
Mark Rozzi	1996	Political Science	Former speaker of the Pennsylvania House of Representatives	
Wilson G. Sarig	1894		Speaker of the Pennsylvania House of Representatives	
John A. Schlegel	1977	Social Studies	Member of the Pennsylvania House of Representatives	
Gus Yatron	1950	Education	Former member of United States House of Representatives	
Peter Zug	1980	Business Administration	Former member of the Pennsylvania House of Representatives	

== Sports ==
Name	Class	Major	Notability	References
Bill DeMott			Professional wrestler	
Stephen Dennis	2010		Professional basketball player for Bnei Herzliya of the Israeli Basketball Premier League	
Doug Dennison	1973		Former professional football player with the Dallas Cowboys	
Robert DeStefano			Sports chiropractor and team doctor for the New York Giants	
Robert DiRico			Former professional football player	
John Gabriel	1978		Executive in the NBA	
Davonn Harp			Professional basketball player with the Philippine Basketball Association	
Bruce Harper	1976		Former professional football players with the New York Jets	
Harry Hoch	1905		Former Major League baseball pitcher	
Jerome Kapp	2022		College football player	
Mike Kullman	1987		Professional football player	
John Mobley	1996		Former professional football player with the Denver Broncos	
Jordan Morgan	2017		Professional football player	
A. J. Petrucci		Criminal justice	Former professional wrestler	
Andre Reed	2005		Former professional football player with the Buffalo Bills and Washington Redskins	
Craig Reynolds	2019		Professional football player	
Abraham J. Sharadin			College football coach	
Dave Steckel	1982		Head football coach at Missouri State University	
Matt Swarmer	2016		Major League Baseball pitcher	
Ryan Vogelsong			Major League and Japanese league baseball pitcher	
Terry Williams			Professional gridiron football running back	
