= George S. Smith =

American politician

Mayor George Sylvester Smith

Mayor of Easton, Pennsylvania
- In office 1960–1968
- Preceded by: Orion H. Reeves
- Succeeded by: Fred Ashton

Easton City Councilor
- In office 1975–1986

Easton City Council President
- In office 1978–1979

Personal details
- Born: January 31, 1907 Easton, Pennsylvania, U.S.
- Died: December 25, 1986 (aged 79) Allentown, Pennsylvania, U.S.
- Party: Democratic Party
- Spouse: Theresa Frace (m. 19??-1980; her death)
- Children: 4
- Education: Muhlenberg College; University of Pennsylvania
- Occupation: Physician

Military service
- Branch/service: United States Army
- Years of service: 1941–1945
- Rank: Major

George Sylvester Smith (January 31, 1907 – December 25, 1986) was an American politician who was a Democratic mayor of Easton, Pennsylvania for two terms between 1960 and 1968. He was also on the Easton City Council from 1975 until his death in 1986 at the age of 79.

== Early life ==
An Easton native, Smith was born to Bernard and Catherine "Katie" (née Tobin) Smith. He graduated from the Easton High school in 1924 and from Muhlenberg College in 1928. He later obtained a medical degree from the University of Pennsylvania.

== Career ==
=== Physician ===
Smith opened a medical practice in Easton in 1933. During World War II Smith served as a Major in the United States Army Medical Corps. He would operate his medical practice until his retirement in 1960 when he was elected mayor.

=== Mayor of Easton ===
First elected in 1960, mayor Smith was the last mayor of Easton under its weak mayor system. This meant that the office was mostly ceremonial, the mayor having no ability to vote in council meetings or participate in local government. He would go on to win re-election in 1964 and would decline to run for a third term despite there being no term limits for the office.

=== Easton City Council ===
Following his departure from the office of mayor, Smith served as director of the Bi-City Health Board for Allentown and Bethlehem from 1968 to 1974. He was elected as a city councilman in 1975. He would be re-elected in 1979 and 1983 and had plans to stand for election again in 1987. Described as "astute" and "honest", he headed the council's public works committee, was vice-chairman of the planning and development committee, and served as council president in 1978 and 1979. After a year in and out of hospital, Smith died in office in 1986 at the age of 79.

=== Legacy ===
Smith was well-liked by the other city councilors. Then-mayor Salvatore J. Panto, Jr. ordered city hall to fly its flag at half mast and have black bunting draped the front door of City Hall in mourning. Panto also described Smith as a role model of his, and someone whose experience "behind the desk" was invaluable during his early tenure as mayor. The Pennsylvania General Assembly passed an act to rename the Third Street Bridge to the Dr. George S. Smith Memorial Bridge on December 5, 1988.

== Personal life ==
A Roman Catholic, Smith married Theresa Frace, who died in 1980. He had three sons and a daughter.
