= Fred Ashton =

American politician (1931–2013)

Mayor of Easton, Pennsylvania
- In office 1968–1976
- Preceded by: George S. Smith
- Succeeded by: Henry J. Schultz

Personal details
- Born: March 7, 1931 Easton, Pennsylvania, U.S.
- Died: May 9, 2013 (aged 82) Seaside Heights, New Jersey, U.S.
- Party: Republican
- Spouse: Shirley Adams
- Education: Lafayette College; Temple University
- Profession: American politician

Fred L. Ashton, Jr. (March 7, 1931 – May 9, 2013) was an American politician who served as the mayor of Easton, Pennsylvania, from 1968 to 1976. Ashton also served as the first strong mayor of Easton, beginning with his inauguration for a second term in 1972. He was a member of the Republican Party.

== Early life and education ==
Ashton was born in Easton, Pennsylvania, on March 7, 1931, to Fred L. Ashton Sr. and Jean Melick Ashton. He graduated from Easton Area High School in 1948. He enlisted in the United States Army, which stationed him in West Germany at the time of the Korean War in the early 1950s. Ashton received a bachelor's degree from Lafayette College in Easton in 1952 and a master's degree from Temple University in Philadelphia in 1955. Originally a licensed funeral director by profession, Ashton worked for the Schuylkill Haven Casket Company. He co-owned the Ashton Funeral Home with his brother, R. Kline Ashton, until 1970.

== Career ==
Fred L. Ashton Jr. was elected to the Easton city council from 1963 to 1967. He was elected mayor of Easton as a Republican in 1967 and took office in 1968, succeeding outgoing Mayor George S. Smith. He won re-election for a second term in 1971, becoming Easton's first strong mayor. As mayor, Ashton oversaw the construction of the city's new parking garage, which also houses the Easton Police Department, and a new fire station in the city's College Hill Residential Historic District. Larry Holmes Drive, a portion of Pennsylvania Route 611, was completed in downtown Easton during his tenure. More controversially, Ashton supported the Riverside Drive and Lehigh-Washington Street urban renewal projects covering a sizable area of downtown between Front (now Larry Holmes Drive) and Fifth streets and from Ferry to Washington streets, displacing a large number of businesses operated by the Lebanese American and Syrian American communities. Numerous historic buildings, including older colonial and pre-revolutionary structures were demolished and replaced by a fast food restaurant, movie theater, hotel, and gas station, which were constructed on the site. Years later, during a 1987 mayoral election campaign, Ashton defended his decision to tear down the historic buildings, arguing that the neighborhood had been blighted and, in his opinion, could not have been restored.

Ashton lost his bid for a third term in November 1975 and left office in January 1976. He was succeeded by Mayor Henry J. Schultz. He ran again for mayor in 1983, but lost that election. (Incumbent Republican Mayor Phil Mitman won re-election). Ashton announced his candidacy for mayor again in 1987, but dropped out of the race due to a conflict with his business schedule. In total, Fred Ashton ran for mayor during five different elections: 1967, 1971, 1975, 1985, and 1988.

Ashton lived in Seaside Heights, New Jersey, after leaving local politics. He and his wife were licensed brokers at Crossroads Realty in Lavallette, New Jersey, before his retirement.

== Death ==
Ashton lived with his sister after Hurricane Sandy damaged his Seaside Heights home in October 2012. Ashton died at his sister's residence, in the Easton, Pennsylvania area, on May 9, 2013, at the age of 82. He was survived by his wife of 60 years, the former Shirley Adams; five children, and fourteen grandchildren. Ashton was buried in Easton Cemetery in Easton.
