= Samuel S. Horn =

American politician

Mayor Samuel S. Horn

Mayor of Easton, Pennsylvania
- In office 1920–1924
- Preceded by: David W. Nevin
- Succeeded by: Wesley M. Heiberger
- In office 1927–1929
- Preceded by: Wesley M. Heiberger
- Succeeded by: ????

Member of the Pennsylvania House of Representatives
- In office 1924 – December 31, 1927

Easton controller
- In office 1912–1919

Personal details
- Born: June 22, 1870 Easton, Pennsylvania, US
- Died: March 11, 1942 (aged 71) Easton, Pennsylvania, US
- Party: Republican
- Spouse: Laura Mount Horn

Samuel S. Horn (1870-1942) was an American politician from Easton, Pennsylvania, who was elected mayor on two occasions. He was also elected to two terms in the Pennsylvania House of Representatives; however, he resigned during his second in order to return to being mayor.

== Early life ==
Horn was an Easton native born on June 22, 1870. His family has deep roots in Easton, running the "Merchant's House" hotel, which occupied one of the city's original Moravian buildings. He worked for his father's general store and a local hardware company before getting involved in local politics.

== Political career ==
A Republican, Horn was elected the controller of Easton in 1912 and served in that office until 1919. In 1919 he was elected mayor of Easton and served a four-year term from 1920 to 1924. In 1924 he was elected to the Pennsylvania House of Representatives and was re-elected to a second term in 1926. However, he resigned from the House in order to return to being mayor of Easton on December 31, 1927. His second term as mayor of Easton ended in 1929.

== Personal life ==
Horn was married to Laura Mount Horn. Horn died in Easton on March 11, 1942, at the age of 71 and is buried in the Easton Heights Cemetery.
