= David W. Nevin =

American politician

Mayor David W. Nevin
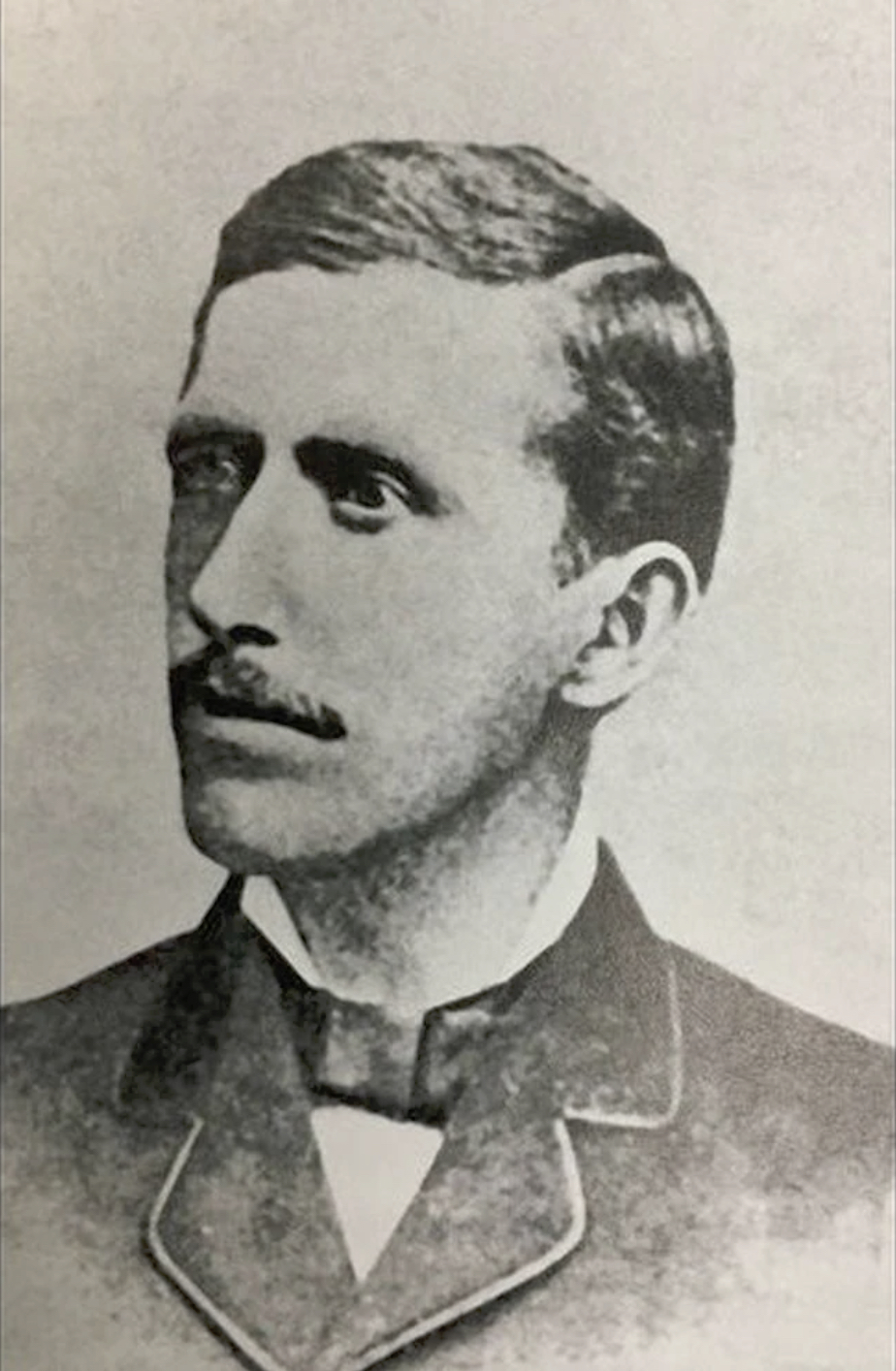

Mayor of Easton, Pennsylvania
- In office December 4, 1911 – 1920
- Preceded by: Henry McKeen
- Succeeded by: Samuel S. Horn

President of the Easton City Council
- In office 1888–1888

Easton City Councillor
- In office 1886–1911

Personal details
- Born: September 9, 1853 Shippensburg, Pennsylvania, US
- Died: March 31, 1945 (aged 91) Easton, Pennsylvania, US
- Party: Republican
- Children: Samuel W. Nevin; D. Burrowes Nevin; John D. Nevin
- Relatives: Major David Robert Bruce Nevin (uncle)
- Education: Lafayette College
- Occupation: lawyer developer

David Williamson Nevin (1853–1945) was an American politician from Easton, Pennsylvania, who served as the city's mayor and is considered to be "Easton's greatest citizen".

== Early life ==
Nevin was born on September 9, 1853, in Shippensburg, Pennsylvania. When he was 10 years old his father took him to Gettysburg where he heard the Gettysburg Address. His uncle, David Robert Bruce Nevin was a major in the Union Army and later an attorney from Philadelphia. Nevin went to study law at Lafayette College however, while he was studying he was nearly killed by tuberculosis in 1872. This near death experience played a key role in the remainder of Nevin's life as he would be described as full of energy, boundless, and never took anything for granted.

== Career ==
=== Early legal career ===
Following his belated graduation in 1875 Nevin worked for a city attorney for two years before passing the Northampton County bar and opening his own law firm in 1877. That year he would also run for Northampton County district attorney, but would lose the election.

=== Real estate development ===
In 1887, Nevin's "butter and egg man" a local farmer named John Mann, who delivered produce to Nevin every Friday afternoon, was asked if he would be willing to sell his farm to Nevin on behalf of his uncle from Philadelphia, D.R.B. Nevin. Mann agreed citing the rising taxes which were threatening to put him out of business. Shortly after the sale was closed the Lafayette Traction Company, of which David was a principle shareholder, built the first electric trolley line up College hill in 1888. This came despite resistance from the city's influential Republicans who sought to preserve the rural nature of the area. Shortly after Nevin constructed an inn on Mann's former property on the summit of Weygadt Mountain named the Paxinosa Inn at the price of $100,000 in 1889 (roughly $34,500,000 in 2023). The inn was named after Chief Paxinosa of the Shawnee Indians who was pivotal in the ratification of the 1757 Indian treaty. Shortly after in 1890 Nevin began developing the area around his inn into luxury villas and a neighborhood known as "Paxinosa Heights", the district is still intact today but is now known as "College Point". As part of the development and due to his stature as a devout Presbyterian he financed the construction of the College Hill Presbyterian Church and helped oversee its library. There he would develop a patent for a library record system. The Paxinosa Inn was never profitable and Nevin was forced to sell it at auction in 1896. Shortly thereafter it burned down in a fire. It was rebuilt in 1905 with fireproofed bricks, but would burn down a second time shortly after. It was never rebuilt. The cause of the inn's destruction is credited to it being 600 ft above the Delaware River preventing firefighters from having a steady stream of water due to poor infrastructure and pumps at the time. Nevin designed and donated two parks to the City of Easton. One of which, Nevin Park, hosted the city's original fountain from Easton's center square in 1899 after the erection of the soldier's monument that stands there today. The fountain would be melted down as part of a scrap metal drive for World War II. Despite his real estate business taking a turn for the worse, Nevin became the director of the Easton National Bank and to serve as the secretary and treasurer of the Easton Suspension Bridge Company.

=== Political career ===
Nevin never stopped showing an interest in local politics after his 1877 district attorney defeat. Ever since his encounter with Abraham Lincoln at the age of 10 he had been a lifelong progressive Lincolnite Republican. He would hold a series of roles in the city government before being elected as a city councilor for the second and third ward. By 1888 he was the council president and he motioned for the creation of the Easton Industrial Association to help bring industrial jobs to the city. Nevin would be elected mayor in 1911 and take office in 1912 serving two terms until 1920. Nevin is best remembered for his tough on crime platform. Easton, at the time, was a resort town for people from New York City and other cities to go and commit vices they otherwise wouldn't be able to, the largest of which was prostitution. Nevin would make it his top priority to shut down the city's 27 brothels in a manner that wouldn't be embarrassing to the women working in them. During his time as mayor he also worked to expand the city's fire and police departments. Additionally, in 1913 the city abolished the "select and common councils" for a new city commission government. The old system had 36 members elected to a "common" council that would represent the 25,000 residents of the city, while the "select" council was appointed by the mayor. This system was heavily criticized due to having the unelected select council having almost all the power, and with there being too many members of the common council resulting in endless political infighting.

Nevin died at his home in Easton on March 31, 1945.

== Legacy ==
Nevin Park still bears the mayor's name, and in 2014 a $200,000 replica of the city's original iron fountain was restored to the park. Near the end of his second term, local historian William Jacob Heller wrote that Nevin had contributed to Easton's development "perhaps more than any living man." Nevin was married and had three sons, Samuel W. Nevin, D. Burrowes Nevin and John D. Nevin. His father was an Elder of the College Point Presbyterian church. Due to Nevin's long life he would often talk about his trip to Gettysburg when he was 10 years old and lamented that: "I wish I had extended my hand, for if the president had taken one step toward me we could have shaken hands."
