= Henry J. Schultz =

American politician

Mayor Henry J. Schultz

Mayor of Easton
- In office 1976–1980
- Preceded by: Fred Ashton
- Succeeded by: Phil Mitman

Easton City Councilor
- In office 1965–1976

Personal details
- Born: January 8, 1910
- Died: June 17, 2008 (aged 98)
- Party: Democratic
- Education: Carnegie Mellon University
- Occupation: Mayor

Military service
- Branch/service: United States Navy
- Years of service: 1941–1945
- Rank: First Lieutenant

Henry J. Schultz was an American politician who served as mayor of Easton, Pennsylvania from 1976 to 1980.

== Early life ==
Schultz was born on January 8, 1910, in Easton, Pennsylvania. His Father, Henry C. Schultz, was the city's former Postmaster from 1934 to 1954. He attended Easton High School, graduating in 1927. He attended Lafayette College, but graduated from Carnegie Mellon University as part of their class of 1932 with a Bachelor of Science in building construction. He worked for his fathers roofing and sheet metal company until the start of World War II when he volunteered for the Navy. He took part in the Battle of Iwo Jima and the allied occupation of Shanghai.

== Political career ==
=== Easton councilor and mayor ===
Schultz's political career started when he was elected to Easton's first Charter Study Commission. At the same time he served on the City of Easton Authority by appointment of Mayor George Smith. He was elected to Easton City Council in November 1965, winning re-election in 1969 and 1973, serving as president of the council from 1974 to 1976. In 1976 he would defeat incumbent two term mayor Fred Ashton and serve a four-year term, before being stunningly defeated during his re-election by Republican Phil Mitman. This is still considered to be one of the most shocking upsets in Lehigh Valley political history.

=== Post-mayoral career ===
Following his defeat in the 1980 mayoral campaign he remained a local small business advocate as he was before getting into politics. He also served 20 years as a tipstaff for Northampton County President Judge Robert A. Freedberg, retiring in 2001.

== Personal life ==
In college he joined Phi Kappa Theta and would be a lifetime member. He was also a member of the Veterans of Foreign Wars and the Knights of Columbus. He married H. Josephine Schmid on October 27, 1934, and had two children; a son John and a daughter Ann Marie. He died peacefully in his sleep June 17, 2008, aged 98. He is buried in St. Joseph Cemetery.
