= Thomas F. Goldsmith =

American politician

The Honorable Thomas Fredric Goldsmith

Pennsylvania Liquor Control Board Member
- In office April 29, 2003 – October 31, 2011
- Preceded by: P.J. Stapleton
- Succeeded by: P.J. Stapleton

Mayor of Easton, Pennsylvania
- In office 1993 – April 29, 2003
- Preceded by: Salvatore J. Panto, Jr.
- Succeeded by: Michael McFadden

Easton City Councilor
- In office 1968–1988

Personal details
- Born: August 28, 1939 Easton, Pennsylvania, U.S.
- Died: January 11, 2020 (aged 80) Palmer Township, Pennsylvania, U.S.
- Party: Republican Party
- Spouse: Joann Née Doria
- Education: Lafayette College

Thomas Fredric Goldsmith was an American politician who served as Republican mayor of Easton, Pennsylvania from 1993 until his resignation in 2003 to serve on the Pennsylvania Liquor Control Board until 2011.

== Early life and education ==
Goldsmith was an Easton, Pennsylvania native, and was born on August 28, 1939, to Mary Louise Née Miles and Francis Goldsmith. He graduated from Blair Academy in 1957 and Lafayette College in 1963. In college, he joined the Young Republicans club of Easton. He also served in the New Jersey Army National Guard. He worked as a banker for the First Valley Bank, a stockbroker for W. E. Hutton & Co., and was a consultant for the Easton Area Sewer Authority.

== Career ==
=== Easton City Council ===
Since his time as a consultant for the sewer board, Goldsmith was a perennial candidate for offices around Easton. He first got elected to the Easton city council in 1968, an office he would hold until 1988. Following his departure from office he would continue to run consistently as a perennial candidate.

=== Mayor of Easton ===
Goldsmith served three terms as mayor of Easton from 1992 to 2003. Initially dismissed as just a perennial candidate, Goldsmith shockingly defeated Republican challengers to go on and upset incumbent mayor Salvatore J. Panto, Jr. in what is regarded as one of the largest upsets in Lehigh Valley political history.

During his first re-election campaign in 1995, Goldsmith raised $33,503 and was endorsed by business, trade and professional associations not only across the Lehigh Valley but also across the state of Pennsylvania. This allowed him to easily defeat his Democratic challenger Carol Weaver, who raised just $3,325 and received only one endorsement from the Construction and General Laborer's Union, Local 1174.

The election was notable for the claims that Democratic candidates for mayor and city council made that their Republican counterparts made fictitious claims about their policies and stances.

In 1997, he received an honorary degree from Lafayette College, his alma mater.

Following his second term as mayor, Goldsmith reported a $2 million city budget surplus, 400 new jobs and 94 new businesses allowing him to easily win re-election for a third term in 1999. He focuses his third term on the expansion of the Police and Fire departments, and a revitalization of the downtown including renovations of several buildings.

However, during his third term, in 2002, he was sued by a city employee, Stuart Gallaher, the Assistant Business Administrator on the claim that he had been fired due to disagreeing with the mayor on a political issue.

=== Pennsylvania Liquor Control Board ===
Goldsmith stepped down as mayor of Easton on April 29, 2003, to become a board member for the Pennsylvania Liquor Control Board following his appointment by Democratic governor Ed Rendell. He served in that role until the end of Rendell's term on October 31, 2011.

== Personal life ==
Goldsmith married Joann Doria who predeceased him in 2017. He was a lifelong member of the Presbyterian Church.

== Death ==
Thomas Goldsmith died in Palmer Township, Pennsylvania on January 11, 2020, at the age of 80.
