= List of mayors of Easton, Pennsylvania =

The Mayor of Easton, Pennsylvania is a political position dating from 1887, arising from the ascension of the Borough of Easton into the city of Easton. In 1972 the city adopted a strong mayor government, and in 2007 the people of Easton voted to give the mayor a seat on the city council.

== Mayors of Easton ==
Mayor	Term begins	Term ends	Affiliation	Notes	Ref
Charles F. Chidsey	April 4, 1887	1890	Republican	Former Union soldier and borough councilor, active in state Republican politics, representative in the Pennsylvania House of Representatives, elected city commissioner in 1913.	
William Beidelman	1890	1894	Democrat	Former Union soldier, active in state Democrat politics, served in Pennsylvania State Senate from 1878 to 1882, was solicitor of Easton (borough) from 1885 to 1887.	
Benjamin Rush Field	1894	1896	Democrat	First of his two non-consecutive terms. A Shakespearian scholar and bon vivant. He ordered and oversaw the creation of the "Easton City Guard" as a volunteer force in the Spanish–American War of which he was elected its major.	
Howard Hartzell	1896	1900	Republican	Local confectionery and early pioneer in ice cream. Later elected to the Easton city council. Congratulated by the Pennsylvania House of Representatives for 50 years of service to the Republican party.	
Benjamin Rush Field	1900	1902	Democrat	Second of his two non-consecutive terms. He would retire in 1902 to pursue personal ventures. He would go on to be one of the first elected city commissioners in 1914 as director of Public safety and proposed outlawing Christmas trees over safety concerns.	
Horace Lehr	1903	1906	Democrat	Local businessmen, member of the Easton board of trade. Elected mayor at the age of 33 and served one term. Went on to be elected board of trade president in 1914 and named postmaster of Easton in 1916	
Francis March	1906	1908	Republican	Noted polymath, academic, philologist, lexicographer, and professor at Lafayette College for 56 years who is considered the principal founder of modern comparative linguistics in Old English	
Henry McKeen	1908	1911	Democrat	Businessman active in social affairs.	
David W. Nevin	December 4, 1911	1920	Republican	Replaced the old "Select and Common" councils municipal government with a commission system in 1913. Renown for shutting down the 27 'bawdy houses' in the city and dozens of speakeasies.	
Samuel S. Horn	1920	1924	Republican	Former Controller of Easton from 1912 to 1919. Elected to the Pennsylvania House of Representatives from 1924 to 1927.	
Wesley M. Heiberger	1924	1927	Democrat	Prominent local businessman, President of the Easton board of trade in 1920. Was an elector for Pennsylvania in 1916 and a Four Minute Man.	
Samuel S. Horn	1927	1929	Republican	Resigned from the Pennsylvania House in 1927 and became mayor again until 1929	
Frederick C. Roberts	1933	1936	Republican	Local surgeon and leader of the Jewish community, frequently spoke in favor of U.S. entry into World War II after leaving office.	
Joseph Morrison	1936	1953	Democrat	Led the city through WWII. Lit the first Peace Candle on December 21, 1951.	
Robert W. Morse	1953	1955	Democrat	Dartmouth College graduate, World War II veteran, named Easton's Young Man of the year in 1951. Elected to a single term, worked for the Union Camp Corporation for 20 years.	
Orion H. Reeves	1955	1960	Republican	Defeated during re-election to Smith. Founded the Easton Emergency Squad after Hurricane Diane.	
George S. Smith	1960	1968	Democrat	A physician and World War II veteran. Served two terms as mayor and then served on the city council until his death in 1986.	
Fred Ashton	1968	1976	Republican	Former City Councilmen, became the first mayor under the Strong Mayor system of government. Infamous for his Urban Renewal program which demolished the historic Lebanese American and Syrian American quarter of the city to make way for fast food chains and gas stations.	
Henry J. Schultz	1976	1980	Democrat	Former city councilmen, lost his re-election campaign in one of the biggest upsets in Lehigh Valley political history.	
Phil Mitman	1980	1984	Republican	First of his two non-consecutive terms.	
Salvatore J. Panto, Jr.	1984	1992	Democrat	The first two of his six non-consecutive terms. At the time he was 31 and the youngest mayor in Easton's history.	
Thomas F. Goldsmith	1993	April 29, 2003	Republican	A long time Republican Perennial candidate, Goldsmith narrowly defeated incumbent mayor Sal Panto Jr in a shocking upset. He would resign as mayor before end of his term when he was appointed to the state liquor control board by governor Ed Rendell.	
Michael McFadden	May 14, 2003	January 5, 2004	Democrat	Goldsmith's business administrator. Switched parties and was appointed as acting mayor by the Democratic city council to serve out the rest of Goldsmith's term.	
Phil Mitman	January 5, 2004	January 2, 2008	Republican	Had retired from politics for 20 years before returning to the mayoral office. In 2007 the city voted to replace the strong-mayor municipal government with a mayor-on-council government.	
Salvatore J. Panto, Jr.	January 2, 2008	Current	Democrat	Currently serving his fifth consecutive, and seventh non-consecutive term.	
