= 1912 Connecticut Aggies football team =

American college football season

1912 Connecticut Aggies football
- Conference: Athletic League of New England State Colleges
- Record: 3–3 (0–0 New England)
- Head coach: Abraham J. Sharadin (1st season)
- Home stadium: Athletic Fields

The 1912 Connecticut Aggies football team represented Connecticut Agricultural College, now the University of Connecticut, in the 1912 college football season. The Aggies were led by first-year head coach Abraham J. Sharadin, and completed the season with a record of 3–3.

== Schedule ==
Date	Opponent	Site	Result
October 5	Norwich Free Academy*	Athletic Fields; Storrs, CT	W 26–0
October 12	Rockville Ind.*	Athletic Fields; Storrs, CT	W 3–0
October 19	at Worcester Academy*	Worcester, MA	L 0–40
October 26	at Williston*	Easthampton, MA	L 0–19
November 2	Fort Wright*	Athletic Fields; Storrs, CT	W 12–7
November 16	Boston College*	Athletic Fields; Storrs, CT	L 0–13
*Non-conference game
