= Matthew McGurk =

- Born: Matthew McGurk; June 6, 1980 (age 46)
- Origin: Philadelphia, PA
- Genres: Pop; Hip Hop; R&B
- Occupations: Talent Manager; Producer; Artist
- Years active: 2002 – Present
- Label: PrimeTime Productions

Matthew McGurk (born June 6, 1980) is an American talent manager, music producer, and artist. He is known for the initial discovery of artists such as Asher Roth (Def Jam Records), Jay Watts (Republic Records), Maria K (Stereotypes/Sony Music) and Keshia “KING” Peterson (Polow Da Don/Zone 4).

== Early life and education ==
McGurk was born and raised in Bucks County, Pennsylvania, just north of Philadelphia. He attended Notre Dame High School in Lawrenceville, New Jersey, received his undergraduate from Kutztown University, and his master's degree from St. Joseph's University. His first real love for music began in 1986, when at the age of six he took his sisters Beastie Boys “Licensed to Ill” tape and listened to it repeatedly. He emulated their style and started to rap as a hobby, which later became his passion and launched his career in music.

== Career ==
After graduating college in 2002, McGurk moved from Philadelphia to New Orleans accepting a job offer as a talent scout for Trans Continental Records, a Lou Pearlman company. After about a year of working in New Orleans, he realized his special talents for discovering and developing artists and moved back to Philadelphia. In 2003, he discovered and managed, hip-hop artist Asher Roth, who would later go on to sell over 2 million records of his hit single, “I love college”. Asher Roth released 2 albums while under McGurk. His first E.P. called “Just Listen”, and a mix tape called “Believe The Hype”. With the success of Asher Roth, McGurk became only the third person in music history to have discovered a solo white rapper who sold a million or more records of their debut hit single, succeeding Dr. Dre and Eminem. McGurk and Roth later decided to go their separate ways and end their business relationship. Asher Roth went on to sign with talent manager Scooter Braun, who also manages Justin Bieber.

McGurk then went on to discover and produce a pop girl group. After two years of recording and development, he decided to dismantle the group in support of their individual pursuits for solo careers. This led to major record deals for 2 out of the 3 girls. Around this time, McGurk worked with and was mentored by producer Vidal Davis.

In 2009, McGurk decided to take a break from music and became a United States Army Officer. He earned the rank of 1LT and served as an Infantry Platoon Leader in the 172nd Infantry Brigade. During this time he led a platoon mostly compiled of Army Rangers and was the officer in charge of the Battalion and Company Intelligence Support teams. After being injured in the line of duty, he was retired from active duty in 2013. McGurk was awarded the Army Meritorious Service Medal and 3 Army Commendation Medals for his service.

After his retirement from the Army, McGurk moved to Los Angeles. In 2014, his team consisting of Markus Schulz and Daniel Kier, co-wrote seven records with Meghan Trainor.
