= Phil Mitman =

Mayor of Easton, Pennsylvania
- In office January 5, 2004 – January 2, 2008
- Preceded by: Michael McFadden
- Succeeded by: Salvatore J. Panto, Jr.

Mayor of Easton, Pennsylvania
- In office 1980–1984
- Preceded by: Henry J. Schultz
- Succeeded by: Salvatore J. Panto, Jr.

Personal details
- Party: 1980-2016 Republican; 2016-Present Democratic

Phil Mitman is an American politician and former Mayor of Easton, Pennsylvania. Mitman served as the mayor of Easton for two, nonconsecutive four-year terms: His first term lasted from 1980 to 1984. Mitman was once again elected Mayor of Easton in November 2003 after being out of active politics for nearly twenty years. He served from January 2004 to January 2008. Mitman was a member of the Republican Party. However, he became a member of the Democratic Party shortly after the election of Donald Trump.

Mitman first served as Mayor from 1980 to 1984, having been elected in 1979. He decided not to seek re-election in the 1983 mayoral election to spend more time with his children. Mitman was succeeded by Democrat Sal Panto Jr.

In 2003, Mitman re-entered politics and announced his candidacy for mayor. Mitman narrowly defeated his opponent, Democratic city councilman Dan Corpora, by just 54 votes to win the November 2003 mayoral contest. He served one four-year term.

Mitman announced that he would not seek re-election to a second consecutive in a press conference held on January 23, 2007, at Easton City Hall. Mitman said he was leaving office to "seek new challenges and new opportunities" telling reporters and city officials, "It was a difficult decision on one hand, and yet I know I want other challenges now in my life—that's what drives me...I know I need to be helping Easton in the best way I can. I trust that something like that may work out. Once again, Mitman was succeeded by Sal Panto Jr., who took office on January 2, 2008.
