= Paul Frederick Berdanier =

American illustrator and cartoonist

Paul Frederick Berdanier (1879–1961) was an American illustrator and cartoonist whose work is represented in the National Gallery of Art, the Smithsonian Institution, and the Metropolitan Museum of Art.

== Early life and education ==
Berdanier was born on March 7, 1879, in Frackville, Pennsylvania. His father was Anthony, and mother, Henrietta (Zerby) Berdanier. He attended the Keystone State Normal School in Kutztown, Pennsylvania, graduating in 1898. He studied art at the Charles Hope Provost School of Illustrating and the St. Louis School of Fine Arts at Washington University, where he learned with Gustave Wolff.

== Career ==
He was an illustrator for the Post Dispatch in Saint Louis, Missouri from 1902 until 1918. During the summer of 1923 he taught a vocational class at Washington University. He was a United Features Syndicate cartoonist until 1957, when he retired.

== Recognition and memberships ==
Berdanier was listed as a notable artist by the Marquis Who's Who. He was a member of the Hudson Valley Art Association, Academic Artists Association, Allied Artists American, Chicago Society Etchers, Art League Long Island, New Jersey Painters and Sculptors Society. and the Society of American Graphic Artists.
