= Abraham J. Sharadin =

20th-century American sportsperson and coach

Biographical details
- Born: January 21, 1886
- Died: 1964 (aged 77–78)
- Education: Bloomsburg Normal (1911)

Playing career

Basketball
- 1906–1907: Kutztown

Baseball
- 1915: Chambersburg Maroons

Coaching career (HC unless noted)

Football
- 1912: Connecticut
- 1913–1914: California (PA)
- 1920: Defiance
- 1921–1922: Cumberland Valley State Normal
- 1923–1931: Ford City HS (PA)

Basketball
- 1920–1921: Defiance
- 1923–1931: Ford City HS (PA)

Baseball
- 1922–1923: Shippensburg

Head coaching record
- Overall: 16–11–1 (college football); 8–10 (college basketball)

Abraham Jacob Sharadin (January 21, 1886 – 1964) was an American football, basketball and baseball player and coach. He served as the head football coach at the University of Connecticut in 1912, at Defiance College in Defiance, Ohio in 1920, and Cumberland Valley State Normal School—now known as Shippensburg University of Pennsylvania—from 1921 to 1922, compiling a career college football coaching record of 16–11–1. Sharadin was also as the head basketball coach at Defiance during the 1920–21 season, tallying a mark of 8–10. In 1923, he left the college ranks and began successful run at Ford City High School in Ford City, Pennsylvania, where he led the basketball and football teams from 1923 to 1931.

Sharadin played minor league baseball for the Chambersburg Maroons in 1915.

== Head coaching record ==
=== College football ===
Year	Team	Overall	Conference	Standing	Bowl/playoffs
Connecticut Aggies (Athletic League of New England State Colleges) (1912)
1912	Connecticut	3–3	0–0		
Connecticut:		3–3	0–0		
Defiance Yellow Jackets (Independent) (1920)
1920	Defiance	3–4			
Defiance:		3–4			
Cumberland Valley State Normal (Independent) (1921–1922)
1921	Cumberland Valley State Normal	5–1–2			
1922	Cumberland Valley State Normal	5–3			
Cumberland Valley State Normal:		10–4–1			
Total:		16–11–1			
