= Shannon Delany =

American novelist

Shannon Delany is an American fantasy novelist. She is best known for creating the 13 to Life series, published by St. Martin's Press.

== Early life and education ==
Shannon Delany has written stories since she was a child. She graduated from Kutztown University of Pennsylvania, where she studied secondary social studies education.

== Career ==
Delany worked as a teacher before deciding to pursue her writing career. She began writing in earnest when her grandmother fell unexpectedly ill during a family vacation.

In 2008, her greatly abbreviated version of 13 to Life (written in five weeks) won first prize in Textnovel.com's cell phone novel contest. After seeing her work, she was approached by St. Martin's Press to turn her short story into a full-length novel.

The full novel, a young adult romance involving a teenage girl named Jessie and a werewolf called Pietr, was published on June 22, 2010. It was praised by writers Jerri-Smith Ready and Maria V. Snyder.

== Personal life ==
Delaney lives on a farm in Upstate New York, raising heritage livestock and heirloom plants, while writing on the side. Due to her interest in traveling and foreign languages, she is fluent in English, French, German, and Spanish.

== Bibliography ==
- 13 to Life, St. Martin's Griffin, 2010
- Beasts and BFFs (short story), St. Martin's Griffin, 2010
- Secrets and Shadows, St. Martin's Griffin, 2011
- Bargains and Betrayals, St. Martin's Griffin, 2011
- Destiny and Deception, St. Martin's Griffin, 2012
- Rivals and Retribution, St. Martin's Griffin, 2012
- Weather Witch, St. Martin's Press, 2013
- Stormbringer, St. Martin's Griffin, 2014
- Thunderstruck, St. Martin's Griffin, 2014
- Beware the Little White Rabbit, Leap Books, 2015 (co-editor)
- Fright Before Christmas: 13 Tales of Holiday Horrors, Leap Books, 2015 (co-editor)
- Skid by Tracey Martin 2016 (artwork)
