= Thomas John Shillea =

Thomas John Shillea (born 1947) is an American artist who specializes in painting and photography. He is known for using 19th-century printing techniques. He began drawing at the age of two and throughout his childhood made thousands of photorealistic drawings. Shillea earned a BS in Art Education from Kutztown University. He then taught high school art and later earned an MFA degree at the Rochester Institute of Technology.

== Academic work ==
During his graduate work at the Rochester Institute of Technology, he studied museum practices at the George Eastman House. There he learned of the platinum photographs of Alfred Stieglitz and the Photo-Session photographers. At that time he began using a classic 8 in × 10 in (200 mm × 250 mm) view camera and printing exclusively in platinum for his fine art.

After earning his MFA in photography, he was granted access to the laboratories of the British company Johnson Matthey, purveyors and refiners of platinum metals, and collaborated with their scientists for a year and a half.

=== Teaching ===
Shillea was a professor in the applied photography program at RIT and has conducted lectures and workshops on the Platinotype process throughout the country. He later became the director of art programs at Northampton Community College, in Bethlehem, Pennsylvania.

== Photography ==
Shillea is known for using 19th-century photographic processes, such as platinum printing, in his work.

During his career, Shillea was invited to work with the United States Information Agency in Washington, D.C., on a project titled "Gallery of Famous Americans", during which he photographed President Ronald Reagan, civil-rights leader Coretta Scott King, Academy Award–winning actor Sissy Spacek and American publisher Malcolm Forbes.

Shillea's work has been included in numerous solo and group exhibitions, including a one-person survey exhibition at the Allentown Art Museum titled Platinum Visions: Photographs by Thomas John Shillea, which featured photographs from 1978 to 2014.

His photographs are held in the permanent collections of the George Eastman Museum, the Philadelphia Museum of Art, the National Portrait Gallery, the Portland Museum of Art, the Ransom Center at the University of Texas at Austin, the James A. Michener Museum of Art, the Baltimore Museum of Art, the National Museum of African American History and Culture (The Smithsonian), and the Rochester Institute of Technology, among others.

=== Publications ===
Shillea has published two books: The History of the Platinum Print, co-authored with John Hafey, and The Instruction Manual for the Platinum Printing Process.

== Personal life ==
Shillea is married to fine art dealer Santa Bannon, who represents his work. They reside 90 minutes outside New York City, in Bethlehem, Pennsylvania.
