= Salvatore J. Panto Jr. =

American politician

Mayor Salvatore J. Panto Jr.
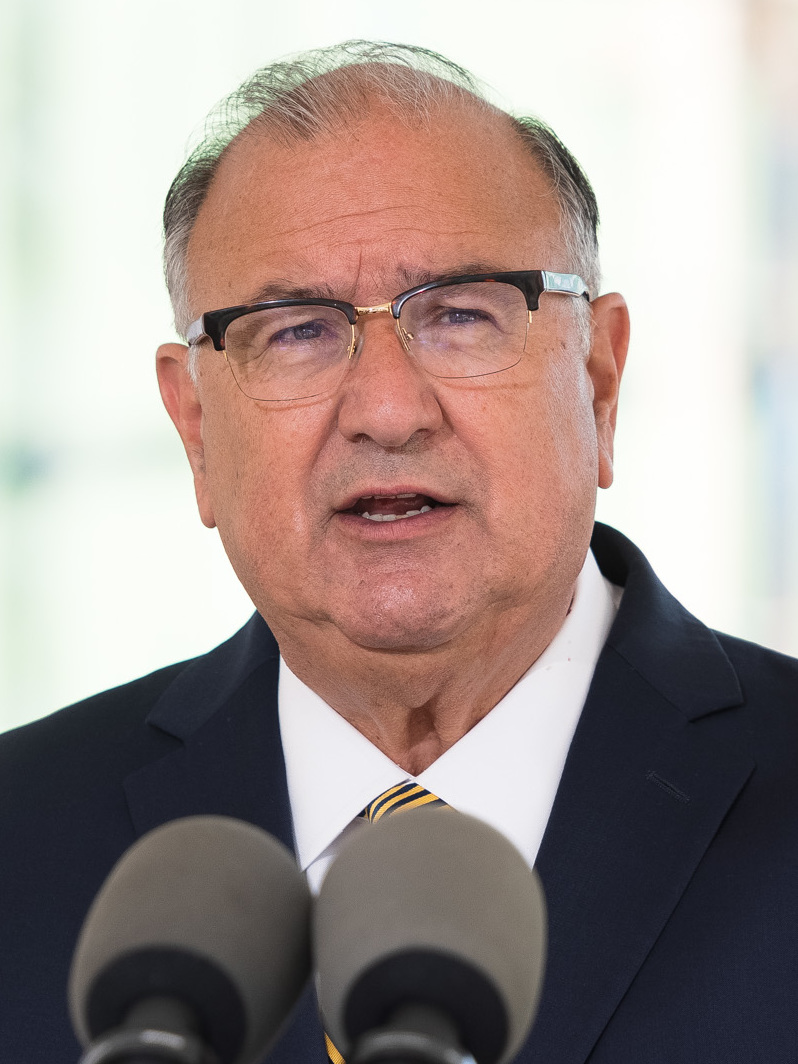
- Panto in 2021

Mayor of Easton, Pennsylvania
- Incumbent
- Assumed office January 2, 2008
- Preceded by: Phil Mitman
- In office 1984–1992
- Preceded by: Phil Mitman
- Succeeded by: Thomas F. Goldsmith

Personal details
- Born: 1953 (age 72–73) Easton, Pennsylvania
- Party: Democratic Party
- Education: Kutztown University of Pennsylvania (Bachelor's); Lehigh University(Master's)
- Website: www.easton-pa.com

Salvatore J. Panto Jr. is an American politician from Pennsylvania who is the current mayor of Easton, Pennsylvania, and has served for seven non-consecutive terms. He first served for two terms from 1984 to 1992 and has continuously been in office again since 2008.

== Early life ==
Panto is an Easton native. He received a Bachelor's degree from Kutztown University of Pennsylvania and a Master's degree from Lehigh University. In 2011 he was awarded an Honorary Doctorate in Public service from Lafayette College. Prior to getting into politics Panto worked for his dad's mom and pop grocery store.

== Political career ==
=== First tenure ===
Panto was elected mayor at the age of 31 in 1983 making him the youngest mayor in Easton's history. In that Democratic Primary Election he came in first against three other candidates including a former two term Mayor and the Democratic Party's designated candidate. During his first tenure he focused on making the city cleaner and safer. He expanded the city's police and fire department and hired more code enforcement officers.

=== Second tenure ===
When he returned to the office of mayor in 2008 the city of Easton was on the verge of filing for Act 47, the municipal equivalent of bankruptcy. However, Panto was able to re-organize city finances to create a surplus budget every year during his second tenure without increasing the real estate tax for sixteen years. His 2007 campaign theme was "Clean and Safe. In 2007 he ran on a campaign to end the rampant drug dealing and gang violence and gun violence plaguing the city. "An advocate for public parks, Panto has expanded the city's park network and also invested $4 million in the city's waterfront parks. In 2017 he received an $850,000 subsidy from the Pennsylvania Department of Conservation and Natural Resources to improve the National Canal Museum and the 520 acre park next to it.

Panto was twice elected the President of the Pennsylvania Municipal League and during his tenure he founded the PennPRIME Municipal Insurance Trust and served as the fist Chairman of the Board. He is the former Chairman of the National League of Cities (NLC) Energy, Environment and Natural Resources Committee and was elected to two terms on the NLC Board of Directors. He currently serves on the NLC Advisory Board.

Panto has also been lauded for his management of the COVID-19 pandemic during which he shut down city hall, furloughed 81 city employees and had all municipal duties performed over video call. This online municipal government system, combined with a $6,000,000 shortfall in the city's budget due to a near total loss of the city's tourism revenue for the nearby casino and the Crayola Experience. Panto was able to salvage the situation by slashing the city's taxes resulting in a large influx of New Yorkers moving to the city to avoid New York City's cost of living and earning the city the moniker "little Manhattan."

On May 16, 2023, Panto defeated Melan, a member of City Council, capturing 70% of the votes in the Democratic primary, and with the Republicans not being competitive in Mayoral elections since 2007, this was largely treated as the election proper. Panto has no Republican challenger on November 5, 2024. This next term will mark his 7th term as Mayor, and 5th consecutive term, making him the longest tenured mayor in Easton's history. However, he vowed this 7th term would be his last, and that he would not seek re-election to an 8th term in 2028, which would make him Mayor for 28 years, 20 of which consecutively. On April 1, Panto partnered with Lafayette College during Literacy Day, reading to an elementary school class in an effort to increase children's interest in books. He is also one of 6 Pennsylvania mayors to attend the 91st meeting of the United States Conference of Mayors.

Panto has received many awards including the Preservation Pennsylvania Municipal Official's Award and the Governor's Local Government Official of the Year Award and was also awarded the Easton Schoolman of the Year Award and many others.

Panto received his bachelor's degree form Kutztown University and his master's degree from Lehigh University and has an Honorary Doctorate from Lafayette College.

== Electoral history ==
2023 Easton mayoral election
Party	Candidate	Votes	%
Democratic	Salvatore J. Panto Jr. (incumbent)	2,982	95.67%
N/A	Write-ins	135	4.33%
Total votes		3,117	100%

2023 Easton Democratic Primary
Party	Candidate	Votes	%
Democratic	Salvatore J. Panto Jr. (incumbent)	1,631	69.85%
Democratic	Peter Melan	704	30.15%
Total votes		2,335	100%

2019 Easton mayoral election
Party	Candidate	Votes	%
Democratic	Salvatore J. Panto Jr. (incumbent)	2,839	81.53%
Republican	Timothy D. Reilly	628	18.04%
N/A	Write-ins	15	0.43%
Total votes		3,482	100.0%
Democratic hold			

2019 Easton Democratic Primary
Party	Candidate	Votes	%
Democratic	Salvatore J. Panto Jr. (incumbent)	1,282	75.86%
Democratic	Taiba Sultana	402	23.79%
Democratic	Write-ins	6	0.36%
Total votes		1,690	100.0%

2015 Easton mayoral election
Party	Candidate	Votes	%
Democratic	Salvatore J. Panto Jr. (incumbent)	1,807	98.64%
N/A	Write-ins	25	1.36%
Total votes		1,832	100.0%
Democratic hold			

2015 Easton Democratic Primary
Party	Candidate	Votes	%
Democratic	Salvatore J. Panto Jr. (incumbent)	1,047	99.71%
Democratic	Write-ins	3	0.29%
Total votes		1,050	100.0%

2011 Easton mayoral election
Party	Candidate	Votes	%
Democratic	Salvatore J. Panto Jr. (incumbent)	2,513	80.54%
Republican	Mike Krill	607	19.46
Total votes		3,120	100.0%
Democratic hold			

2007 Easton mayoral election
Party	Candidate	Votes	%
Democratic	Salvatore J. Panto Jr.	2,370	64.88%
Republican	Gary Bertsch	1,283	35.12%
Total votes		3,653	100%
Democratic gain from Republican			

2007 Easton Democratic Primary
Party	Candidate	Votes	%
Democratic	Salvatore J. Panto Jr.	914	60.13%
Democratic	Michael P. Fleck	606	39.87%
Total votes		1,520	100%

== Personal life ==
Sal has two brothers, Joseph and Paul, and a sister Nancy. His father, Salvatore J. Panto Sr., died on January 22, 2026.
