= Easton, Pennsylvania =

City in Pennsylvania, United States

- City
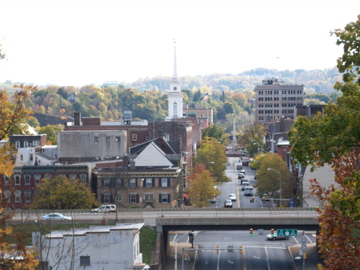
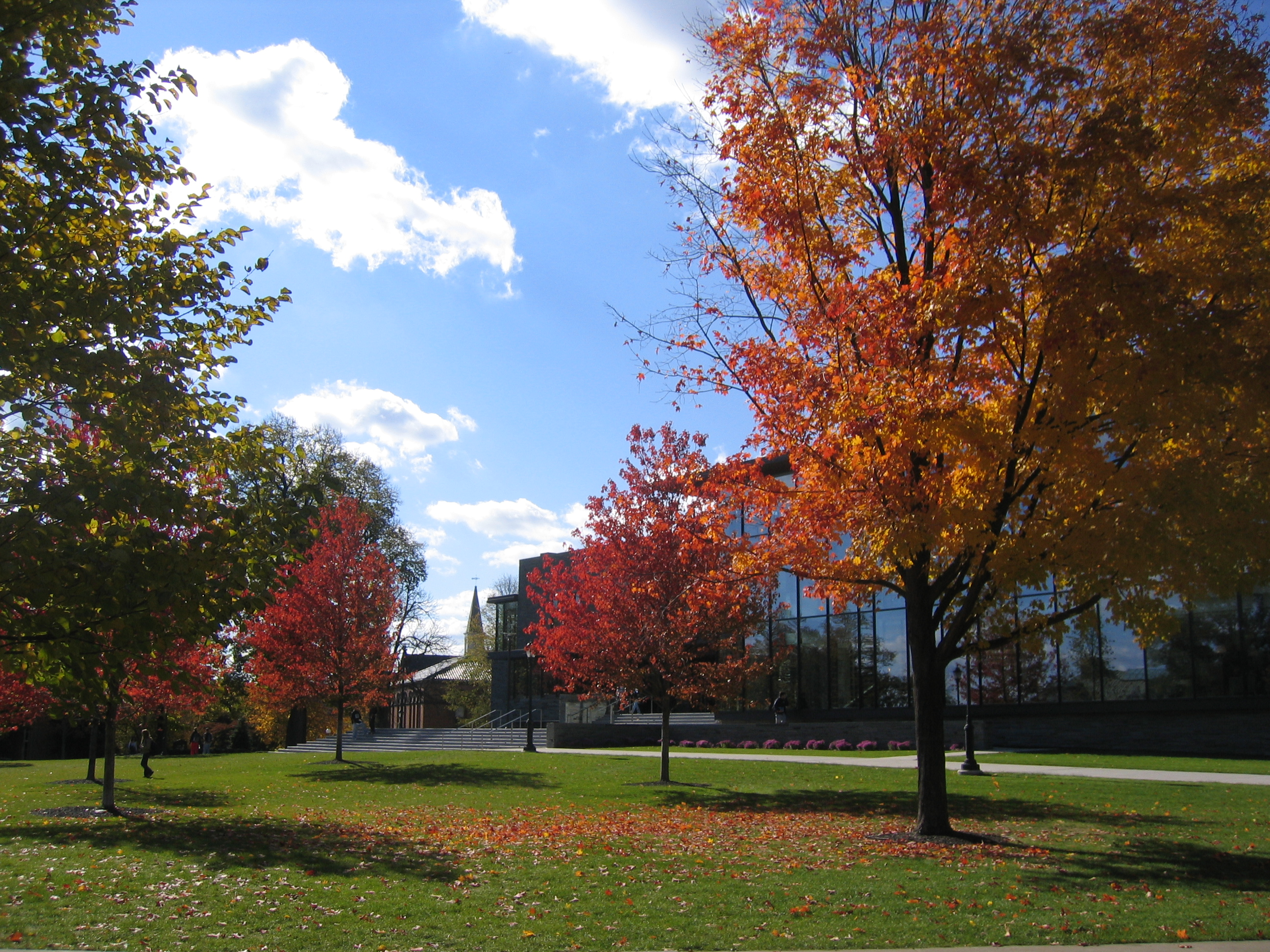
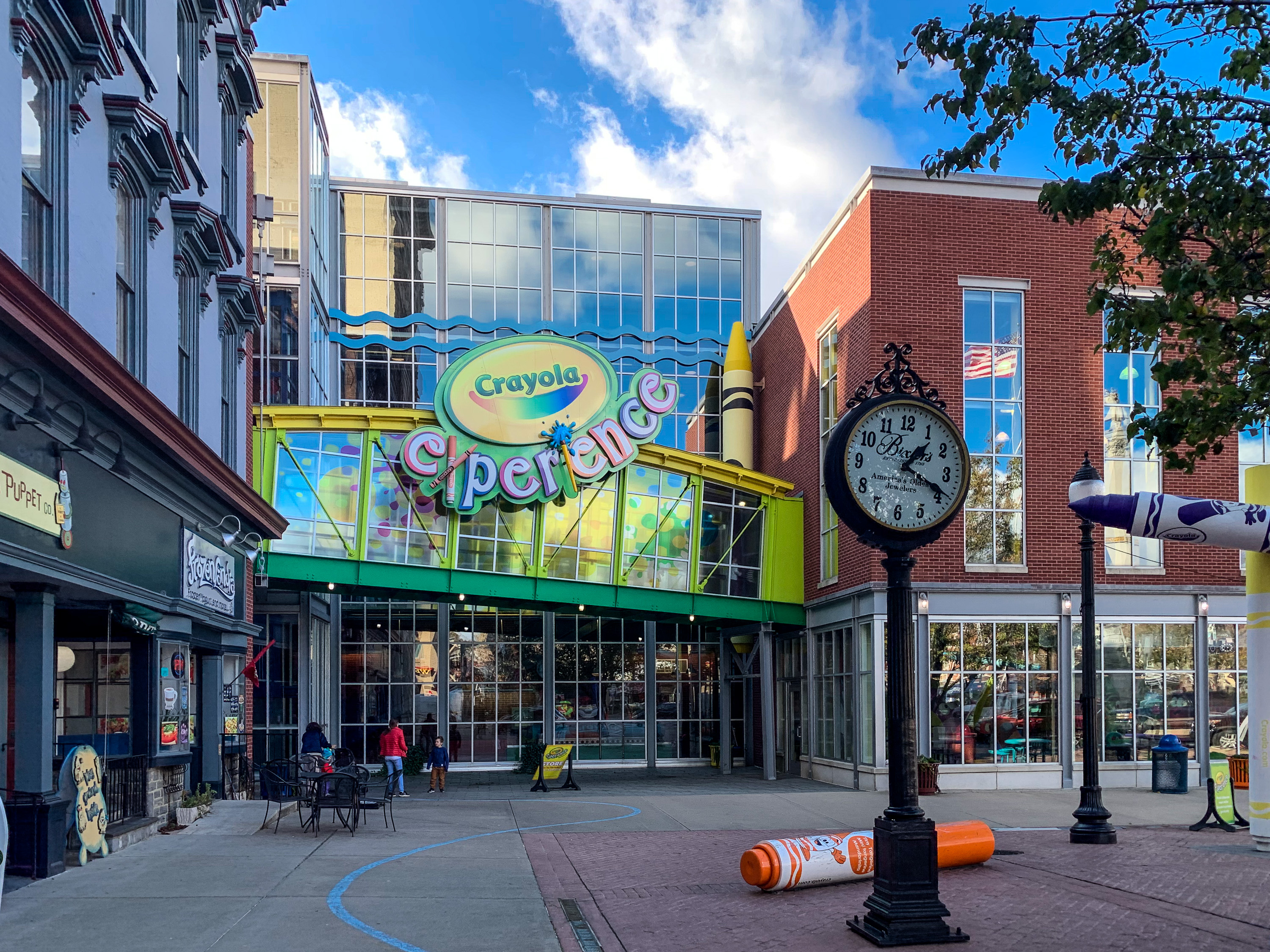
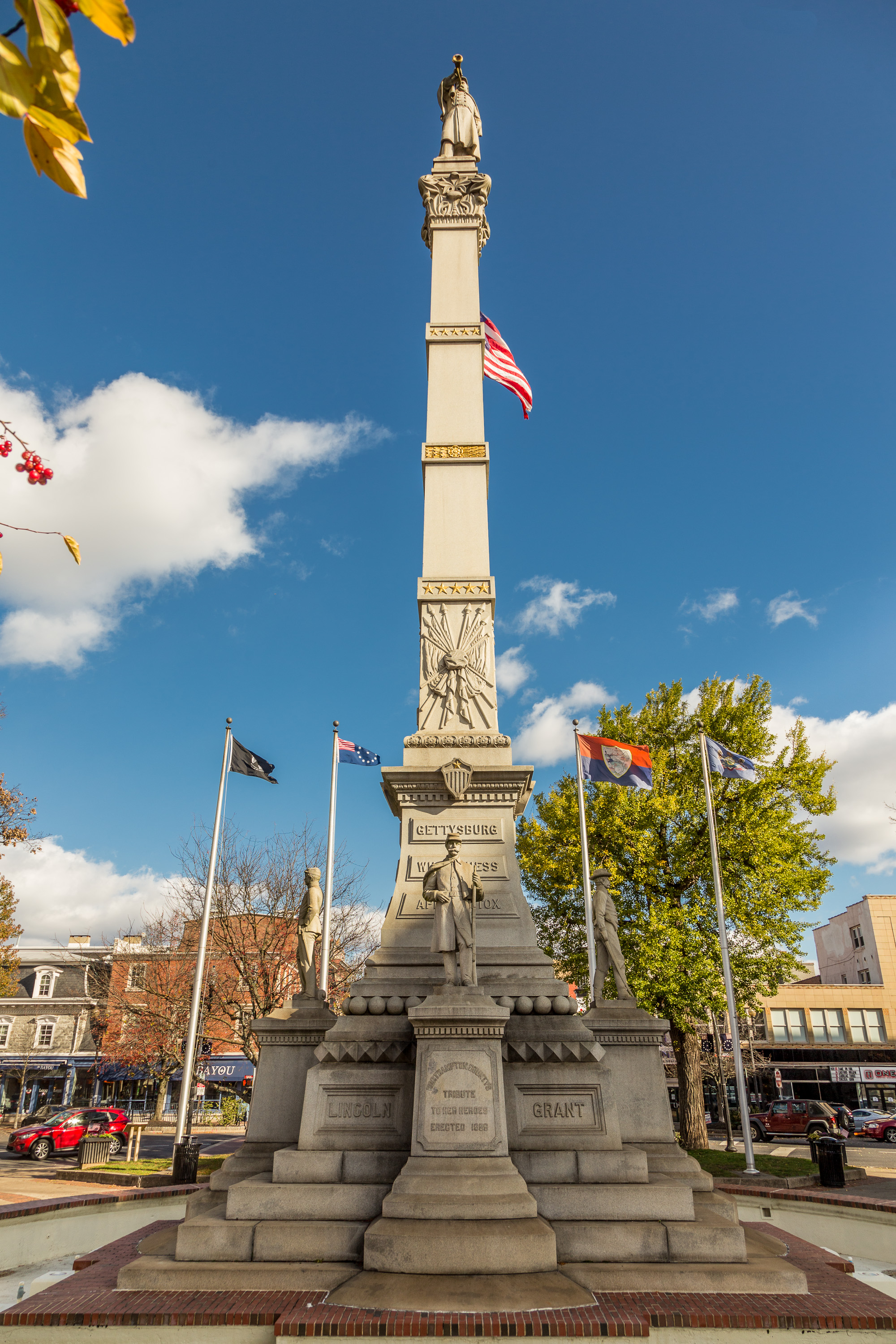
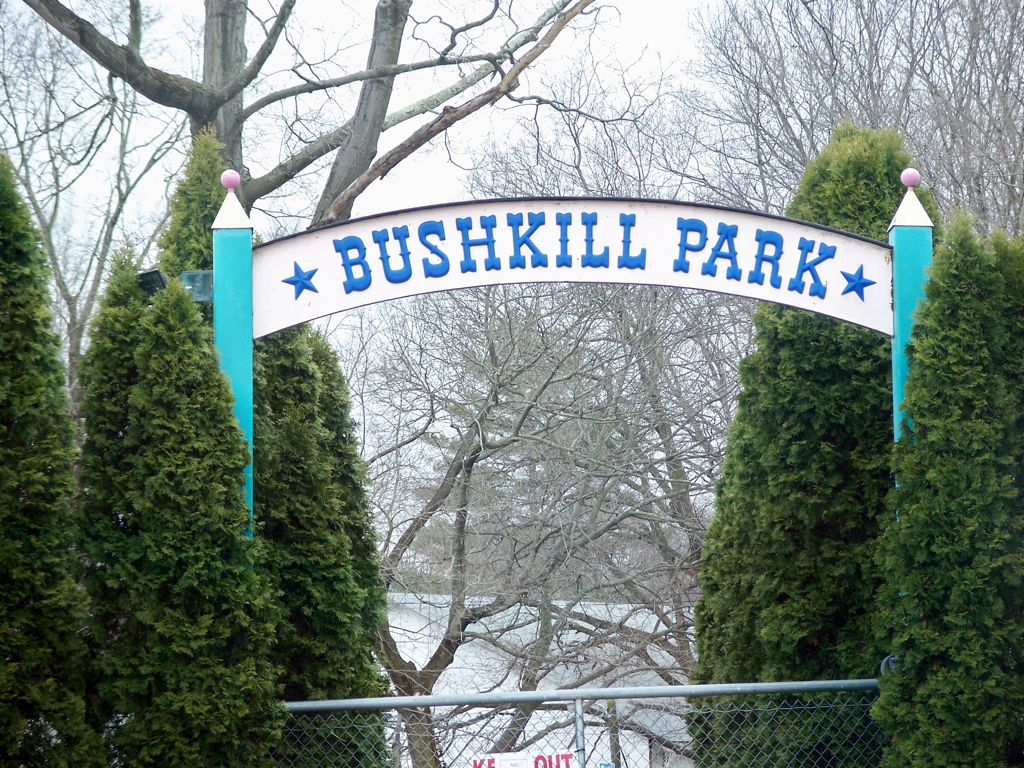
- The Easton skyline in November 2007 Lafayette College Crayola Experience in Downtown Easton Soldiers and Sailors Monument on Centre Square Bushkill Park

- Flag Seal

- Location of Easton in Northampton County, Pennsylvania (left) and of Northampton County in Pennsylvania (right)

- Location of Easton in Pennsylvania Easton (the United States)
- Coordinates: 40°41′18″N 75°12′59″W
- Country: United States
- State: Pennsylvania
- County: Northampton
- First settled: 1739; 287 years ago
- Incorporated as a town: 1752; 274 years ago
- Incorporated as a city: January 12, 1887; 139 years ago

Government
  - Mayor: Salvatore J. Panto Jr. (D)

Area
  - City: 4.86 sq mi (12.59 km^{2})
  - Land: 4.26 sq mi (11.04 km^{2})
  - Water: 0.59 sq mi (1.54 km^{2}) 12.35%
- Elevation: 211 ft (64 m)

Population (2020)
  - City: 28,127
  - Rank: 4th in the Lehigh Valley; 16th in Pennsylvania
  - Density: 6,597.4/sq mi (2,547.27/km^{2})
  - Metro: 865,310 (US: 68th)
- Time zone: UTC– 05:00 (Eastern)
  - Summer (DST): UTC– 04:00 (EDT)
- ZIP Codes: 18040, 18042–18045
- Area codes: 610 and 484
- FIPS code: 42-21648
- Primary airport: Lehigh Valley International Airport
- Major hospital: Lehigh Valley Hospital–Cedar Crest
- School district: Easton Area
- Website: www.easton-pa.com

Easton is a city in and the county seat of Northampton County, Pennsylvania, United States. The city's population was 28,127 as of the 2020 census. Easton straddles the Lehigh River as it flows into the Delaware River, which serves as the city's eastern geographic boundary with Phillipsburg, New Jersey.

Easton is the easternmost city in the Lehigh Valley, a region of 731 square miles (1,890 km^{2}) that is Pennsylvania's third-largest and the nation's 68th-largest metropolitan region with 861,889 residents as of the U.S. 2020 census. The smallest of the Valley's three major cities, Easton has less than half the population of Bethlehem and about one-fourth that of Allentown.

The greater Easton area includes the city of Easton, three townships (Forks, Palmer, and Williams), and three boroughs (Glendon, West Easton, and Wilson). Centre Square, the city's town square in its downtown neighborhood, is home to the Soldiers' and Sailors' Monument, a memorial for Easton-area veterans killed during the American Civil War. In the first half of the 20th century, Centre Square was referred to locally as the Circle. The Peace Candle, a candle-like structure, is assembled and disassembled every year atop the Civil War monument for the Christmas season.

Norfolk Southern Railway's Lehigh Line, formerly the main line of the Lehigh Valley Railroad, runs through Easton on its way from Phillipsburg to Bethlehem and Allentown. Easton sits 14 miles (23 km) northeast of Allentown, 51 miles (82 km) north of Philadelphia, and 64 miles (103 km) west of New York City.

== Etymology ==
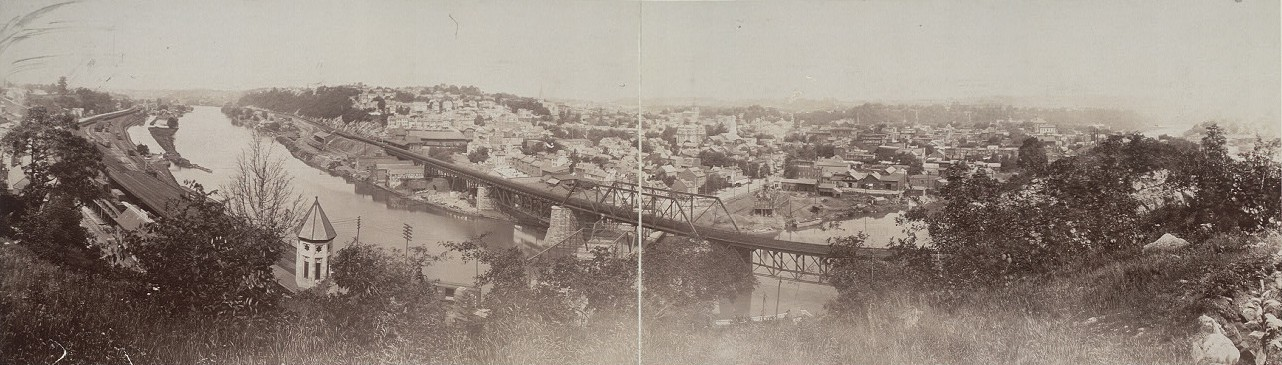
Easton, photographed by William H. Rau, c. 1896

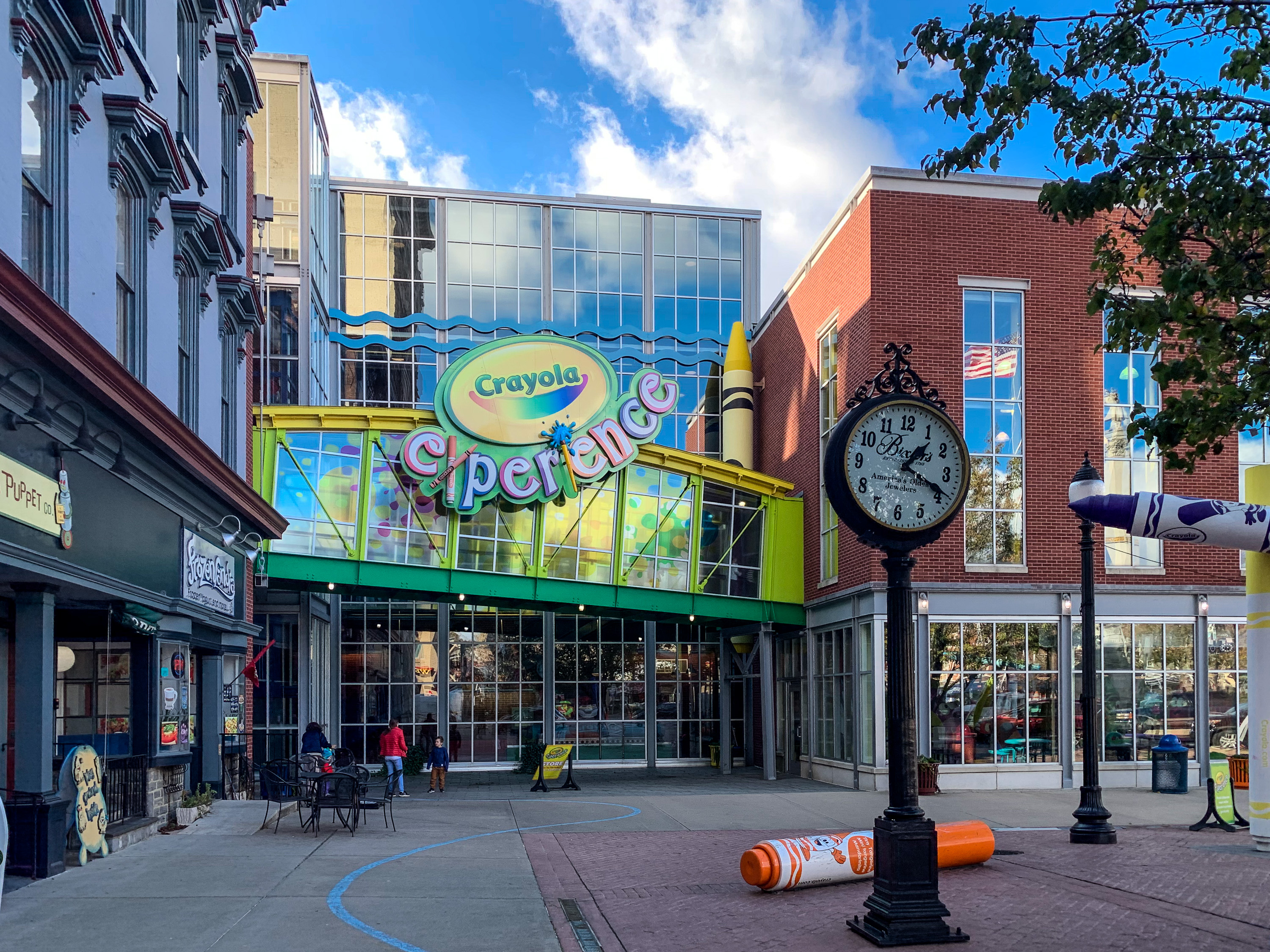
Crayola Experience in downtown Easton in November 2019

On August 22, 1751, Thomas Penn, the son of William Penn, the colony's founder and original proprietor married Juliana Fermor. On September 8, 1751, Penn wrote a letter to Colonial Governor James Hamilton requesting that a new town on the confluence of the Lehigh and Delaware Rivers be named Easton and that it be in a new county called Northampton. In 1752, as requested, the city was named in honor of Lady Juliana's family estate, the Easton Neston. The county was named after the estate's location, which was in the south of Northamptonshire, England.

== History ==
The Lenape Native Americans originally referred to present-day Easton and its surrounding region as Lechauwitank, meaning "the Place at the Forks".

=== 18th century ===
The land that includes present-day Easton was obtained from the Lenape in the Walking Purchase in 1737. A plaque commemorating the transaction appears in Easton's town square.

Thomas Penn set aside a 1,000-acre (4 km^{2}) tract of land at the confluence of the Lehigh and Delaware Rivers for the town's establishment, and the city was formally founded in 1752. The same year, Easton was selected as the county seat of Northampton County. The municipality's street and town plan were first laid out by the surveyor William Parsons, who was commissioned by Penn.

During the French and Indian War, the Treaty of Easton was signed in Easton by the British colonial government then governing the Province of Pennsylvania and the Native American tribes, including the Shawnee and Lenape, from what was then called Ohio Country.

Easton and the broader Lehigh Valley region played an instrumental and supportive role during the American Revolution, which commenced in 1775. In recognition of the strong pro-revolutionary sentiment in the city and region, Easton was one of only three designated locations, along with Philadelphia and Trenton, New Jersey, where the Declaration of Independence was read aloud in public for the first time on July 8, 1776, at noon, four days following its unanimous passage by the Second Continental Congress in Philadelphia. During the Declaration's reading in Easton, the Easton flag was flown, making it one of the first non-colonial flags to fly in the Thirteen Colonies. The same flag was later used by a militia during the War of 1812 and currently serves as Easton's municipal flag.

Easton maintained a hospital used in the treatment of injured Continental Army soldiers during the war. On June 18, 1779, General John Sullivan led 2,500 Continental Army soldiers from Easton to engage Indian allies of the British Army on the frontier.

=== 19th century ===
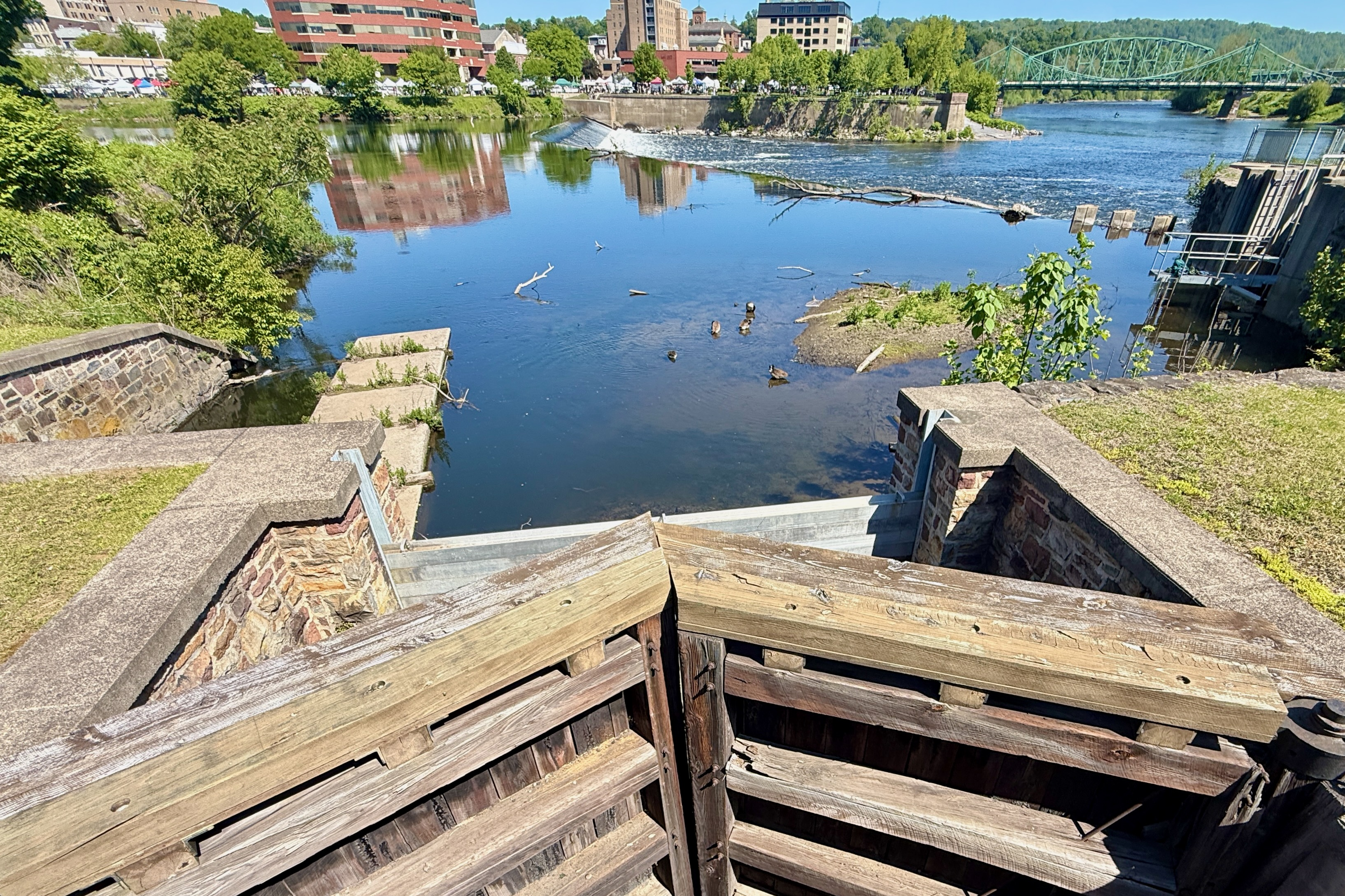
Easton Lock of the Delaware Canal on the Lehigh River

Located at the confluence of the rapidly flowing Lehigh River and the deeper and wider Delaware River, Easton became a major commercial center during the canal and railroad periods of the 19th century and a transportation hub for the region's coal, iron, and steel industries. The Delaware Canal was built soon after the lower Lehigh Canal was opened in 1818 and became effective in delivering much-needed anthracite coal to the region's largest markets, Philadelphia, New Jersey, and New York City.

Seeing other ways of exploiting the new fuel source, other entrepreneurs quickly moved to connect across the Delaware River reaching into the New York City area to the east through the Morris Canal in Phillipsburg, New Jersey, so the town became a canal hub from which coal from Mauch Chunk reached the world. Early railroads were often built to parallel this transportation corridor.

Historians of angling believe that, in 1845, Samuel Phillipe, an Easton gunsmith, invented the six-strip split-cane bamboo fly rod; this is commemorated by a Pennsylvania Historical and Museum Commission plaque near Easton's Center Square.

By the late 1860s, the Lehigh and Susquehanna Railroad (LH&S) and Lehigh Valley Railroad (LVRR) were built to augment the bulk traffic through the canals and provide lucrative passenger travel services. The LVRR, known as the Black Diamond Line operated twice daily express passenger trains to and from New York City and Buffalo, New York via Easton. The Central Railroad of New Jersey (CNJ), leased and operated the LH&S tracks from the 1870s until the Conrail consolidations absorbed both the Central Railroad of New Jersey and Lehigh Valley Railroad in 1966. Today, the Lehigh Valley Railroad's main line is the only major rail line that goes through Easton and is now known as the Lehigh Line; the Lehigh Line was bought by the Norfolk Southern Railway in 1999.

In the mid-19th century, canal transportation was largely replaced by railroads, and Easton became a hub for five railroads, including the Jersey Central, Lehigh Valley Railroad, and others. Easton lost its prominence in passenger transportation with the rise of the automobile in the mid-20th century.

=== 20th and 21st centuries ===
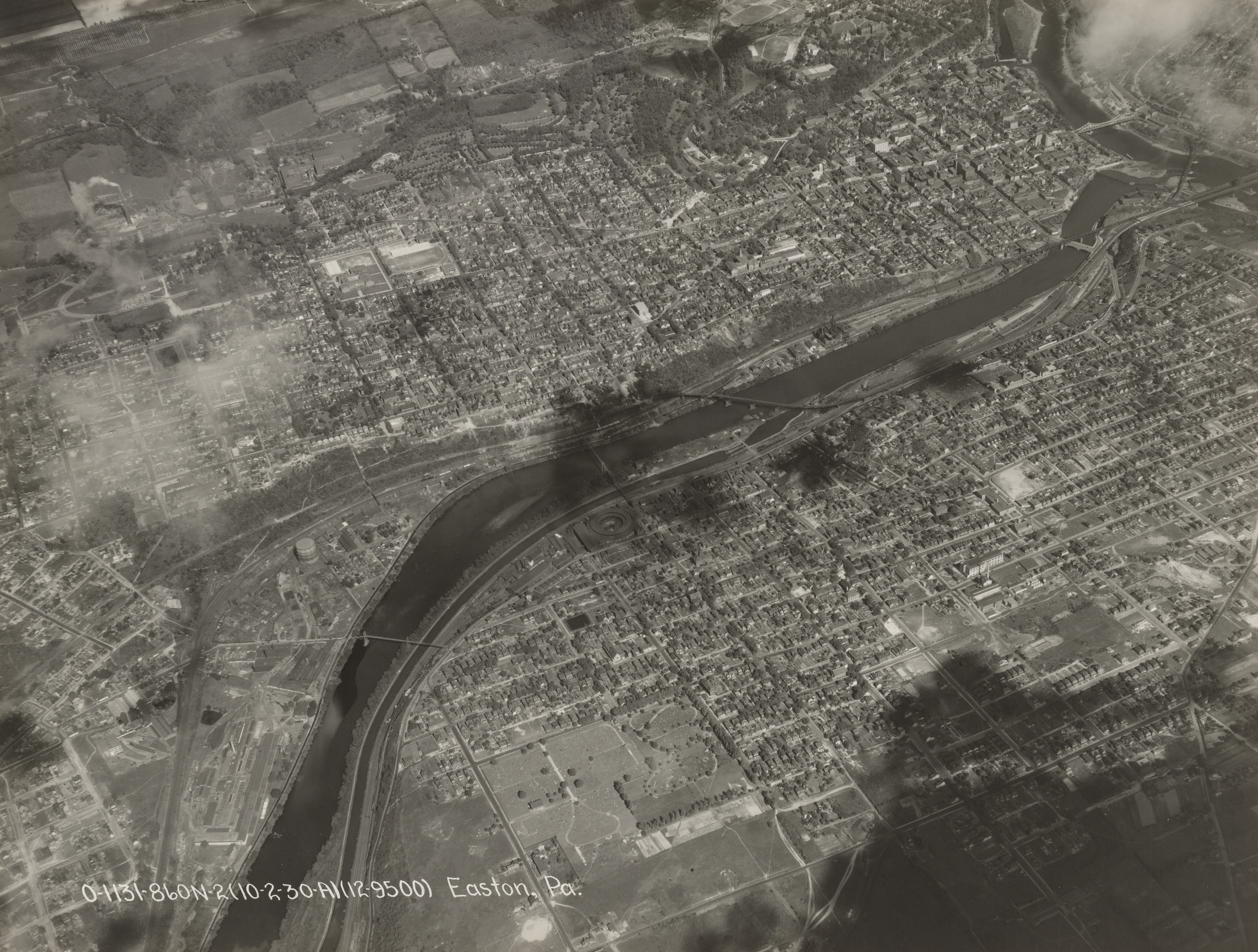
Easton in 1930

Like the Pennsylvania Dutch region to the southwest, Easton was settled largely by Germans. The Pennsylvania Argus, a German language newspaper, was published in Easton until 1917. As part of their heritage, the Germans put up one of the continent's earliest Christmas trees in Easton; Daniel Foley's book states that, "Another diary reference unearthed recently makes mention of a tree set-up at Easton, Pennsylvania, in 1816." A plaque in Scott Park along the Delaware River commemorates this event. The Pennsylvania Guide, compiled by the Writers' Program of the Works Progress Administration in 1940, described the rich and cosmopolitan fabric of Easton's society in the first half of the 20th century:

The city is a composite of a hurried commercial present and a sedate mercantile past, leavened by a carefree college atmosphere. Coeds, dressed according to the dictates of Hollywood, and college boys in sports clothes and near-white buckskin shoes worn without regard for time or season, rub elbows with frugal Pennsylvania Dutch. A familiar sight on market days is the trucks and wagons, loaded with farm produce, drawn up to the curb at the Circle [Centre Square]. Women, scrupulously clean in their calico house dresses, and men in overalls or 'Sunday best,' arrange makeshift counters on which to display their vegetables, meats, crocks of apple butter, and pastries.

— Federal Writers' Project, "Part II: Cities and Towns, Pennsylvania: A Guide to the Keystone State (1940)

On December 16, 1925, the nation's largest fraternity, Alpha Phi Omega, was founded at Lafayette College in Easton.

== Geography ==
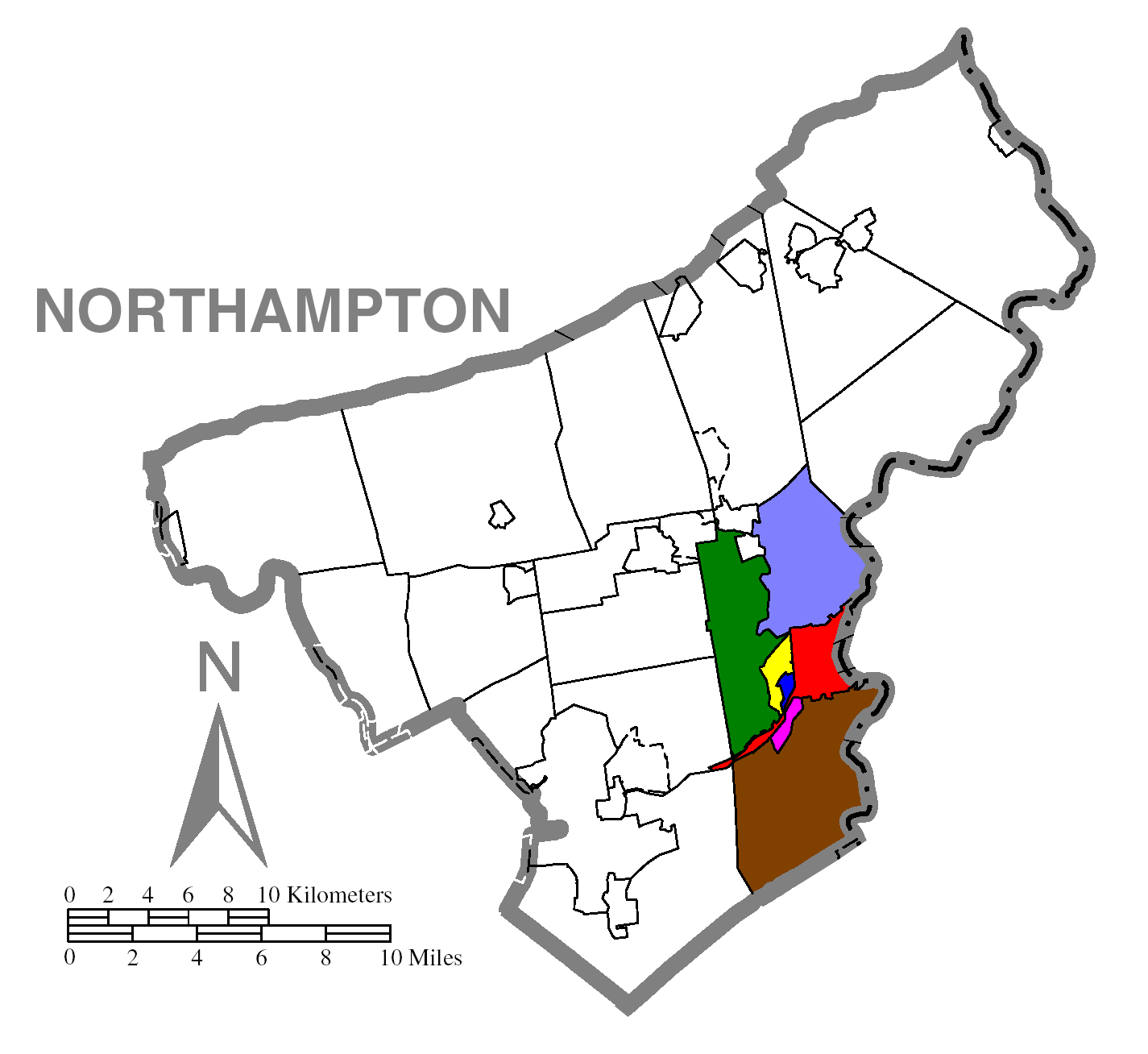
The following municipalities make up the area of Greater Easton: City of Easton Borough of West Easton Borough of Wilson Borough of Glendon Palmer Township Forks Township Williams Township

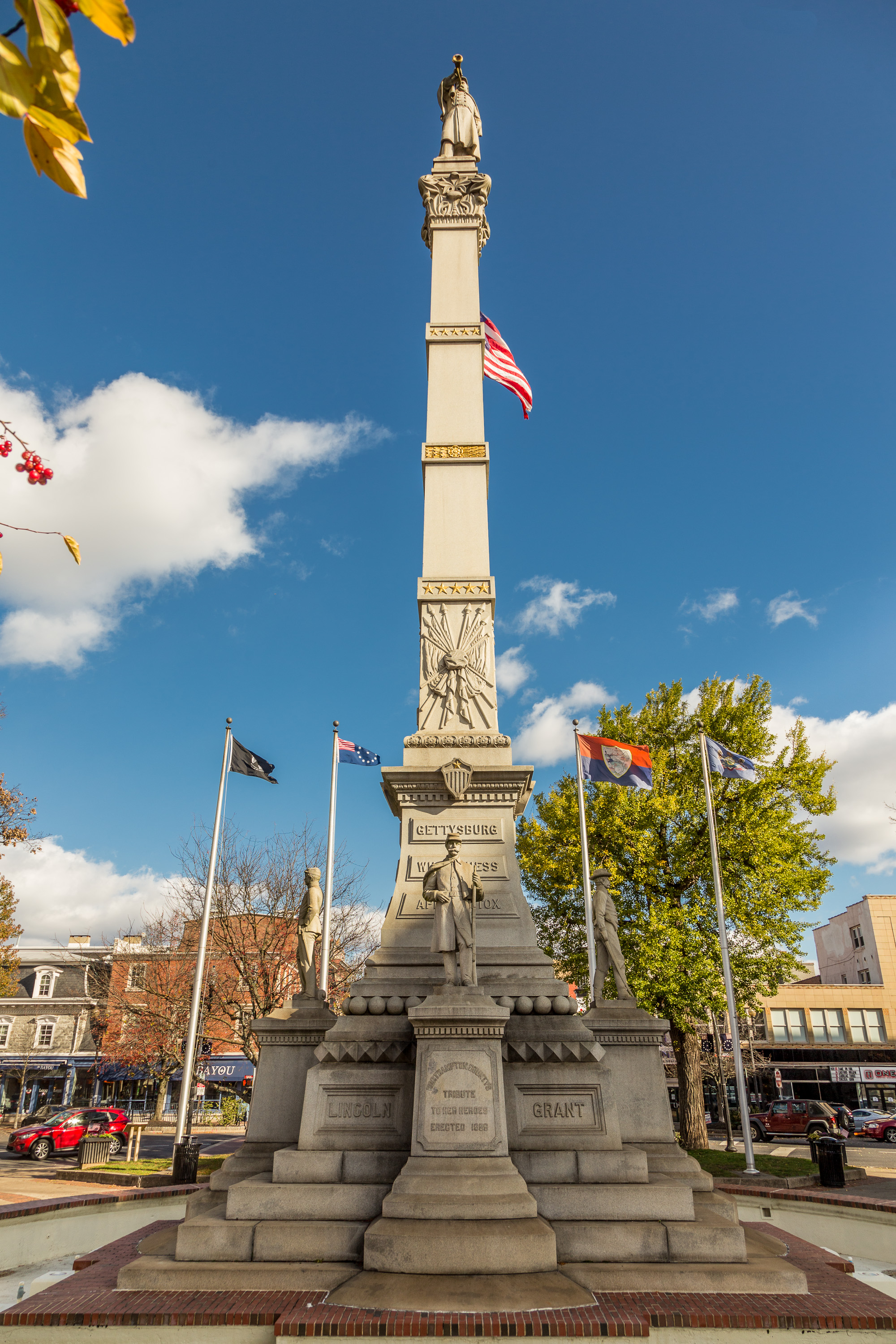
Soldiers and Sailors Monument, a monument to local Civil War veterans in downtown Easton - November 2019

The Northampton Street Bridge and the Easton–Phillipsburg Toll Bridge, connecting Easton and Phillipsburg, New Jersey

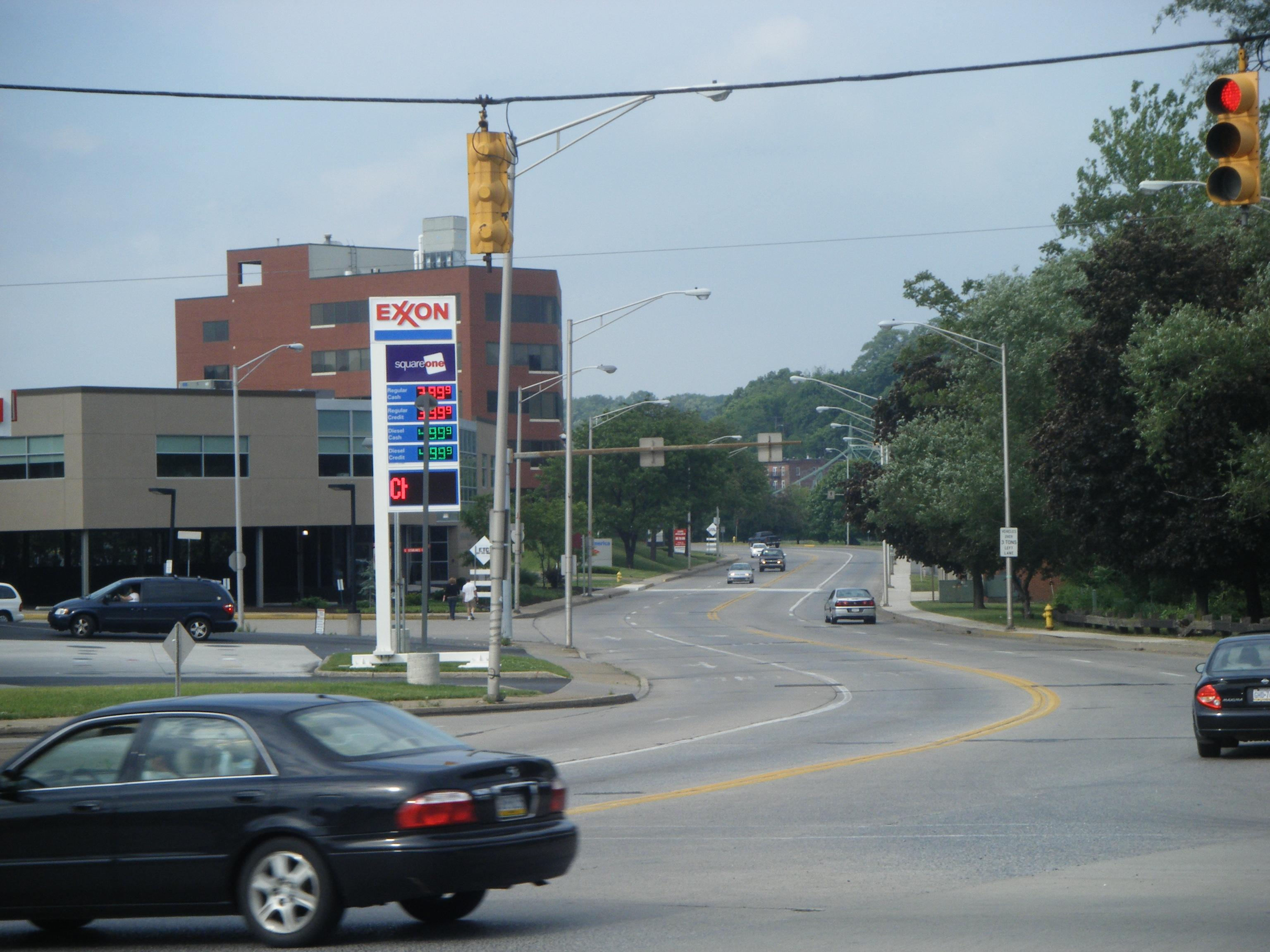
Larry Holmes Drive, an Easton street named in honor of Easton resident and former boxing heavyweight champion Larry Holmes, who fought under the nickname "The Easton Assassin"

Easton is located at 40°41′18″N 75°12′59″W (40.688248, −75.216458). According to the U.S. Census Bureau, the city has a total area of 4.7 square miles (12 km^{2}), 4.3 square miles (11 km^{2}) of which is land and 0.4 square miles (1.0 km^{2}) (8.39%) of which is water, including Bushkill Creek and the Lehigh and Delaware rivers. It also includes an island, Getter's Island, which was the site of Pennsylvania's last public execution.

=== Districts ===
Easton is divided into four districts: Downtown (DD), College Hill (CH), South Side (SS), and West Ward (WW). A number of smaller additional parks and institutional districts also exist.

Downtown Easton lies at the confluence of the Lehigh River and Delaware River and is a low-lying area surrounded by hills to the north, west, and south. North of downtown is College Hill, home of Lafayette College. South Easton, divided by the Lehigh River from the rest of the city, was a separate borough until 1898; it was settled initially by Native Americans and later by canal workers, and home to several silk mills. Wilson, West Easton, and Glendon are directly adjacent to the city. Wilson partly aligns to the same north–south grid as Easton.

City of Easton Districts
Division		Population		Land area		Density	
District	Abbr	Census (2018 est.)	%	square miles	square km	persons / mi^{2}	persons / km^{2}
Downtown	DD	2,240	8%	0.67	1.74	3,343	1,287
College Hill	CH	5,400	20%	2.03	5.26	2,660	1,027
South Side	SS	8,720	32%	2.92	7.56	2,986	1,153
West Ward	WW	10,530	39%	1.95	5.05	5,400	2,085
City of Easton		26,890					

==== Downtown Historic District ====
Easton's Historic Downtown District lies directly at the confluence of the north banks of the Lehigh River and west banks of the Delaware River. Downtown adjoins each of the three other districts to the north, west, and south. Downtown continues west to Sixth Street and north to US Route 22.

==== College Hill ====
College Hill is located north of downtown, starting north of US Route 22. This neighborhood is home of Lafayette College, a liberal arts and engineering institution.

==== South Side ====
The South Side district lies south of the Lehigh River.

==== West Ward ====
The West Ward district is located west of downtown and encompasses much of west side Easton between Sixth and Fifteenth Streets.

=== Climate ===
Under the Köppen climate classification, Easton falls within either a hot-summer humid continental climate (Dfa) if the 0 °C (32 °F) isotherm is used or a humid subtropical climate (Cfa) if the −3 °C (27 °F) isotherm is used. Summers are usually hot and very muggy, averaging in the mid-80s during the day, though the high humidity makes it feel much warmer. Fall and spring months are typically mild, offering many days in the mid-60s, as well as stronger winds. Winters are usually very cold and produce about 30 inches of snow. The local hardiness zone is 6b.

Climate data for Easton
Month	Jan	Feb	Mar	Apr	May	Jun	Jul	Aug	Sep	Oct	Nov	Dec	Year
Record high °F (°C)	72 (22)	81 (27)	87 (31)	93 (34)	97 (36)	100 (38)	105 (41)	100 (38)	99 (37)	93 (34)	80 (27)	72 (22)	105 (41)
Mean daily maximum °F (°C)	36 (2)	40 (4)	49 (9)	61 (16)	72 (22)	80 (27)	84 (29)	82 (28)	75 (24)	64 (18)	53 (12)	41 (5)	61 (16)
Mean daily minimum °F (°C)	19 (−7)	22 (−6)	29 (−2)	39 (4)	48 (9)	58 (14)	63 (17)	61 (16)	53 (12)	41 (5)	33 (1)	24 (−4)	41 (5)
Record low °F (°C)	−15 (−26)	−12 (−24)	−5 (−21)	12 (−11)	28 (−2)	39 (4)	46 (8)	41 (5)	30 (−1)	21 (−6)	3 (−16)	−8 (−22)	−15 (−26)
Average precipitation inches (mm)	3.03 (77)	2.80 (71)	3.39 (86)	3.56 (90)	4.14 (105)	4.31 (109)	4.95 (126)	3.69 (94)	4.62 (117)	3.88 (99)	3.50 (89)	3.58 (91)	42.45 (1,078)
Source: Weather Channel

== Government ==
Easton operates a mayor-on-council city government. Residents elect a city controller, six city councilpersons (three at large and three district), and a mayor who is chairman and a voting member of the city council. All these officials are elected to four-year terms. The incumbent mayor, Democrat Salvatore J. Panto, Jr., was reelected to his fourth consecutive term in 2019; he previously served two terms as Easton mayor from 1984 to 1992.

Easton is part of Pennsylvania's 7th congressional district, represented in the U.S. House of Representatives currently by Republican Ryan Mackenzie, who was first elected to the office in 2024.

== Demographics ==
Historical population
Census	Pop.	Note	%±
1790	708		—
1800	1,045		47.6%
1810	1,657		58.6%
1820	2,370		43.0%
1830	3,529		48.9%
1840	4,865		37.9%
1850	7,250		49.0%
1860	8,944		23.4%
1870	10,987		22.8%
1880	11,924		8.5%
1890	14,481		21.4%
1900	25,238		74.3%
1910	28,523		13.0%
1920	33,813		18.5%
1930	34,468		1.9%
1940	33,589		−2.6%
1950	35,632		6.1%
1960	31,955		−10.3%
1970	29,450		−7.8%
1980	26,027		−11.6%
1990	26,276		1.0%
2000	26,263		0.0%
2010	26,800		2.0%
2020	28,127		5.0%

=== 2020 census ===
As of the 2020 census, Easton had a population of 28,127. The median age was 32.9 years. 21.1% of residents were under the age of 18 and 12.5% of residents were 65 years of age or older. For every 100 females there were 101.1 males, and for every 100 females age 18 and over there were 99.0 males age 18 and over.

100.0% of residents lived in urban areas, while 0.0% lived in rural areas.

There were 9,956 households in Easton, of which 30.3% had children under the age of 18 living in them. Of all households, 32.1% were married-couple households, 24.1% were households with a male householder and no spouse or partner present, and 33.0% were households with a female householder and no spouse or partner present. About 33.1% of all households were made up of individuals and 10.5% had someone living alone who was 65 years of age or older.

There were 10,899 housing units, of which 8.7% were vacant. The homeowner vacancy rate was 2.2% and the rental vacancy rate was 5.4%.

Racial composition as of the 2020 census
Race	Number	Percent
White	15,652	55.6%
Black or African American	4,914	17.5%
American Indian and Alaska Native	182	0.6%
Asian	687	2.4%
Native Hawaiian and Other Pacific Islander	17	0.1%
Some other race	3,352	11.9%
Two or more races	3,323	11.8%
Hispanic or Latino (of any race)	7,244	25.8%

=== 2010 census ===
As of the 2010 census, the city was 67.2% White, 16.8% Black or African American, 0.4% Native American, 2.4% Asian, 0.1% Native Hawaiian, and 4.9% were two or more races. 19.9% of the population were of Latino ancestry. The increase in Latinos—from less than 10% of the population in the 2000 census, to nearly 20% in the 2010 census, is a significant change in the city's demographics. The growth in Latino residents is similar to increases in Allentown and Bethlehem, the Valley's two largest cities.

=== 2000 census ===
As of the 2000 census, there were 26,263 people, 9,544 households, and 5,735 families residing in the city. The population density was 6,168.4 inhabitants per square mile (2,381.6/km^{2}). There were 10,545 housing units at an average density of 2,476.7 per square mile (956.3/km^{2}). The racial makeup of the city was 78.48% White, 12.71% African American, 0.24% Native American, 1.66% Asian, 0.11% Pacific Islander, 3.67% from other races, and 3.13% from two or more races. Latino or Latino of any race were 9.79% of the population.

There were 9,544 households, out of which 30.5% had children under the age of 18 living with them, 37.7% were married couples living together, 16.6% had a female householder with no husband present, and 39.9% were non-families. 31.5% of all households were made up of individuals, and 11.0% had someone living alone who was 65 years of age or older. The average household size was 2.46 and the average family size was 3.10.

In the city, the population was spread out, with 23.3% under the age of 18, 16.3% from 18 to 24, 29.9% from 25 to 44, 18.6% from 45 to 64, and 11.9% who were 65 years of age or older. The median age was 32 years. For every 100 females, there were 97.4 males. For every 100 females age 18 and over, there were 96.1 males. The median income for a household in the city was $33,162, and the median income for a family was $38,704. Males had a median income of $32,356 versus $23,609 for females. The per capita income for the city was $15,949. About 12.3% of families and 16.0% of the population were below the poverty line, including 21.3% of those under age 18 and 11.2% of those age 65 or over.

Easton
- Crime rates* (2008)

Violent crimes
- Homicide: 7.7
- Rape: 49.9
- Robbery: 299.2
- Aggravated assault: 245.5
- Total violent crime: 602.2

Property crimes
- Burglary: 602.1
- Larceny-theft: 3,068.4
- Motor vehicle theft: 253.2
- Arson: 42.2
- Total property crime: 3,923.8
- Note: Reported crimes per 100,000 population Source: 2008 FBI UCR Data

== Education ==
=== Public education ===
Easton Area School District serves public school students from Easton, Forks Township, Palmer Township, and portions of Lower Mount Bethel Township including Martins Creek to the north. As of the 2000 census, the combined population of the municipalities in the Easton Area School District was 53,554.

The school district has seven elementary schools: Cheston, Forks, March, Palmer, Paxinosa, Shawnee, and Tracy for grades K-5, Easton Area Middle School Campus (in Forks Township) for grades 6–8, and Easton Area High School (in Palmer Township) for grades 9–12. Total student enrollment in the school district is approximately 8,289 students in all grades as of 2020–21.

Easton Area High School is known for its long-standing athletic rivalry with Phillipsburg High School in neighboring Phillipsburg, New Jersey. The two teams play an annual football game on Thanksgiving Day that is considered one of the largest and longest-standing rivalries in American high school football. In 2006, the rivalry marked its 100th anniversary. The game, which was broadcast on ESPN, was won by Easton. In 2009, Easton was the location of the Gatorade REPLAY Game in which the 1993 teams from the Easton vs. Phillipsburg game met again following their 7–7 tie in 1993. The REPLAY Game was won by Phillipsburg, 27–12.

Easton Area High School competes in the Eastern Pennsylvania Conference, which includes the 12 largest high schools in the Lehigh Valley and Poconos and is one of the nation's most elite high school athletic conferences. Easton holds the third most conference championships in all sports, behind only Parkland High School and Emmaus High School. Easton is also home to Notre Dame High School, a Catholic school.

=== Post-secondary education ===
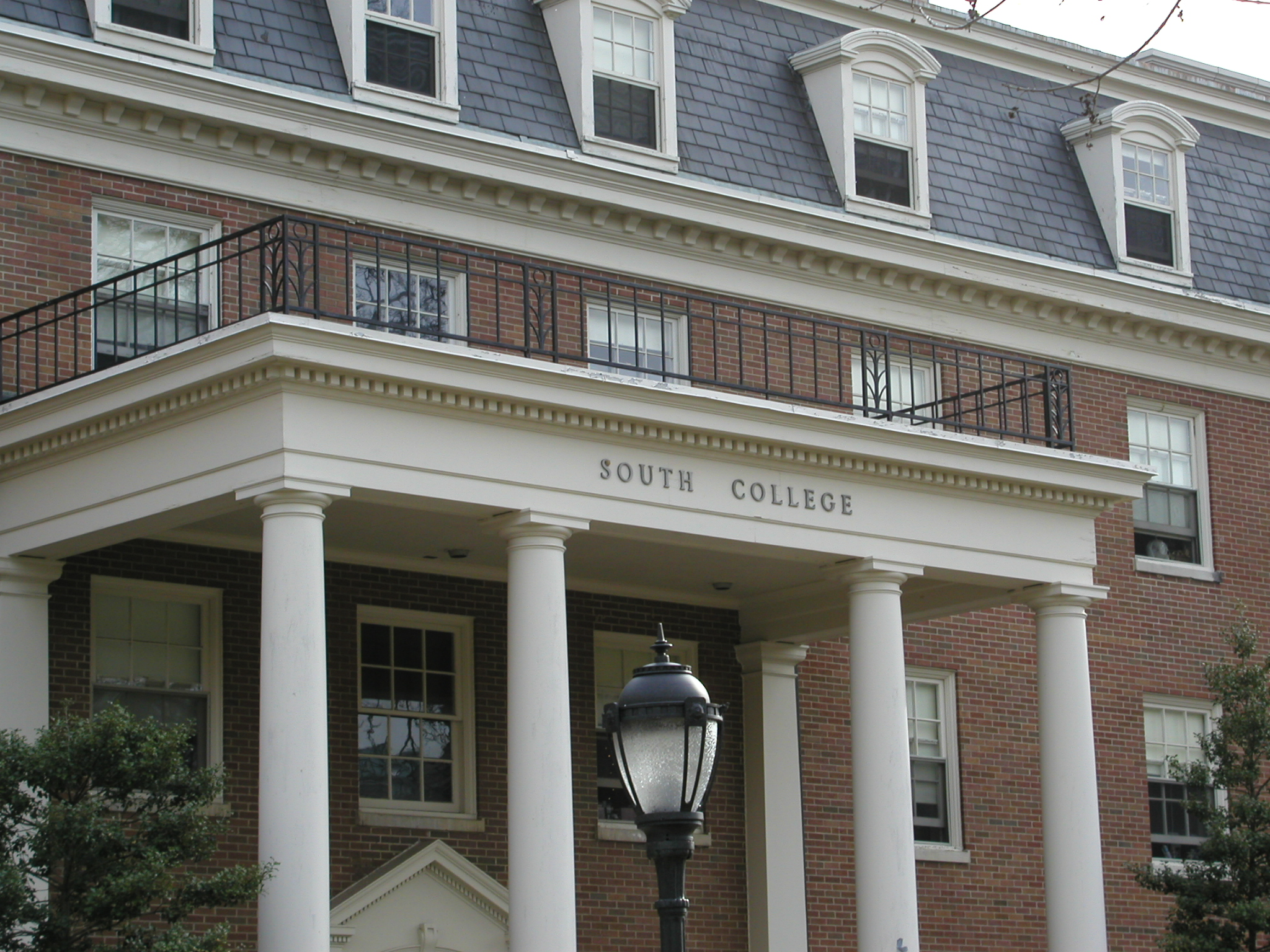
Lafayette College, founded in 1826 in Easton, April 2005

Easton is the home of one four-year college, Lafayette College, which was established in 1826. Lafayette is located in Easton's College Hill section and is home to 2,514 undergraduate students as of the 2022–2023 academic year. In 2017, U.S. News & World Report ranked Lafayette as the nation's 36th best liberal arts college.

Prior to the American Civil War, Easton was also home to Union Law School, which was founded in 1846 but struggled soon after the death of its founder Judge Washington McCartney in 1856. While at least two students, future U.S. Representative Philip Johnson and Wisconsin state senator Robert L. D. Potter, attended the school, a historian in 2000 described Union Law School as not being able to sustain itself after McCartney's death, writing that the school was "a one-man operation that died with him."

== Arts and culture ==
Easton has a long history of involvement with arts and culture, encompassing both the promotion of artistic and cultural events and serving as the home or birthplace of many notable artists. The city is home to the State Theatre Center for the Arts, a restored 1920s vaudeville and movie palace that now hosts concerts, theatrical productions, and exhibitions. It is also home to the Sigal Museum, a history museum that grew out of the Northampton County Historical and Genealogical Society. Alongside long-standing institutions such as the Arts Community of Easton (ACE) and the Karl Stirner Arts Trail, a range of smaller galleries and community organizations contribute to the city's cultural life. Local and visiting artists regularly present work in Easton, and the city has become a subject of artistic interpretation in photography, painting, and literature.

The city and surrounding area have produced notable musicians such as guitarist Greg Howe and jazz pianist Mulgrew Miller, as well as dancers like Jennie Somogyi, who trained in classical ballet and, after an injury, opened a ballet school in Easton. Easton's visual arts scene includes historical artists such as fraktur artist Johannes Ernst Spangenberg, known as the Easton Bible Artist, painters such as Frederick Knecht Detwiller, and documentary photographer Ed Eckstein. Photographer Peter Ydeen created a comprehensive photographic documentation of Easton at night, capturing its streets and urban landscapes in his series Easton Nights. Karl Stirner, the namesake of the Karl Stirner Arts Trail, maintained a large Ferry Street warehouse that served as both a studio and the center of artist engagement in Easton.

== Industry ==
Easton is the home of 27 interactive children's attractions, and the National Canal Museum, which focuses on the region's canal history, and the Crayola Experience, which is owned by Crayola LLC, formerly known as Binney & Smith, a major toy manufacturer based in nearby Forks Township. The global headquarters for Victaulic is based in nearby Forks Township. Easton also was once the home of Dixie Cup Corporation, manufacturer of Dixie Cups and other consumer products. Majestic Athletic, longtime provider of Major League Baseball uniforms prior to the 2019 season, is headquartered in nearby Palmer Township.

The Lehigh Valley Railroad, Central Railroad of New Jersey, which uses the Lehigh and Susquehanna Railroad, Lehigh and Hudson River Railway, and Conrail are major defunct railroads that operated in Easton. Norfolk Southern Railway is now the only railroad in Easton.

=== Media ===
Easton's daily newspaper is The Express-Times. The Morning Call, based in Allentown, also is read in the city. Easton is part of the Philadelphia media market but also receives numerous radio and television channels from New York City and the smaller Scranton-Wilkes-Barre media market to the northwest.

Two television stations are based in the Easton area: PBS member station WLVT Channel 39 in Bethlehem and independent station WFMZ Channel 69 in Allentown.

Five radio stations are based in Easton: WEEX, a sports radio station broadcasting at 1230 AM, WODE-FM "The Hawk", a classic rock station broadcasting at 99.9 FM, WCTO "Cat Country 96", a country music station broadcasting on 96.1 FM, WJRH, a Lafayette College college radio station broadcasting at 104.9 FM, and WEST "Loud Radio", a rhythmic contemporary radio station broadcasting at 99.5 FM. WDIY-FM, a National Public Radio affiliate located in Bethlehem, maintains a translator in Easton and broadcasts at 93.9 FM.

Two national magazines, Runner's World and Bicycling, are based in Easton.

== Telecommunications ==
Easton was once served only by the 215 area code from 1947 when the North American Numbering Plan of the Bell System went into effect until 1994. In response to southeastern Pennsylvania's growing telecommunication demand, Easton telephone exchanges were switched to area code 610 in 1994. An overlay area code, 484, was added to the 610 service area in 1999.

== Infrastructure ==
=== Transportation ===
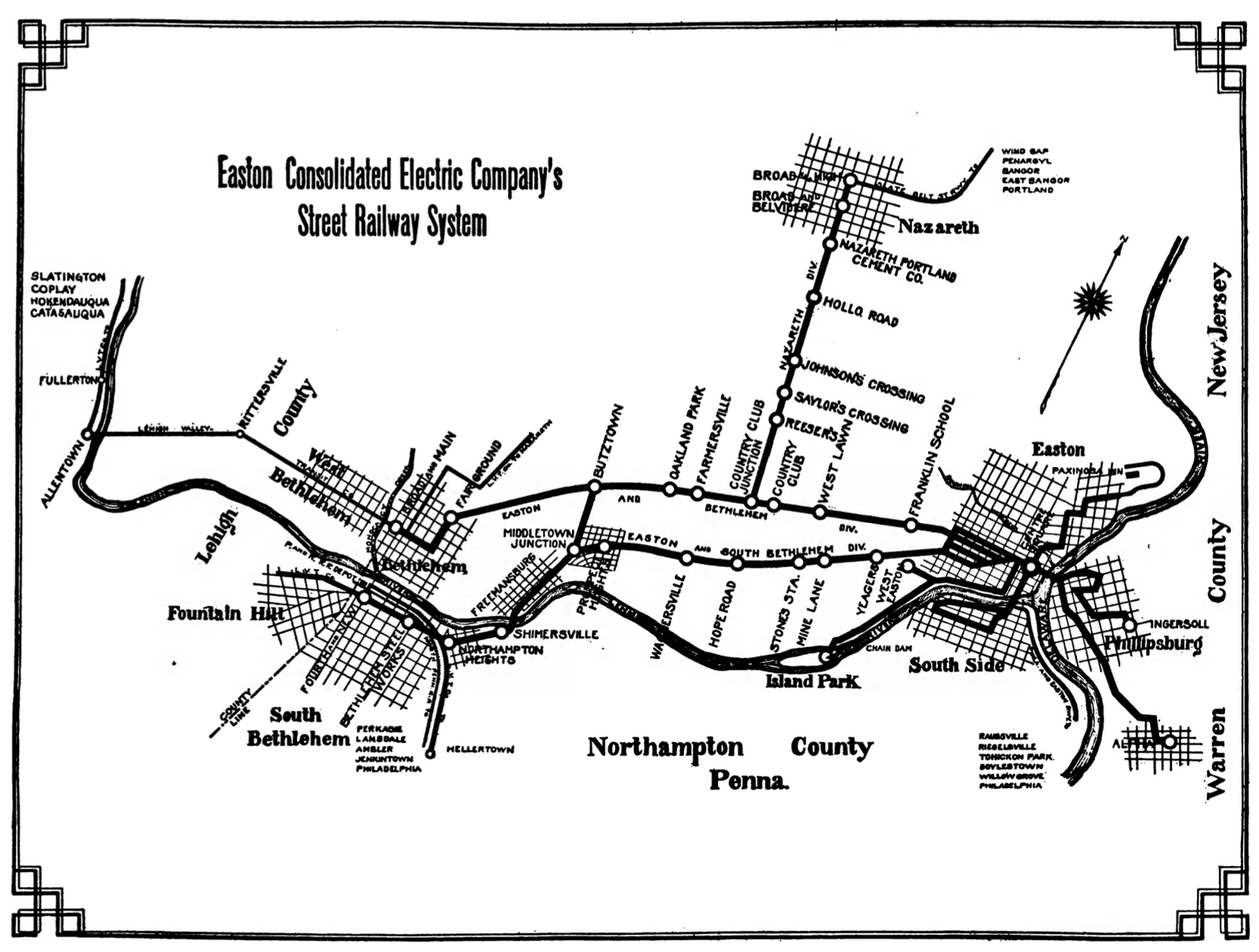
Map of Easton Consolidated Electric Company's Street Railway System, c. 1912

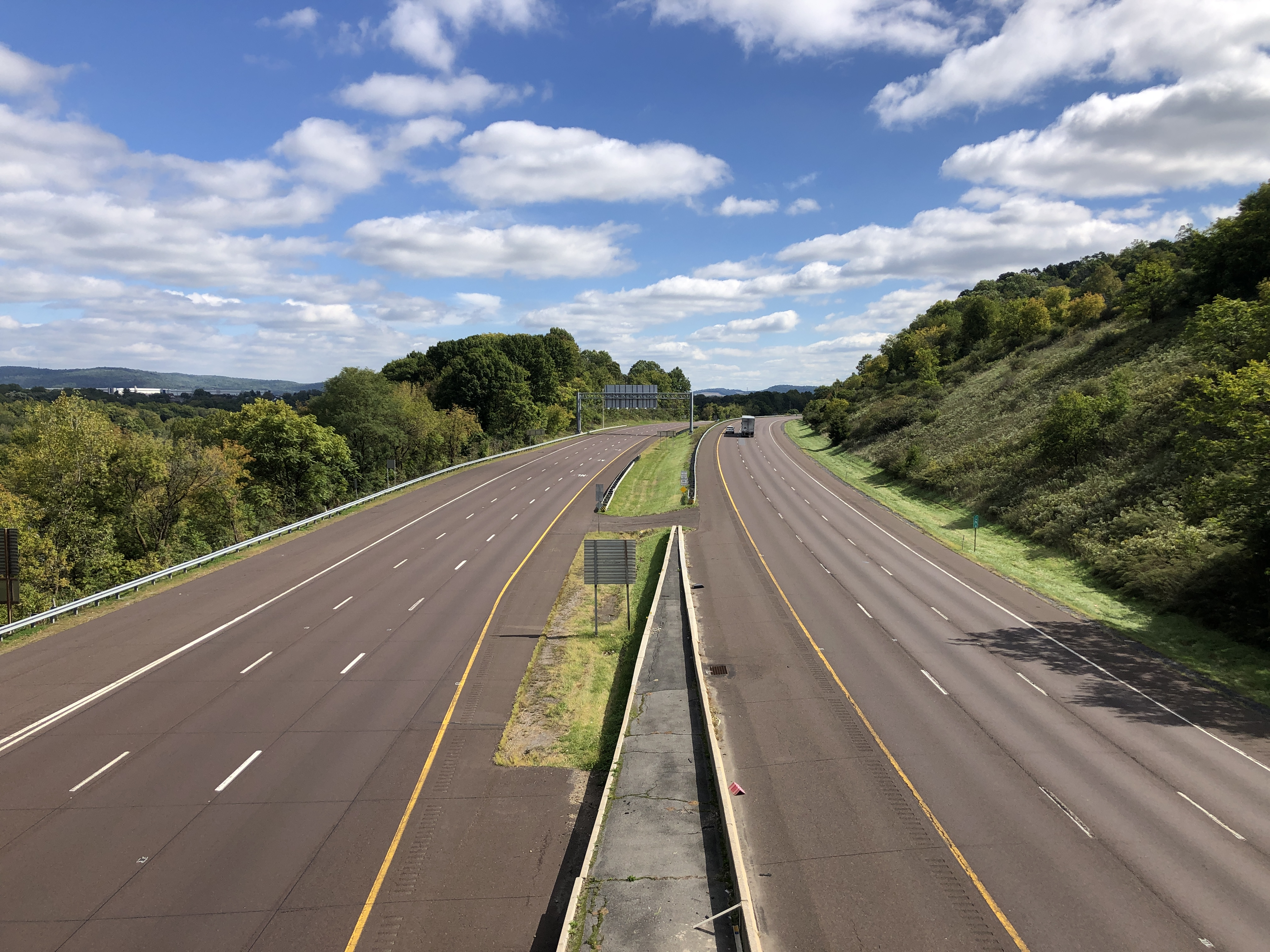
I-78 East in Easton

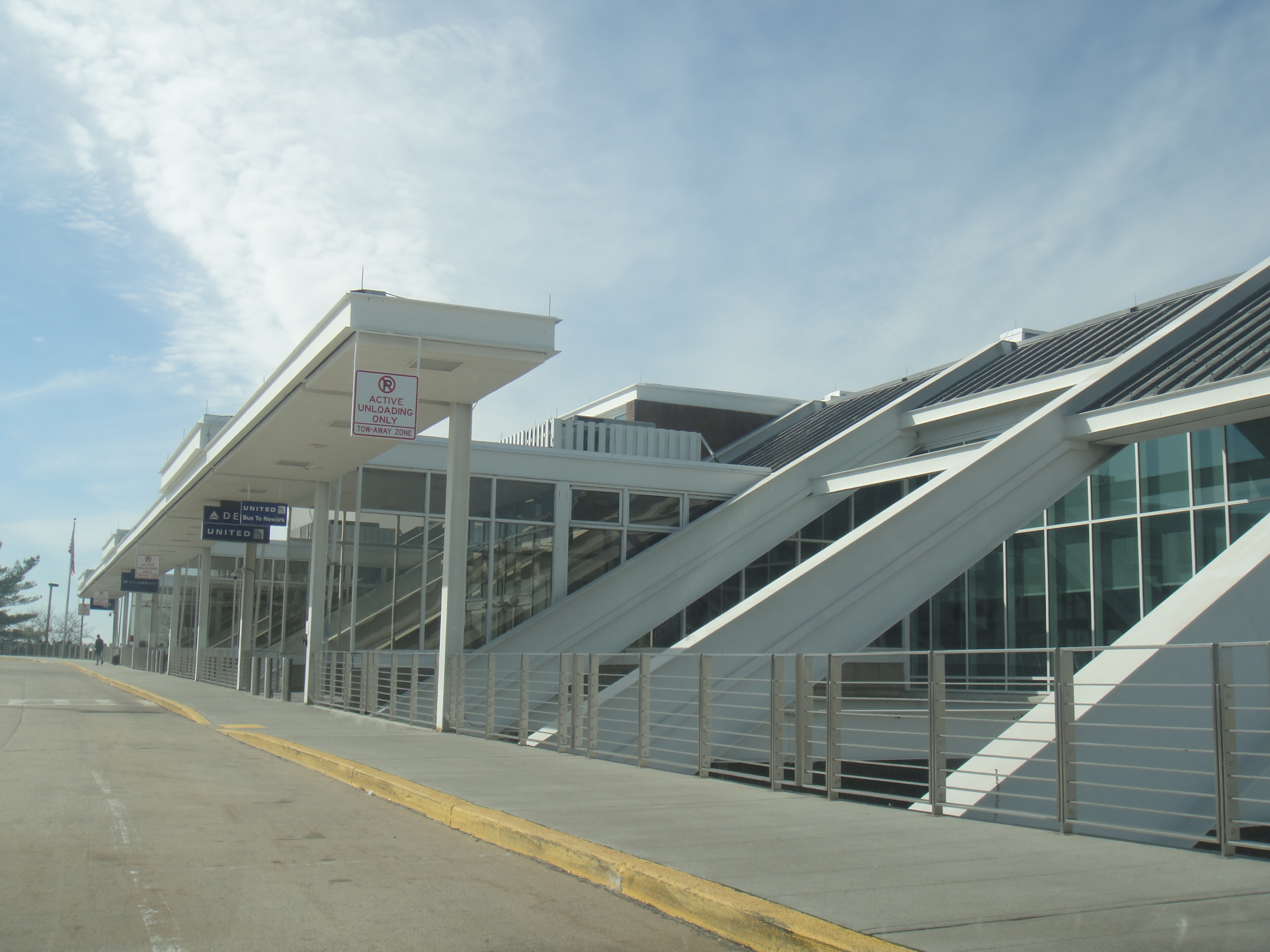
Lehigh Valley International Airport in neighboring Hanover Township, March 2014

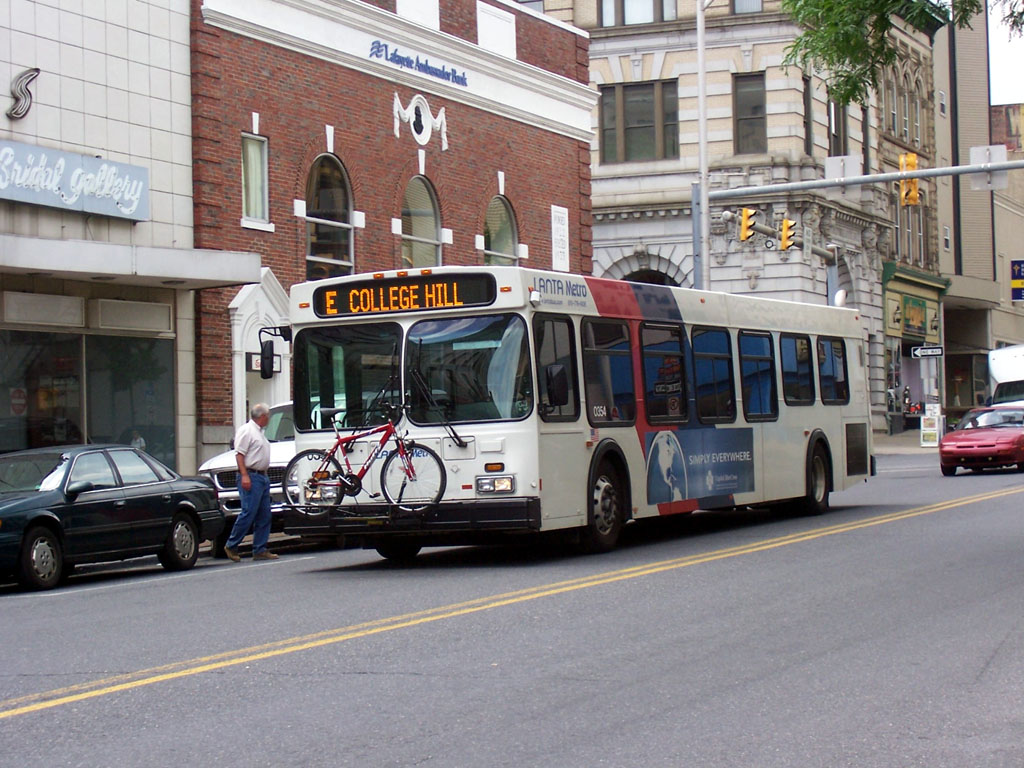
A LANta bus in Easton in June 2005

As of 2017, there were 72.75 miles (117.08 km) of public roads in Easton, of which 13.45 miles (21.65 km) were maintained by the Pennsylvania Department of Transportation (PennDOT) and 59.36 miles (95.53 km) were maintained by the city.

Interstate 78 is the most prominent highway passing through Easton. It briefly passes through the southeastern corner of the city on an east–west alignment, but the nearest interchange is in adjacent Williams Township. U.S. Route 22 is the main highway through central Easton, following the Lehigh Valley Thruway along an east–west alignment. Pennsylvania Route 33 briefly crosses the far southwestern corner of Easton, but the nearest interchange is in Bethlehem Township. Pennsylvania Route 611 follows a north–south route along the east side of the city adjacent to the Delaware River. Finally, Pennsylvania Route 248 begins at the junction of PA 611 and US 22 and heads westward along surface streets.

Major east−west roads (from north to south) in Easton include Corriere Road, Zucksville Road, Northwood Avenue, Lafayette Street, Hackett Avenue, Northampton Street, Butler Street (known as William Penn Highway west of Wilson, then as Easton Avenue nearing Bethlehem), Freemansburg Avenue, and Canal Street. Major north−south roads (from west to east) in Easton include Farmersville Road, Stones Crossing Road, Greenwood Avenue, 25th Street, Bushkill Drive, 13th Street, Centre Street, Sullivan Trail, Richmond Road, 3rd Street (known as Smith Avenue south of the Lehigh River, then as Philadelphia Road farther south), Cattell Street, Riverside Drive, and Delaware Drive (PA Route 611).

Air transport to and from Easton is available through Lehigh Valley International Airport, which is located approximately 11 miles (18 km) west of the city, in Hanover Township. Braden Airpark, also known as Easton Airport, is a smaller airport located about three nautical miles north of Easton's central business district.

Local bus transportation is provided by LANta, which serves Lehigh and Northampton counties. The Easton Intermodal Transportation Center in downtown Easton serves as a hub for LANTA buses. NJ Transit provides bus service from Center Square in Easton to Phillipsburg and Pohatcong in New Jersey along the 890 and 891 routes. Greyhound Lines provides intercity bus service to Easton, stopping at the Easton Intermodal Transportation Center. Trans-Bridge Lines and Uptown Vans provide regular bus service to New York City with Fullington Trailways providing once-daily service to Williamsport and intermediate points.

Easton has no passenger rail service. Until 1983, NJ Transit's Raritan Valley Line terminated at Phillipsburg, across the Delaware River from Easton. The line now terminates at High Bridge, New Jersey, roughly 20 miles (32 km) to the east. Under NJT's I-78 Corridor study, this service would be restored. The former Lehigh Valley Railroad main line, the Lehigh Line, travels through Easton, and is owned by the Norfolk Southern Railway.

=== Utilities ===
Electricity in Easton is provided by Akron, Ohio-based FirstEnergy. Natural gas service in Easton is provided by King of Prussia, Pennsylvania-based UGI Corporation. The city's Public Works department provides water, sewer service, and trash and recycling collection to Easton. Easton's water supply comes from the Delaware River. The city's water is treated at a filtration plant along the Delaware River and then stored in reservoirs and delivered to customers. Easton Suburban Water Authority serves suburban areas outside of Easton and purchases water from the city's Public Works Department. The city's Public Works department contracts with Raritan Valley Disposal for trash and recycling collection in Easton.

== Notable people ==
- Elbern Alkire, inventor of Eharp, a 10-string steel guitar
- Chuck Amato, head football coach, North Carolina State from 2000-2006
- Lisa Ann, adult film actress
- Christian Bauman, novelist
- James McKeen Cattell, first U.S. psychology professor
- Thomas Coates, conductor of Pomp's Cornet Band and the "Father of Band Music in America"
- Jack Coleman, television actor
- Joseph Force Crater, subject of infamous missing person case
- George Daniel, commissioner, National Lacrosse League
- Keno Davis, head basketball coach, Flint United
- Parke H. Davis, college football coach
- Don Dixon, astronomical artist
- Omar Doom, actor and musician
- Michael Flynn, science fiction writer
- Jane Lewers Gray, poet and hymnwriter
- Larry Holmes, former heavyweight boxing champion of the world (fought under nickname "The Easton Assassin")
- Frank Reed Horton, founder of Alpha Phi Omega service fraternity
- Greg Howe, guitar virtuoso
- Chauncey Howell, newscaster and journalist
- Ed Kerns, visual artist
- Daniel Dae Kim, actor, ABC's Lost and CBS's Hawaii Five-0
- Christopher Lennertz, music composer, Alvin and the Chipmunks and Supernatural
- Samuel D. Gross, academic trauma surgeon
- Carolyn Price Horton, bookbinder and conservator
- Andrew Laties, bookseller
- Dennis Mammana, astronomer, author
- Francis March, academic, founder of comparative linguistics
- Peyton C. March, former U.S. Army Chief of Staff
- Kristen McMenamy, fashion model
- Robert B. Meyner, former New Jersey governor
- Mulgrew Miller, jazz pianist
- Phil Mitman, Mayor of Easton (1980-1984) and (2004-2008)
- Randall Munroe, writer, xkcd comic series
- Shalom Tomáš Neuman, visual artist
- Henry Harrison Oberly, Episcopal priest and writer
- Alix Ohlin, novelist
- Jordan Oliver, collegiate and freestyle wrestler, two-time NCAA national champion at Oklahoma State
- Salvatore J. Panto Jr. - Mayor of Easton (1984-1992) and (2008-present)
- William Parsons, surveyor
- James F. Prendergast, state representative
- Chanelle Price, gold medalist, track and field in 800 metres, 2014 IAAF World Indoor Championships
- Frank Pulli, Major League Baseball umpire
- Sally Jessy Raphael, television talk show host
- Andrew Horatio Reeder, former Kansas governor
- Henry Melchior Muhlenberg Richards, American military officer
- William Findlay Rogers, former mayor of Buffalo, New York
- Dee Roscioli, Broadway actress, Elphaba in Wicked
- Alfred A. Schlert, Roman Catholic bishop
- Florence B. Seibert, former biochemist, winner of the Garvan–Olin Medal
- Charles Sitgreaves, former U.S. Congressman
- Samuel Sitgreaves, U.S. Congressman and U.S. commissioner to Great Britain
- Jennie Somogyi, former principal ballet dancer, New York City Ballet
- Peter Stevenson, Gaelic football player
- Karl Stirner, sculptor
- George Taylor, founding father who signed the Declaration of Independence
- Melba Tolliver, WABC TV reporter
- Jim Trimble, former professional football coach, inventor of standard slingshot goalposts
- Lee Upton, poet
- Dave Van Horne, professional baseball broadcaster, Montreal Expos and Florida Marlins
- Jack Wallaesa, professional player, Chicago White Sox and Philadelphia Athletics
- Samuel Wallin, U.S. Congressman
- Bobby Weaver, gold medalist at 1984 Summer Olympics in freestyle wrestling
- Bob Weiss, professional NBA player and coach
- Charles A. Wikoff, most senior-ranking U.S. Army officer killed in Spanish–American War
- Roger Ross Williams, film director, producer and writer, first African American director to win an Oscar
- George Wolf, seventh Governor of the State of Pennsylvania, trustee of Lafayette College, postmaster of Easton

== Events ==
- Baconfest, held first weekend in November
- Easton Garlic Festival, held first weekend in October
- Heritage Day, held in July
- Riverside Festival of the Arts, held in September

== See also ==
- Lenape Nation of Pennsylvania, an unrecognized cultural heritage group based in Easton
