= Vogelsberg =

Mountain range in Hesse

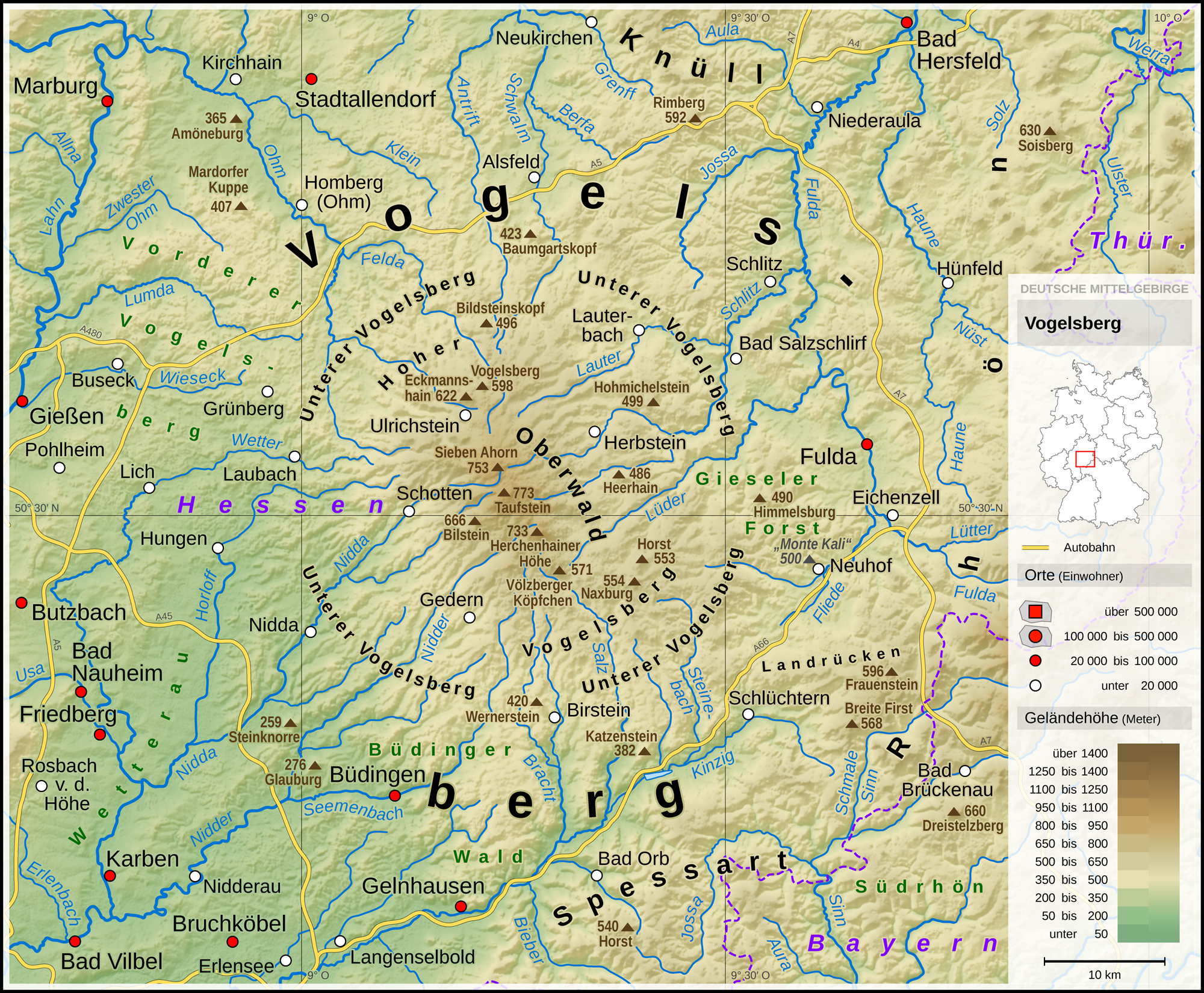
- Overview map of the Vogelsberg

Highest point
- Peak: Taufstein
- Elevation: 773 m above NHN

Dimensions
- Length: 60 km (37 mi)
- Area: 2,500 km^{2} (970 mi^{2})

Geography
- State(s): Counties of Vogelsbergkreis, Main-Kinzig-Kreis, Wetteraukreis, Gießen and Fulda; Hesse, Germany
- Range coordinates: 50°32′00″N 9°14′00″E
- Parent range: East Hesse Highlands

Geology
- Orogenies: Low mountains, extinct volcanoes
- Rock type: Basalt

The Vogelsberg (German pronunciation: [ˈfoːɡl̩sˌbɛʁk]) is a large volcanic mountain range in the German Central Uplands in the state of Hesse, separated from the Rhön Mountains by the Fulda river valley. Emerging approximately 19 million years ago, the Vogelsberg is Central Europe's largest basalt formation, consisting of a multitude of layers that descend from their peak in ring-shaped terraces to the base.

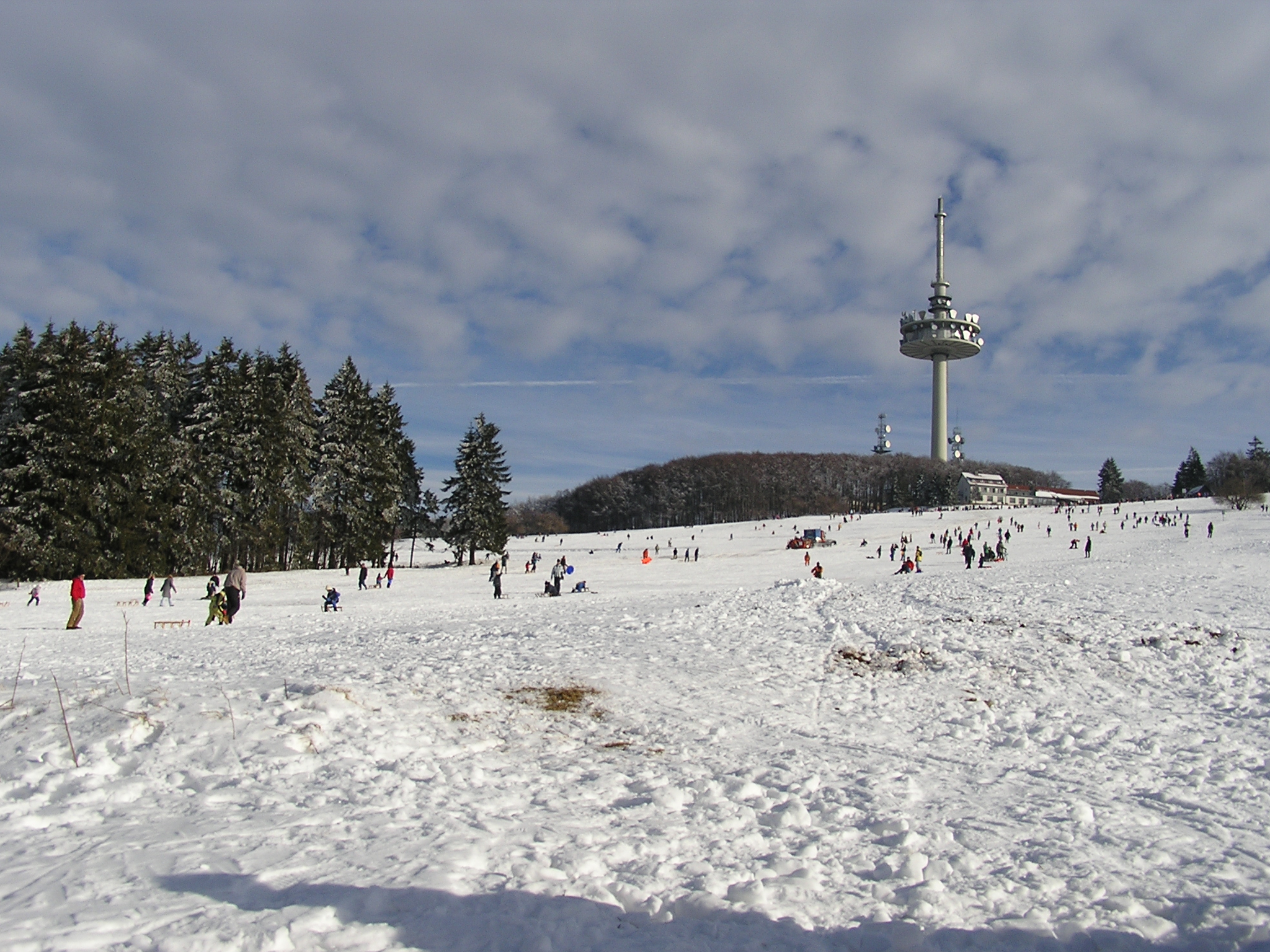
Hoherodskopf

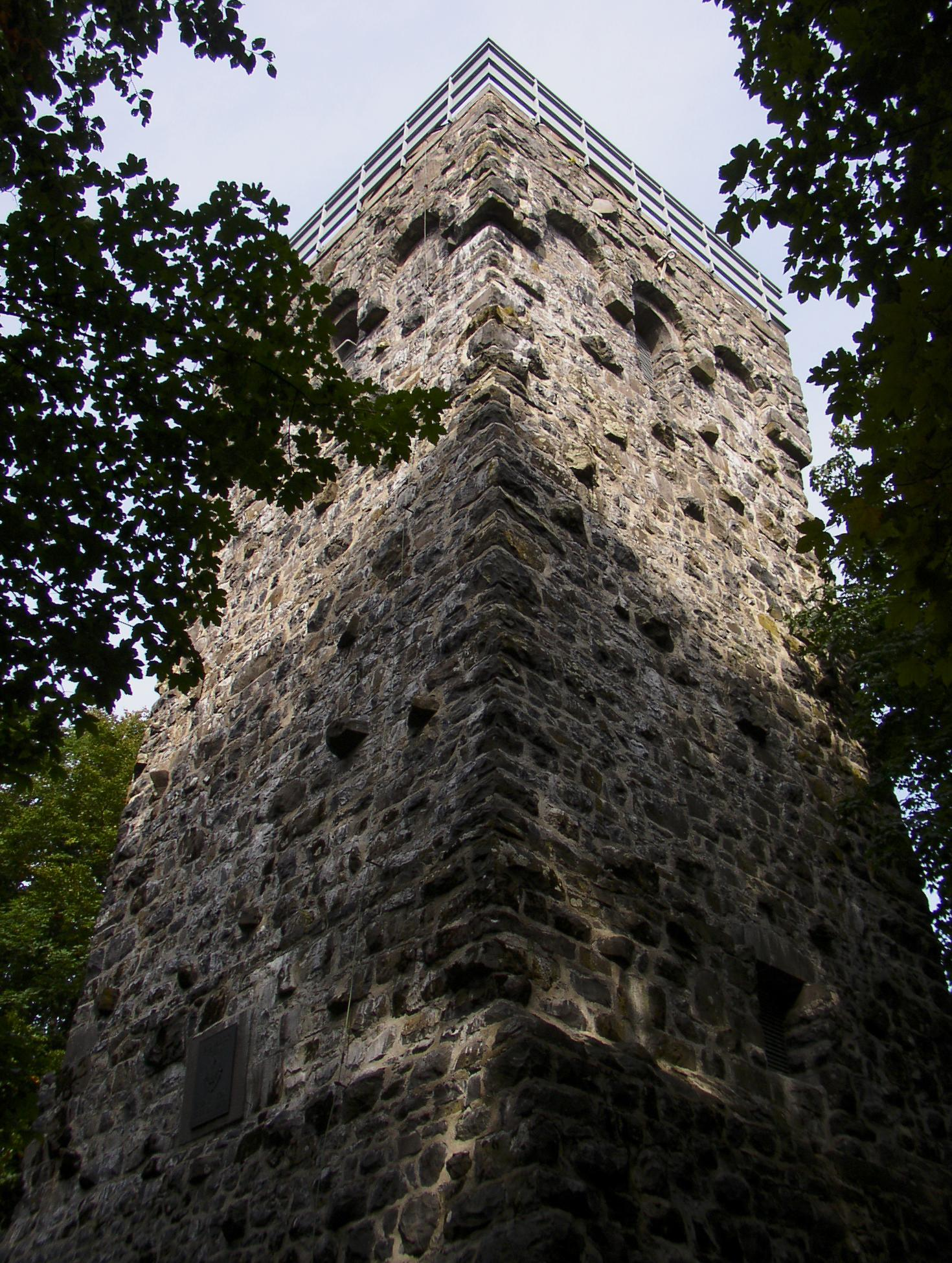
Bismarck tower on the Taufstein

The main peaks of the Vogelsberg are the Taufstein, 773.0 metres (2,536.1 ft), and Hoherodskopf, 763 metres (2,503 ft), both now within the High Vogelsberg Nature Park.

== Location ==
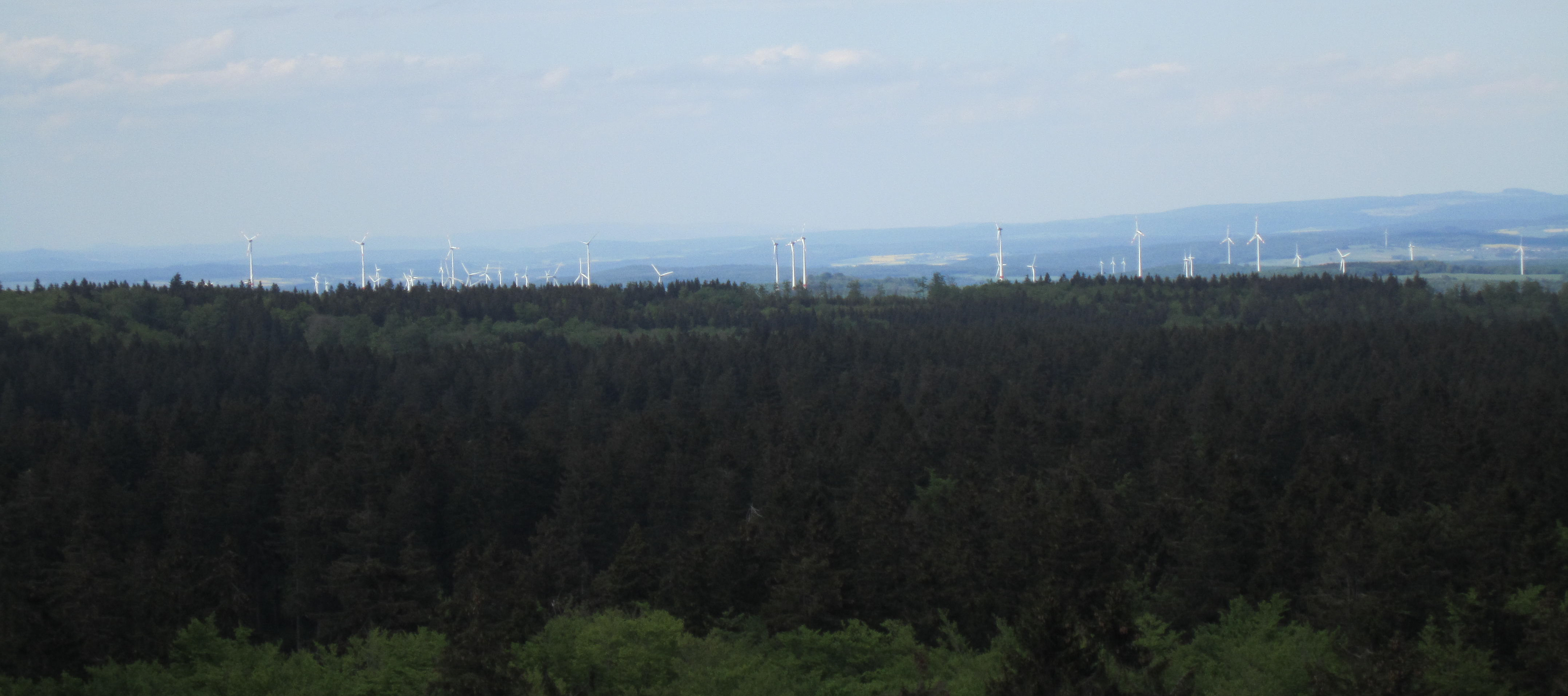
View from the Bismarck Tower on the Taufstein (2015)

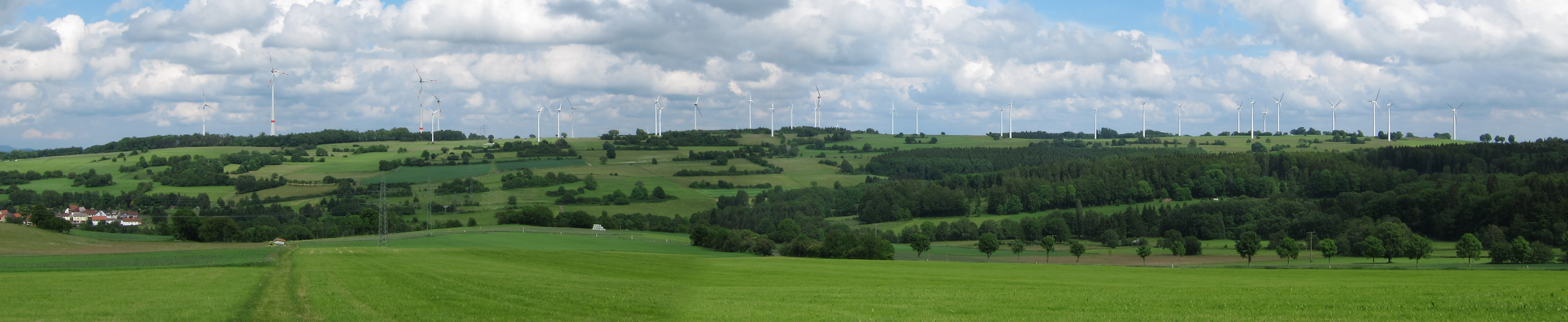
Landscape in the Vogelsberg (2012, Goldener Steinrück).

The Vogelsberg lies in the county of Vogelsbergkreis, around 60 kilometres northeast of Frankfurt between the towns of Alsfeld, Fulda, Büdingen and Nidda. To the northeast is the Knüll, to the east the Rhön, to the southeast the Spessart and to the southwest the low-lying Wetterau, which transitions to the South Hessian lowlands of the Rhine-Main region. In the opposite direction, to the northwest, the Vogelsberg transitions into parts of the West Hesse Highlands, whilst retaining the name, Vogelsberg, and the basalt rocks that bear its name continue well beyond the actual Vogelsberg.

== Geology ==
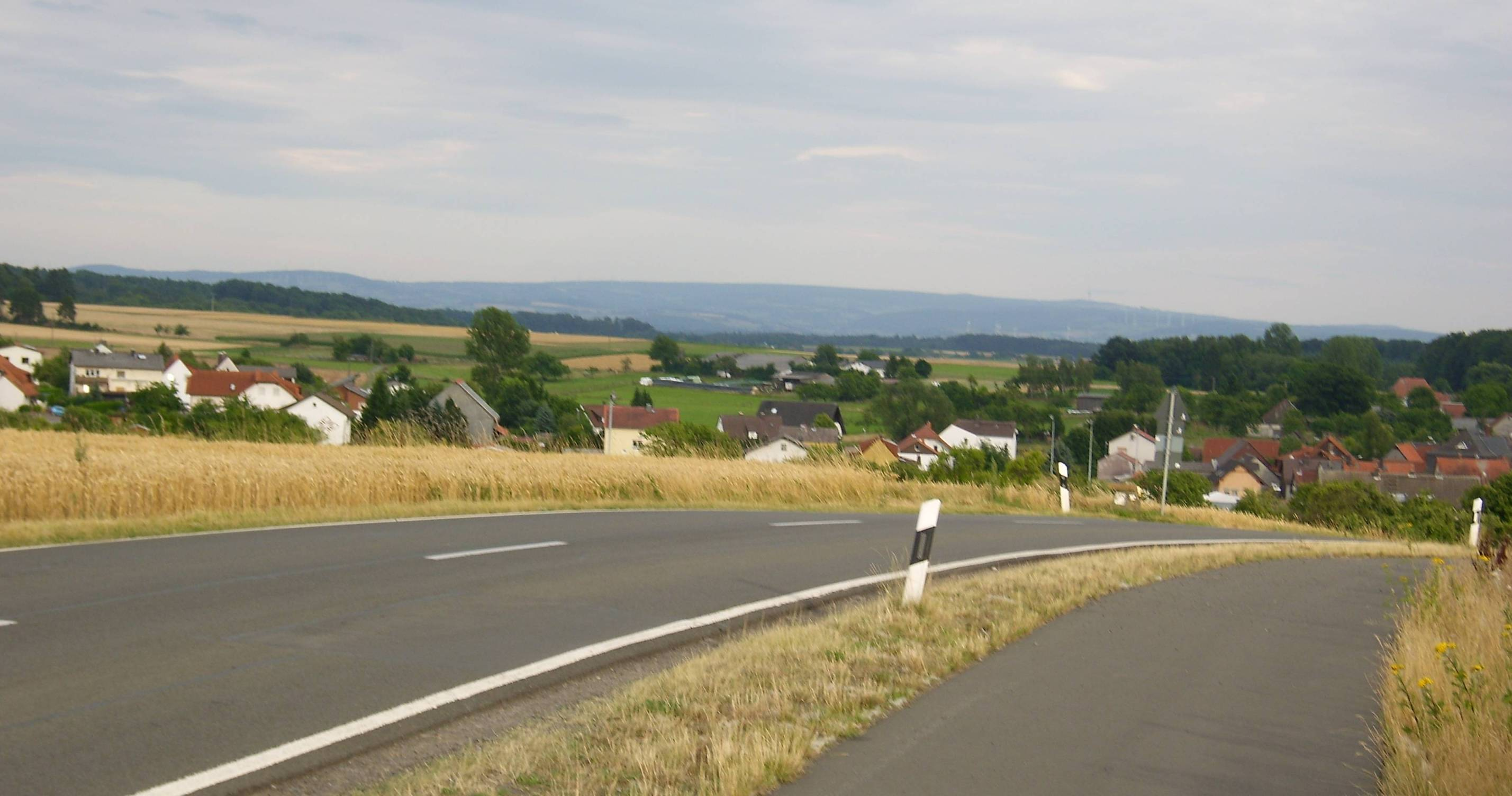
View from the Anterior Vogelsberg between Wermertshausen and Rüddingshausen to the "real" Vogelsberg

The Vogelsberg is the largest contiguous volcanic region in Central Europe with an area of 2,500 square kilometres. It is not a former shield volcano, but comprises many individual volcanoes, which are superimposed. Thus it consists of a multitude of overlapping basalt terraces, which descend from the Oberwald, the high central plateau, 600 to 773 metres high, in series of stepped rings to the edges of the mountain region. Its present appearance, which is reminiscent of a large flat, shield-shaped volcano with a central dome, is the result of an interplay of uplift processes and ablation acting on all sides.

The volcanic activity in the Vogelsberg, as well as that of the North Hessian Volcanic Region to the north which extends as far as Adelebsen in Lower Saxony, is connected with fault block activity that, during the Tertiary, led to the formation of the Lower Hessian Basin. It began in North Hesse about 20 million years ago during the lower Miocene, reached a peak about 13-12 million years ago and came to an end about 7 million years ago, during the upper Miocene. The volcanism of the Vogelsberg was mainly active during the Middle Miocene, according to potassium-argon dating 18.5-10 million years ago, reaching its peak 17-15 million years ago.

As a result of volcanic activity, mainly basaltic lava and pyroclastic deposits were formed. During the course of this volcanicity, trachyte and phonolite were produced in the early stages, then alkali-olivine basalts were deposited, which alternated with tholeiites. These volcanic products overlaid a basement of bunter sandstone and tertiary sands, in small areas in the east also rocks of the muschelkalk and keuper.

Erosion following the Miocene wore away the contiguous basalt nappes, which originally reached as far as the area of the Lower Main, back to isolated deposits in the central complex. Under tropical to subtropical conditions, the volcanic rocks were turned into red clays by lateritic weathering. In many places, red clays collected and bauxite was formed; moreover, the iron contained in basalt was concentrated to form iron ore. These deposits were mined over a long period of time in order to produce raw materials for industry, and the basalt was and still is a highly popular raw material for gravel and natural stone production.

== Natural region divisions ==
The division of the Vogelsberg into individual natural regions is based, on the one hand, on the relief of the mountain range from its highest point towards the outside and, on the other hand, on its river catchments which radiate outwards: the catchments of the Eder (Schwalm), Lower Fulda (Schlitz and Lüder), Main (Kinzig and Nidda) and Lahn (Ohm).

The following natural regions form the Vogelsberg:

- 350 Lower Vogelsberg (Unterer Vogelsberg)
  - 350.1 Northern Lower Vogelsberg (Nördlicher Unterer Vogelsberg)
  - 350.2 Northwestern Lower Vogelsberg (Nordwestlicher Unterer Vogelsberg)
  - 350.3 Eastern Lower Vogelsberg (Östlicher Unterer Vogelsberg)
  - 350.4 Western Lower Vogelsberg (Westlicher Unterer Vogelsberg)
  - 350.5 Southern Lower Vogelsberg (Südlicher Unterer Vogelsberg)
  - 350.6 Giesel Forest (Gieseler Forst)
- 351 High Vogelsberg (Hoher Vogelsberg)
  - 351.0 Western High Vogelsberg (Westlicher Hoher Vogelsberg)
  - 351.1 Eastern High Vogelsberg (Östlicher Hoher Vogelsberg)
  - 351.2 Oberwald

Soils and rocks are, in all parts of the Vogelsberg – with the exception of the Giesel Forest – similar, but average annual temperatures drop noticeably towards the centre of the range (varying by up to 5 K) and the annual precipitation rises towards the Oberwald to an average of 1,200 mm.

The basalt areas of the Vogelsberg continue towards the east and north into its neighbouring natural regions, whilst the Giesel Forest in the east is already on bunter sandstone, like the rest of the natural regions towards the east.

The Vogelsberg massif has stone runs of basalt and tuff, raised bogs and areas of ancient woodland. Numerous hiking trails cross, not only the Oberwald, but also the rest of the area.

=== Oberwald ===
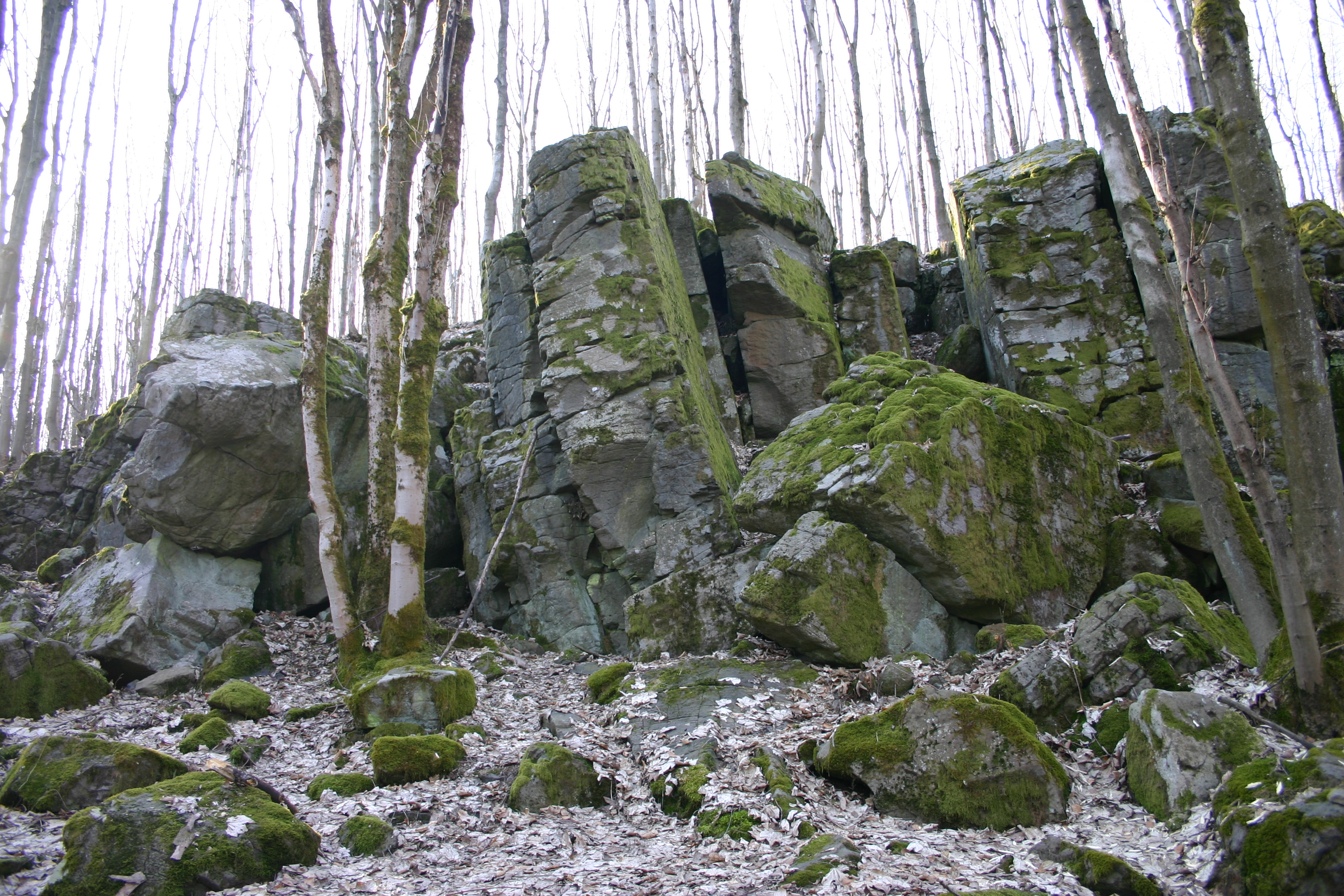
The Uhuklippen natural monument, March 2009

The Oberwald (351.2) is the heart of the Vogelsberg and is entirely wooded; its outer boundary roughly follows the 600 metre contour line. In outer areas of the Vogelsberg, by contrast, there is a tapestry of green pasture, arable fields and woodlands.

Large parts of the Oberwald are protected. For example, the beech wood in the Taufstein Nature Reserve has been left to manage itself since 1906.

On the northern slopes of the Taufstein are large stone runs of basalt.

=== Outer High Vogelsberg ===
The valleys of the Western (351.0) and Eastern (351.1) High Vogelsberg generally lie at heights of over 500 m in the north. In the west, some descend to under 400 m. In the main, the boundaries follow the watersheds of the source region of the most important rivers and especially that of the Rhine-Weser watershed, which runs from southeast to northwest, and the Lahn-Main watershed which heads east.

Because large areas of the original forest were cleared and the precipitation exceeds 1,000 mm per year, snow melt starts early. This and the less porous basalt loam soil frequently leads to flooding.

In this part of the Vogelsberg, the scenery changes in loose succession from woodlands, rich in springs, wetlands, poor grassland and stream valleys; besides there are also a raised bog and, in the southeast a number of waterbodies, the Vogelsberg Lakes (Vogelsberger Seen).

=== Lower Vogelsberg (excluding the Giesel Forest) ===
The basaltic parts of the Lower Vogelsberg (350.1-350.5) range in height between 300 and 500 m, except on the western to southwestern fringes by the Wetterau where they descend below 200 m in places.

Its boundary with the Büdingen Forest to the south, with the Landrücken to the southeast and with the Giesel Forest (see below) to the east is less of a relief feature than the geological transition from basalt to bunter sandstone.

There is also this geological divide with the Fulda-Haune Tableland, which lies in front of the Knüll to the northeast. Between them is the Großenlüder-Lauterbacher Graben. By contrast, in the north, the vulcanite does not end until it reaches the adjacent North Vogelsberg Foreland, i.e. outside the actual Vogelsberg. Even the Anterior Vogelsberg which lies outside the latter region still has large areas of basaltic rock. To the west the basalt zone reaches far into the gently rolling lowlands of the Wetterau, this depression lies alongside the middle and lower reaches of the Horloff river.

From a natural landscape perspective, the region is an island of forest comprising melic grasses and beech.

=== Giesel Forest ===
In the Giesel Forest (350.6), which covers an area of 130 km^{2}, the Vogelsberg pushes eastwards at heights of up to over 500 m to the edge of the Fulda Basin. From a natural region perspective, the only bunter sandstone part of the Vogelsberg is clearly separated from the basaltic areas of the Lower Vogelsberg.

In addition to the woods that cover almost the entire natural region (including pine forests) there are extensive vegetation-free areas by the huge spoil tips of the potassium salt mine near Neuhof.

=== Table of natural regions (with high points) ===
The following table lists the natural regions from the centre outwards and then in clockwise order.

| Designated number | Name | Area [km^{2}] | Rivers | High points with metres (m) above sea level (NHN) (from unless otherwise stated) |
|---|---|---|---|---|
| 351.2 | Oberwald | 37.02 | Only the rivers rising in the centre: Lower Fulda; Schlitz; (all main rivers); Lüder; Schwarza; Nidda; Nidder; Nidda; Ohm; Seenbach and Ilsbach | Taufstein (773.0 m, Rhine-Weser watershed); Hoherodskopf (763.8 m); Sieben Ahorn (752.7 m, Rhine-Weser and Main-Lahn watershed); Herchenhainer Höhe (733.1 m, Rhine-Weser watershed); Geiselstein (ca. 720 m); Nesselberg (ca. 716.2 m); Bilstein (665.5 m) |
| 351.1 | Eastern; High Vogelsberg | 153.72 | Lower Fulda; Schlitz; Lüder; Fliede; (only Kemmete); Kinzig; Steinebach (Steinaubach); Salz; Bracht; Nidda; Seemenbach; Nidder | Völzberger Köpfchen (570,8 m), Rhine-Weser watershed; Naxburg (553.6 m), Rhine-Weser watershed; Horst (553.3 m) |
| 351.0 | Western; High Vogelsberg | 136.47 | Nidda; Nidda; Horloff; Wetter; Ohm; (Schwalm) | Eckmannshain (622.0 m); Schlossberg (609.7 m) and Ulrichstein Castle; Vogelsberg (Feldatal) (598.0 m); Goldner Steinrück (578.1 m) |
| 350.5 | Southern; Lower Vogelsberg | 259.32 | Kinzig; Steinebach (Steinaubach); Ulmbach; Salz; Bracht; Nidda; only Seemenbach | Wernerstein (420 m); Apfelberg (419 m); Galgenberg (393 m), western boundary with the Western Lower Vogelsberg; Katzenstein (382 m), southern boundary with the Büdingen Forest |
| 350.4 | Western; Lower Vogelsberg | 387.72 | Nidda; Nidder; Nidda; Horloff; Wetter | Galgenberg (393 m), eastern boundary with the Southern Lower Vogelsberg; Lehnkopf (358 m); Eschberg (328 m); Steigbügel (298 m), western boundary with the Wetterau; Hubberg (289 m), western boundary with the Wetterau; Steinknorre (259 m), eastern boundary with the Büdingen Forest in the extreme south |
| 350.2 | Northwestern; Lower Vogelsberg | 154.63 | Ohm | Bildsteinskopf (496 m), eastern boundary with the Northern Lower Vogelsberg; Bildstein (398 m); Kretenberg (384 m), northern boundary with the Northern Vogelsberg Foreland, Rhine-Weser watershed |
| 350.1 | Northern; Lower Vogelsberg | 69.61 | Schwalm | Bildsteinskopf (496 m), western boundary with the Northwestern Lower Vogelsberg; Baumgartskopf (423 m), northern boundary with the West Hesse Depression |
| 350.3 | Eastern; Lower Vogelsberg | 245.32 | (Schwalm); Lower Fulda; Schlitz; Lüder; Fliede; (only left tributaries) | Mühlberg (486 m); Heerhain (486 m) |
| 350.6 | Giesel Forest | 128.96 | Lower Fulda; Lüder (right-hand lower tributaries); Giesel; Fliede (left tributaries) | Knöschen (508.7 m), boundary with the Eastern Lower Vogelsberg on the southeastern edge of the forest; Himmelsberg (489.7 m) |

== Drainage and water supply ==
Not only does a section of the Rhine-Weser watershed run over the Vogelsberg, but also (within the Weser and Fulda systems) the watersheds between the Eder and Schwalm and Lower Fulda as well as (within the Rhine basin) that between the Main and the Lahn.

Groundwater and spring water from the Vogelsberg, along with water from the dem Spessart hills and Hessian Ried provides drinking water for the Rhine-Main region. As early as 1876 were springs in the eastern Vogelsberg enclosed for that purpose and the construction of water pipes from the Spessart and the Vogelsberg to the city of Frankfurt. A lack of understanding of the particular hydrogeological and ecological situation in the Vogelsberg and excessive withdrawal resulted in springs drying up, cracks appearing in buildings and subsidence of the ground. The Upper Hessian Water Companies (Oberhessischen Versorgungsbetriebe AG, OVAG) are the largest water suppliers in the Vogelsberg: they pump out around 30 million cubic metres of ground water annually from their wells; about 2/3 goes to the city of Frankfurt in the Rhine-Main region.

=== Rivers and streams ===
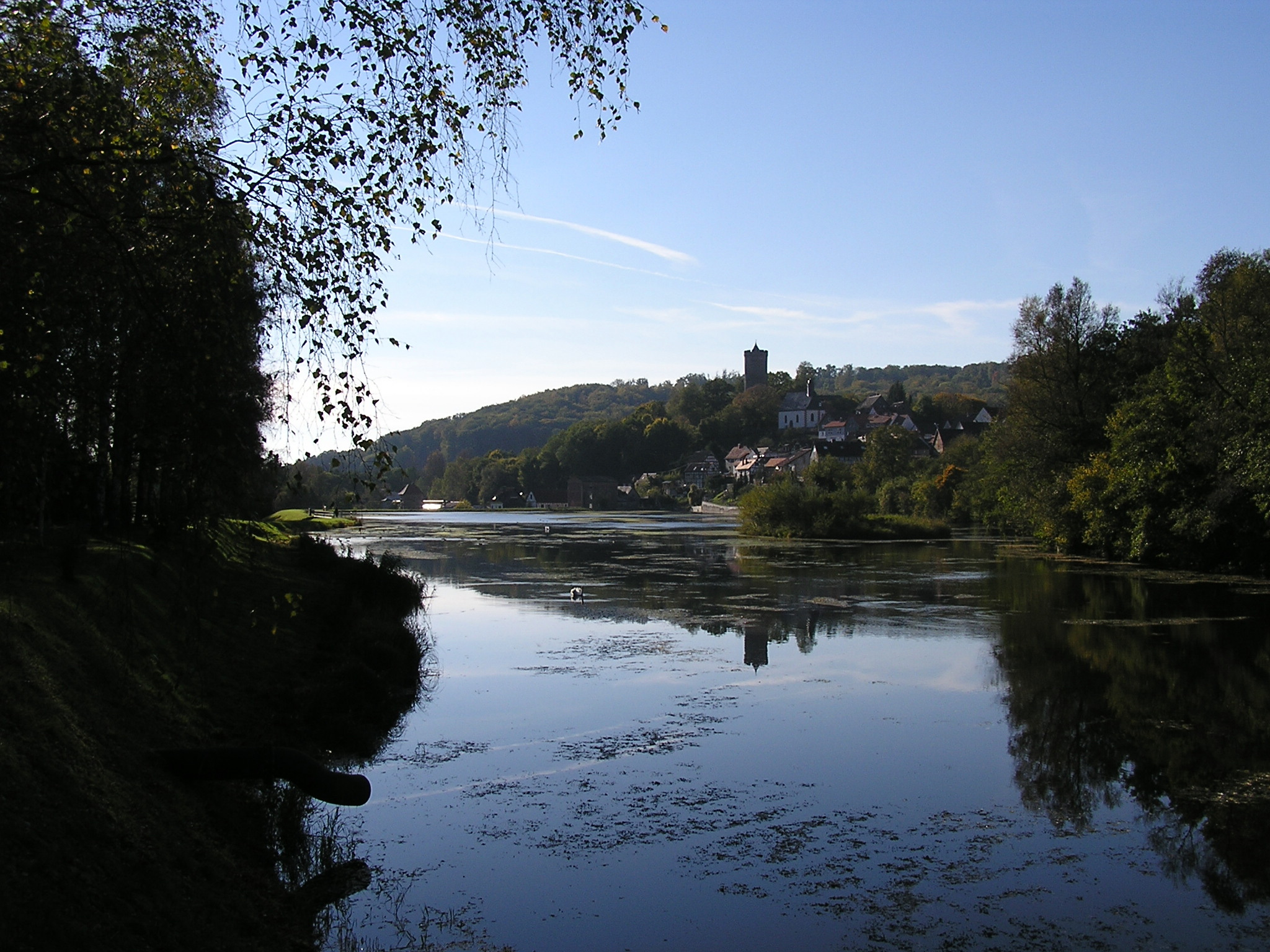
The Nidder in the Vogelsberg

Numerous rivers and streams rise in the Vogelsberg, and flow radially from its highest point in all directions of the compass. In clockwise order, the rivers of the main catchments are the Schwalm, Lower Fulda, Kinzig, Nidda and Ohm. Often a well known river is fed by several almost equal tributaries.

==== The most important rivers systematically ====
The main rivers of the Vogelsberg, in clockwise order starting in the north, are:

- Fulda
  - Schwalm (97.1 km)
    - Antrift (38.6 km)
    - Obere Schwalm
  - Untere Fulda
    - Schlitz (43.3 km)
      - Lauter (27.9 km)
        - Brenderwasser
        - Lauter
        - Eisenbach
      - Altefeld (30.0 km)
        - Alte Hasel
        - Altefeld
    - Lüder (36.4 km)
      - Schwarza
      - Lüder
      - Moosbach
      - Jossa
    - Giesel (7.2 km)
    - Fliede (22,1 km)
      - Kemmete
      - Upper Fliede
- Main
  - Kinzig (86.0 km)
    - Steinebach (Steinaubach) (23.2 km)
    - Ulmbach (13.4 km)
    - Salz (29.8 km)
    - Bracht (31.5 km)
  - Nidda (89.7 km)
    - Seemenbach (37.4 km)
    - Nidder (68.6 km)
    - Nidda
    - Horloff (44.5 km)
    - Wetter (68.8 km)
- Lahn
  - Ohm (59.0 km)
    - Seenbach
    - Ilsbach
    - Ohm
    - Felda

In the Vogelsberg the following lengths are misleading, however:

- The Schwalm takes only a fraction of its water from the Vogelsberg and is fed inter alia by the Knüll and Kellerwald.
- The Fliede is only fed from the left by the Vogelsberg, while its right tributaries come from the Rhön and Landrücken.
- The Kinzig itself does not flow at all through the range. Only its important right-hand tributaries come from the Vogelsberg, while e. g. its left-hand branches rise in the Spessart.
- In the Nidda river system the Wetter leaves the Vogelsberg shortly after its source and obtains water from inter alia the Taunus; even the Horloff soon leaves the Vogelsberg and from then on only forms its eastern boundary.
- In its middle reaches, the Ohm is fed inter alia by the Kellerwald.

=== Waterbodies ===
Among the water bodies of the Vogelsbergs are the following lakes and reservoirs (sorted alphabetically):

- Antrift Reservoir
- Gederner See
- Nidda Reservoir
- Mooser Teiche
- Storage basin of the Nidder Power Station

== Wildlife ==
In recent years the Eurasian lynx has returned. There are rumors about wolves being sighted in the region. Sightings have been confirmed in an area north of the Vogelsberg. Wildcats are also said to exist in the region, although they, like lynxes, are notoriously hard to spot. As in most of Hesse, wild boar are present in large numbers.

== Tourism ==
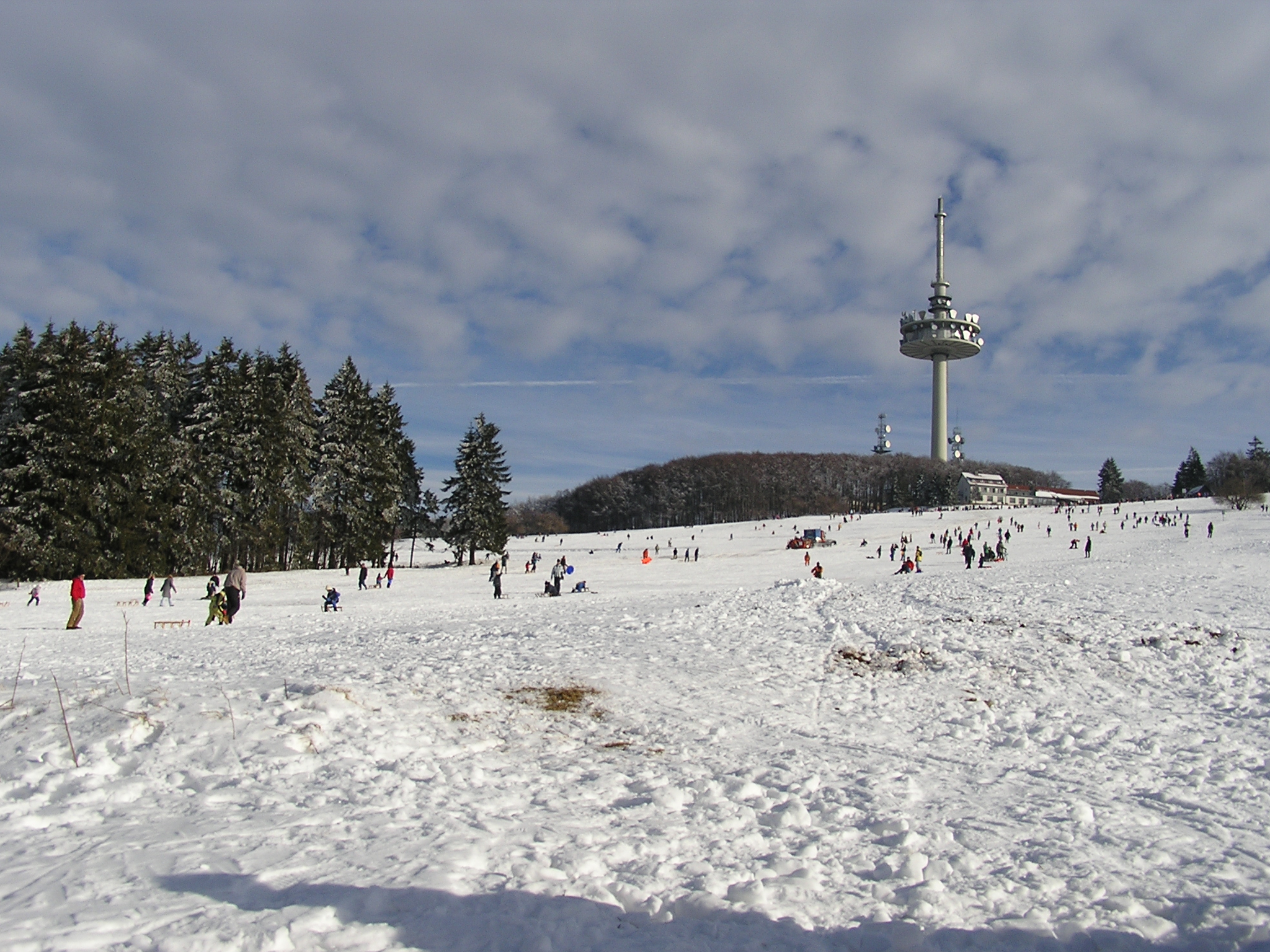
Winter sports on the Hoherodskopf

The Vogelsberg is known for its winter sports areas on the Herchenhainer Höhe and Hoherodskopf (Alpine skiing and 55 km of loipes).

In summer, apart from hiking, cycling is well catered for on the numerous long-distance cycling routes such as the Volcano Cycleway (Vulkanradweg, Vogelsberg Southern Railway Cycleway (Vogelsberger Südbahnradweg ...). Moreover, there are regular RMV buses, the so-called Vulkan Express running from Büdingen, Stockheim, Nidda, Hungen, Mücke and Schlitz via Lauterbach at weekends to the heights of the Vogelsberg. These buses are equipped with bicycle trailers. The majority of bus routes run to the Hoherodskopf and so may be used in combination.

The Volcano and Southern Railway Cycleways are tarmacked and may also be used by inline skaters. There is a large network of signposted cycleways in and around the Vogelsberg Nature Fitness Park around the highest summits and also 70 km of signed mountain bike routes.

The Hoherodskopf is the tourism centre of the region. Located here are the Nature Conservation Information Centre for the High Vogelsberg Nature Park and a tourist information centre for the town of Schotten, which are open daily all year-round. From this point, three nature trails have been set up, covering the fields of geology, nature and sensory perception. There is a summer toboggan run, a tree ropes course, numerous hiking trails and several restaurants.

== Literature ==
- There is literature about Vogelsberg in the Hessian Bibliography
- Georg Eurich (2000), Der Vogelsberg im Herzen Deutschlands (in German), Gudensberg-Gleichen: Wartberg Verlag, ISBN 3-86134-938-8
- Wilhelm Schottler: Der Vogelsberg. Notizblatt der Hessischen Geologischen Landesanstalt zu Darmstadt, V. Folge, 18. Heft. Darmstadt 1937, OCLC 634810652.
- Sparkassen-Kulturstiftung Hessen-Thüringen, ed. (2009), Kulturelle Entdeckungen Main-Kinzig-Kreis, Vogelsbergkreis, Wetteraukreis (in German), Regensburg: Schnell & Steiner, ISBN 978-3-7954-2189-2
- Roland Walter; et al. (1992), Geologie von Mitteleuropa (in German) (5. ed.), Stuttgart: Schweizerbart’sche Verlagsbuchhandlung, p. 334, ISBN 3-510-65149-9
- Fritz Wolff: Wetterau und Vogelsberg in alten Landkarten = Geschichte und Kultur in Wetterau und Vogelsberg 2. Friedberg [1994].
