= Giesel =

Giesel may refer to:

- Giesel (Fulda), a river of Hesse, Germany, tributary of the Fulda
- Giesel (Neuhof), a village of the municipality Neuhof, Hesse, Germany
- Giesel Forest, a region of the mountain range Vogelsberg, Hesse, Germany
- Friedrich Oskar Giesel (1852–1927), known as Fritz Giesel, German organic chemist
