= Saurode =

River in Germany

Location
- Country: Germany
- States: Hesse

Physical characteristics
- Mouth
  - location: Gresel
  - coordinates: 50.5193°N 9.6354°E

Basin features
- Progression: Gresel→ Giesel→ Fulda→ Weser→ North Sea

Saurode is a small river of Hesse, Germany. It flows into the Gresel in Fulda-Zell.

== See also ==
- List of rivers of Hesse
