= Hauswurz =

- Village of Neuhof
- Interactive map of Hauswurz
- Location within Germany Location within Hesse
- Coordinates: 50°27′46″N 09°28′33″E
- Country: Germany
- State: Hesse
- Admin. region: Kassel
- District: Fulda
- Municipality: Neuhof
- Elevation: 414 m (1,358 ft)

Population (2011)
  - Total: 870
- Time zone: UTC+01:00 (CET)
  - Summer (DST): UTC+02:00 (CEST)
- Postal codes: 36119
- Dialling codes: 06669

Hauswurz is a village in Hesse, Germany. Part of the Neuhof municipality, it is 17 km southwest of Fulda and ca. 70 km northeast of Frankfurt.

== Location ==
Hauswurz is located on the upper course of the stream Kemmete (which flows east from the nearby Vogelsberg Mountains) between Weidenau (in the Freiensteinau municipality, to the west) and Rommerz (in Neuhof, to the east). To the north is Brandlos, the southernmost village of the neighboring municipality Hosenfeld. Landesstraßen 3141 and 3181 intersect in Hauswurz.

== History ==
Hauswurz is first mentioned between 1090 and 1150, in the Codex Eberhardi, a manuscript from the Fulda monastery; its name is given as Huswartes, and it belongs to the monastery of Petersberg. Local officials date the town's origin to 1165. In 1972, during municipal reorganization in Hesse, it was placed in the municipality of Neuhof. An early 20th-century plan to connect Hauswurz to Fulda via narrow-gauge railway was aborted. While neighboring cities and villages were hit by bombs from Allied planes during World War II, Hauswurz was one of only two villages in the area where military engagement with American troops led to extensive destruction. A memorial by the church commemorates the destruction of Hauswurz on 31 March 1945.
