= Gilgbach =

River in Germany

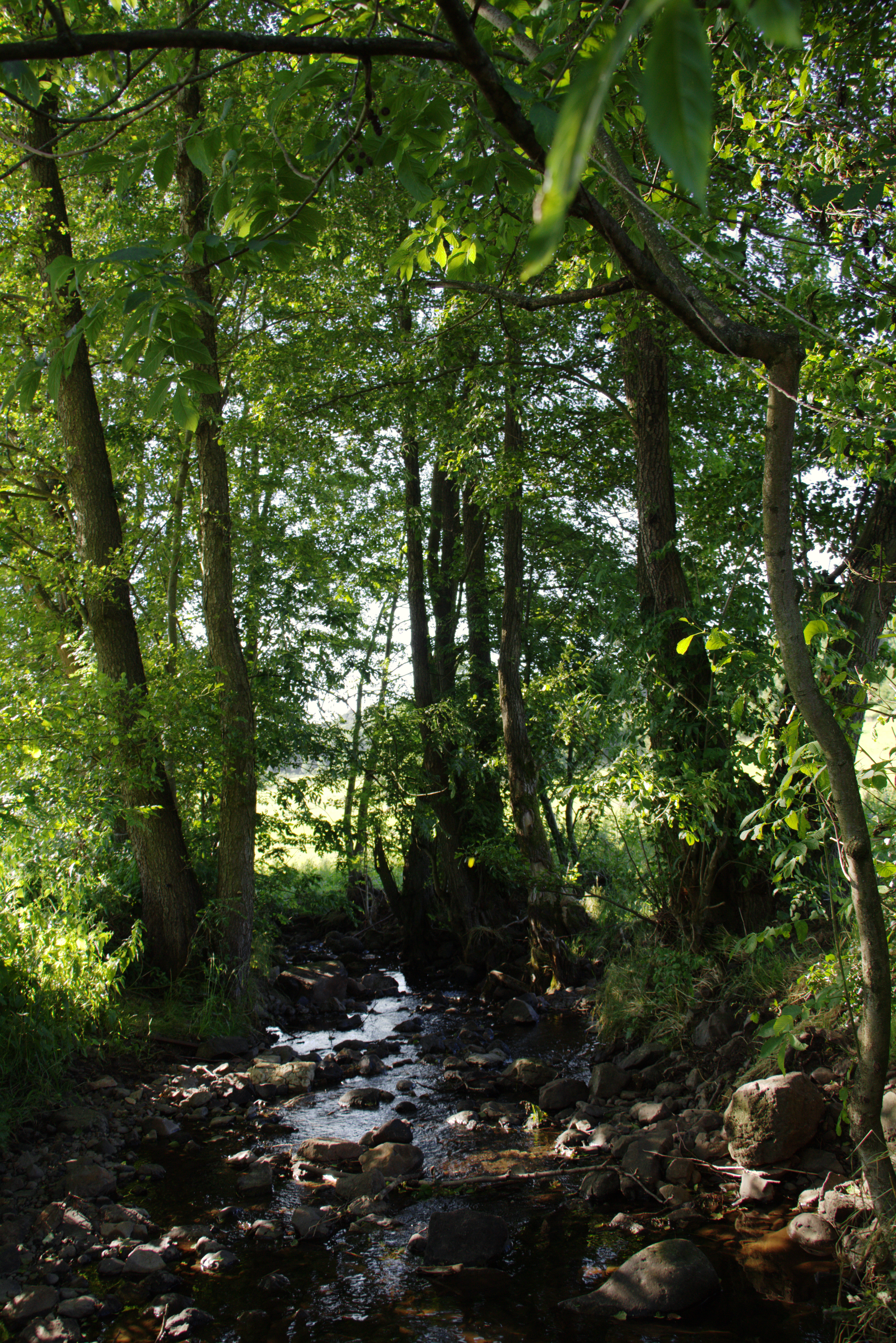

Location
- Country: Germany
- State: Hesse

Physical characteristics
- Mouth
  - location: Ilsbach
  - coordinates: 50.6097°N 9.0669°E
- Length: 15.5 km (9.6 mi)

Basin features
- Progression: Ilsbach→ Seenbach→ Ohm→ Lahn→ Rhine→ North Sea

Gilgbach is a river of Hesse, Germany. It flows into the Ilsbach near Mücke.

== See also ==
- List of rivers of Hesse
