= Josa (disambiguation) =

JOSA refers to the Journal of the Optical Society of America.

Josa is a municipality in Aragon, Spain.

Josa may also refer to:

- Josa de Cadí, a village in Josa i Tuixén, Catalonia, Spain
- Josa, a genus of spiders in the family Anyphaenidae
- a personal name:
  - Mirel Josa (born 1963), Albanian football player and coach
  - Josa Lee (1911–1967), Irish hurler
  - Josaline "Josa" Enriquez-Valencia, a character from Abot-Kamay na Pangarap

== See also ==
- Isabel de Josa (1508–1575), Catalan writer
- La Josa (born 1976), Mexican singer and athlete
- Jossa (disambiguation)
- Josa in Korean postpositions
