= Herchenhainer Höhe =

Mountain in Hesse, Germany

Coordinates: 50°29′N 9°17′E

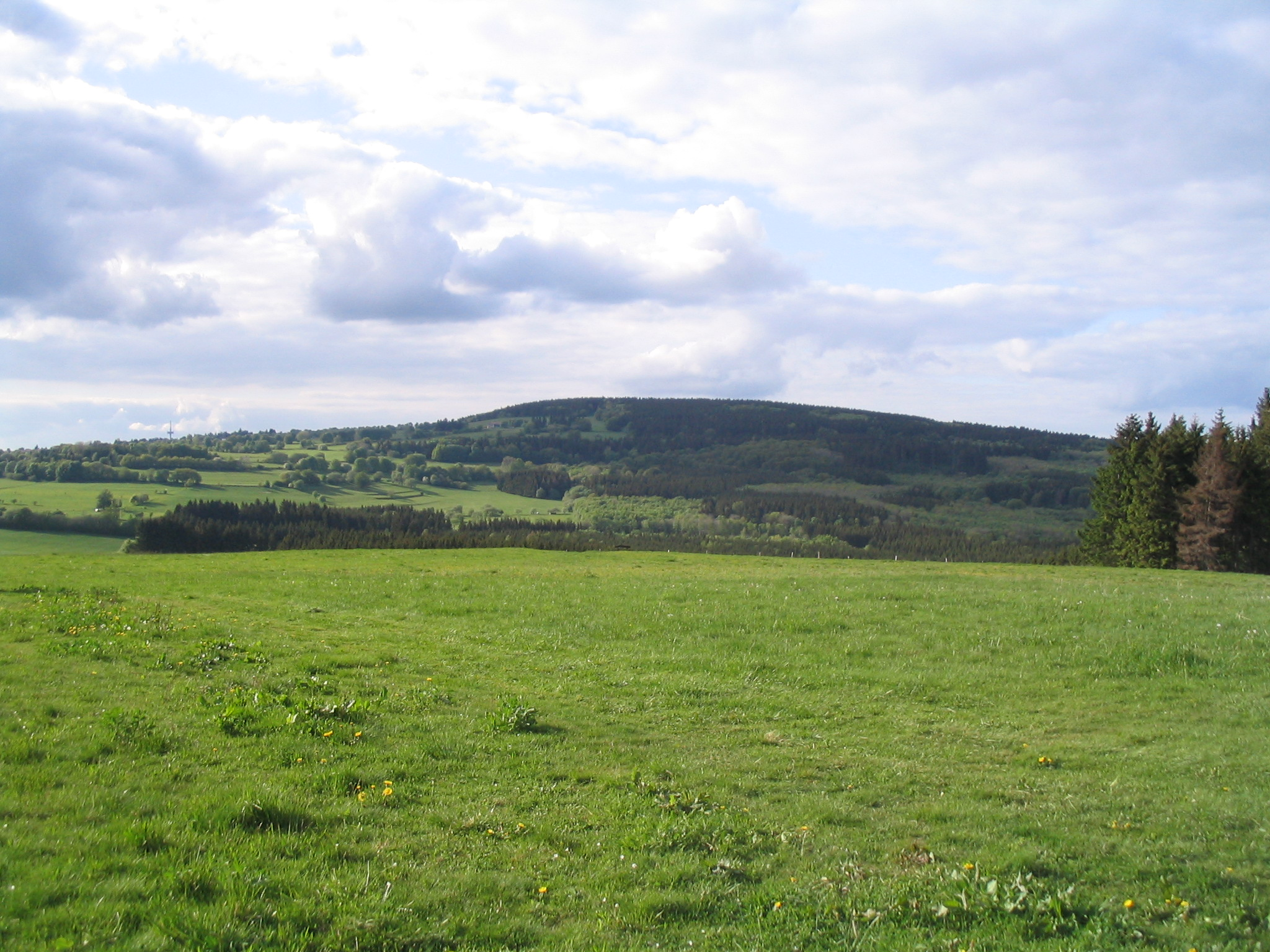
- Herchenhainer Höhe

Highest point
- Elevation: 733 m (2,405 ft)

Geography
- Location: Hesse, Germany

Herchenhainer Höhe is a mountain of Hesse, Germany. It has the fourth highest peak of the Vogelsberg range. It contributes to the watersheds of the Rhine and Wetter rivers.

The Herchenhainer Höhe, at 733.1 meters above sea level, is the fourth highest mountain in the Vogelsberg region of Hesse, Germany. The Taufstein, the highest peak in the Vogelsberg, is located four kilometers to the northwest.

The Herchenhainer Höhe is located in the municipality of Grebenhain, about four kilometers west of the town by the same name and about 800 meters north-northeast of the center of the village of Herchenhain. The Rhine-Weser watershed runs across its summit. The southwestern slopes are part of the source area of the Nidder, which flows into the Wetterau region, while the northern and eastern slopes are part of the watershed area of the Fulda tributaries Schlitz and Lüder, respectively. The summit and the northeastern slopes are densely forested, while the southwestern slopes are used for agriculture.

In 1885, an observation platform approximately 10 meters high was installed, which collapsed around 1900. By 1906, completed plans for the taller, stone Ernst-Ludwig Tower were already in place. A restaurant serving beer from a brewery, which was supposed to cover part of the investment costs, was also planned. However, since the financier backed out, the investment never materialized.

In 1926, the Vogelsberg Hiking Club built a youth hostel called the Vater-Bender-Heim. In the early 1930s, regular glider flights even took place on the Herchenhainer Höhe. A bomb strike destroyed the youth hostel in 1941. At the end of the 1950s, the then Lauterbach district council built the Bergrasthaus, a hotel that was classified as a 3-star establishment at the time. The two-lane access road, which still exists today, was constructed to reach the hotel.

The nature-oriented mountain meadow trail is now a circular hiking route. There is also a snack station near the summit.

Since 2023, the municipality of Grebenhain had planned to erect a multi-functional observation tower on the hilltop. This project involved a collaboration with the regional energy supplier OVAG, with the intention that the tower would also serve as a connection point to the nationwide 450 MHz radio network. In 2024, these plans were abandoned because a multi-functional tower proved financially infeasible. Now, a mast purely for transmission is being erected on the Herchenhainer Höhe.

The view from the mountaintop, under very good visibility conditions, extends from the Dreistelzberg in the southeast, across the Spessart mountains in the south, to the Odenwald and, in the southwest, even as far as the Donnersberg, 136 kilometers away. To the west, the view stretches across the Wetterau region to the Großer Feldberg and the Pferdskopf in the Taunus mountains. The Dünsberg is visible to the northwest.

On the summit, the Vogelsberg Heights Club (VHC) erected a monument in 1926 with the inscription "TO ITS FALLEN MEMBERS, THE V. H. C." on a bronze plaque. A small ski area with a ski lift is located on the southeast slope of the Herchenhainer Höhe.
