= Gresel =

River in Germany

Location
- Country: Germany
- States: Hesse

Physical characteristics
- Mouth
  - location: Giesel
  - coordinates: 50.5177°N 9.6482°E

Basin features
- Progression: Giesel→ Fulda→ Weser→ North Sea

Gresel is a river in the state of Hesse, Germany. The Giesel is a left tributary of the Fulda River, approximately 10 km long, which originates in the Giesel district at an elevation of 409 meters above sea level. Its main upper course, also referred to as Gresel, along with its left tributary Saurode and its right tributary, also named Giesel, drains roughly the eastern half of the Gieseler Forst, a large contiguous forested area covering 4,259.6 hectares in the eastern part of the Lower Vogelsberg and west of the Fulda Basin.

The Giesel flows into the Fulda in the northern part of the Fulda district of Bronnzell, north of and near the Kohlhauser Bridge at Kohlhaus, a sandstone bridge spanning 215 meters and supported by more than ten vaults. The river’s longitudinal profile exhibits a total elevation difference of 156 meters from its source to its confluence with the Fulda.

== See also ==
- List of rivers of Hesse
