= Altefeld =

River in Germany

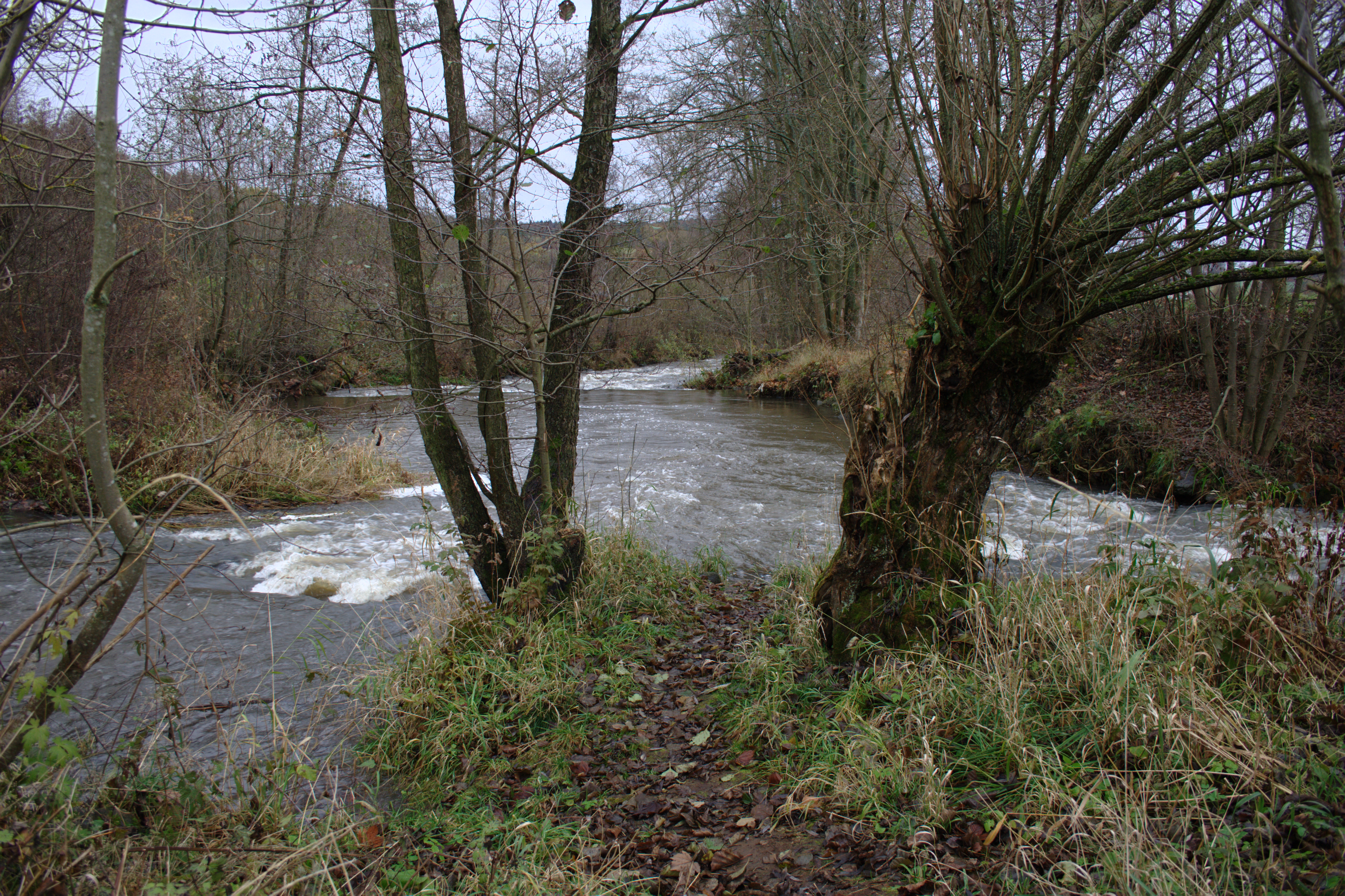

Location
- Country: Germany
- State: Hesse

Physical characteristics
- Mouth
  - location: Schlitz
  - coordinates: 50.6278°N 9.5044°E
- Length: 30.0 km (18.6 mi)
- Basin size: 135 km^{2} (52 sq mi)

Basin features
- Progression: Schlitz→ Fulda→ Weser→ North Sea

The Altefeld (in its upper course: Schwarzer Fluß) is a river of Hesse, Germany. Its confluence with the Lauter in Bad Salzschlirf forms the Schlitz. It has a length of 30 km.

== See also ==
- List of rivers of Hesse
