= Hoherodskopf =

Mountain in Hesse, Germany

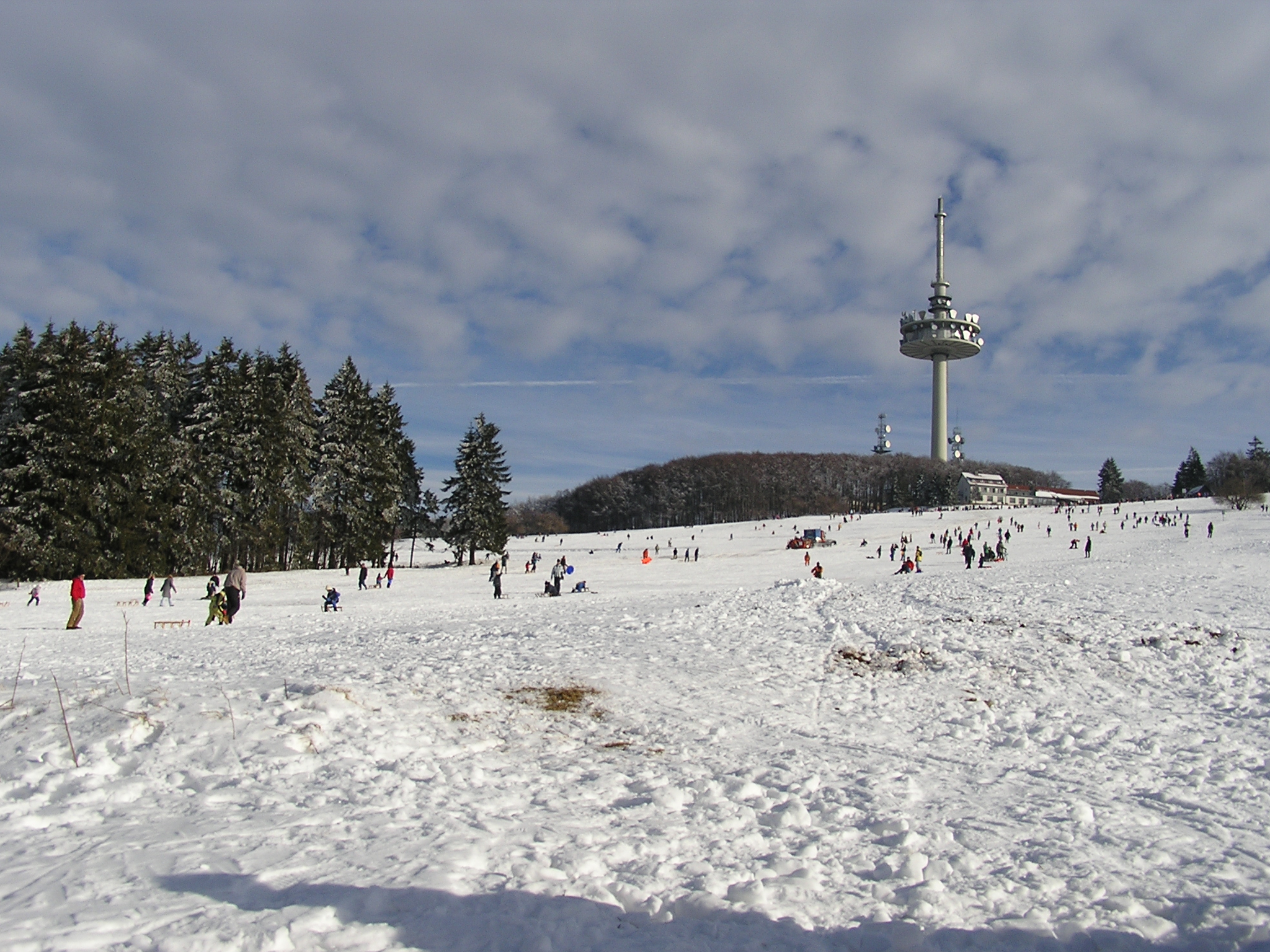
- The Hoherodskopf (Vogelsberg), in winter

Highest point
- Elevation: 764 m (2,507 ft)
- Coordinates: 50°30′40″N 9°13′37″E

Geography
- Location: Hesse, Germany

Hoherodskopf is a mountain peak in the Vogelsberg of Hesse, Germany. It is a Miocene basaltic extinct volcano. A telecommunications tower is sited on top of the peak.
