= Bilstein (Vogelsberg) =

Mountain in Schotten, Hesse, Germany

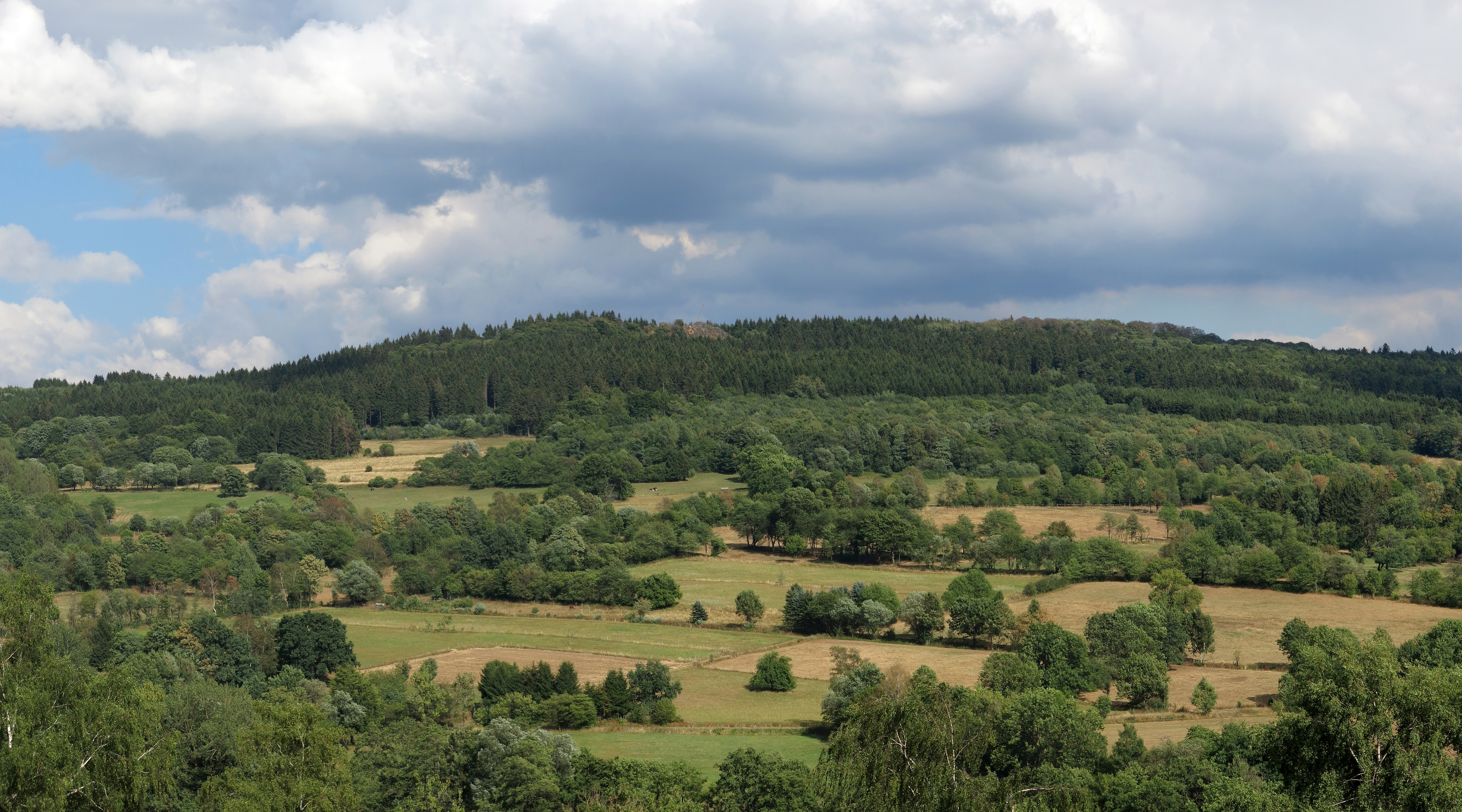
- Bilstein from west

Highest point
- Elevation: 666 m (2,185 ft)

Geography
- Location: Hesse, Germany
- Parent range: Vogelsberg

Bilstein is a mountain of Hesse in the Vogelsberg, Germany. Its highest point is 666 meters above sea level and is located in the Vogelsberg range. The basalt rocks on the summit on the otherwise densely wooded mountain offers a good viewpoint. This makes it one of the most unique mountains and is a popular German hiking attraction.
