= Horst (Vogelsberg) =

Mountain in Vogelsberg

Coordinates: 50°28′01″N 9°24′07″E

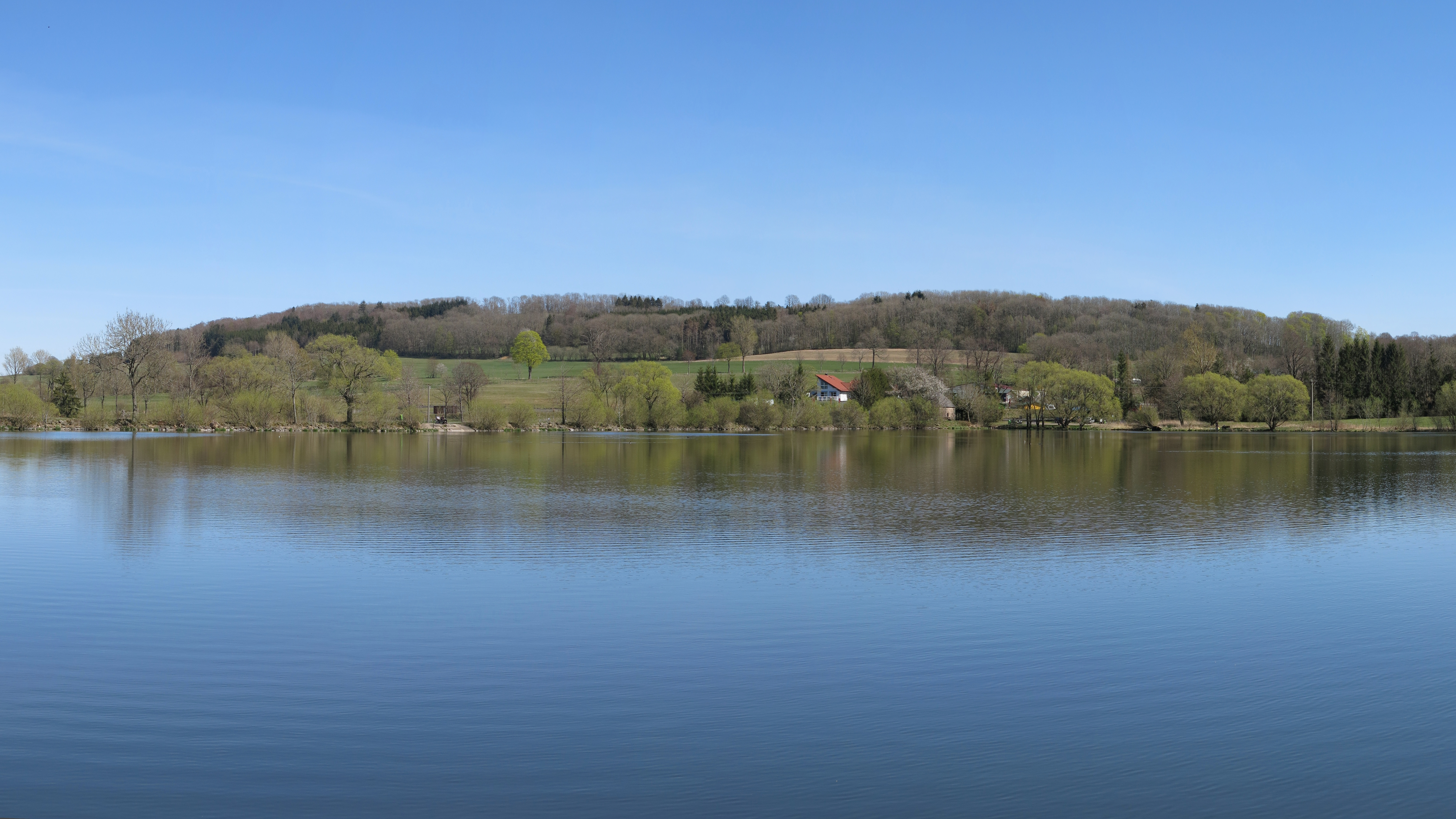
- View over the pond near Nieder-Moos to the Horst

Highest point
- Elevation: 553 m (1,814 ft)

Geography
- Location: Hesse, Germany
- Parent range: Vogelsberg

Horst is a hill in the Vogelsberg of Hesse, Germany.
