= Jossa =

Jossa may refer to:

== Places ==
- Jossa (Fulda), a river of Hesse, Germany, tributary of the Fulda
- Jossa (Lüder), a river of Hesse, Germany, tributary of the Lüder
- Jossa (Sinn), a river of Hesse, Germany, tributary of the Sinn
- Jossa (Sinntal), a village in Hesse, Germany

== People ==
- Jacqueline Jossa (born 1992), English actress
- Megan Jossa (born 1996), English actress
