= Ilsbach =

River in Germany

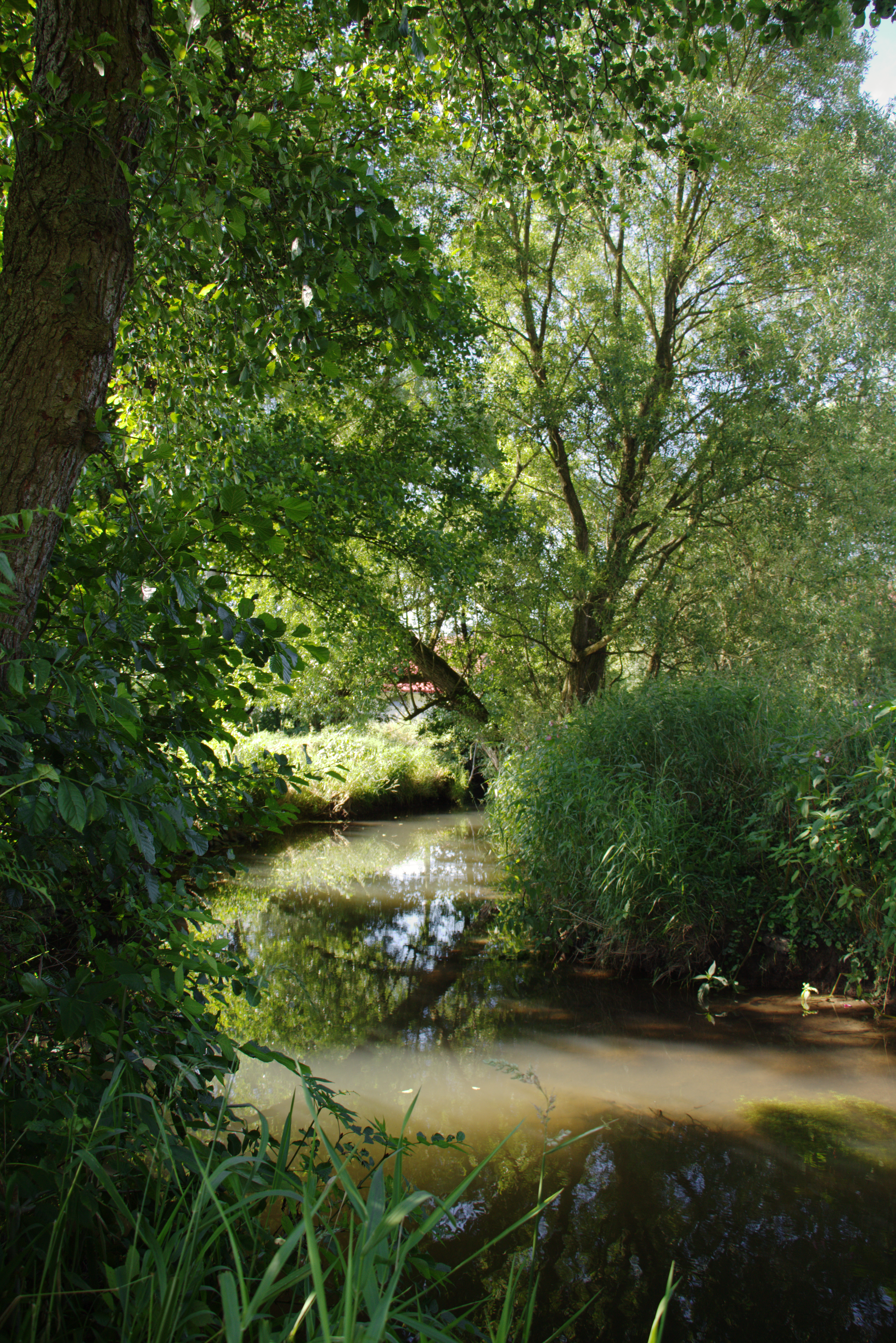

Location
- Country: Germany
- State: Hesse

Physical characteristics
- Mouth
  - location: Seenbach
  - coordinates: 50°36′47″N 09°01′45″E
- Length: 20.7 km (12.9 mi)

Basin features
- Progression: Seenbach→ Ohm→ Lahn→ Rhine→ North Sea

The Ilsbach (in its upper course: Streitbach, in its middle course: Sausel) is a river of Hesse, Germany. It is a 20.7 km long, right-bank tributary of the Seenbach and flows into it in Mücke.

The 48.13 km² catchment area of the Ilsbach lies in the Vogelsberg and is drained to the North Sea via the Seenbach, the Ohm, the Lahn and the Rhine.

== See also ==
- List of rivers of Hesse
