= Kemmete =

River in Germany

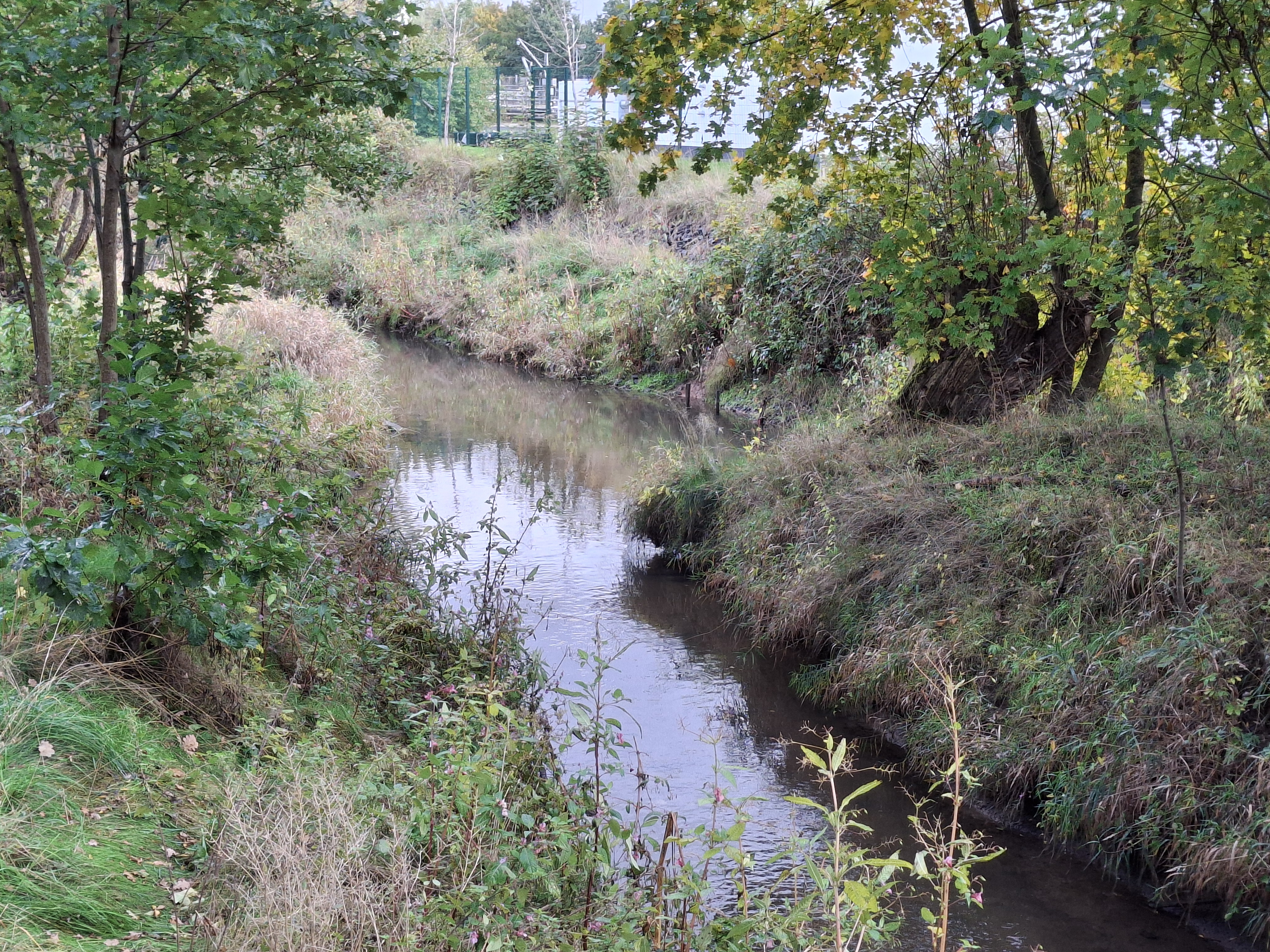

Location
- Country: Germany
- State: Hesse

Physical characteristics
- Mouth
  - location: Fliede
  - coordinates: 50.4567°N 9.6185°E
- Length: 15.8 km (9.8 mi)

Basin features
- Progression: Fliede→ Fulda→ Weser→ North Sea

Kemmete is a river of Hesse, Germany. It flows into the Fliede in Neuhof.

== See also ==
- List of rivers of Hesse
