= Lüder (river) =

River in Germany

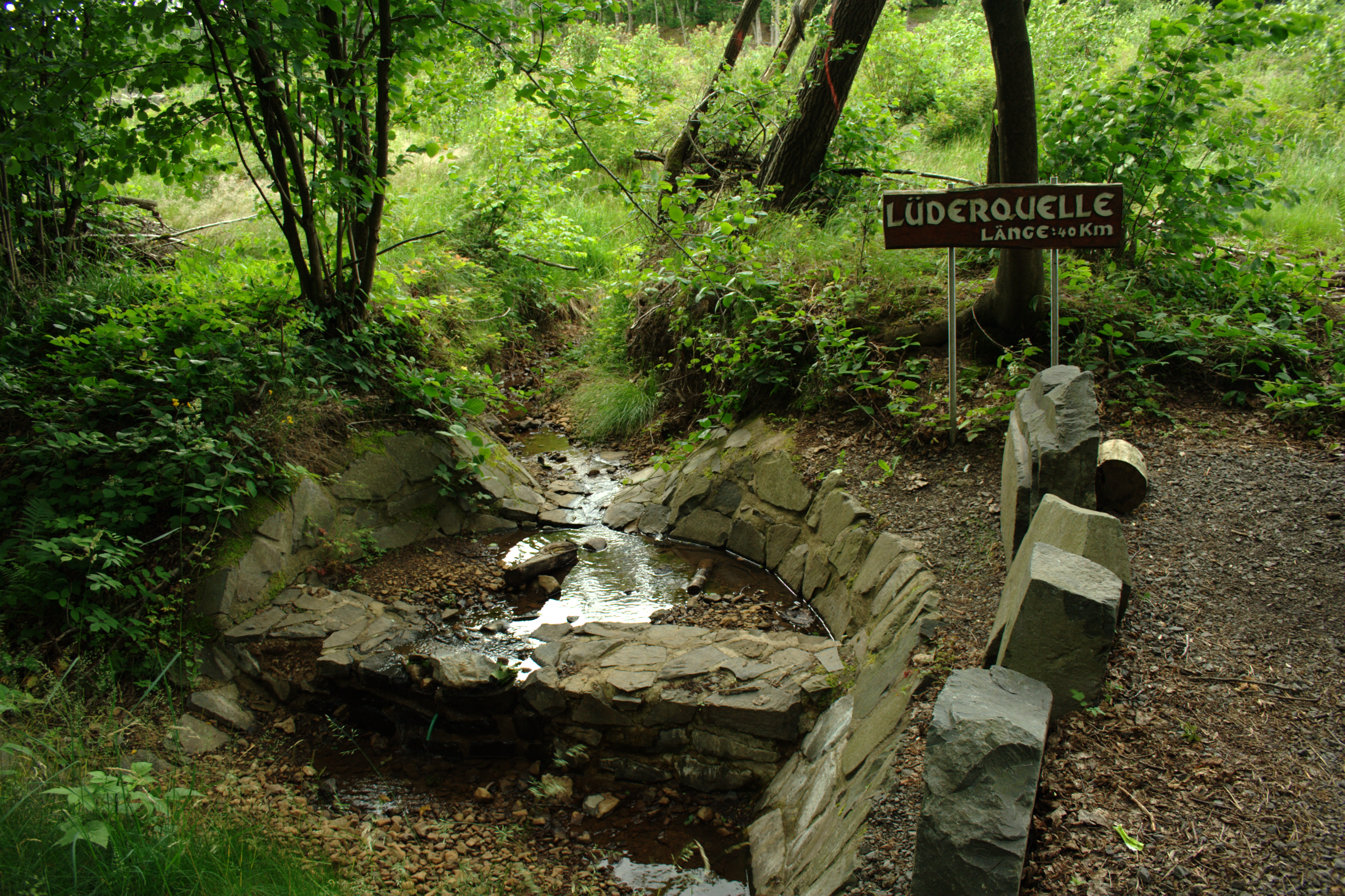

Location
- Country: Germany
- State: Hesse

Physical characteristics
- Source
  - location: Grebenhain
  - coordinates: 50.4589°N 9.3083°E
- Mouth
  - location: Fulda
  - coordinates: 50.6040°N 9.6115°E
- Length: 22.6 km (14.0 mi)

Basin features
- Progression: Fulda→ Weser→ North Sea

The Lüder is a river of Hesse, Germany. It flows into the Fulda river from the left bank northwest of Fulda town. Its source is in the upland bog of the Völzberger Köpfchen.

== See also ==
- List of rivers of Hesse
