= Völzberger Köpfchen =

Hill in Hesse, Germany

Coordinates: 50°27′29″N 9°18′13″E

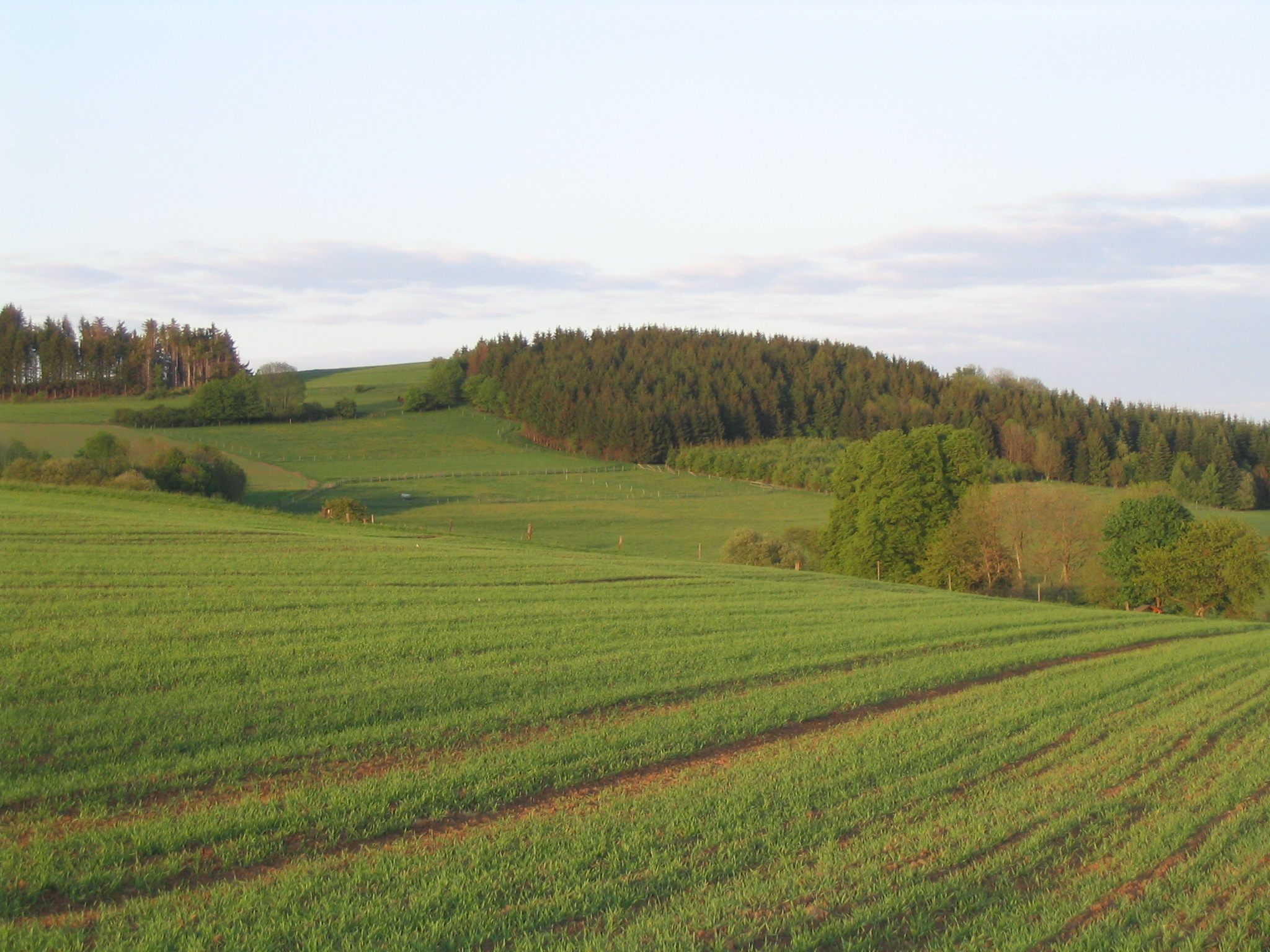
- The head of Völzberg from the west.

Highest point
- Elevation: 570.8 m (1,873 ft)

Geography
- Location: Hesse, Germany

Völzberger Köpfchen is a hill in the Vogelsberg mountain range, located in Hesse, Germany. It rises 570.8 m making it the highest point in the Main-Kinzig district.

== Flora ==
Vogelsberg mountain range is the largest contiguous basalt massif in Central Europe. Flora in the higher areas are beech forests, spruce forests, hardwood and broken forests. There is also a raised bog. Upstream from the forest are flowering mountain meadows and sometimes bristle grass. The Vogelsberg mountain range is the starting point for many small rivers and springs.

== Tourism ==
Climb Völzberger Köpfchen on the Vogelsberg volcano ring hiking trail, circling Europe's largest extinct volcanic area. The trail has an approximate length of 115 km and can be hiked in six stages, climbing Völzberger Köpfchen in stage four.
