= Sieben Ahorn =

Mountain in Hesse, Germany

Coordinates: 50°32′N 9°13′E

Highest point
- Elevation: 753 m (2,470 ft)

Geography
- Location: Hesse, Germany

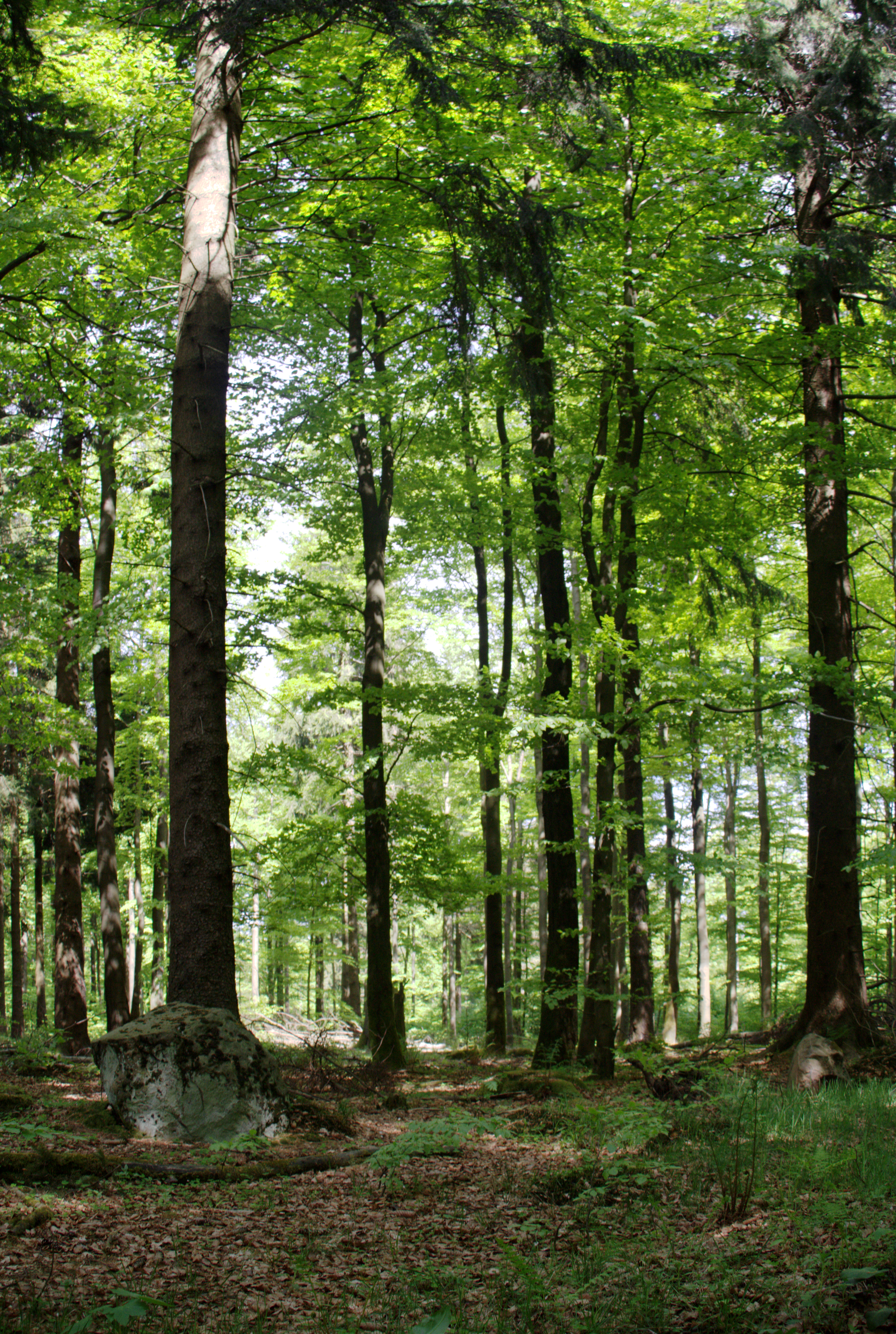
"Naturpark Hoher Vogelsberg" Sieben Ahorn Mountain "Summit" (Plateau).

Sieben Ahorn is a mountain of Hesse, Germany.
