= Taufstein (Vogelsberg) =

Mountain in Germany

Coordinates: 50°32′N 9°14′E

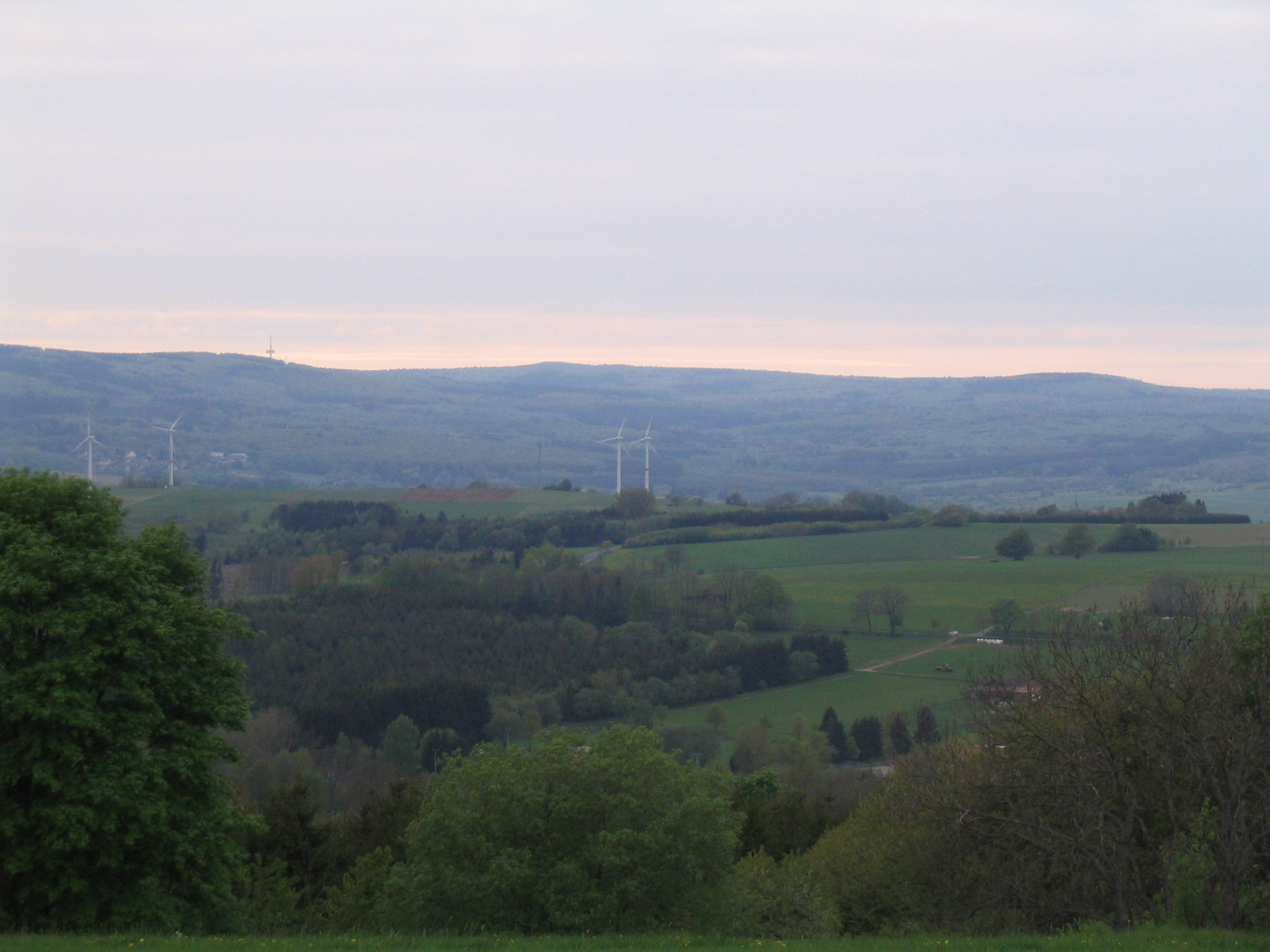
- View from the Horst (553 m) to the northwest to the Taufstein (773), the highest peak in the Vogelsberg.

Highest point
- Elevation: 773 m (2,536 ft)

Geography
- Location: Hesse, Germany

Taufstein is a mountain volcano of Hesse, Germany.

The 22 m high Bismarck tower, standing on the summit of the Taufstein mountain, was completed in 1910. It was built as a lookout tower according to a design by the architect Ludwig Hofmann from 1906.
