= Jossa (Lüder) =

River in Germany

Location
- Country: Germany
- State: Hesse

Physical characteristics
- Mouth
  - location: Lüder
  - coordinates: 50.5416°N 9.4870°E
- Length: 11.7 km (7.3 mi)

Basin features
- Progression: Lüder→ Fulda→ Weser→ North Sea

Jossa is a river of Hesse, Germany. It flows into the Lüder near Hosenfeld.

== See also ==
- List of rivers of Hesse
