= Lauter (Schlitz) =

River in Hesse, Germany

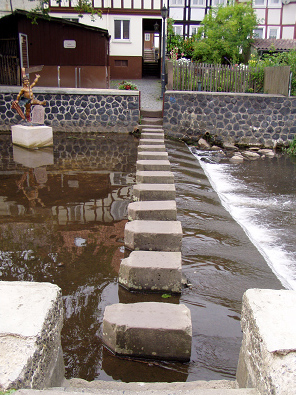

Location
- Country: Germany
- State: Hesse

Physical characteristics
- Mouth
  - location: Schlitz
  - coordinates: 50.6278°N 9.5044°E
- Length: 28.0 km (17.4 mi)
- Basin size: 136 km^{2} (53 sq mi)

Basin features
- Progression: Schlitz→ Fulda→ Weser→ North Sea

Lauter (German pronunciation: [ˈlaʊtɐ]) is a river of Hesse, Germany. At its confluence with the Altefeld in Bad Salzschlirf, the Schlitz is formed.

== See also ==
- List of rivers of Hesse
