= Bad Salzschlirf =

- Municipality
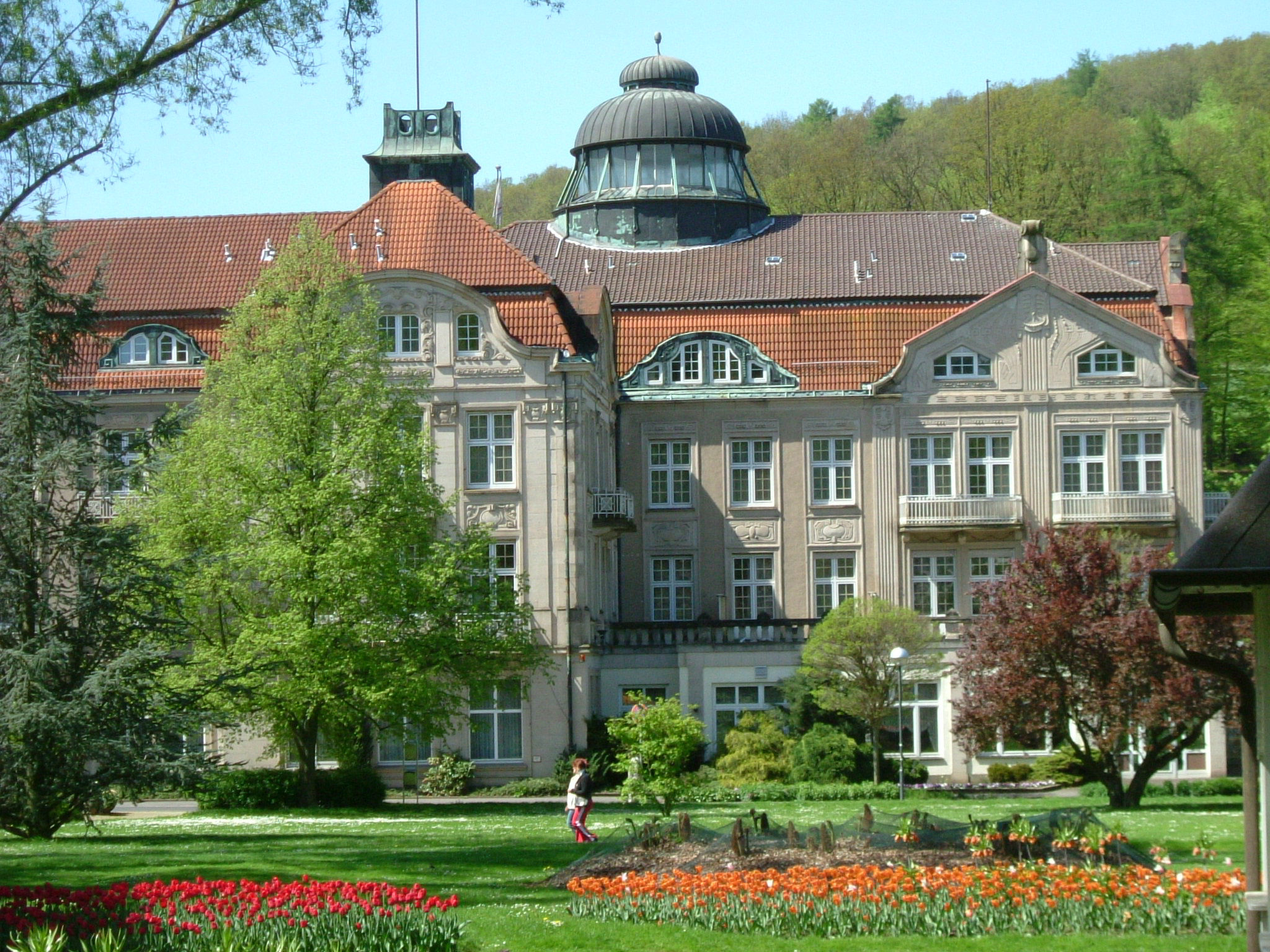
- Hotel Badehof

- Coat of arms

- Location of Bad Salzschlirf within Fulda district
- Interactive map of Bad Salzschlirf
- Location within Germany Location within Hesse
- Coordinates: 50°37′N 9°30′E
- Country: Germany
- State: Hesse
- Admin. region: Kassel
- District: Fulda

Government
  - Mayor (2018–24): Matthias Kübel

Area
  - Total: 13.04 km^{2} (5.03 sq mi)
- Elevation: 280 m (920 ft)

Population (2025-12-31)
  - Total: 3,716
  - Density: 285.0/km^{2} (738.1/sq mi)
- Time zone: UTC+01:00 (CET)
  - Summer (DST): UTC+02:00 (CEST)
- Postal codes: 36364
- Dialling codes: 06648
- Vehicle registration: FD
- Website: www.badsalzschlirf.de

Bad Salzschlirf is a municipality in the district of Fulda, in Hesse, Germany.
