= Fliede =

River in Germany

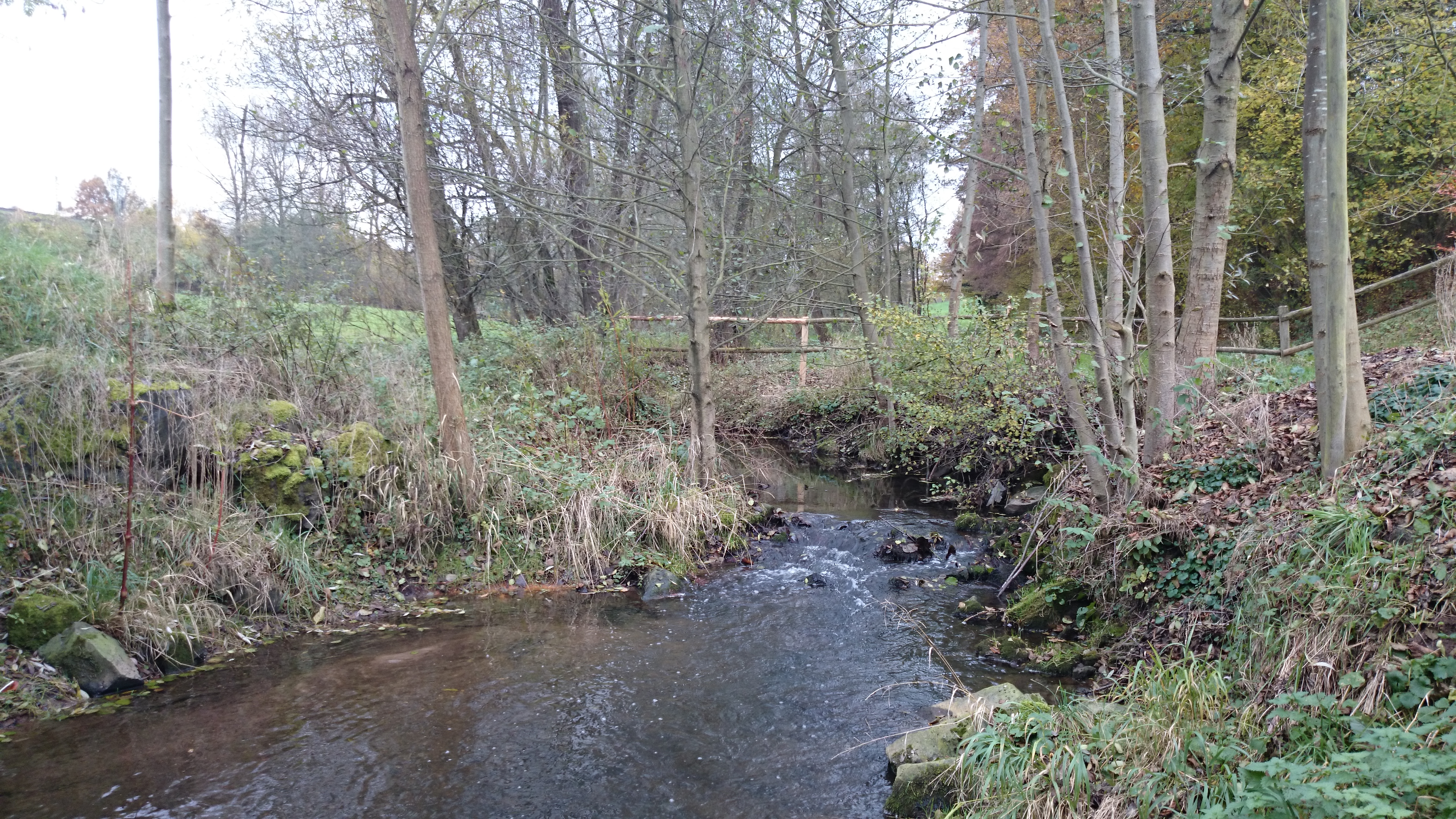

Location
- Country: Germany
- State: Hesse

Physical characteristics
- Mouth
  - location: Fulda
  - coordinates: 50.5098°N 9.6676°E
- Length: 21.8 km (13.5 mi)

Basin features
- Progression: Fulda→ Weser→ North Sea

Fliede (in its upper course: Hermannswasser) is a river of Hesse, Germany. It flows into the Fulda south of the town Fulda.

== See also ==
- List of rivers of Hesse
