= Neuhof, Hesse =

Neuhof
- Municipality
- Coat of arms

- Location of Neuhof within Fulda district
- Interactive map of Neuhof
- Location within Germany Location within Hesse
- Coordinates: 50°26′N 09°37′E
- Country: Germany
- State: Hesse
- Admin. region: Kassel
- District: Fulda
- Subdivisions: 8 districts

Government
  - Mayor (2022–28): Heiko Stolz (CDU)

Area
  - Total: 90.28 km^{2} (34.86 sq mi)
- Elevation: 270–480 m (890–1,570 ft)

Population (2025-12-31)
  - Total: 10,790
  - Density: 119.5/km^{2} (309.5/sq mi)
- Time zone: UTC+01:00 (CET)
  - Summer (DST): UTC+02:00 (CEST)
- Postal codes: 36119
- Dialling codes: 06655, 06669, 0661
- Vehicle registration: FD
- Website: www.neuhof-fulda.de

Neuhof (German pronunciation: [ˈnɔʏhoːf]) is a municipality in the district of Fulda, in Hesse, Germany. It is situated 15 km southwest of Fulda.

== Villages in Neuhof ==
- Dorfborn
- Giesel (Neuhof)
- Hattenhof (Neuhof)
- Hauswurz
- Kauppen (Neuhof)
- Rommerz
- Tiefengruben (Neuhof)

== Transportation ==
Bundesautobahn 66 passes through the town. The Neuhof train station, located on the Frankfurt–Göttingen railway sees regular regional express service to Frankfurt and Fulda.

== People ==
- Wilhelm Diegelmann (1861-1934), German actor
