= Seenbach =

River in Germany

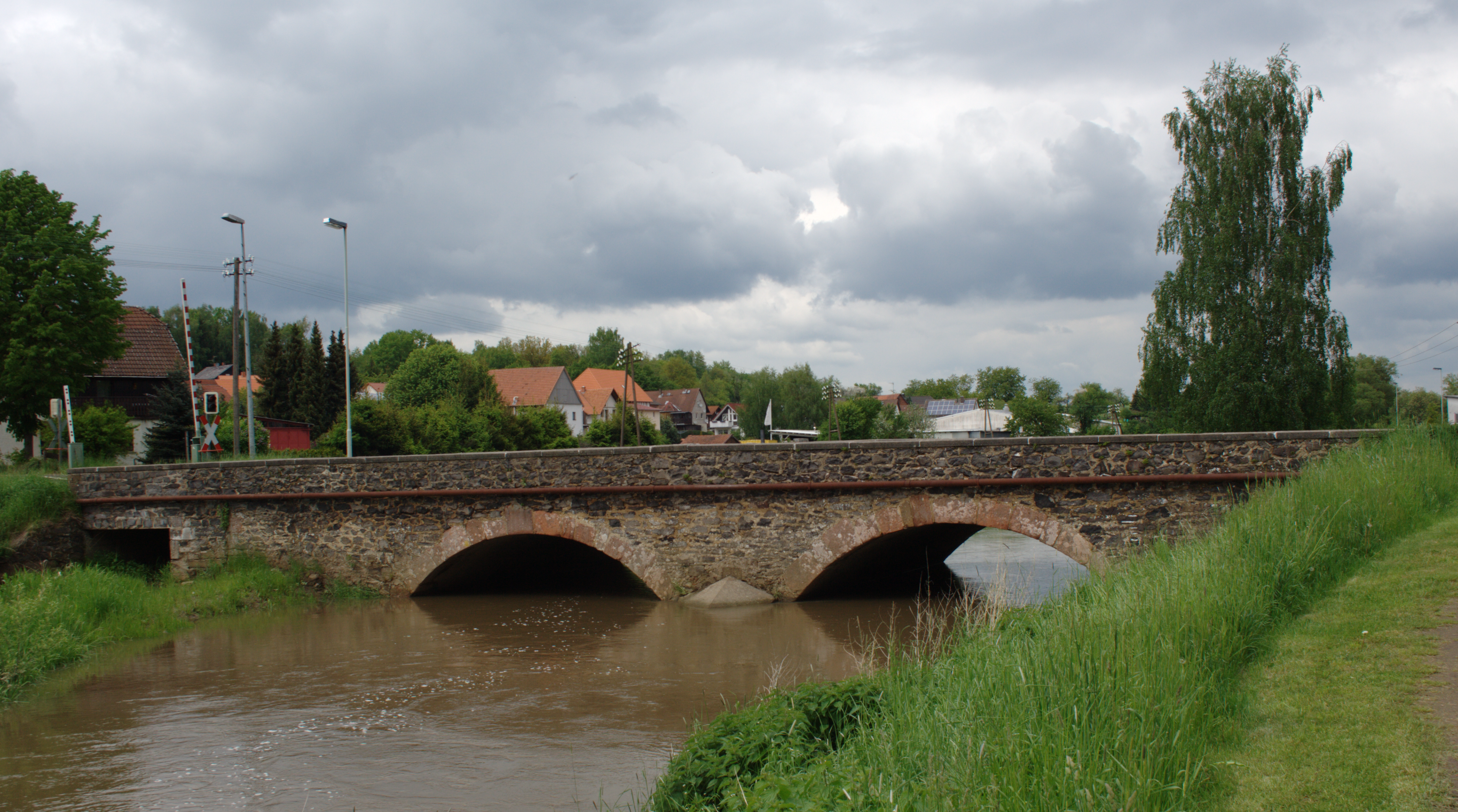

Location
- Country: Germany
- State: Hesse

Physical characteristics
- Mouth
  - location: Ohm
  - coordinates: 50.6314°N 9.0372°E
- Length: 18.3 km (11.4 mi)

Basin features
- Progression: Ohm→ Lahn→ Rhine→ North Sea

Seenbach is a river of Hesse, Germany. It flows into the Ohm near Mücke.

== See also ==
- List of rivers of Hesse
