= Giesel (Fulda) =

River in Germany

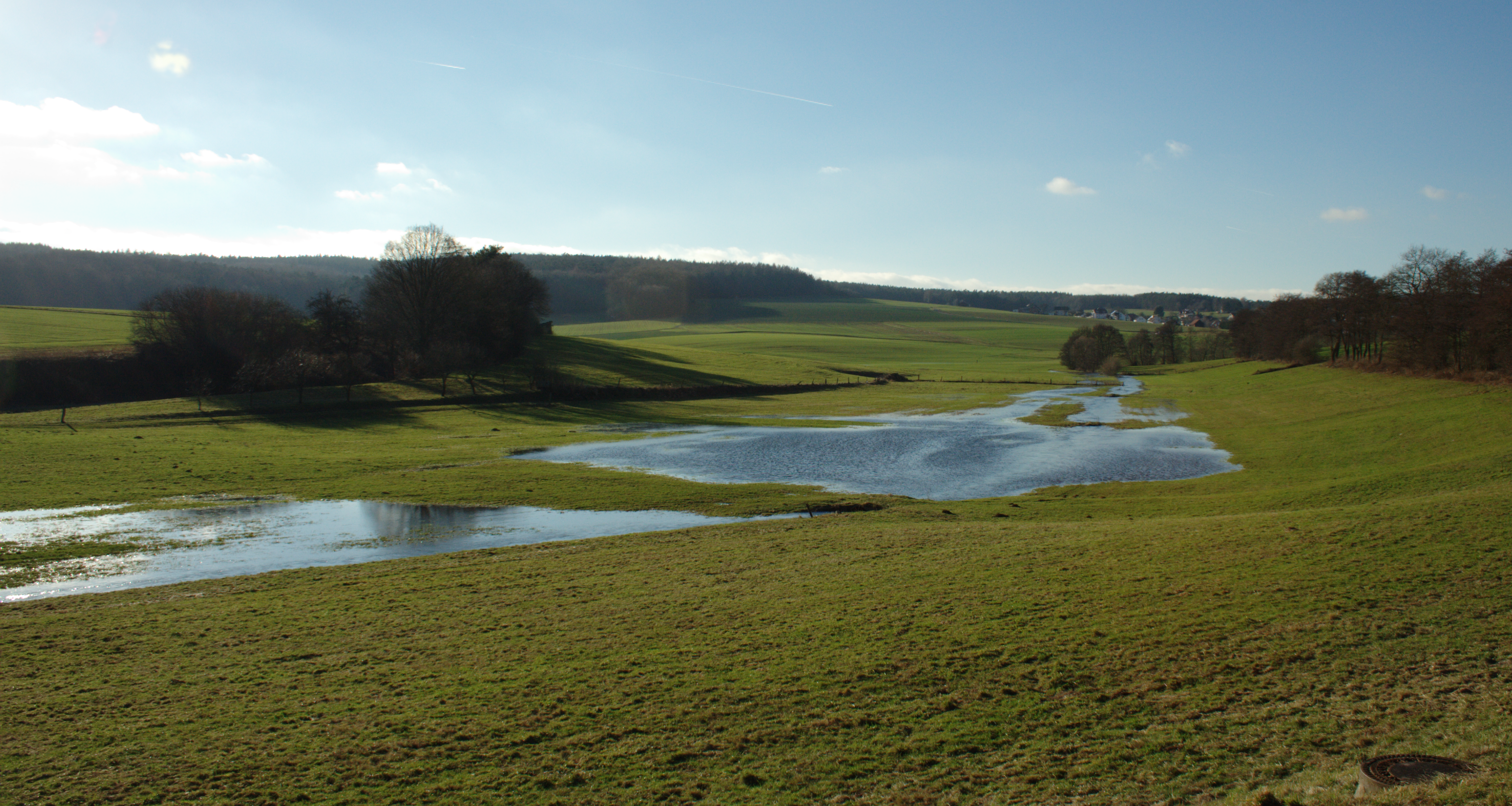

Location
- Country: Germany
- State: Hesse

Physical characteristics
- Mouth
  - location: Fulda
  - coordinates: 50.5292°N 9.6739°E
- Length: 6.9 km (4.3 mi)

Basin features
- Progression: Fulda→ Weser→ North Sea

Giesel is a small river of Hesse, Germany. It flows into the Fulda near the town Fulda.

== See also ==
- List of rivers of Hesse
