= Holy Ghost Ukrainian Catholic Church =

Ukrainian Greek Catholic church in the US

Coordinates: 40.677342°N 75.236820°W

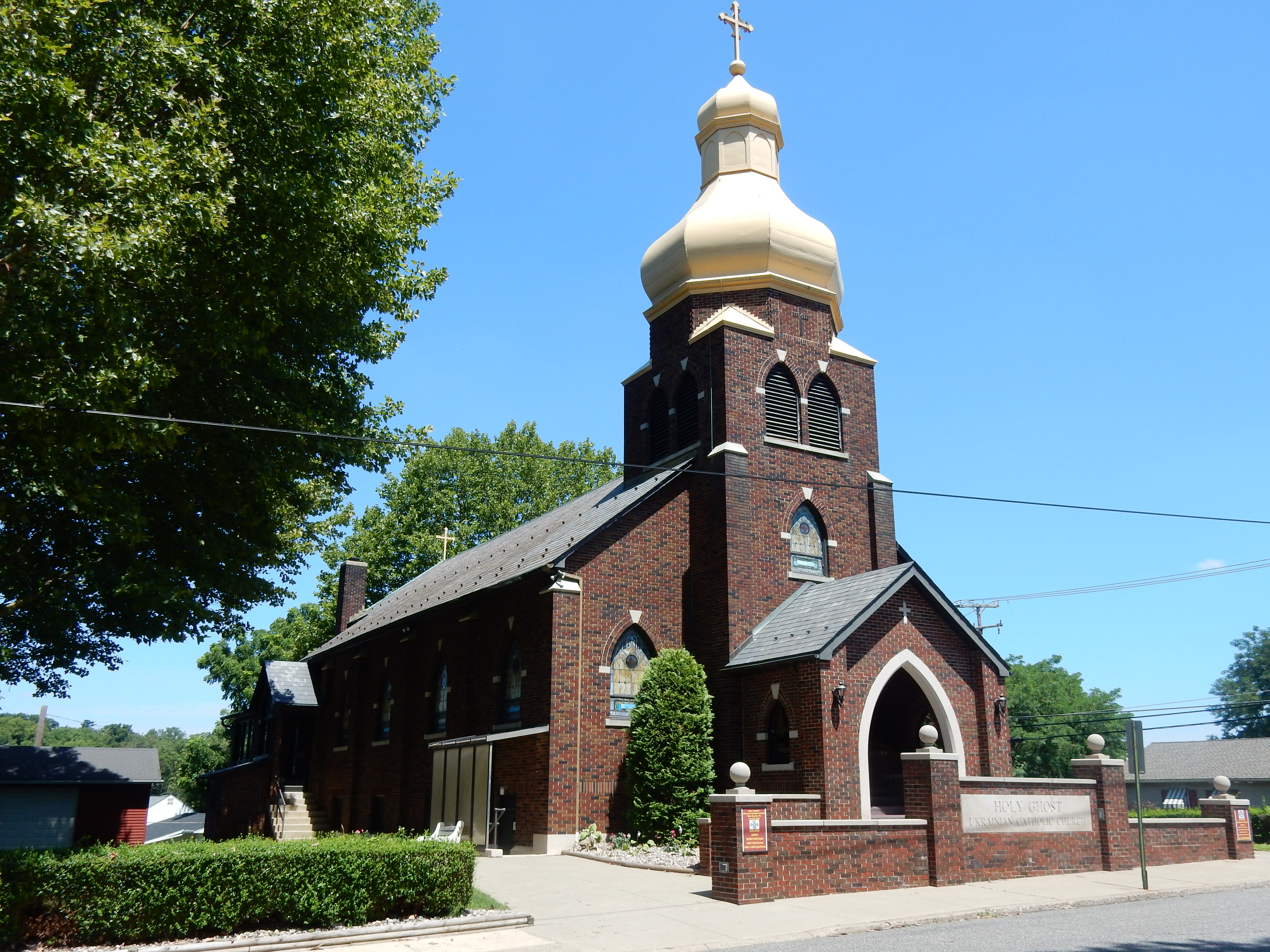
Holy Ghost Ukrainian Catholic Church in West Easton, Pennsylvania

Holy Ghost Ukrainian Catholic Church is a Ukrainian Greek Catholic church in West Easton, Pennsylvania. Father Paul Makar is the administrator. Father Yaroslav Lukavenko is the church's parochial vicar. The parish, as of 2022, serves 83 families.

== History ==
The church was first established in 1921. In May 2017, the church underwent a major restoration of its dome costing over $10,000.
