= West Easton, Pennsylvania =

Borough in Pennsylvania, US

West Easton
- Borough
- Borough of West Easton
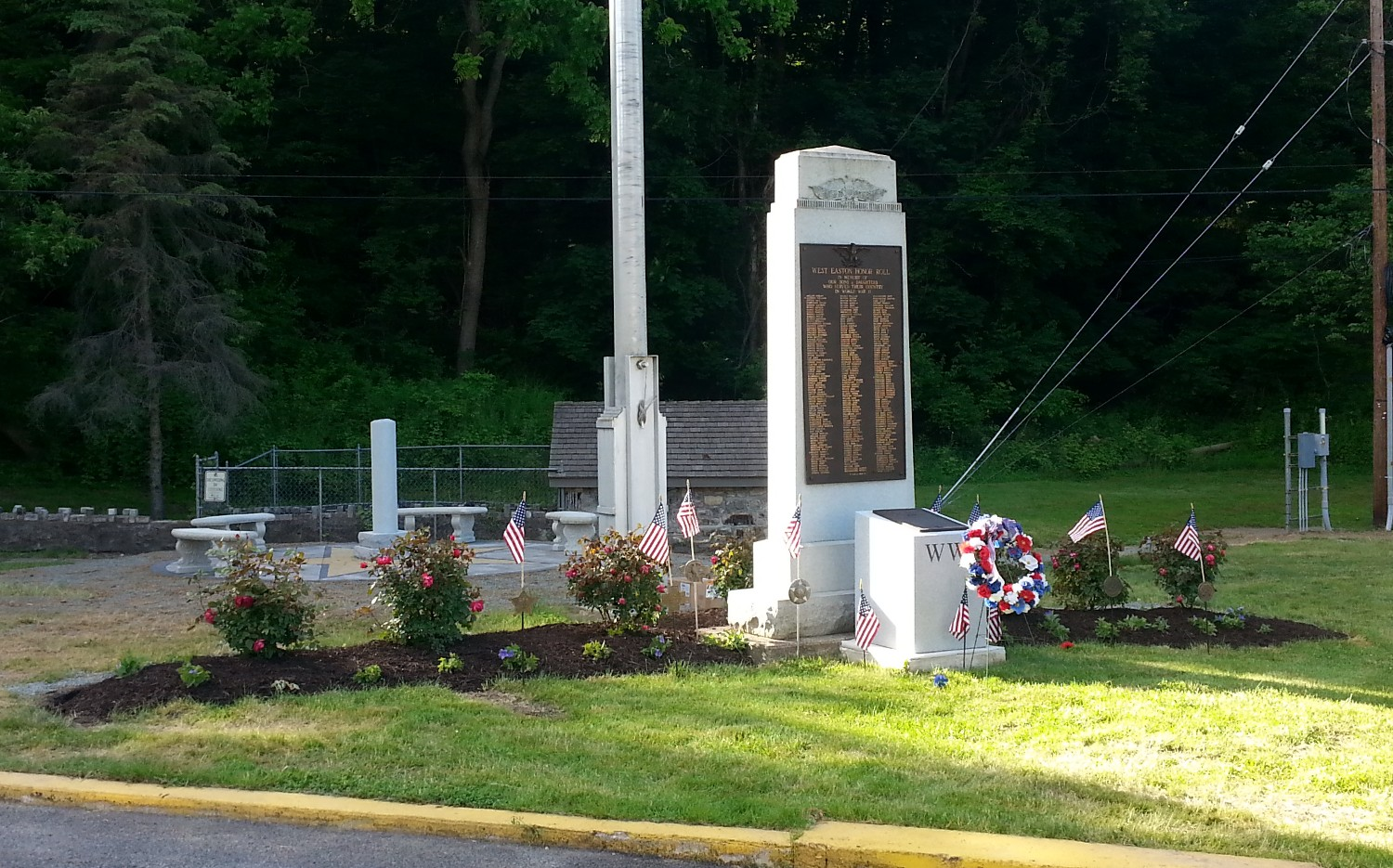
- War Monument Park in West Easton in May 2019

- Location of West Easton in Northampton County, Pennsylvania (left) and of Northampton County in Pennsylvania (right)

- Location of West Easton in Pennsylvania West Easton (the United States)
- Coordinates: 40°40′42″N 75°14′10″W
- Country: United States
- State: Pennsylvania
- County: Northampton
- Incorporated: June 6, 1898

Government
  - Type: Strong Council
  - Council President: Paul James
  - Mayor: Dan DePaul

Area
  - Borough: 0.34 sq mi (0.87 km^{2})
  - Land: 0.31 sq mi (0.79 km^{2})
  - Water: 0.031 sq mi (0.08 km^{2})
- Elevation: 230 ft (70 m)

Population (2010)
  - Borough: 1,257
  - Estimate (2019): 1,250
  - Density: 4,094.1/sq mi (1,580.75/km^{2})
  - Metro: 865,310 (US: 68th)
- Time zone: UTC-5 (EST)
  - Summer (DST): UTC-4 (EDT)
- ZIP Code: 18042
- Area codes: 610 and 484
- Primary airport: Lehigh Valley International Airport
- Major hospital: Lehigh Valley Hospital–Cedar Crest
- School district: Wilson Area
- Website: www.westeastonborough.com

West Easton is a borough in Northampton County, Pennsylvania, United States. As of the 2020 census, West Easton had a population of 1,237. West Easton is part of the greater Easton area and the Lehigh Valley metropolitan area, which had a population of 861,899 and was the 68th-most populous metropolitan area in the U.S. as of the 2020 census.

== History ==
=== 18th century ===
West Easton traces its origin to the heirs of William Penn. In 1737, the Penns sold 500 acres of land to a James Hamilton, who in turn sold the land to Garrett Moor. In 1772, Mr. Moor sold 200 acres of the land to John Philip Odenwelder, Sr.

=== 19th century ===
In 1834, William Penn's son, John Penn, laid out the Village of Odenweldertown. Adjoining his acreage was land that eventually became the Village of Mutchlertown in 1872. By 1877, Mutchlertown had 35 frame homes.

West Easton was incorporated by the Court of Quarter Sessions of Northampton County, Pennsylvania on May 30, 1898. However, the Decree of Incorporation was not filed until June 6, 1898, making the June 6 date its official date of incorporation.

Its incorporation was strenuously opposed by a large number of property owners and it was a slim majority who signed in favor of it. Only after a heated debate before Judge Schuyler on June 10, 1898, did he deny the minority's objections to incorporation, and upheld the charter granted. Odenweldertown and Mutchlertown were successfully merged and became, The Borough of West Easton. The first borough officers were elected to office on July 12, 1898.

=== 20th century ===
By the 1920s and into the 1930s, West Easton was a hub of manufacturing activity and employment opportunities, with mills producing textiles and small businesses providing services. The population increased to its historical peak in the 1930 census. By then, West Easton had its own school, youth sports teams, a trolley connection, railroad freight and coal lines, a police department, a self-supporting volunteer fire company, and numerous community committees staffed by involved citizens.

In the decades following World War II, West Easton felt the effects of many prosperous towns dependent upon industry that was succumbing to imported goods and production lines that required fewer human workers. Industry in West Easton steadily declined, and so did the borough's population. The Livingstone School closed in 1974. West Easton's youth sports programs ended and civic committees could not retain enough active members. The West Easton Police Department closed in 1965 and police protection was provided by contract with a neighboring community until contracting was not offered for 2013. West Easton turned to Pennsylvania State Police for protection after failing to find another community who would offer affordable police services by contract.

=== 21st century ===
In 2015, all incumbent council members running for reelection were defeated, including Council President Kelly Gross, daughter of then Mayor Gerald Gross. Following installation of new council members from that election, West Easton's new leadership concentrated on improving transparency of local government, took an aggressive approach to obtaining grant awards and donations, promoted community volunteerism, reestablished discarded community activities, and investigated creating its own police department. The 2016 council appointed a new solicitor, a new borough manager, a new treasurer, and hired a new engineering firm.

In 2017, Mayor Gerald Gross, who had served the borough for 52 years, beginning as a Councilman, chose not to run for re-election. Council President Dan DePaul ran unopposed for mayor and was elected. The new council began to concentrate on previously neglected infrastructure, including roads and public sidewalks. A $124,000 storm drain project, paid for with a grant, relieved residents experiencing flooding problems on their property and sidewalks. In November, 2018, West Easton began building its first Public Works Building for the community that would be completed in multiple phases, as grants were awarded for each phase of the project. The Borough hired Mr. Robert Mahady, a retired PA State Trooper, as a consultant to navigate the red tape of creating a new police force. In May 2019, West Easton made improvements to its War Monument Park with the addition of The Gold Star Fountain and landscaping work, in an ongoing project to be funded with grants. It began installing new public sidewalks where needed, among other grant paid projects.

After 54 years without its own police force, West Easton swore in a chief of police in November 2019. There had been opposition against a police department from a few vocal residents who claimed creating a police department would cost $1 million, and bankrupt the borough. The actual cost in finding a building for the police department and making repairs to it, purchasing vehicles and equipment, and other needs in launching a part-time police department was less than $50,000, with most of it being paid for through grants and donations. The roll-out of West Easton's part-time police department was planned for early 2020, but due to the COVID-19 pandemic, it did not see a full complement of three part-time police officers until mid-2021. The budget to operate the police department annually is approximately $160,000. State Police are on-call when there are gaps in coverage by West Easton's part-time police force.

In 2022, The Safety First Volunteer Fire Company separated from its social club due to lack of financial support from the club, and changed its name. Now renamed West Easton Volunteer Fire Company #1, it relies on significant financial support from the borough.

West Easton governs under a strong council–weak mayor system. Council introduces and votes on ordinances, resolutions, policies, and other matters. The mayor has a vote only in the event of a tie among council. The mayor may veto an ordinance, which can be subject to an override vote by council. The mayor also has oversight responsibilities for the police department.

The governing body consists of a seven-member borough council who are elected at-large by the citizens of the borough. The council president, council vice president, and president pro tempore are selected by the council members. The borough manager, borough treasurer, and other employees are hired by the council members, and provide for the day-to-day operations of the borough.

== Geography ==
West Easton is located at 40°40′42″N 75°14′10″W (40.678298, -75.236144). According to the U.S. Census Bureau, the borough has a total area of 0.3 square miles (0.78 km^{2}), of which 0.3 square miles (0.78 km^{2}) is land and 0.04 square miles (0.10 km^{2}) (8.82%) is water.

== Transportation ==
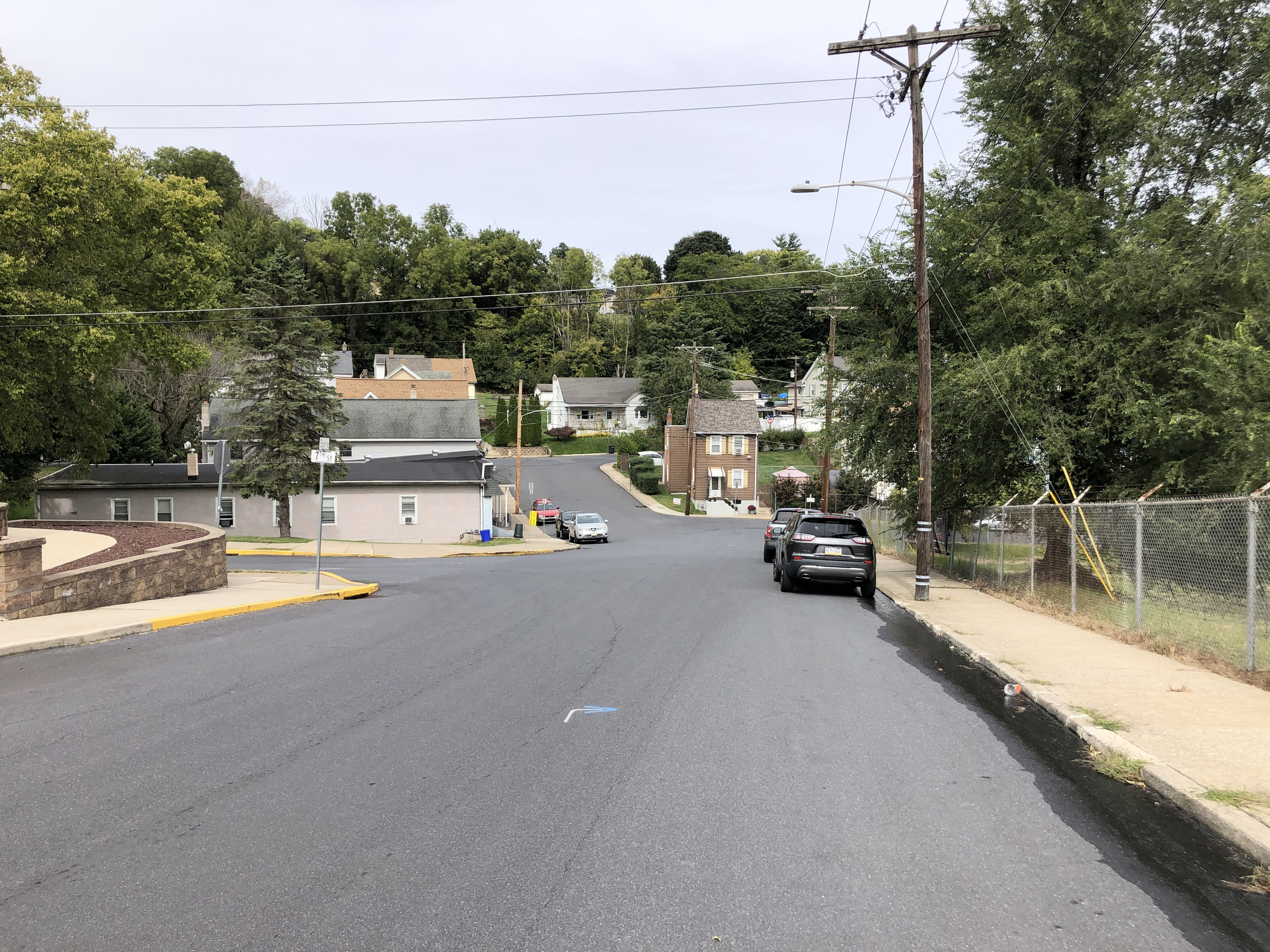
East Street in West Easton

As of 2007, there were 5.90 miles (9.50 km) of public roads in West Easton, of which 1.52 miles (2.45 km) were maintained by the Pennsylvania Department of Transportation (PennDOT) and 4.38 miles (7.05 km) were maintained by the borough.

Main thoroughfares in the borough include Lehigh Drive, Glendon Hill Road, Iron Street, Avona Avenue, East Street, and Main Street.

== Demographics ==
Historical population
Census	Pop.	Note	%±
1900	1,000		—
1910	1,033		3.3%
1920	1,408		36.3%
1930	1,564		11.1%
1940	1,159		−25.9%
1950	1,368		18.0%
1960	1,228		−10.2%
1970	1,123		−8.6%
1980	1,033		−8.0%
1990	1,163		12.6%
2000	1,152		−0.9%
2010	1,257		9.1%
2020	1,237		−1.6%

As of the 2010 census, there were 1,257 people, 488 households, and 175 families residing in the borough. The population density was 4,008 inhabitants per square mile (1,547/km^{2}). There were 516 housing units at an average density of 1,539.3 per square mile (594.3/km^{2}). The racial makeup of the borough was 85.0% White, 3.8% African American, 0.3% Native American, 0.7% Asian, 0.2% from other races, and 0.7% from two or more races. Hispanic or Latino of any race were 8.4% of the population.

There were 488 households, out of which 33.4% had children under the age of 18 living with them, 50.7% were married couples living together, 12.8% had a female householder with no husband present, and 30.8% were non-families. 25.4% of all households were made up of individuals, and 8.2% had someone living alone who was 65 years of age or older. The average household size was 2.55 and the average family size was 3.04.

In the borough, the population was spread out, with 25.0% under the age of 18, 7.7% from 18 to 24, 32.1% from 25 to 44, 21.4% from 45 to 64, and 13.7% who were 65 years of age or older. The median age was 38 years. For every 100 females there were 95.6 males. For every 100 females age 18 and over, there were 95.9 males.

The median income for a household in the borough was $39,615, and the median income for a family was $48,393. Males had a median income of $35,288 versus $25,781 for females. The per capita income for the borough was $17,901. About 9.5% of families and 9.9% of the population were below the poverty line, including 11.2% of those under age 18 and 9.0% of those age 65 or over.

== Public education ==
The borough is served by the Wilson Area School District. Students in grades nine through 12 attend Wilson Area High School in the district.

== Churches ==
- Holy Ghost Ukrainian Catholic Church

== Gallery ==
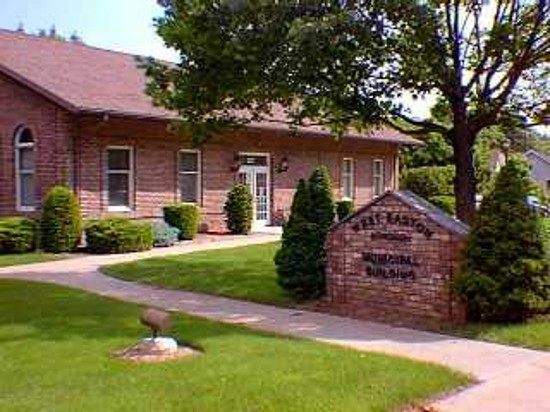
Borough Hall

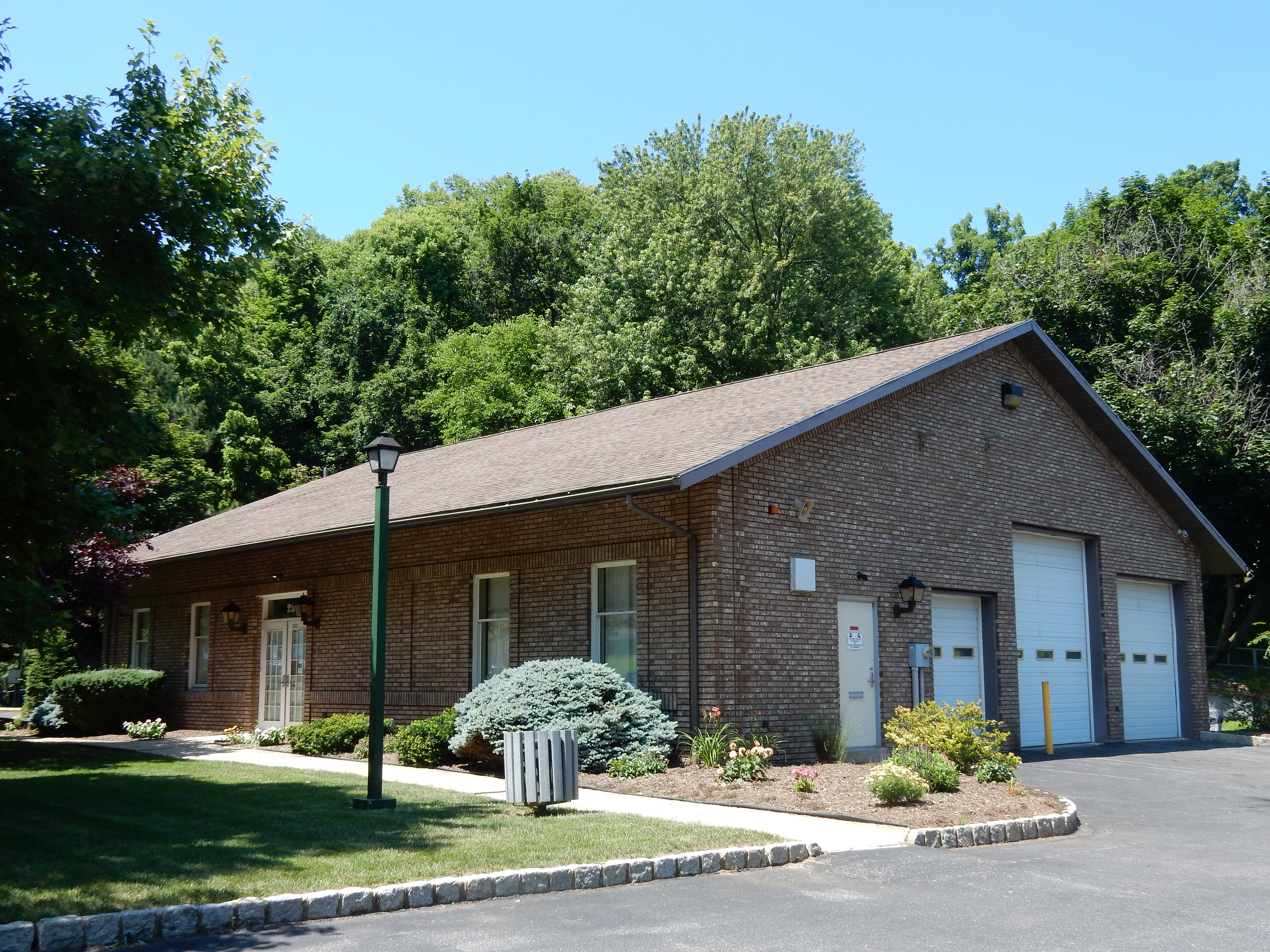
Borough Hall

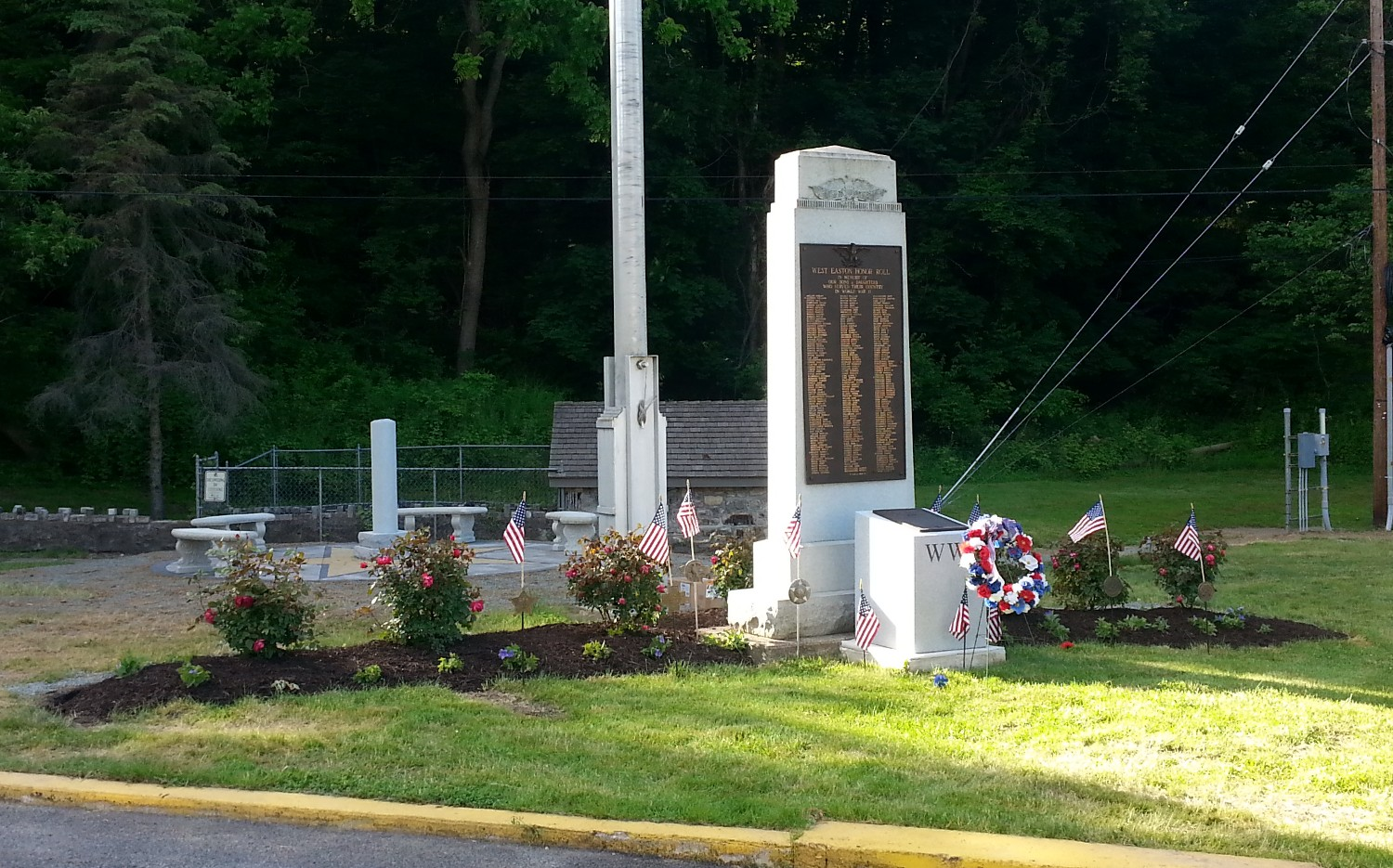
Monument Park

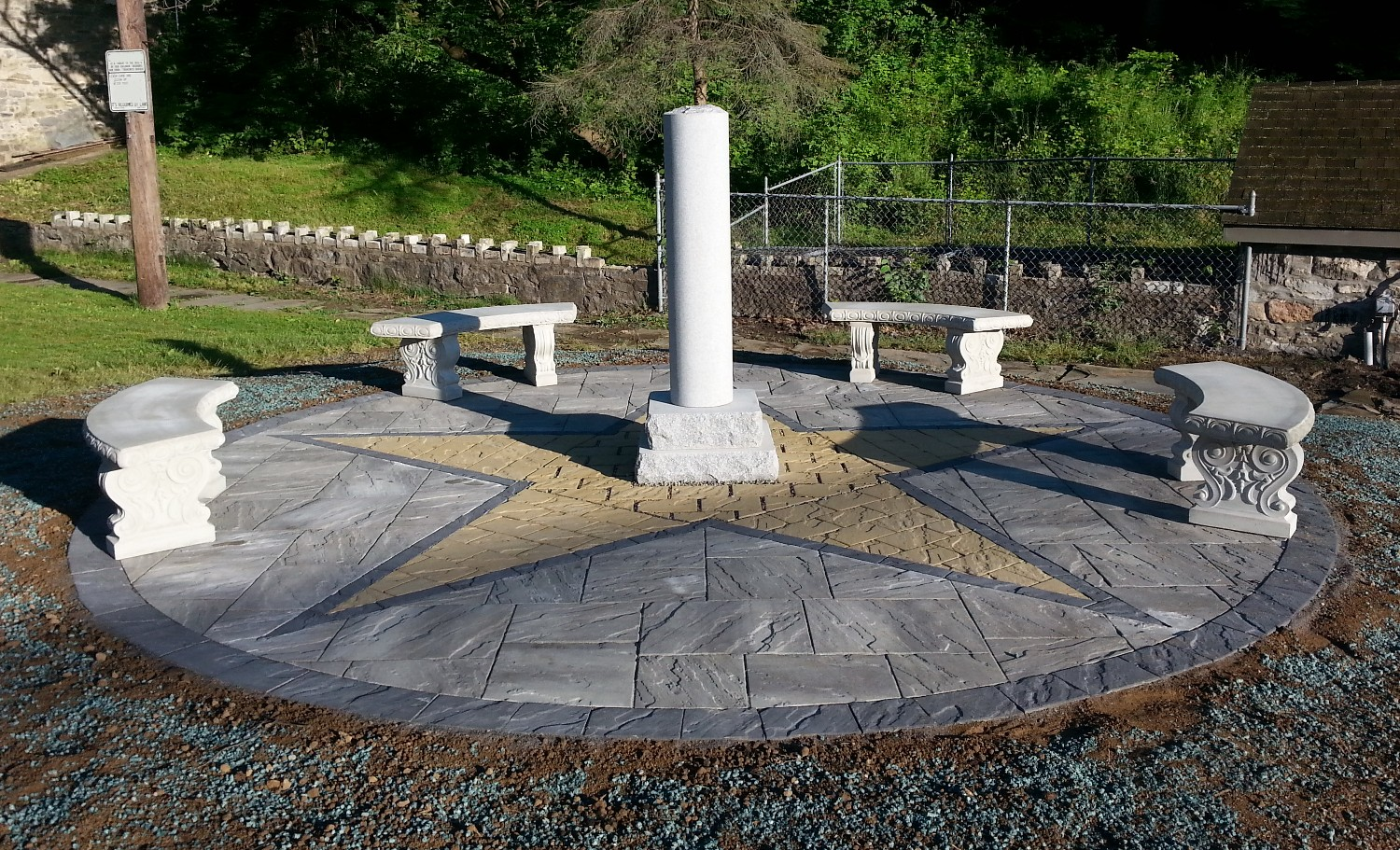
War Memorial Fountain

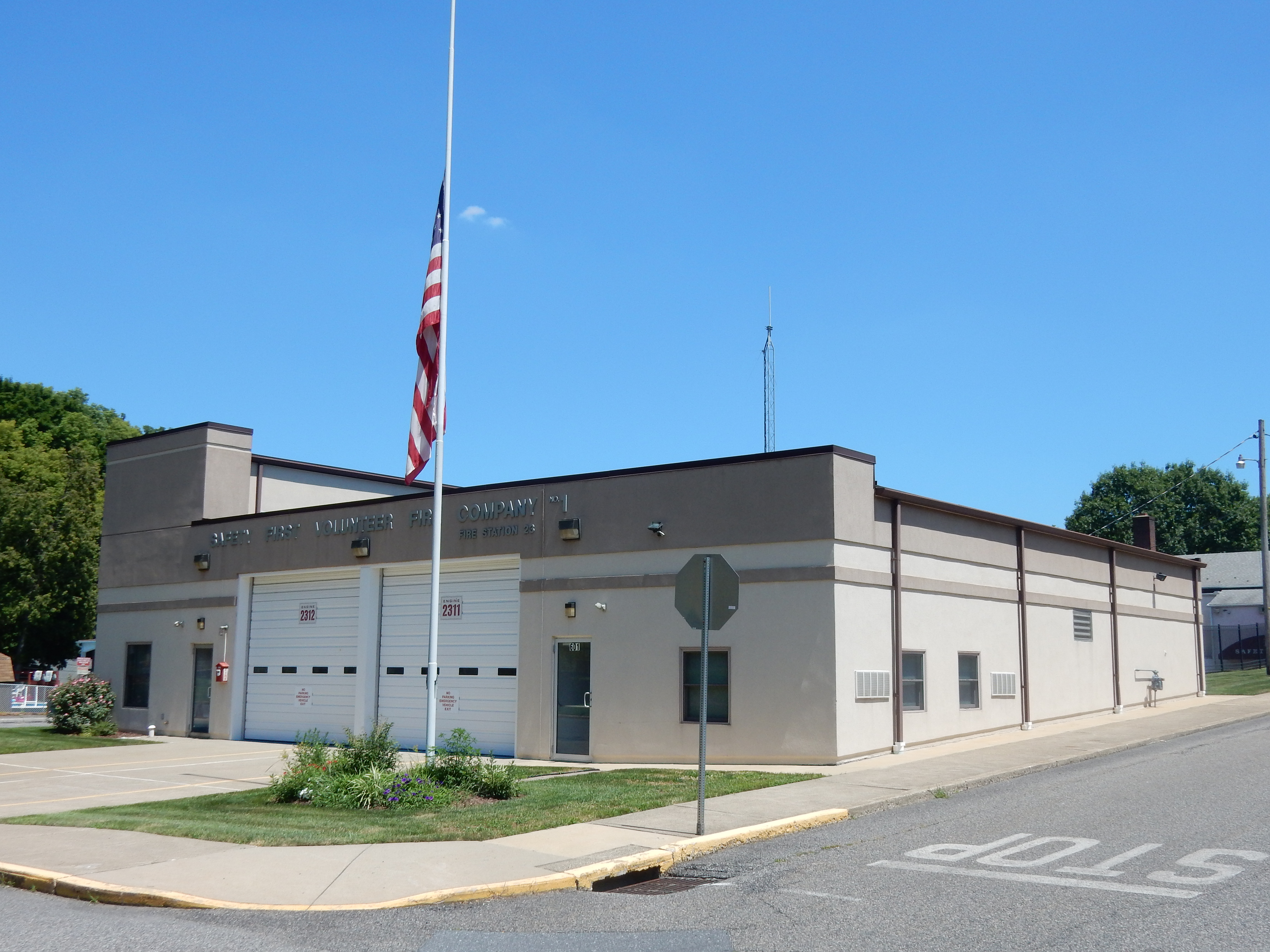
West Easton Fire Co.

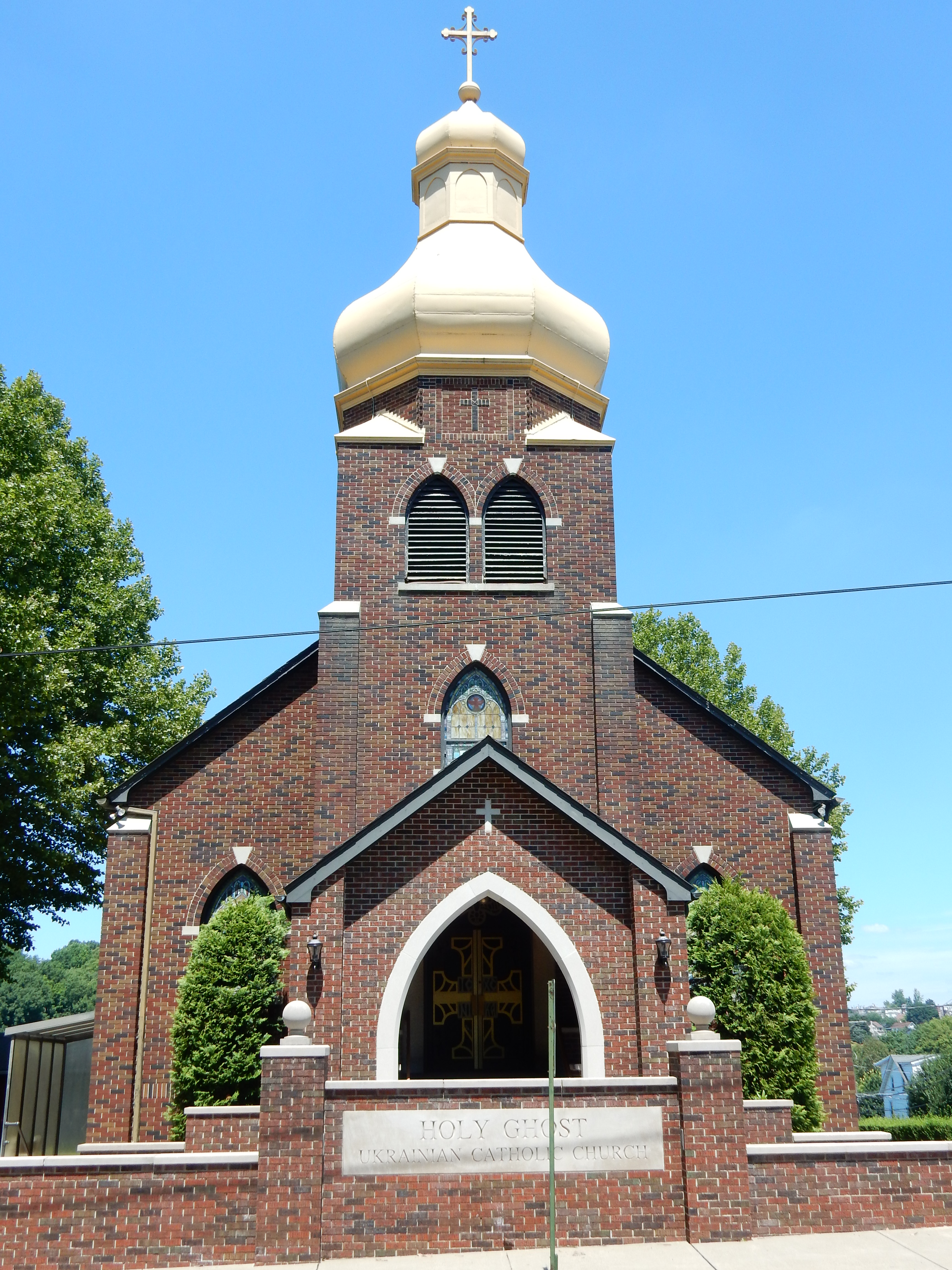
Ukrainian Catholic Church

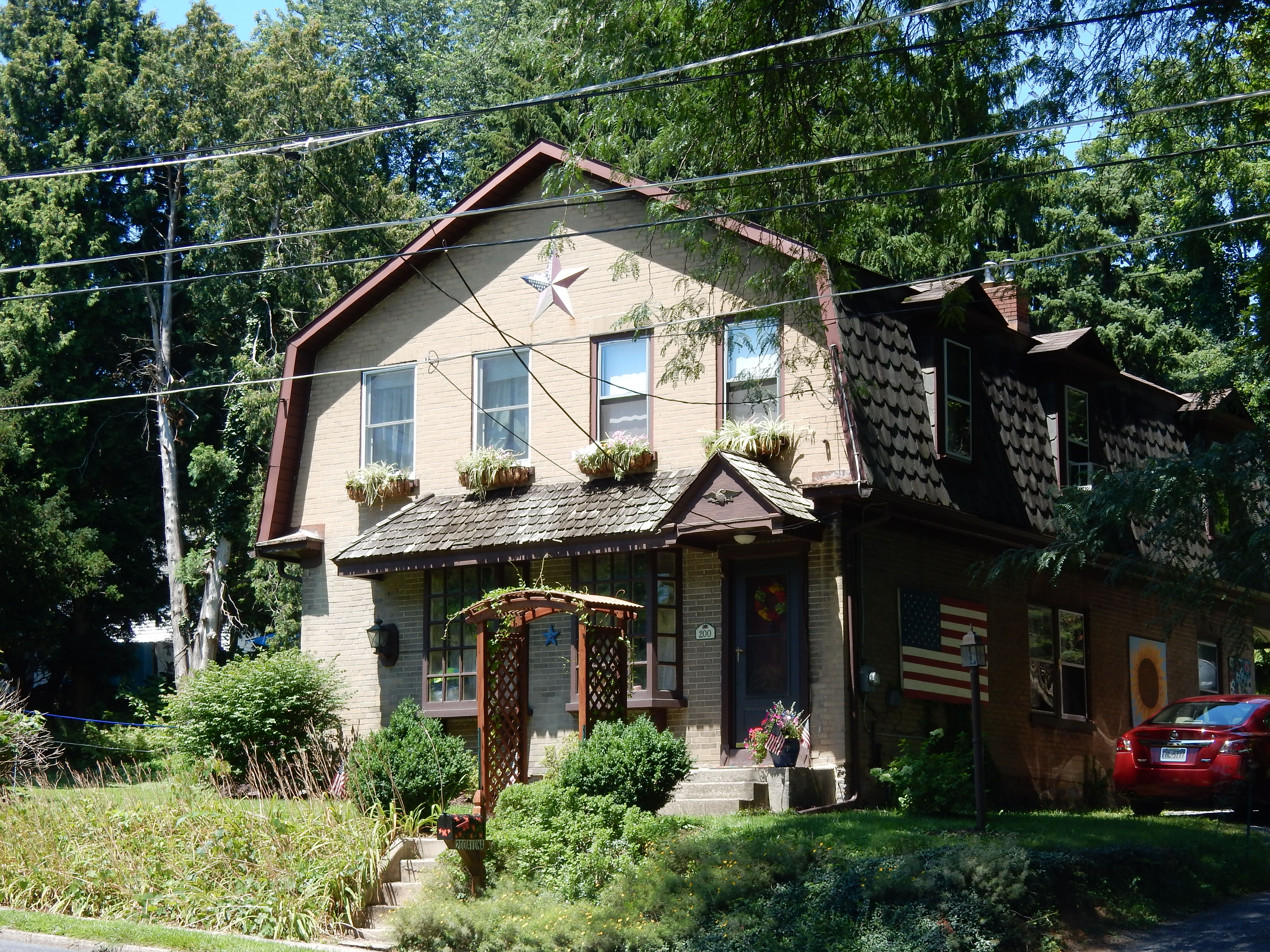
House on Spring Street

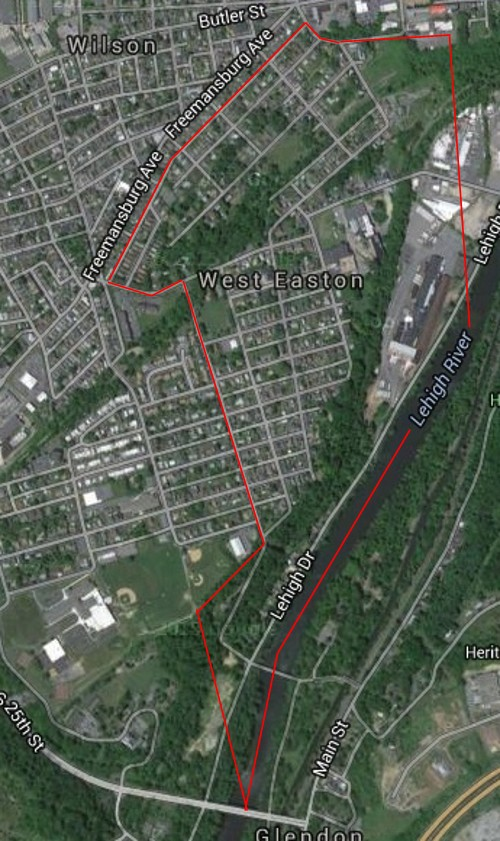
Satellite Image of West Easton
