= Königsbach =

Königsbach may refer to:

- Königsbach (Rhine), a river of Rhineland-Palatinate, Germany
- Luderbach, a river of Hesse, Germany also referred to as Königsbach
- Königsbach (Diestelbach), a river of North Rhine-Westphalia, Germany
- Königsbach an der Weinstraße, a village incorporated in Neustadt an der Weinstraße, Germany
- Königsbach-Stein, a municipality in Baden-Württemberg, Germany
