= Lohbach (Elbbach) =

River in Germany

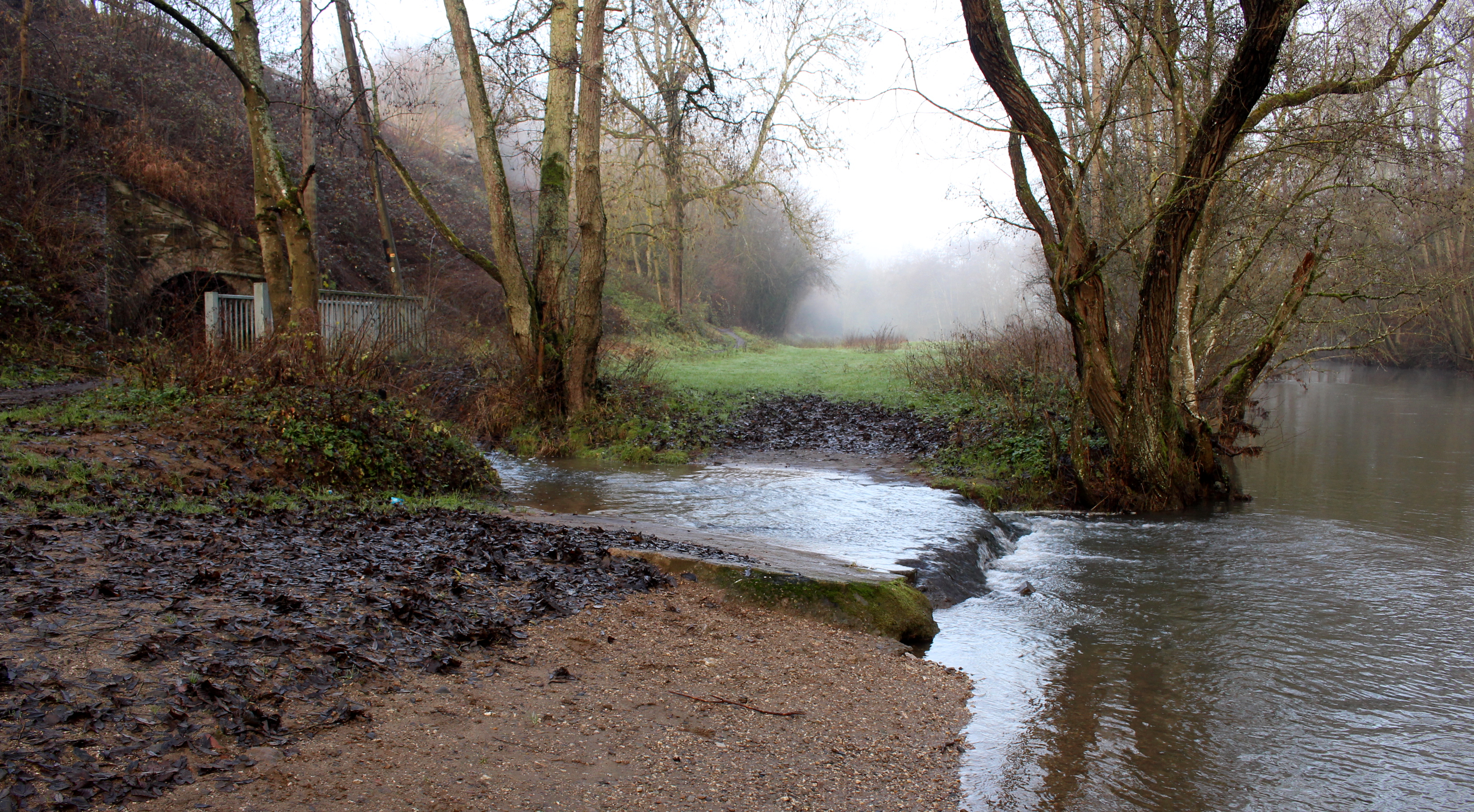

Location
- Country: Germany
- States: Hesse

Physical characteristics
- Mouth
  - location: Elbbach
  - coordinates: 50.4541°N 8.0453°E

Basin features
- Progression: Elbbach→ Lahn→ Rhine→ North Sea
- Tributaries
  - left: Frohnbach

Lohbach is a small river of Hesse, Germany. It flows into the Elbbach near Hadamar.

== See also ==
- List of rivers of Hesse
