= Hosbach =

River in Germany

Location
- Country: Germany
- State: Hesse

Physical characteristics
- Source
  - location: near Thurnhosbach, a district of Sontra
  - coordinates: 51.0946°N 9.8415°E
- Mouth
  - location: at Bischausen, a district of Waldkappel
  - coordinates: 51.1391°N 9.9358°E

The Hosbach is a small river of Hesse, Germany. It is a left tributary of the Wehre in the Werra-Meißner district in northern Hesse.

== See also ==
- List of rivers of Hesse
