= Eberbach (Mergbach) =

River in Germany

Location
- Country: Germany
- State: Hesse

Physical characteristics
- Mouth
  - location: Mergbach
  - coordinates: 49.7131°N 8.84189°E

Basin features
- Progression: Mergbach→ Gersprenz→ Main→ Rhine→ North Sea

The Eberbach (German pronunciation: [ˈeːbɐbax]) is a small river of Hesse, Germany. It flows into the Mergbach in Reichelsheim.

The Eberbach rises in the Odenwald in two branches at an altitude of about 504 m above sea level in a mixed forest area of the Rodensteiner Burgwald, west of Reichelsheim, on the southern slope of the Rimdidim, 498.5 m above sea level. In Reichelsheim it disappears into the ground in pipes and finally flows into the Mergbach west of the Konrad - Adenauer-Allee at an altitude of about 211 m above sea level.

== See also ==
- List of rivers of Hesse
