= Laudenauer Bach =

River in Germany

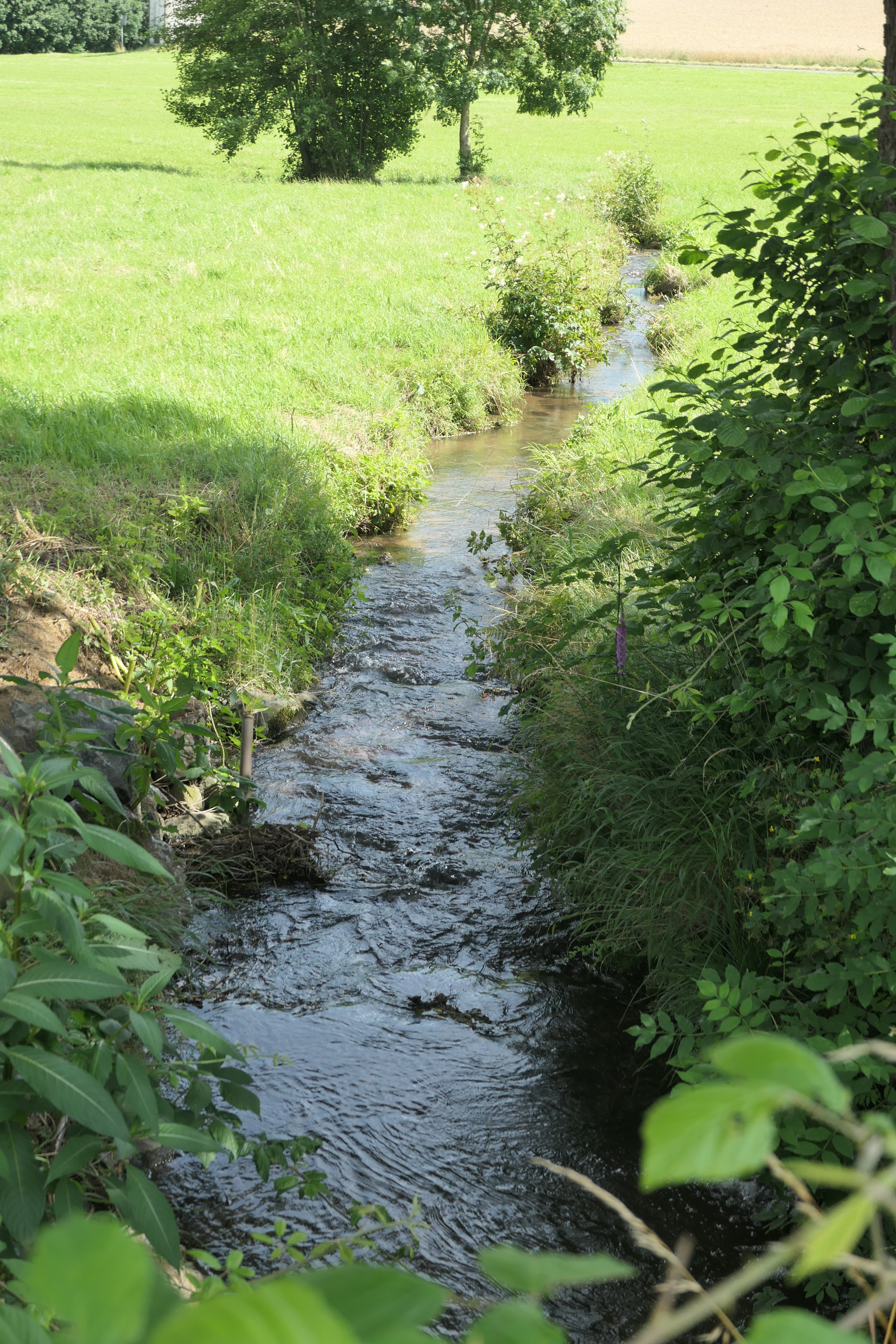

Location
- Country: Germany
- State: Hesse

Physical characteristics
- Mouth
  - location: Mergbach
  - coordinates: 49.6996°N 8.8195°E
- Length: 3.7 km (2.3 mi)

Basin features
- Progression: Mergbach→ Gersprenz→ Main→ Rhine→ North Sea
- Tributaries
  - right: Bach von dem Kohl, Bach an der Kniewiese

Laudenauer Bach is a small river of Hesse, Germany. It flows into the Mergbach near Reichelsheim.

== See also ==
- List of rivers of Hesse
