= Braubach (Liederbach) =

River in Germany

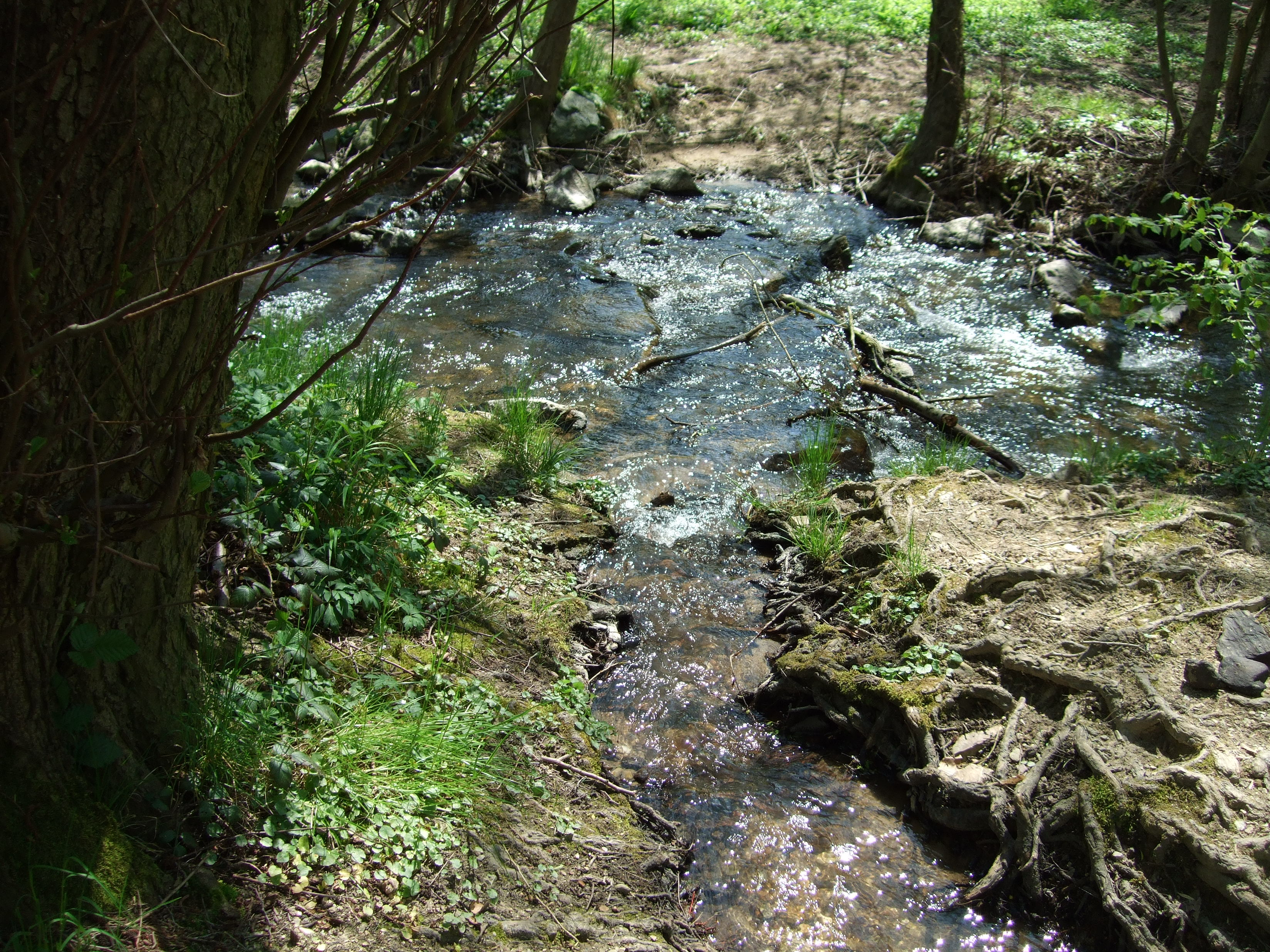

Location
- Country: Germany
- State: Hesse

Physical characteristics
- Mouth
  - location: Liederbach
  - coordinates: 50.1547°N 8.4528°E

Basin features
- Progression: Liederbach→ Main→ Rhine→ North Sea

The Braubach (German pronunciation: [ˈbʁaʊˌbax]) is a small river of Hesse, Germany. It is a right tributary of the Liederbach near Kelkheim.

== See also ==
- List of rivers of Hesse
