= Jungfernbach (Ahne) =

River in Germany

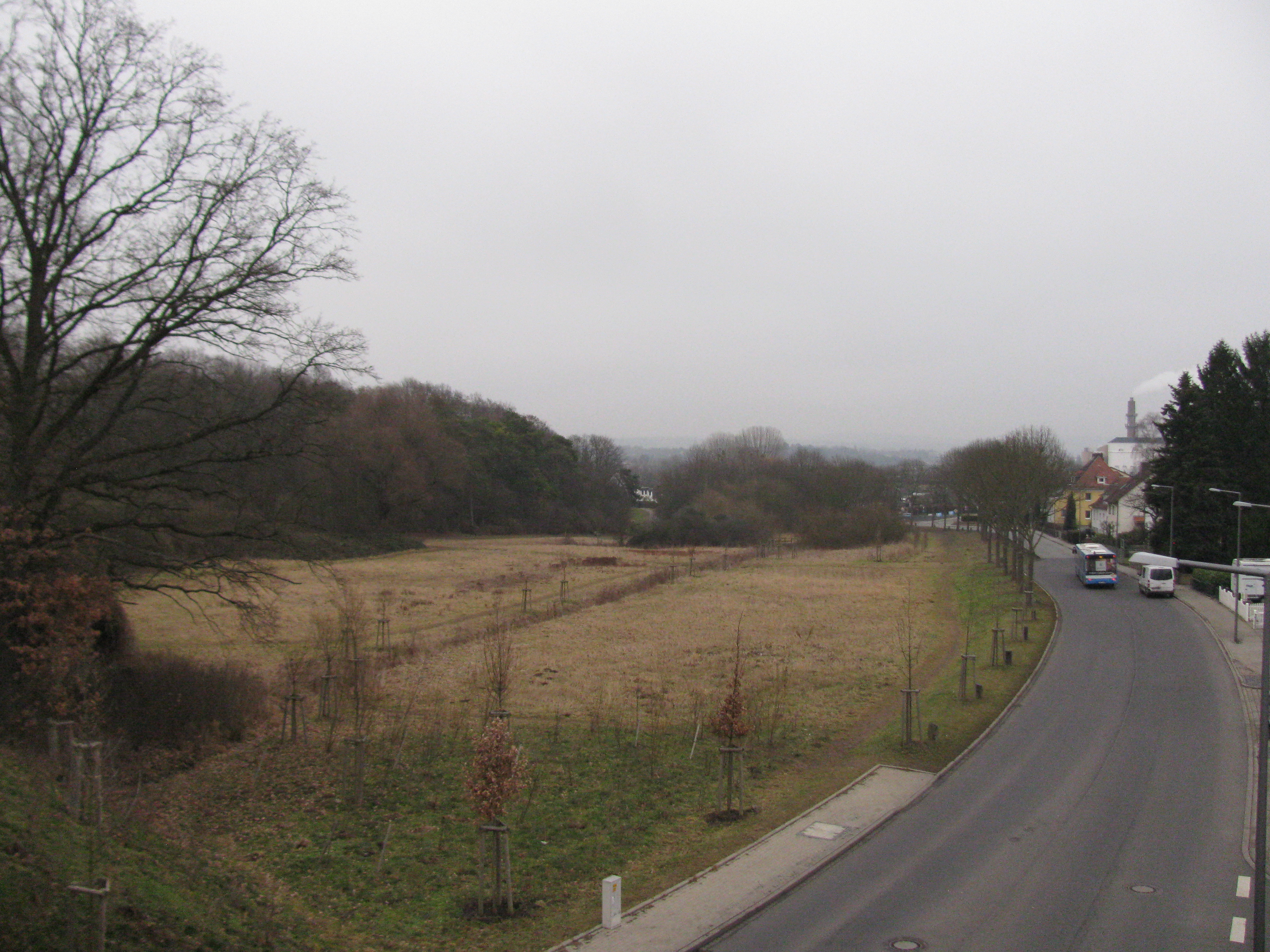

Location
- Country: Germany
- States: Hesse

Physical characteristics
- Source
  - location: Kassel district of Jungfernkopf
  - elevation: 221m Above Sea Level
- Mouth
  - location: On the border of the Kassel districts of North Holland and Philippinenhof-Warteberg into the Ahne
  - coordinates: 51.3409°N 9.4881°E
- Length: 2.8km

Basin features
- Progression: Ahne→RFulda→Weser→North Sea
- River system: Weser
- Cities: Kassel

Jungfernbach is a small river of Hesse, Germany. It flows into the Ahne in Kassel.

== History ==
The Jungfernbach, which is mostly trickle-like, rises in the western part of the Kassel district of Jungfernkopf, which lies on and on the partly park-like wooded Jungfernkopf, the southeastern slope of the Vellmar Osterberg (258.2 m) in Kassel. Its source lies in the sewer system approximately under the intersection of the streets Kornblumenweg/Am Ziegenberg at around (221 m above sea level). A street running parallel to the street Am Ziegenberg in the residential area above its origin, which has been built since about 2000, is called Zum Jungfernbach.

The catchment area above the source of the Jungfernbach extends along the road Am Ziegenberg in a northwesterly direction up to the hilltop of the Lambert (approx. 292 m) in the northeastern foothills of the Hoher Habichtswald.

In a west-east direction, the Jungfernbach, which already flows in sections in the sewer system in its upper reaches, runs through areas of the district of the same name located south below the Jungfernkopf. The stream bed, which in some places is also above ground between houses in the district, is often dry. The stream flows approximately along the street Am Ziegenberg and then a little southwest parallel to Waldecker Straße, passing the Jungfernkopf church (approx. 201 m), which was consecrated in 1954, at stream kilometre 2.1 directly to the southwest.

At the end of Waldecker Straße, at an altitude of about 189 m, the Jungfernbach first crosses under the Eisenbahnweg road running in front of it and then – near the Jungfernkopf RegioTram stop, which opened in 2008 – at kilometre 1.6 of the stream an embankment of the Kassel–Warburg railway. A few metres southwest of the stream passage there, Waldecker Straße leads through a railway embankment bridge opened in 2012 to meet the Schenkebier Stanne street directly afterwards.

Then the Jungfernbach runs southeast of the Jungfernkopf and north to northeast of the Rothenberg (207.3 m) a few metres north along the Schenkebier Stanne road through the floodplain of the Jungfernwiese, lined with forest, built-up area and allotments, where at an altitude of about 184 m an unnamed trickle flows in from the northwest and forms a pond in the estuary.

Subsequently, the Jungfernbach – again disappearing into the sewer system – crosses under numerous railway bridges between stream kilometres 1.1 and 0.9 in the sewer system of the Schenkebier Stanne at an altitude of about 175 m, over which, among other things, the Hanover–Kassel–Würzburg high-speed line runs. Between the bridges, the flowing water passes the Wau-Mau-Insel animal shelter directly north of this road, which worked closely with the animal program Herrchen gesucht, which was broadcast by hr television from 1975 to 2008.

Immediately after these bridges, the Jungfernbach leaves the area of the Kassel district of Jungfernkopf and continues to flow into the northern part of the Rothenditmold district in the sewer system of the Schenkebier Stanne, passing the Mittelfeld plant of the Henschel-Werke to the north; directly southwest of it is the Mercedes-Benz plant in Kassel.

A few metres northeast of the Mittelfeld plant, the Jungfernbach crosses at stream kilometre 0.4 under the intersection (166.8 m) of the Schenkebier Stanne-Bunsenstraße and Holländische Straße on the border of the districts of Rothenditmold and North Holland, which in this section forms a common section of the B 7 and B 83 and connects Kassel and Vellmar; at the intersection is the public transport stop Holländische Straße. From then on, the stream runs in the North Holland district in the sewer system of Bunsenstraße. It then crosses under the latter road near the intersection (160.5 m height) of this road with Niedervellmarer Straße.

A few metres below it, after leaving the municipal sewer system, the Jungfernbach flows at an altitude of about 156m into the Fulda tributary Ahne, which flows in from the north-northwest and runs along the border of the Kassel districts of North Holland and Philippinenhof-Warteberg, which shortly afterwards crosses under Gahrenbergstraße.

Natural spatial assignment The Jungfernbach flows entirely in the main natural unit group West Hessian Uplands (West Hessian Uplands and Depressions; No. 34) and in the main unit West Hessian Depression (343) through the Kassel Basin subunit (343.3).

== Protected landscape area ==
Between the Kassel–Warburg railway and the railway bridges, over which the Hanover–Kassel–Würzburg high-speed line runs, the Jungfernbach flows in the floodplain of the Jungfernwiese through parts of the landscape conservation area (LSG) Stadt Kassel (CDDA no. 378517; designated in 1995; 19.8386 km² in size), in which its mouth also lies.

== See also ==
- List of rivers of Hesse
