= Erzbach (Osterbach) =

River in Germany

Location
- Country: Germany
- State: Hesse
- District: Odenwaldkreis

Physical characteristics
- Source
  - location: Reichelsheim / Odenwald (Erzbach)
- Mouth
  - location: Osterbach
  - coordinates: 49.6856°N 8.8603°E
- Length: ~ 2.8 km

Basin features
- Progression: Osterbach→ Gersprenz→ Main→ Rhine→ North Sea
- River system: Brook

Erzbach is a small river of Hesse, Germany. It flows into the Osterbach near Unter-Ostern.

== See also ==
- List of rivers of Hesse
