= Rohrbach (Osterbach) =

River in Germany

Location
- Country: Germany
- States: Hesse

Physical characteristics
- Mouth
  - location: Osterbach
  - coordinates: 49.6934°N 8.8623°E

Basin features
- Progression: Osterbach→ Gersprenz→ Main→ Rhine→ North Sea

Rohrbach is a small river of Hesse, Germany. It is a right tributary of the Osterbach in Unter-Ostern.

== See also ==
- List of rivers of Hesse
