= Windbach =

River in Germany

Location
- Country: Germany
- State: Hesse

Physical characteristics
- Mouth
  - location: Aar
  - coordinates: 50°15′24″N 8°03′30″E

Basin features
- Progression: Aar→ Lahn→ Rhine→ North Sea

Windbach is a small river of Hesse, Germany. It flows into the Aar near Aarbergen. Rising in the western Taunus foothills near Kettenbach (50°14′53″N 8°06′54″E), this third-order stream flows southeast through a predominantly agricultural catchment before its confluence with the Aar at Aarbergen (50°14′53″N 8°06′54″E). With an average discharge of 0.12 m³/s and a gradient of 1.8%, the Windbach exhibits a pluvial-nival flow regime characteristic of mid-altitude Central European streams. Its riparian zone supports typical floodplain vegetation communities dominated by Alnus glutinosa (European alder) and Salix spp. (willows), as documented in Hesse's small watercourse monitoring program.

== See also ==
- List of rivers of Hesse
