= Bizzenbach =

River in Germany

Location
- Country: Germany
- State: Hesse

Physical characteristics
- Mouth
  - location: Erlenbach
  - coordinates: 50.2926°N 8.5754°E

Basin features
- Progression: Erlenbach→ Nidda→ Main→ Rhine→ North Sea

The Bizzenbach is a 4 km long low mountain stream of Hesse, Germany. It rises in the Taunus and flows into the Erlenbach in Wehrheim.

== See also ==
- List of rivers of Hesse
