= Geisbach =

River in Germany

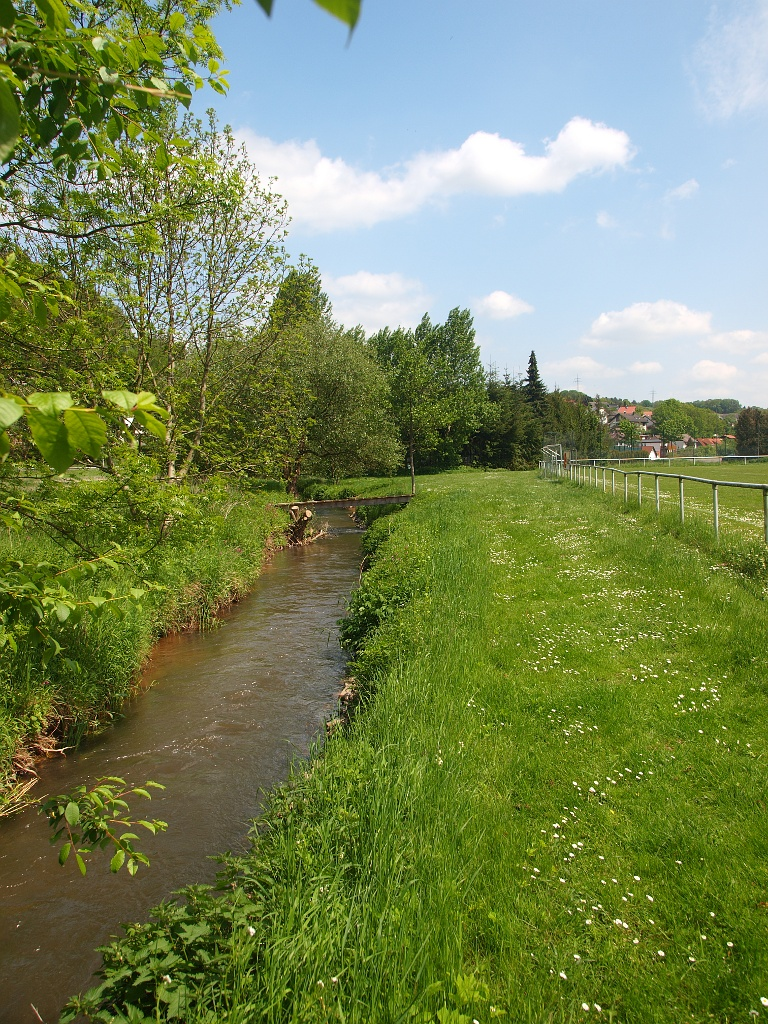

Location
- Country: Germany
- State: Hesse

Physical characteristics
- Mouth
  - location: Fulda
  - coordinates: 50.8631°N 9.7157°E
- Length: 22.2 km (13.8 mi)

Basin features
- Progression: Fulda→ Weser→ North Sea

Geisbach is a river of Hesse, Germany. It flows into the Fulda in Bad Hersfeld.

== See also ==
- List of rivers of Hesse
