= Benzenbach =

River in Germany

Location
- Country: Germany
- State: Hesse

Physical characteristics
- Mouth
  - location: Mergbach
  - coordinates: 49.7006°N 8.8232°E

Basin features
- Progression: Mergbach→ Gersprenz→ Main→ Rhine→ North Sea

The Benzenbach is a small river of Hesse, Germany. It is a right tributary of the Mergbach and flows into it near the village of Groß-Gumpen in the municipality of Reichelsheim.

== See also ==
- List of rivers of Hesse
