= Kinzig (Mümling) =

River in Germany

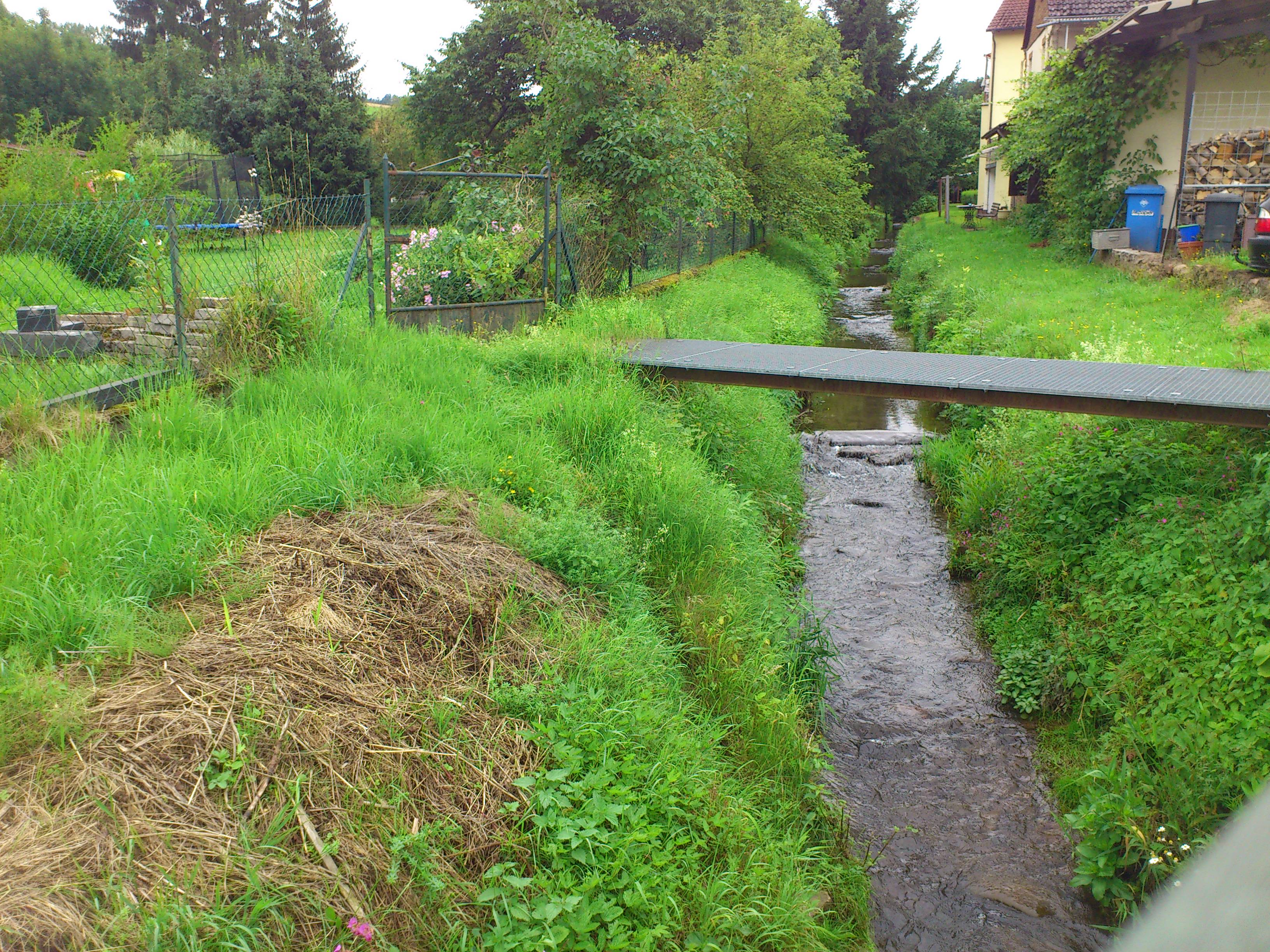

Location
- Country: Germany
- States: Hesse

Physical characteristics
- Mouth
  - location: Mümling
  - coordinates: 49.7597°N 8.9959°E

Basin features
- Progression: Mümling→ Main→ Rhine→ North Sea

Kinzig (German pronunciation: [ˈkɪntsɪç]) is a small river of Hesse, Germany. It flows into the Mümling near Bad König.

== See also ==
- List of rivers of Hesse
