= Vierbach =

River in Germany

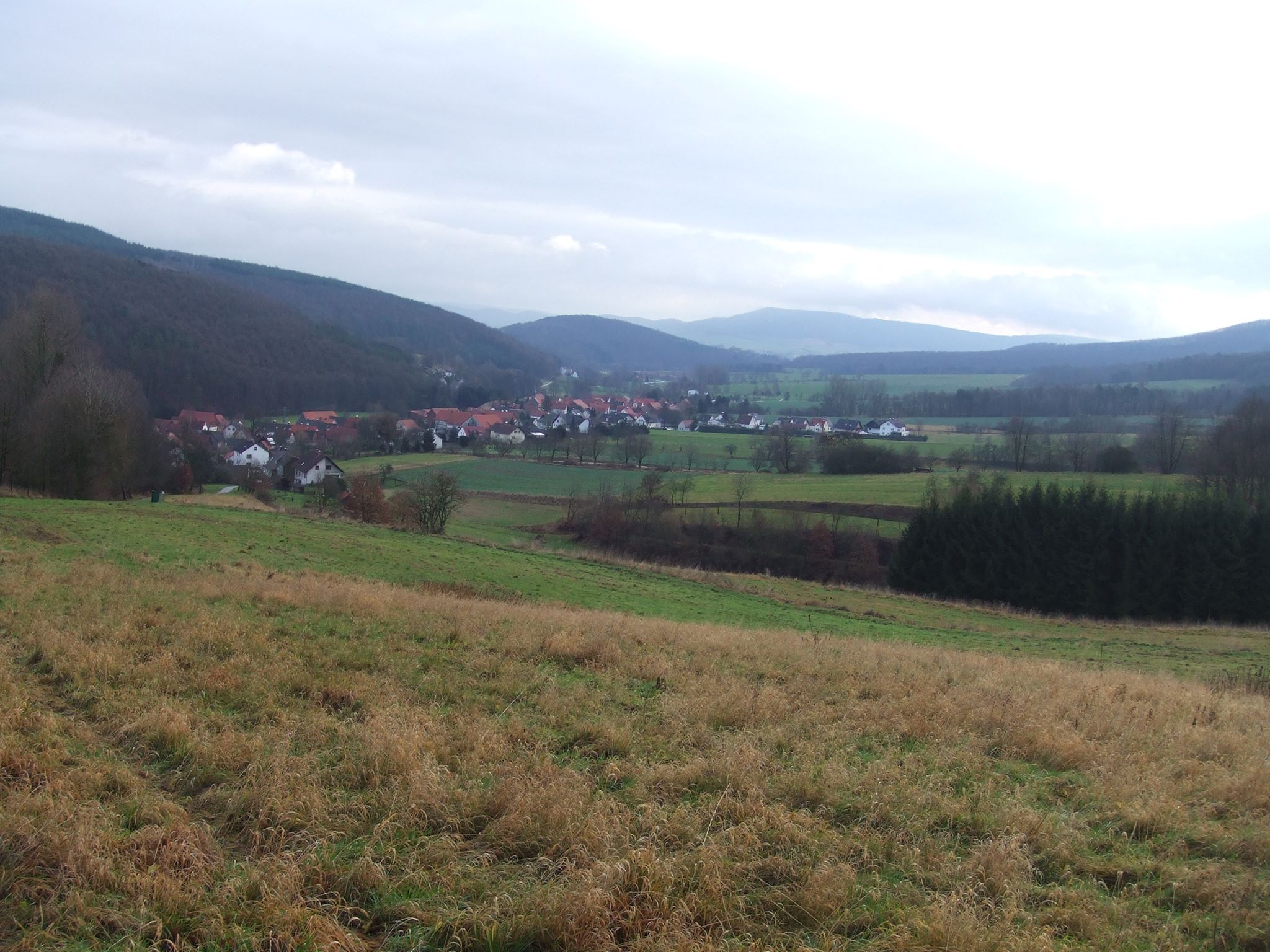

Location
- Country: Germany
- State: Hesse

Physical characteristics
- Mouth
  - location: Wehre
  - coordinates: 51.1579°N 9.9931°E
- Length: 12.6 km (7.8 mi)

Basin features
- Progression: Wehre→ Werra→ Weser→ North Sea

Vierbach is a river of Hesse, Germany. It is a left tributary of the Wehre in Reichensachsen.

== See also ==
- List of rivers of Hesse
