= Bentreff =

River in Germany

Location
- Country: Germany
- State: Hesse

Physical characteristics
- Mouth
  - location: Wohra
  - coordinates: 50.9357°N 8.9491°E
- Length: 13.1 km (8.1 mi)

Basin features
- Progression: Wohra→ Ohm→ Lahn→ Rhine→ North Sea

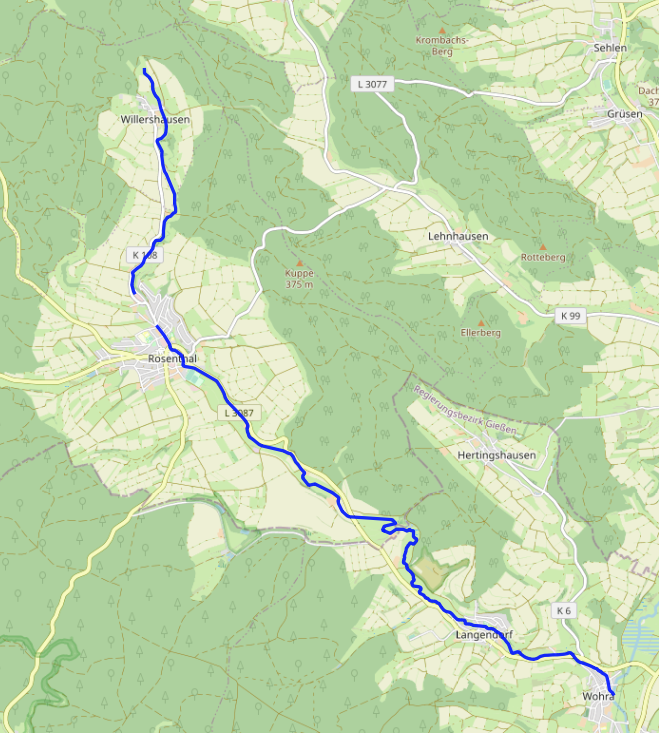
Course of the River Bentreff

The Bentreff is a river of Hesse, Germany. It flows into the Wohra on the right bank in Wohratal.

== See also ==
- List of rivers of Hesse
