= Schellenbach =

River in Germany

Location
- Country: Germany
- States: Hesse

Physical characteristics
- Mouth
  - location: Hirtenbach
  - coordinates: 50.5438°N 9.0102°E

Basin features
- Progression: Hirtenbach→ Wetter→ Nidda→ Main→ Rhine→ North Sea

Schellenbach is a small river of Hesse, Germany. It flows into the Hirtenbach near Laubach. It is 3.5 km (2.17 mi) wide.

== See also ==
- List of rivers of Hesse
