= Schifflache =

River in Germany

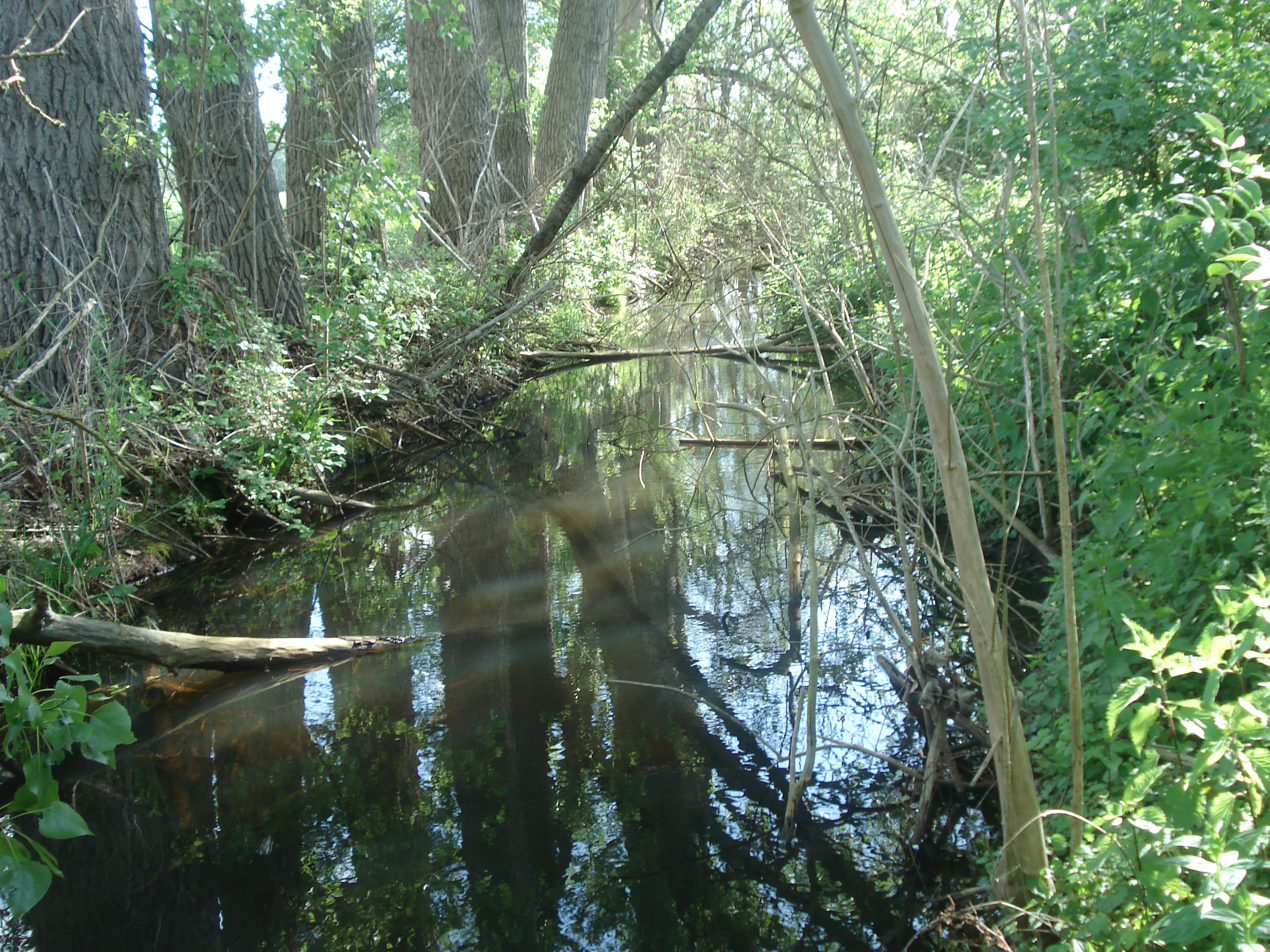

Location
- Country: Germany
- States: Hesse

Physical characteristics
- Mouth
  - location: Main
  - coordinates: 50.1008°N 8.9426°E

Basin features
- Progression: Main→ Rhine→ North Sea

Schifflache is a small river of Hesse, Germany. It flows into the Main south of Hanau.

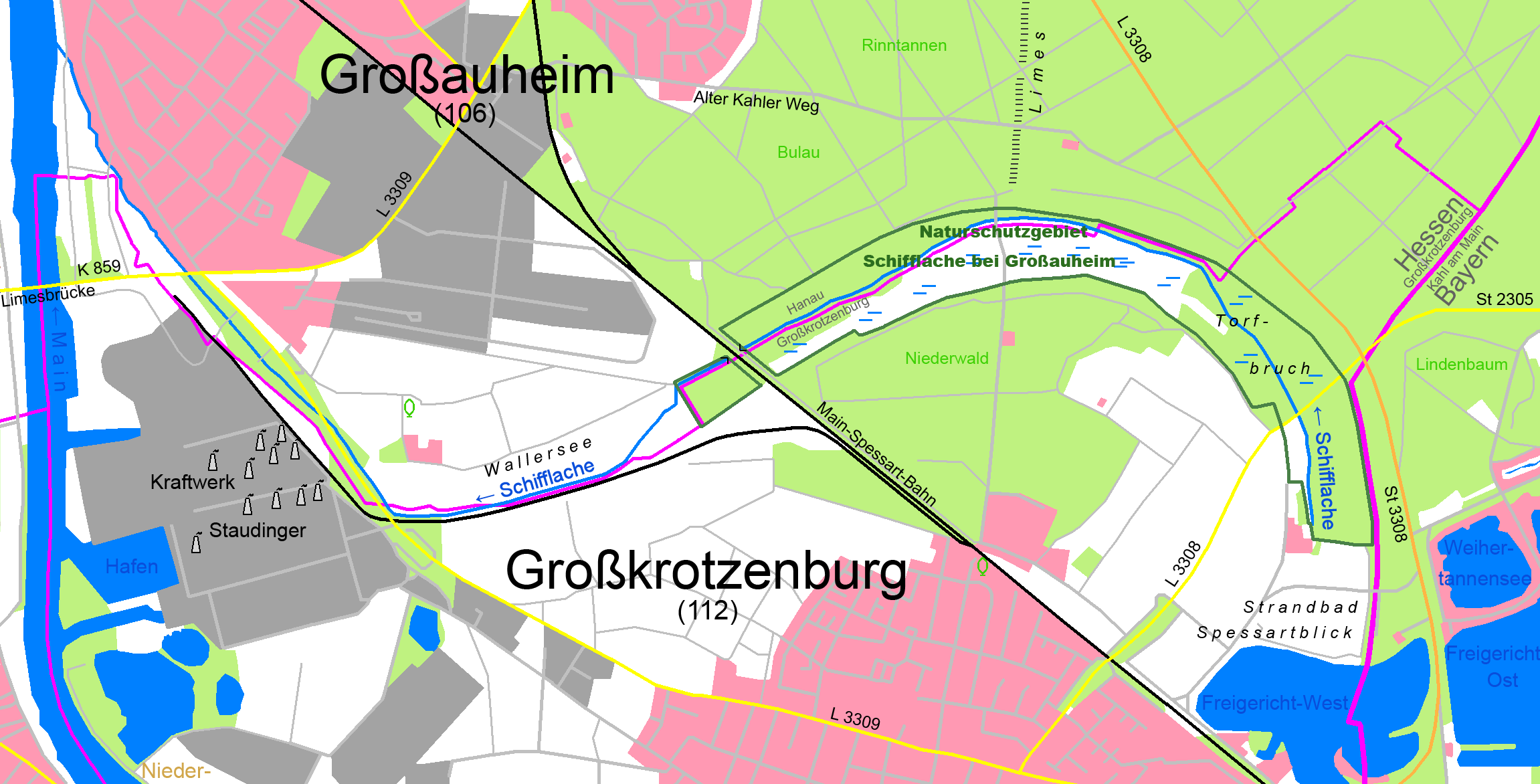
Map of Schifflache

== See also ==
- List of rivers of Hesse
