= Vockebach =

River in Germany

Location
- Country: Germany
- State: Hesse

Physical characteristics
- Mouth
  - location: Pfieffe
  - coordinates: 51.1113°N 9.7033°E
- Length: 11.8 km (7.3 mi)

Basin features
- Progression: Pfieffe→ Fulda→ Weser→ North Sea

Vockebach is a river of Hesse, Germany. It flows into the Pfieffe near Spangenberg.

== See also ==
- List of rivers of Hesse
