= Schmalnau =

River in Germany

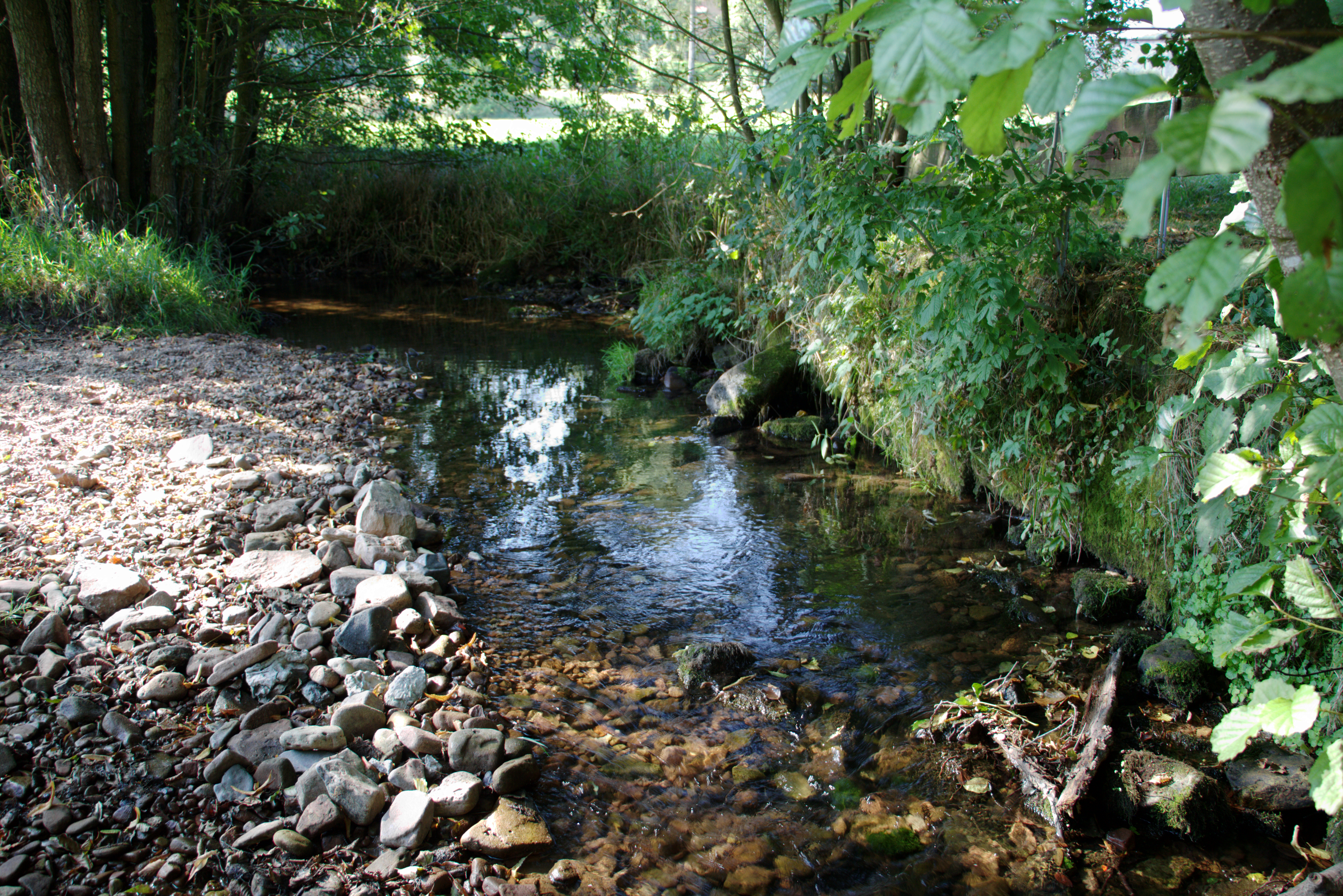

Location
- Country: Germany
- State: Hesse

Physical characteristics
- Mouth
  - location: Fulda
  - coordinates: 50.4539°N 9.7922°E
- Length: 10.7 km (6.6 mi)

Basin features
- Progression: Fulda→ Weser→ North Sea

Schmalnau is a river of Hesse, Germany. It flows into the Fulda in Ebersburg.

== See also ==
- List of rivers of Hesse
