= Ohebach (Kehrenbach) =

River in Germany

Location
- Country: Germany
- State: Hesse

Physical characteristics
- Source
  - location: near Hessisch Lichtenau
  - coordinates: 51.1831°N 9.6873°E
- Mouth
  - location: near Kirchhof
  - coordinates: 51.1461°N 9.6151°E

Ohebach is a river of Hesse, Germany. It is a left tributary of the Kehrenbach.

== See also ==
- List of rivers of Hesse
