= Käsbach =

River in Germany

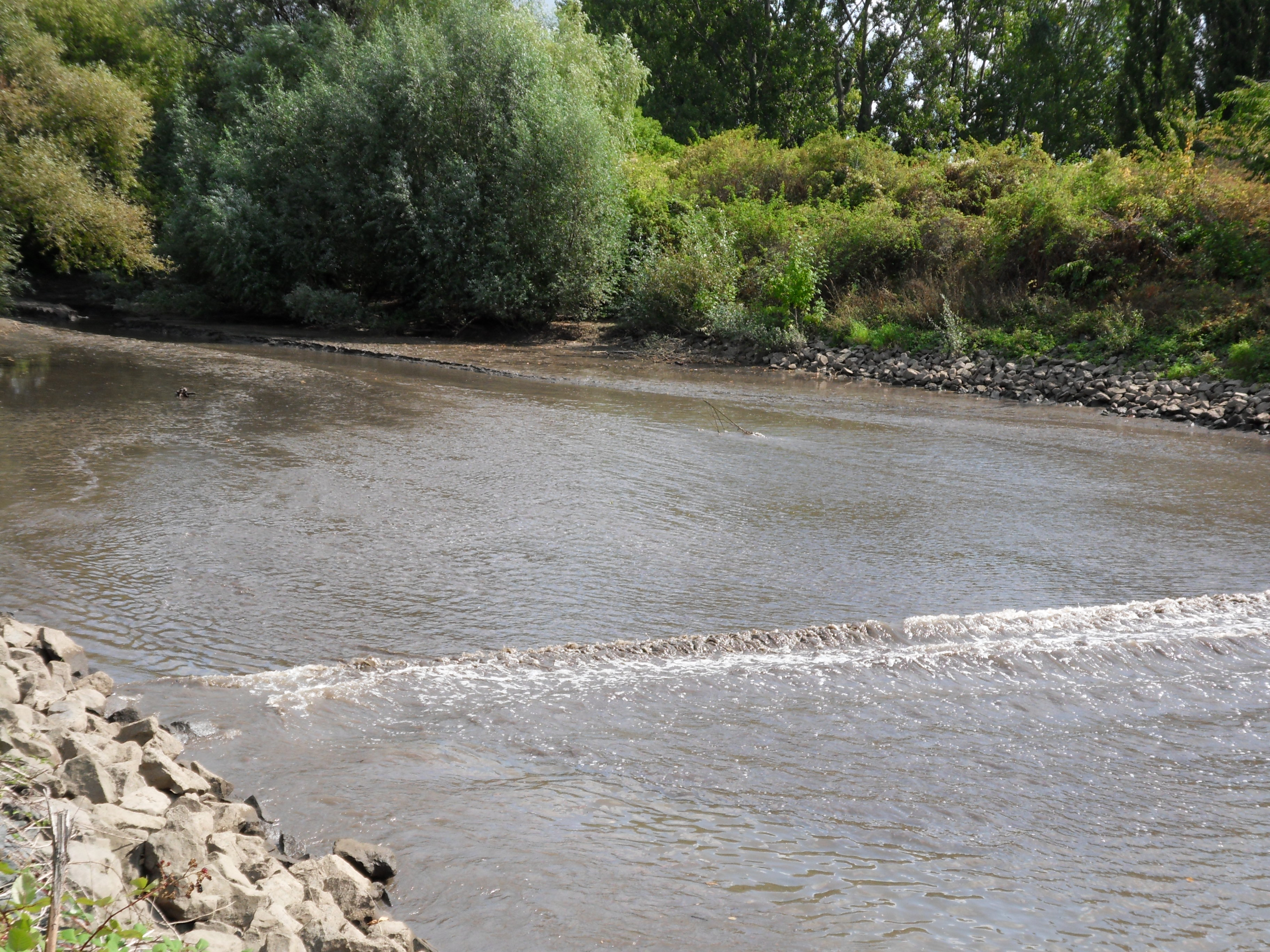

Location
- Country: Germany
- States: Hesse

Physical characteristics
- Source
  - coordinates: 50°02′36″N 8°19′54″E
- Mouth
  - location: Main
  - coordinates: 50.0034°N 8.3160°E

Basin features
- Progression: Main→ Rhine→ North Sea

The Käsbach is a small river of Hesse, Germany. It flows into the Main as a right tributary in Kostheim.

== See also ==
- List of rivers of Hesse
