= Welzbach (Main) =

River in Germany

- The Welzbach in Großostheim

Location
- Country: Germany
- States: Hesse and Bavaria

Physical characteristics
- Mouth
  - location: Main
  - coordinates: 49.9682°N 9.1061°E
- Length: 18.3 km (11.4 mi)

Basin features
- Progression: Main→ Rhine→ North Sea

Welzbach (in its upper course: Pflaumbach) is a river of Hesse and Bavaria, Germany. It is a left tributary of the Main at the district Leider of Aschaffenburg.

== See also ==
- List of rivers of Hesse
- List of rivers of Bavaria
