= Weilbach (Main) =

River in Germany

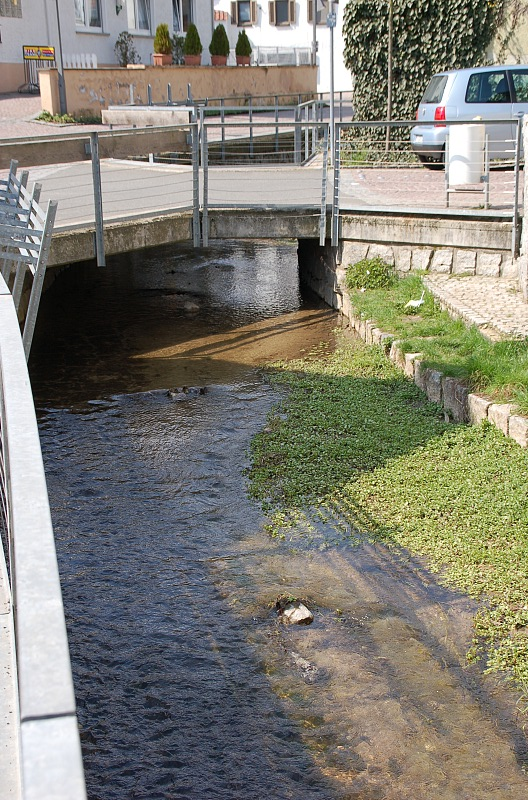

Location
- Country: Germany
- State: Hesse

Physical characteristics
- Mouth
  - location: Main
  - coordinates: 50.0192°N 8.4526°E
- Length: 14.0 km (8.7 mi)

Basin features
- Progression: Main→ Rhine→ North Sea

Weilbach is a river of Hesse, Germany. It flows into the Main near Flörsheim am Main.

== See also ==
- List of rivers of Hesse
