= Gimbach =

River in Germany

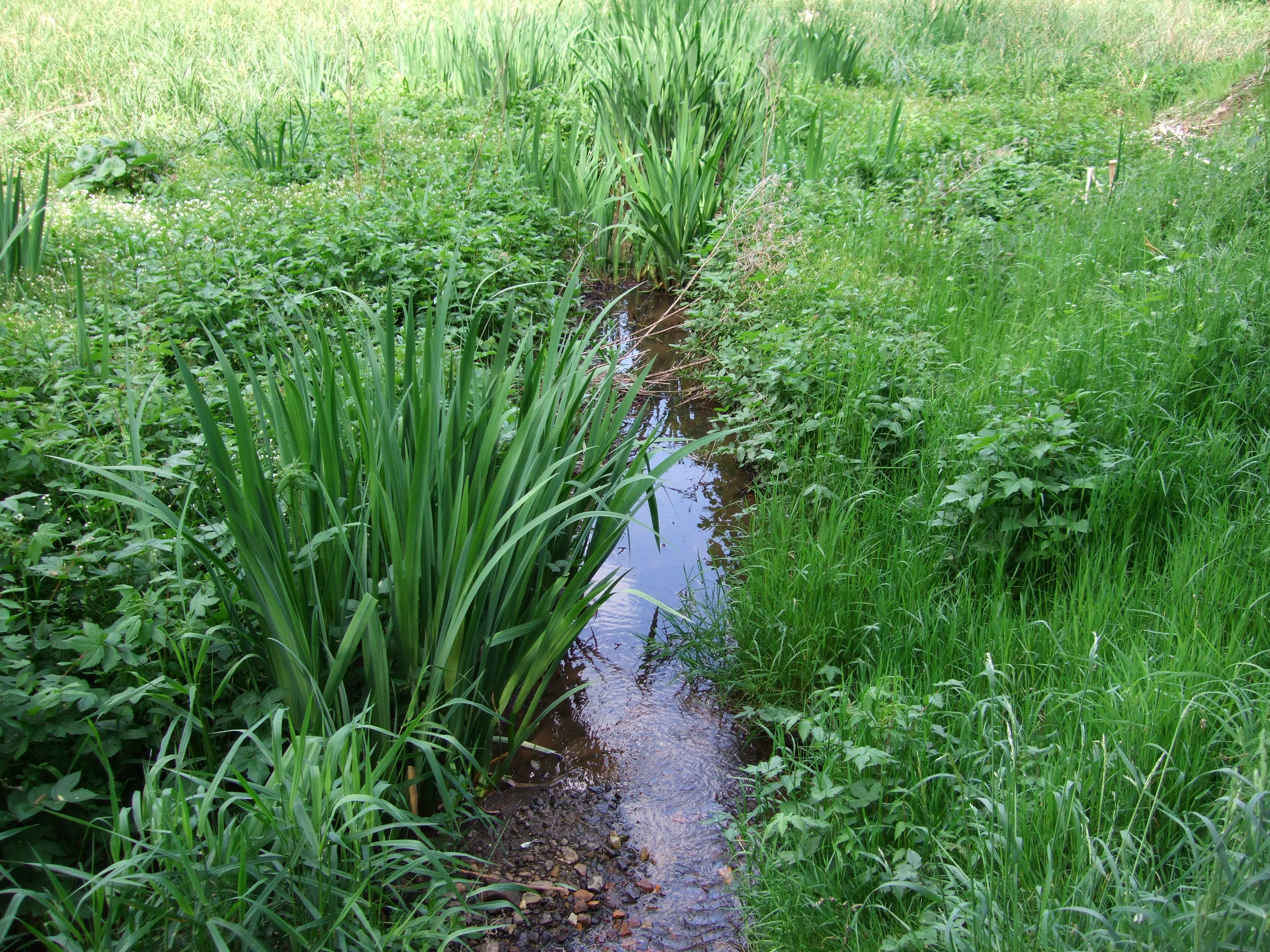

Location
- Country: Germany
- States: Hesse

Physical characteristics
- Mouth
  - location: Liederbach
  - coordinates: 50.1367°N 8.4543°E

Basin features
- Progression: Liederbach→ Main→ Rhine→ North Sea

Gimbach is a small river of Hesse, Germany. It flows into the Liederbach in Kelkheim.

== See also ==
- List of rivers of Hesse
