= Hillersbach =

River in Germany

Location
- Country: Germany
- State: Hesse

Physical characteristics
- Mouth
  - location: Nidder
  - coordinates: 50.3733°N 9.0849°E
- Length: 19.9 km (12.4 mi)

Basin features
- Progression: Nidder→ Nidda→ Main→ Rhine→ North Sea
- Tributaries
  - right: Erlenbach

The Hillersbach is a river of Hesse, Germany. It is a right-bank tributary of the Nidder, into which it flows in Lißberg.

== See also ==
- List of rivers of Hesse
