= Marbach (Mergbach) =

River in Germany

Location
- Country: Germany
- States: Hesse

Physical characteristics
- Mouth
  - location: Mergbach
  - coordinates: 49.6909°N 8.8154°E

Basin features
- Progression: Mergbach→ Gersprenz→ Main→ Rhine→ North Sea

Marbach (German pronunciation: [ˈmaʁbax]) is a small river of Hesse, Germany. It flows into the Mergbach in Gumpen.

== Geography ==
The Marbach originates in the Vorderer Odenwald within a forested area west of the Stotz (478.1 m above sea level). It initially flows in a northwestward direction. In Reichelsheim-Groß-Gumpen, it passes beneath Federal Highways B47 and B38, locally known as Kriemhildstraße, and a few meters further downstream it flows into the Mergbach.

== See also ==
- List of rivers of Hesse
