= Norde (Gilsa) =

River in Germany

Location
- Country: Germany
- State: Hesse

Physical characteristics
- Source
  - location: near Battenhausen, a district of Haina
  - coordinates: 51.0243°N 9.0296°E
- Mouth
  - location: near Schönstein, a district of Gilserberg
  - coordinates: 50.9871°N 9.0750°E

Norde is a river of Hesse, Germany. It is a left tributary of the Gilsa.

== See also ==
- List of rivers of Hesse
