= Irrbach =

River in Germany

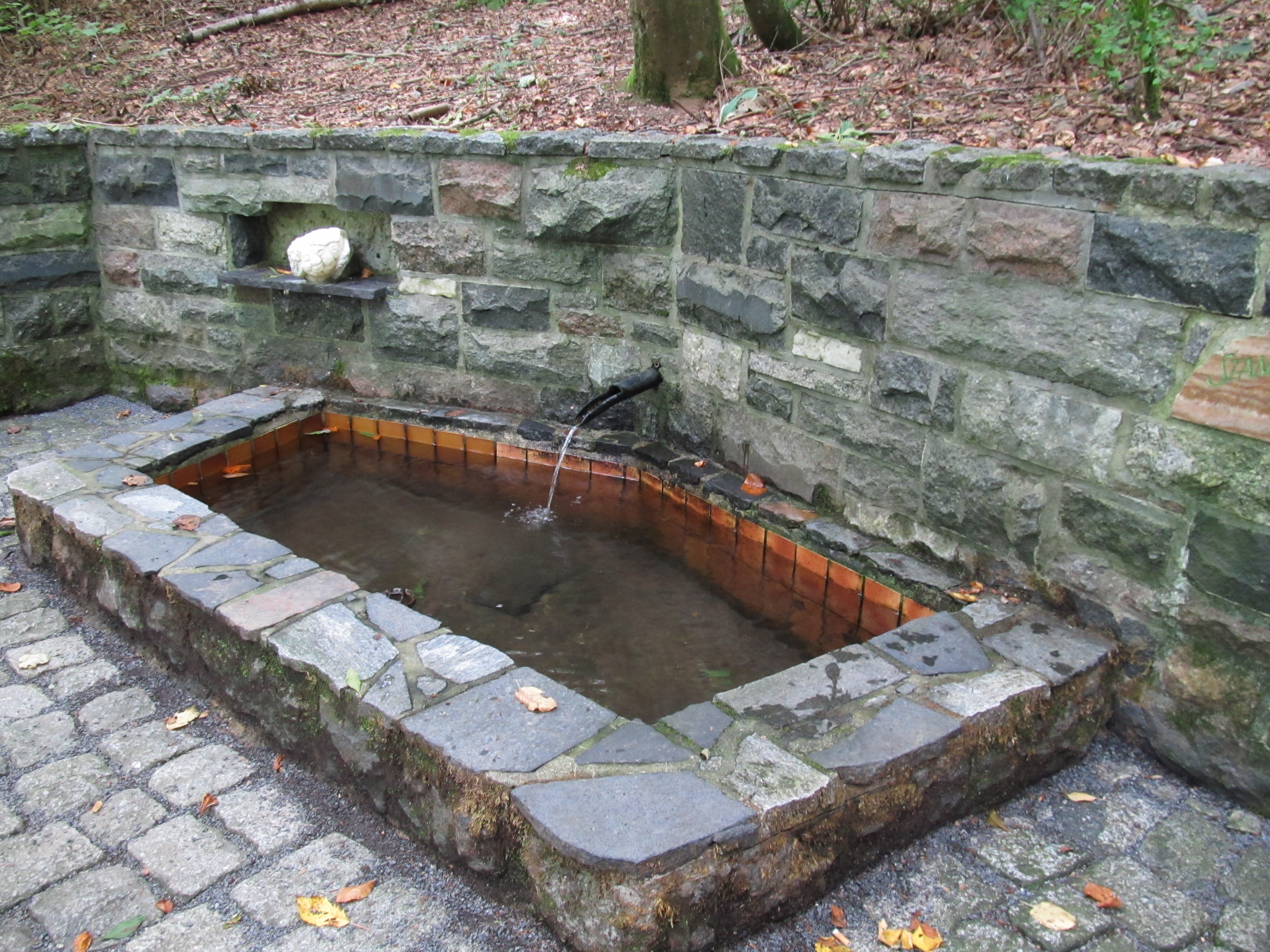

Location
- Country: Germany
- States: Hesse

Physical characteristics
- Mouth
  - location: Osterbach
  - coordinates: 49.6941°N 8.8598°E

Basin features
- Progression: Osterbach→ Gersprenz→ Main→ Rhine→ North Sea
- Tributaries
  - right: Lauchbach

The Irrbach is a small river of Hesse, Germany. It is a two-kilometer-long left tributary of the Osterbach, flowing into it in Unter-Ostern.

== See also ==
- List of rivers of Hesse
