= Seulbach =

River in Germany

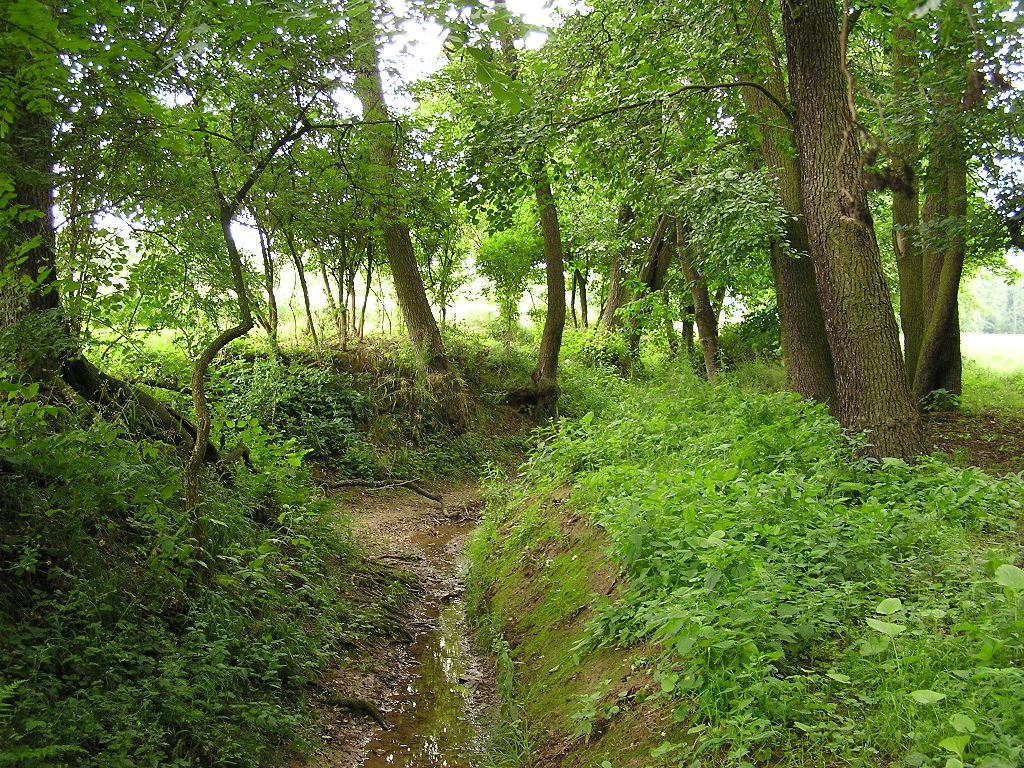

Location
- Country: Germany
- State: Hesse

Physical characteristics
- Mouth
  - location: Erlenbach
  - coordinates: 50°13′51″N 8°40′04″E

Basin features
- Progression: Erlenbach→ Nidda→ Main→ Rhine→ North Sea

Seulbach is a small river of Hesse, Germany. It flows into the Erlenbach near Ober-Erlenbach.

== See also ==
- List of rivers of Hesse
