= Dünsbergbach =

River in Germany

Location
- Country: Germany
- State: Hesse

Physical characteristics
- Mouth
  - location: Bieber
  - coordinates: 50.6385°N 8.5644°E

Basin features
- Progression: Bieber→ Lahn→ Rhine→ North Sea

Dünsbergbach is a small river of Hesse, Germany. It flows into the Bieber near Biebertal.

== See also ==
- List of rivers of Hesse
