= Thiele (Aar) =

River in Germany

Location
- Country: Germany
- State: Hesse

Physical characteristics
- Mouth
  - location: Aar
  - coordinates: 51.3656°N 9.0252°E

Basin features
- Progression: Aar→ Twiste→ Diemel→ Weser→ North Sea

Thiele is a small river of Hesse, Germany. It flows into the Aar near Bad Arolsen.

== See also ==
- List of rivers of Hesse
