= Geilebach =

River in Germany

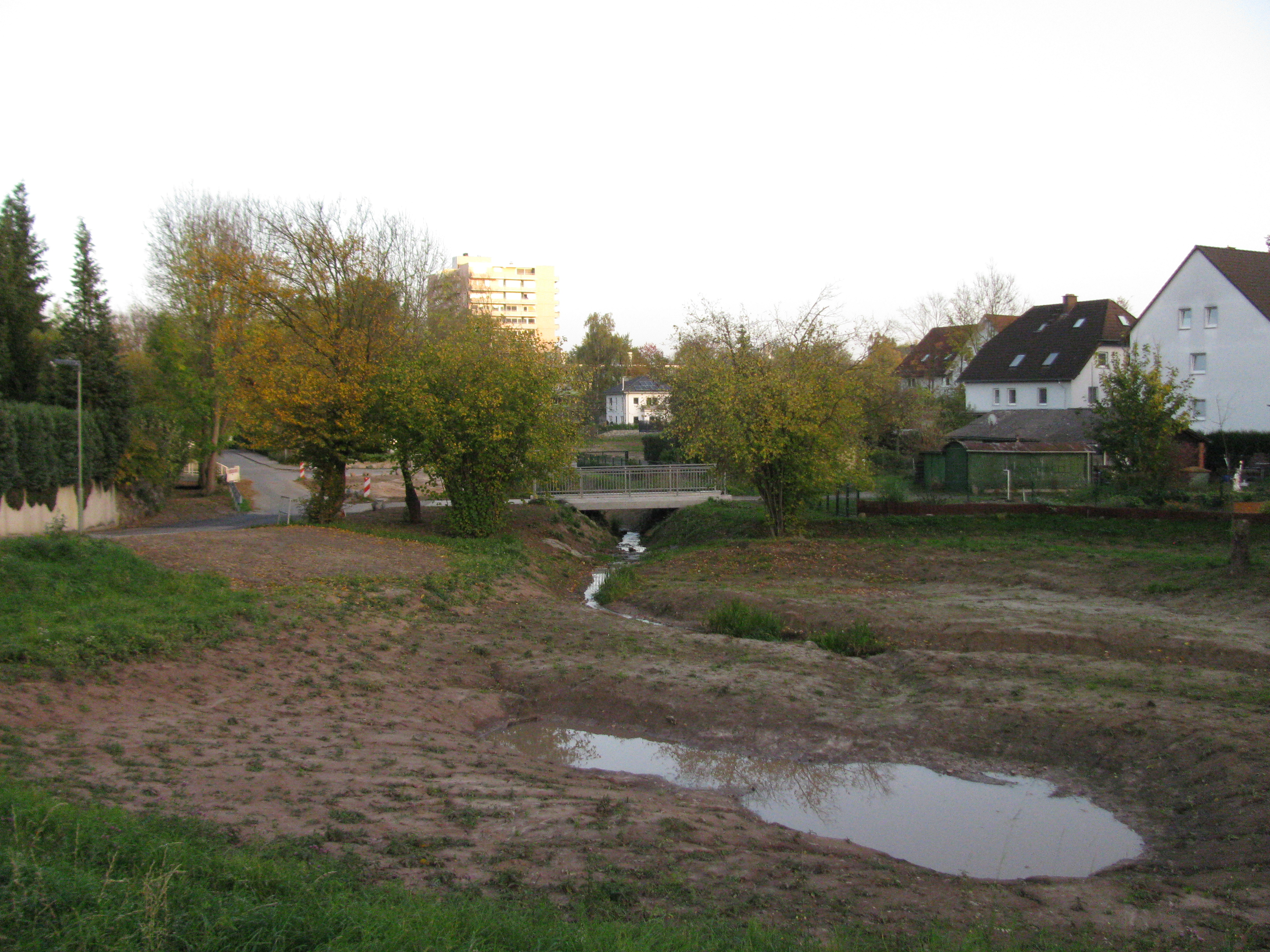

Location
- Country: Germany
- States: Hesse

Physical characteristics
- Mouth
  - location: Ahne
  - coordinates: 51.3269°N 9.5061°E

Basin features
- Progression: Ahne→ Fulda→ Weser→ North Sea

Geilebach (in its lower course: Mombach) is a small river of Hesse, Germany. It flows into the Ahne in Kassel.

== See also ==
- List of rivers of Hesse
