= Hainbach (Main) =

River in Germany

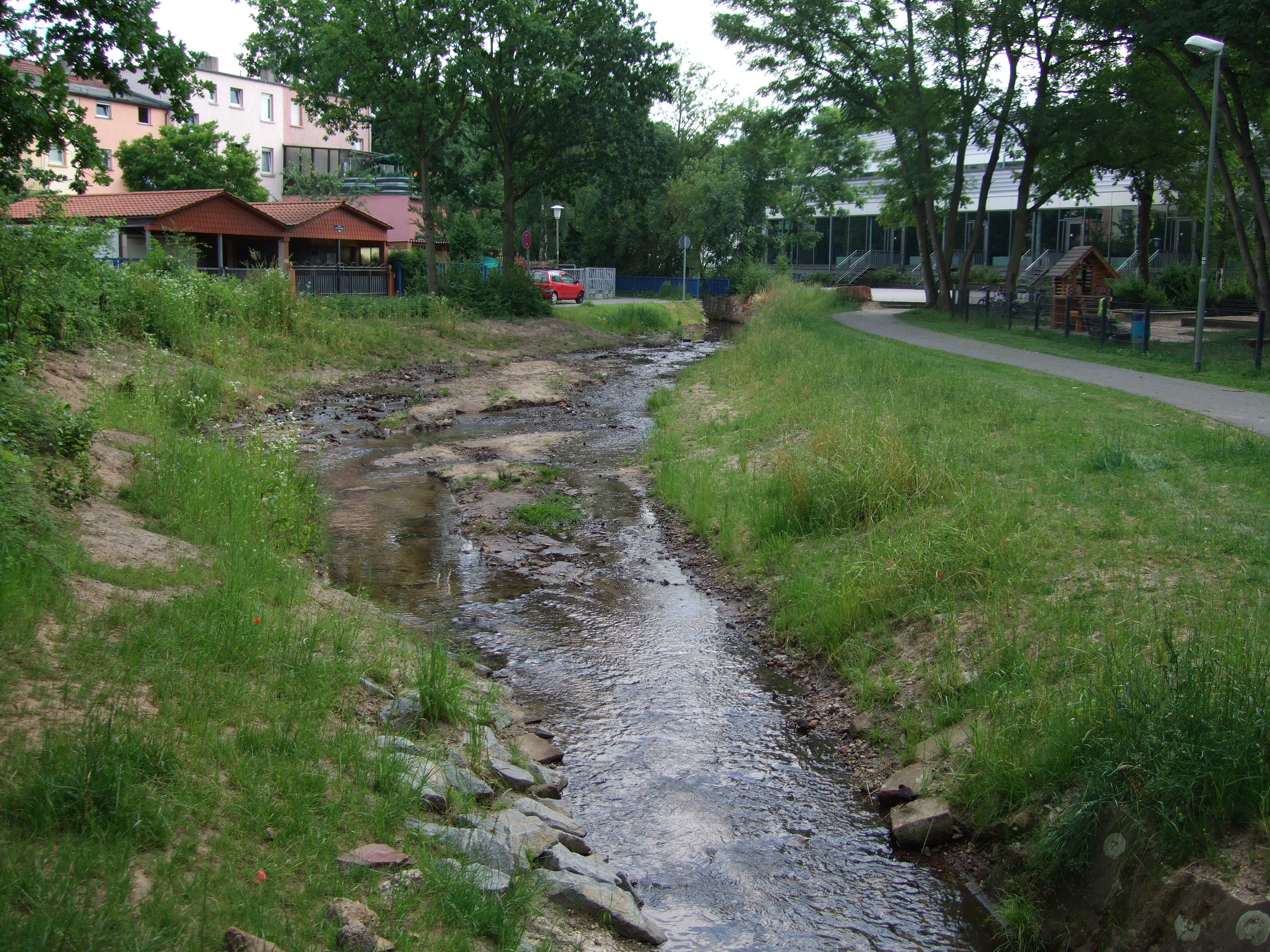

Location
- Country: Germany
- States: Hesse

Physical characteristics
- Mouth
  - location: Offenbach am Main
  - coordinates: 50.1081°N 8.7660°E

Basin features
- Progression: Main→ Rhine→ North Sea

The Hainbach is a small river of Hesse, Germany. It is a left tributary of the Main, joining it in Offenbach am Main.

== See also ==
- List of rivers of Hesse
