= Bettenbach =

River in Germany

Location
- Country: Germany
- State: Hesse

Physical characteristics
- Mouth
  - location: Aar
  - coordinates: 50°15′05″N 08°03′33″E

Basin features
- Progression: Aar→ Lahn→ Rhine→ North Sea

The Bettenbach is a small river in Hesse, Germany. It flows into the Aar (Lahn) on the left bank near Aarbergen.

== See also ==
- List of rivers of Hesse
