= Osterbach (Eder) =

River in Germany

Location
- Country: Germany
- States: Hesse

Physical characteristics
- Mouth
  - location: Eder
  - coordinates: 51.1261°N 9.2224°E

Basin features
- Progression: Eder→ Fulda→ Weser→ North Sea

Osterbach is a small river of Hesse, Germany. It is a right tributary of the Eder west of Fritzlar.

== See also ==
- List of rivers of Hesse
