= Holzgraben (Fulda) =

River in Germany

Location
- Country: Germany
- States: Hesse

Physical characteristics
- Mouth
  - location: Fulda
  - coordinates: 51.0417°N 9.6581°E

Basin features
- Progression: Fulda→ Weser→ North Sea

The Holzgraben is a 6.5 km long river of Hesse, Germany. It is a left tributary of the Fulda near Alheim. It flows through Ober- and Niederellenbach in the Hersfeld-Rotenburg district of eastern Hesse.

== See also ==
- List of rivers of Hesse
