= Boxbach =

River in Germany

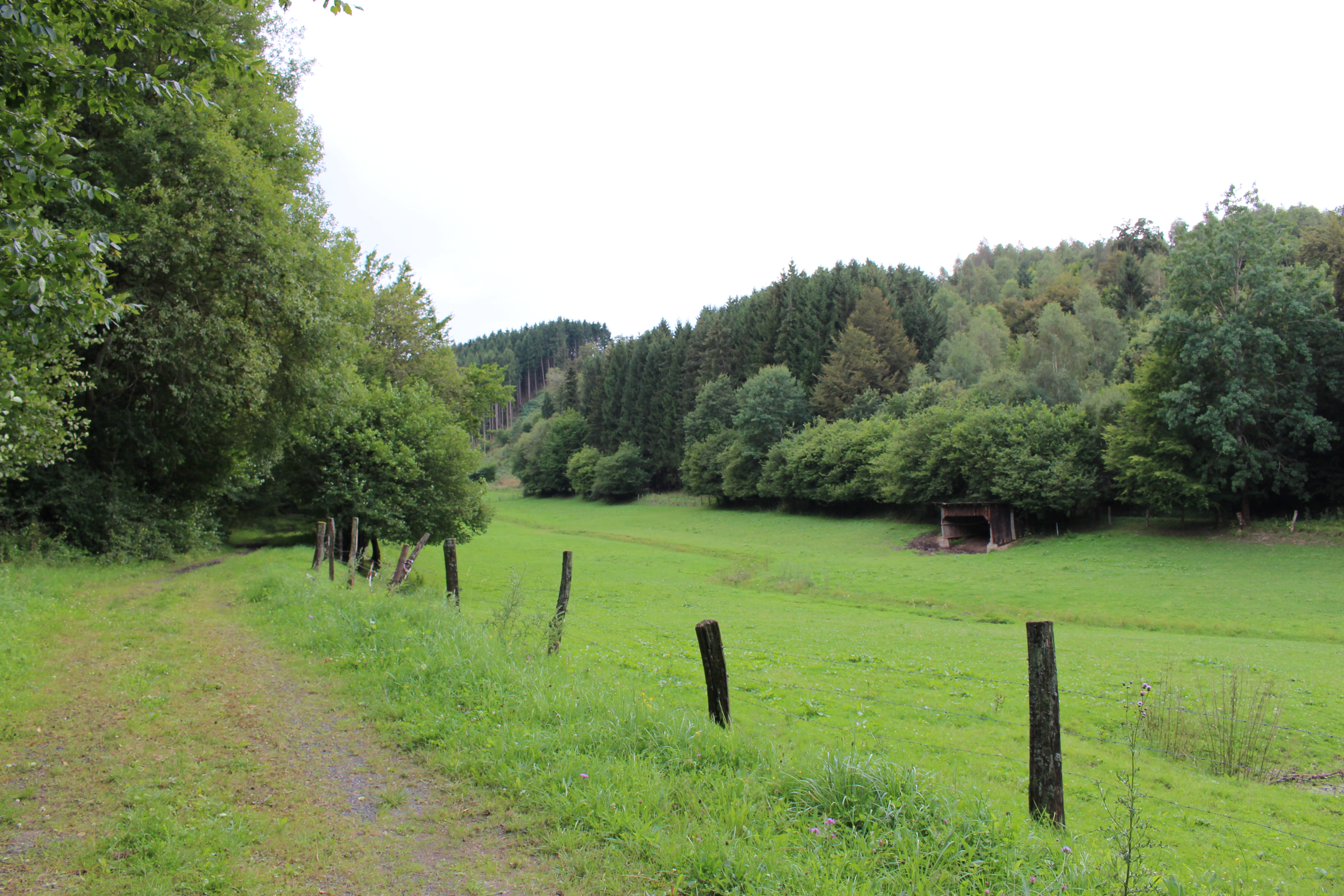

Location
- Country: Germany
- State: Hesse

Physical characteristics
- Mouth
  - location: Perf
  - coordinates: 50°53′53″N 8°27′01″E

Basin features
- Progression: Perf→ Lahn→ Rhine→ North Sea

The Boxbach (formerly also Bocksbach, dialect Buxboch) is a small river of Hesse, Germany. It is a 5.8 km long left tributary of the Perf, and flows into it in the northwest of the Gladenbach Uplands near Breidenbach. The former Boxbach mine and the Boxbach path that crosses the river are named after the river.

== See also ==
- List of rivers of Hesse
