= Grunnelbach =

River in Germany

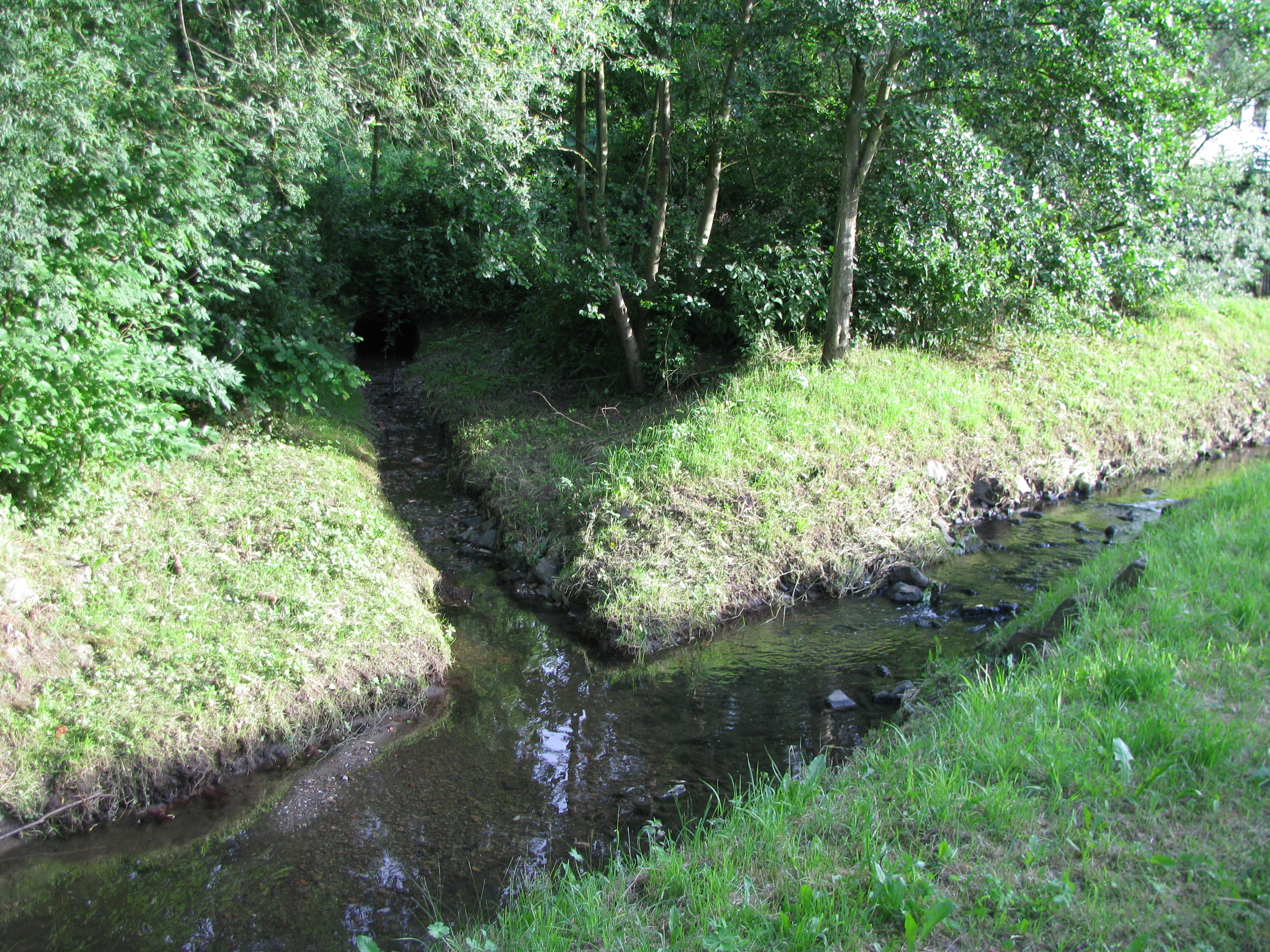
- Grunnelbach, confluence of the Eselsgraben

Location
- Country: Germany
- States: Hesse

Physical characteristics
- Mouth
  - location: Fulda
  - coordinates: 51.2869°N 9.4897°E

Basin features
- Progression: Fulda→ Weser→ North Sea

Grunnelbach is a small river of Hesse, Germany. It flows into the Fulda in Kassel.

== See also ==
- List of rivers of Hesse
