= Ernstbach =

River in Germany

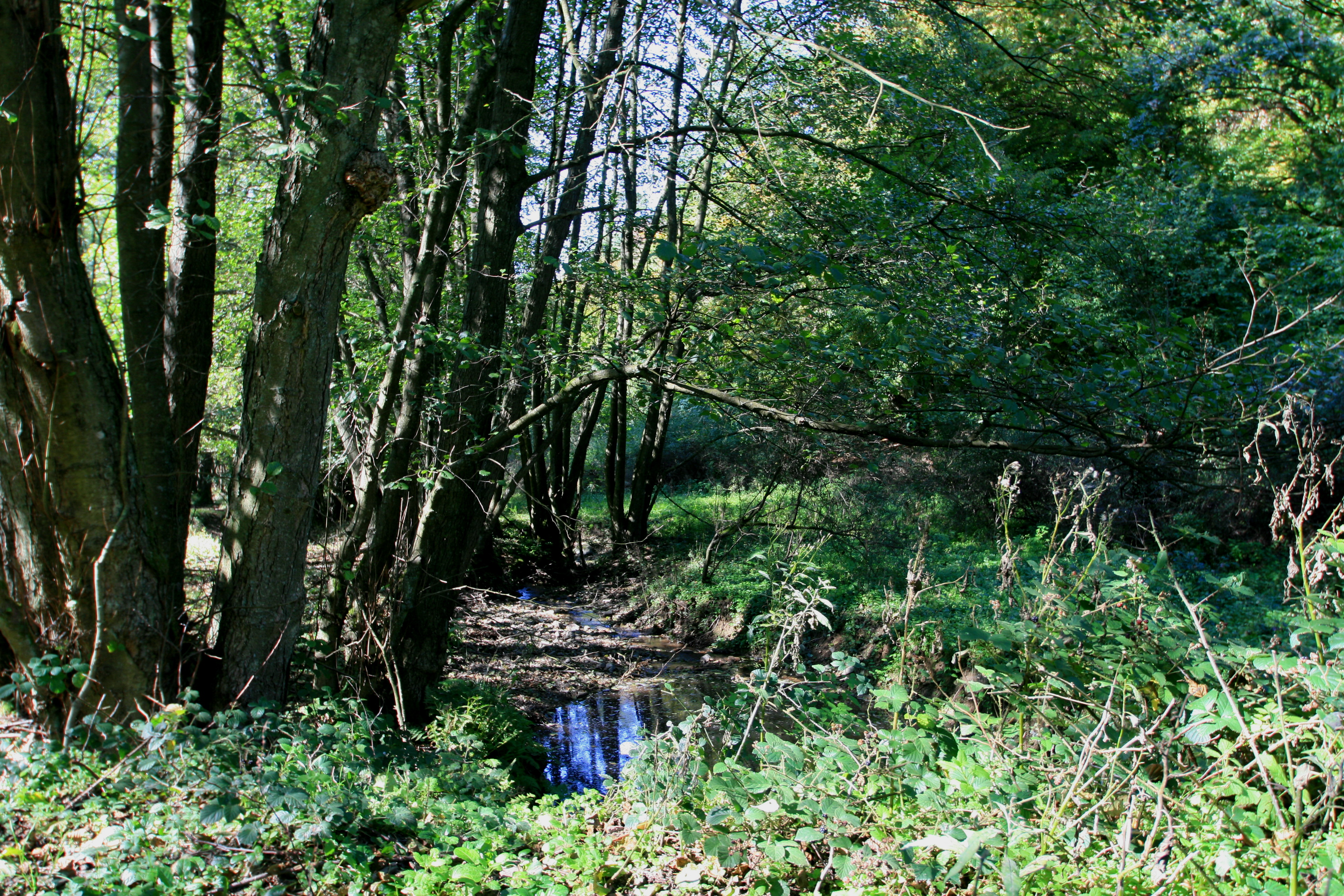

Location
- Country: Germany
- State: Hesse

Physical characteristics
- Mouth
  - location: Wisper
  - coordinates: 50.0885°N 7.9030°E
- Length: 12.5 km (7.8 mi)
- Basin size: 35.3 km^{2} (13.6 sq mi)

Basin features
- Progression: Wisper→ Rhine→ North Sea

Ernstbach is a 12.5-kilometre-long (7.8-mile) river of Hesse, Germany. It is a left tributary of the Wisper River in the Taunus mountains, part of the Rhine River system.

== See also ==
- List of rivers of Hesse
