= Espe (Fulda) =

River in Germany

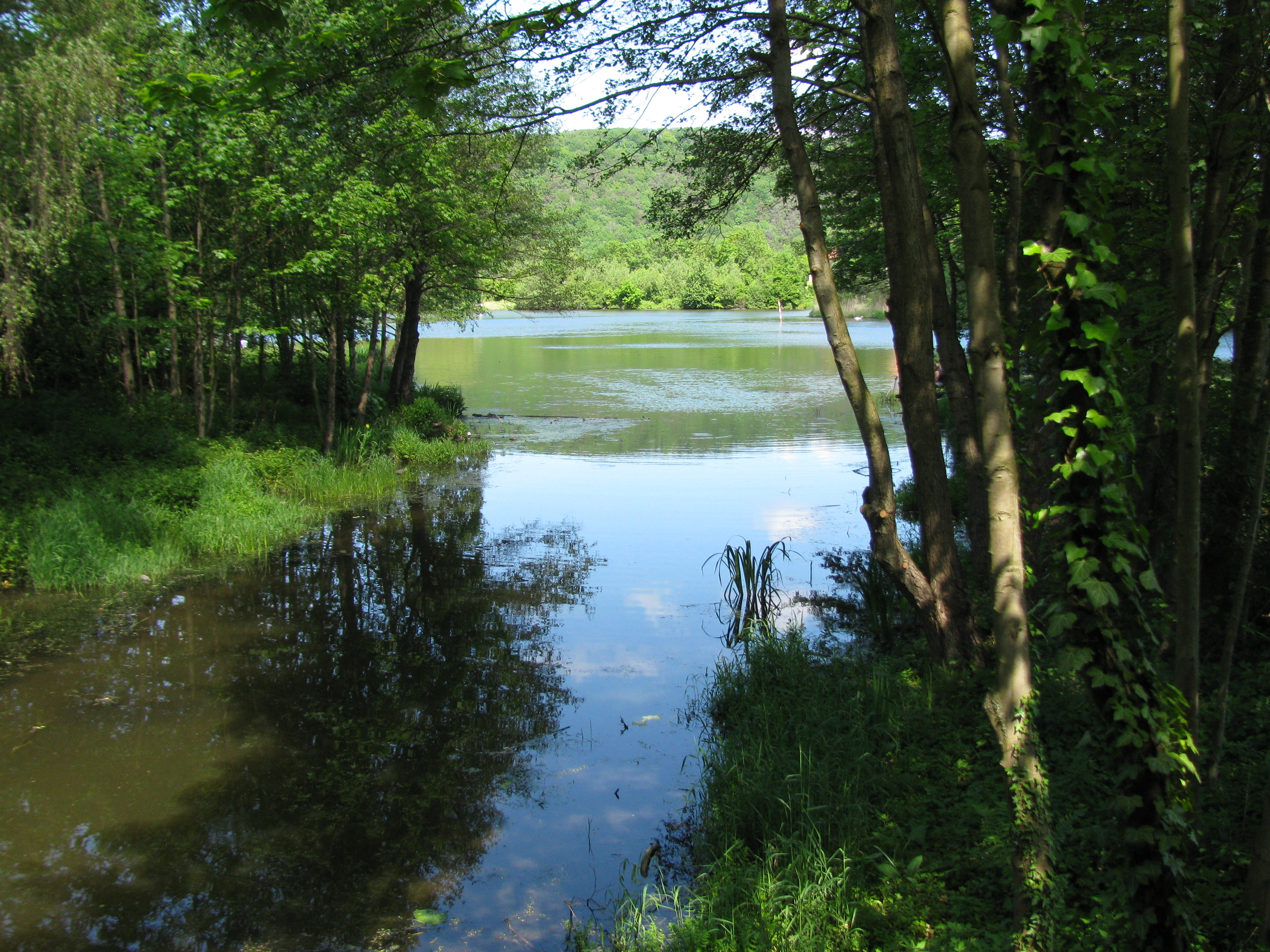
- Mouth of the Espe into the Fulda

Location
- Country: Germany
- State: Hesse

Physical characteristics
- Mouth
  - location: Fulda
  - coordinates: 51.3650°N 9.5299°E

Basin features
- Progression: Fulda→ Weser→ North Sea

Espe is a small river of Hesse, Germany. It flows into the Fulda northeast of Kassel.

== See also ==
- List of rivers of Hesse
