= Rombach (Liederbach) =

River in Germany

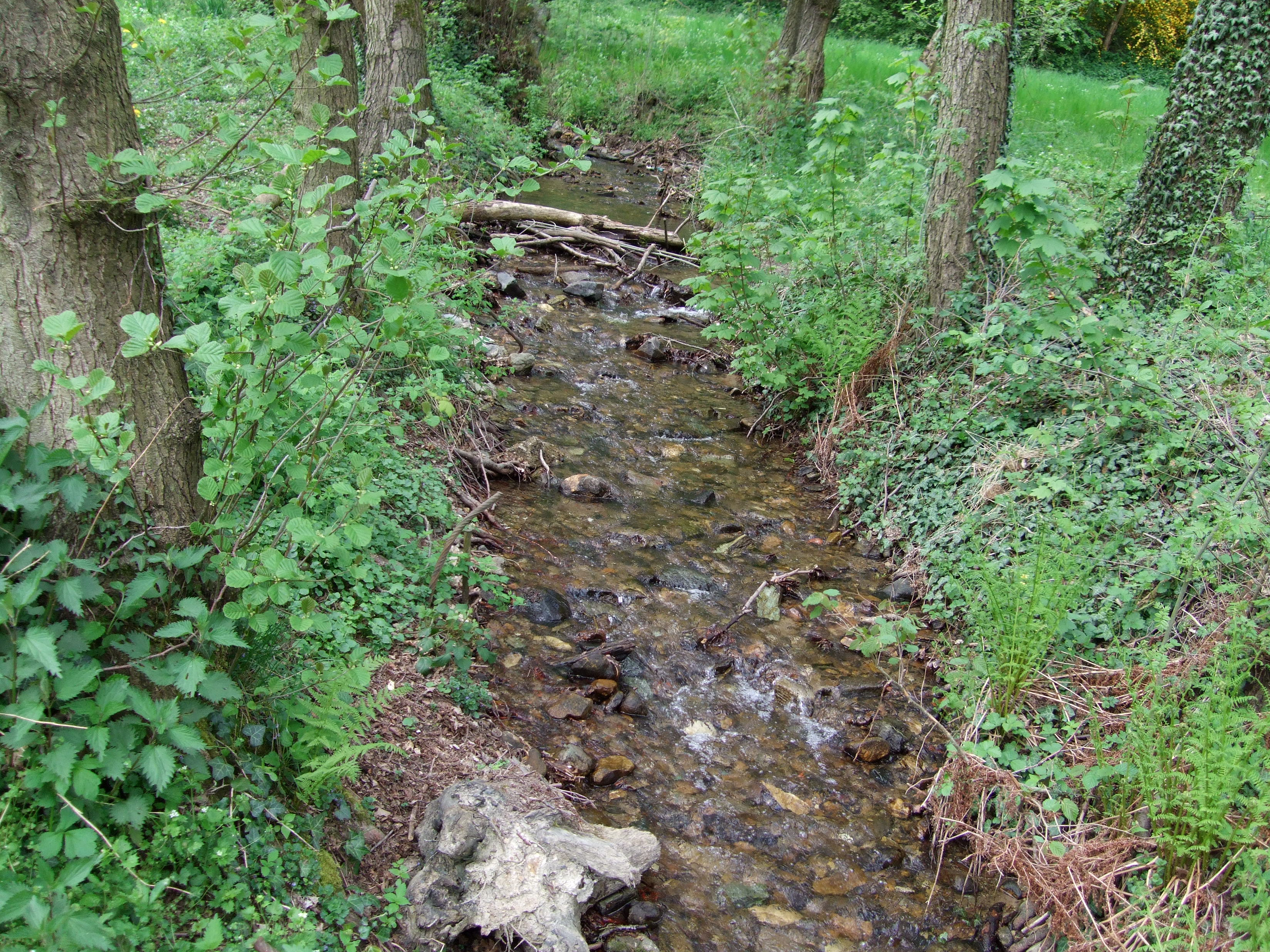

Location
- Country: Germany
- States: Hesse

Physical characteristics
- Mouth
  - location: Liederbach
  - coordinates: 50.1824°N 8.4547°E

Basin features
- Progression: Liederbach→ Main→ Rhine→ North Sea

Rombach is a small river of Hesse, Germany. It flows into the Liederbach in Königstein im Taunus.

== See also ==
- List of rivers of Hesse
