= Ruhrbach =

River in Germany

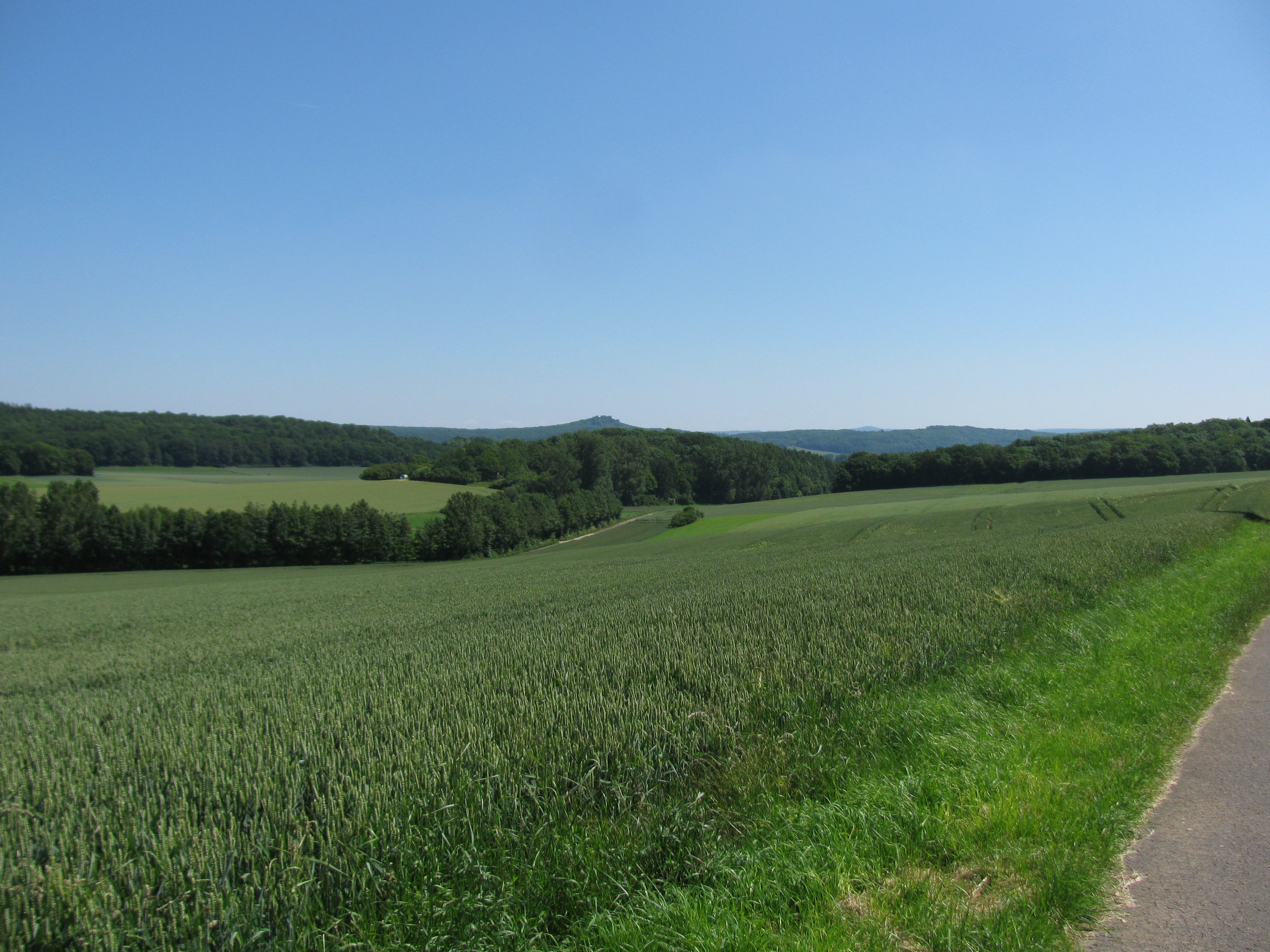
- The valley of the Ruhrbach between Niederlistingen (a district of Breuna) and Niedermeiser (a district of Liebenau)

Location
- Country: Germany
- States: Hesse

Physical characteristics
- Source
  - location: Oberlistingen, a district of Breuna
  - coordinates: 51°26′45″N 9°14′06″E
- Mouth
  - location: Warme
  - coordinates: 51°27′41″N 9°18′41″E

Basin features
- Progression: Warme→ Diemel→ Weser→ North Sea

Ruhrbach is a river of Hesse, Germany. It flows into the Warme in Niedermeiser.

== See also ==
- List of rivers of Hesse
