= Haselbach (Fulda) =

River in Hesse, Germany

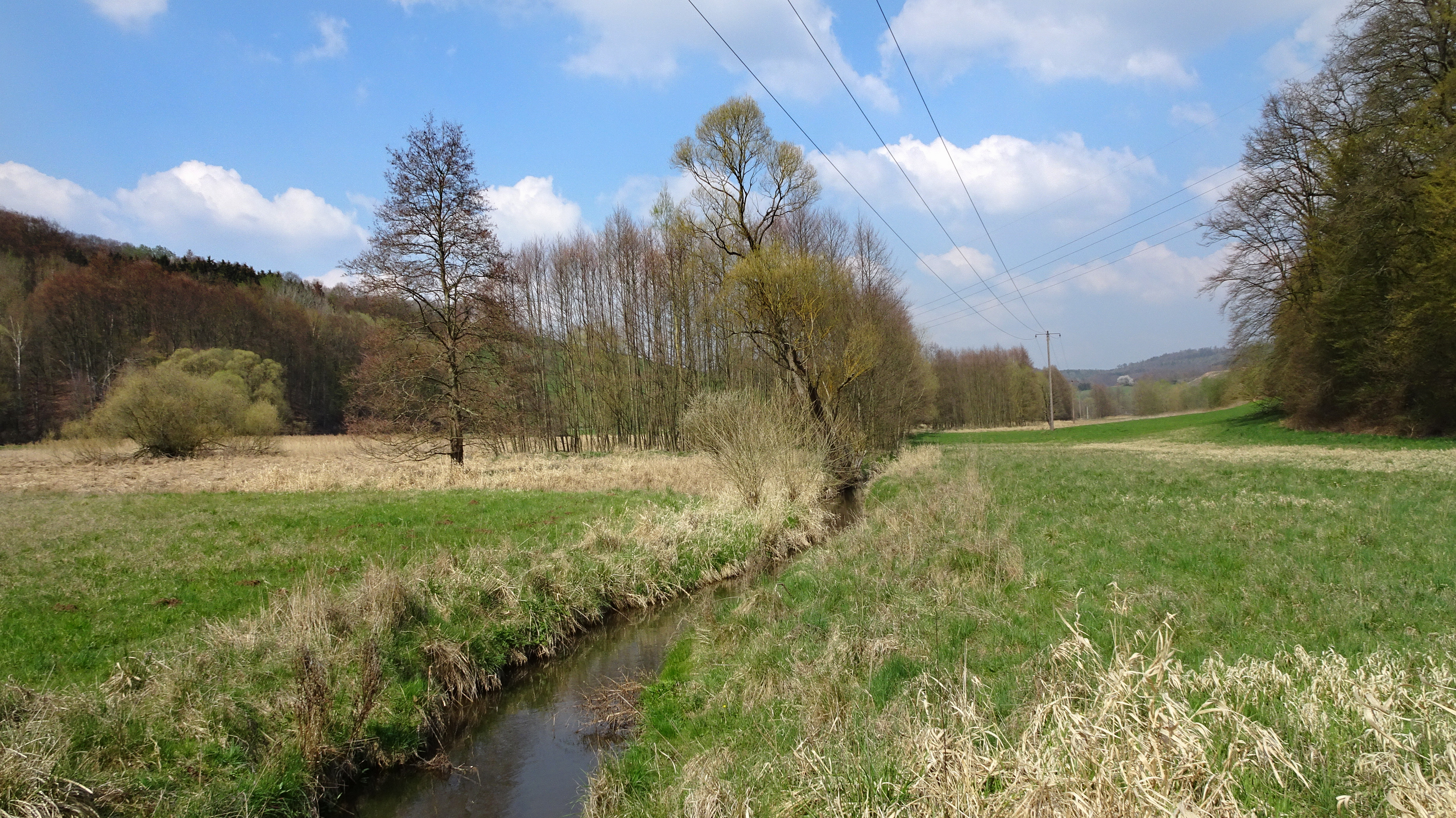

Location
- Country: Germany
- State: Hesse

Physical characteristics
- Mouth
  - location: Fulda
  - coordinates: 50.9892°N 9.7592°E
- Length: 11.9 km (7.4 mi)

Basin features
- Progression: Fulda→ Weser→ North Sea

Haselbach (German pronunciation: [ˈhaːzl̩bax]) is a river of Hesse, Germany. It is a right tributary of the Fulda near Rotenburg an der Fulda.

== See also ==
- List of rivers of Hesse
