= Bleichenbach (Nidder) =

River in Germany

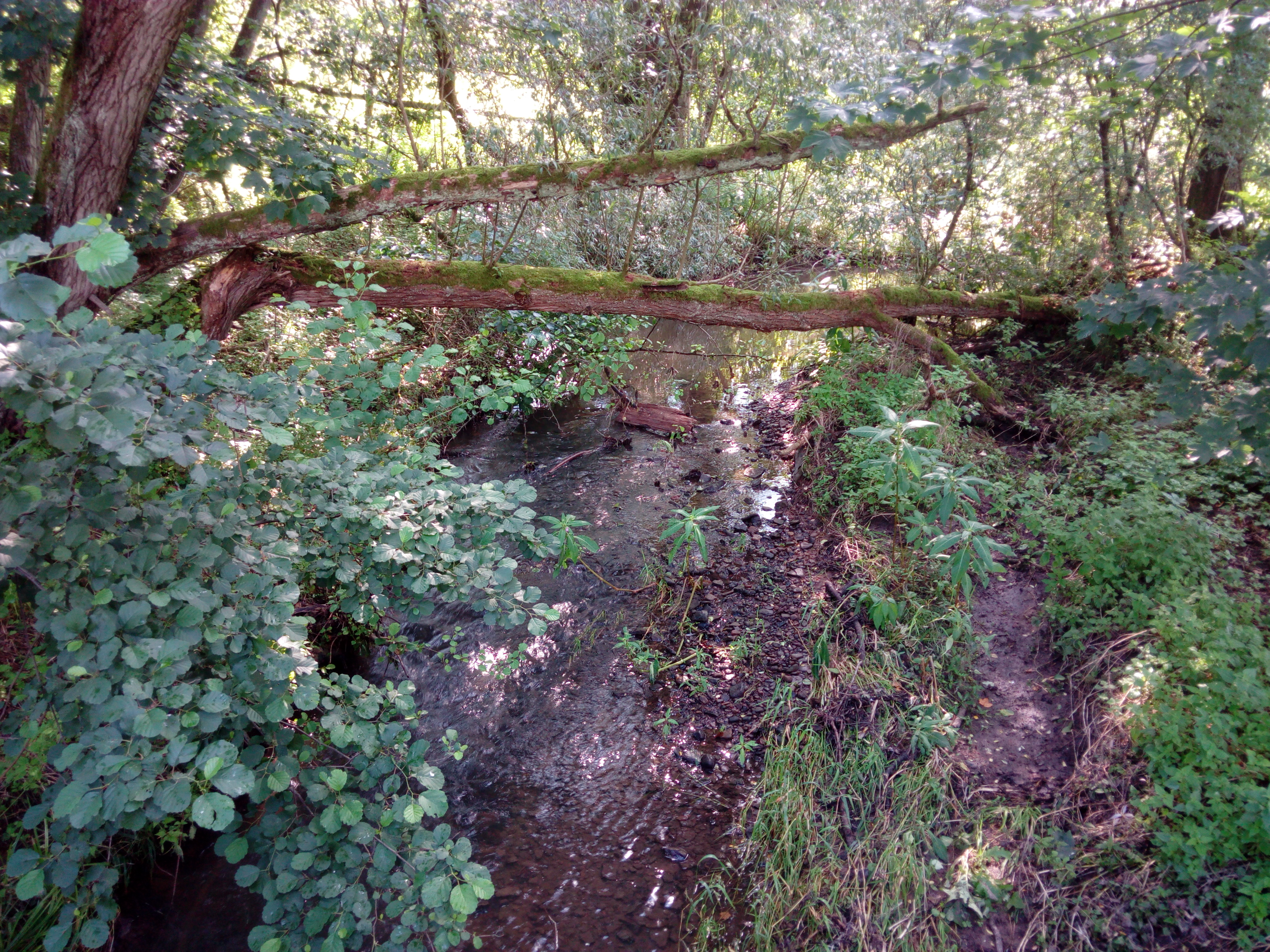
- The Bleichenbach between the districts Ortenberg and Bleichenbach of Ortenberg

Location
- Country: Germany
- State: Hesse

Physical characteristics
- Mouth
  - location: Nidder
  - coordinates: 50°19′16″N 8°59′46″E
- Length: 22.2 km (13.8 mi)

Basin features
- Progression: Nidder→ Nidda→ Main→ Rhine→ North Sea
- Tributaries
  - right: Wolfshainer Bach

The Bleichenbach is a river of Hesse, Germany and a left tributary of the Nidder. It flows into the Nidder in Glauberg.

== See also ==
- List of rivers of Hesse
