= List of rivers of Hesse =

This is a list of rivers of Hesse, Germany:

== A ==
- Aar, tributary of the Dill
- Aar, tributary of the Lahn
- Aar, tributary of the Twiste
- Aarbach
- Affhöllerbach
- Ahlersbach, tributary of the Kinzig in Schlüchtern-Herolz
- Ahlersbach, tributary of the Kinzig in Schlüchtern-Niederzell
- Ahne
- Aitzenbach
- Albach
- Allna
- Altefeld
- Ansbach
- Antrift
- Arnsbach
- Äschersbach
- Aselbach
- Asphe
- Aubach, tributary of the Aar
- Aubach, tributary of the Dill
- Auer
- Auerbach
- Augraben
- Aula

== B ==
- Bach an dem Margrund
- Bach an dem Schreinersgrund
- Bach an dem Seegrund
- Bach an der Frohndelle
- Bach an der Kniewiese
- Bach von dem Kohl
- Bach von dem Vierstöck
- Bach von den Rehwiesen
- Bach von der Dickhecke
- Bauna
- Bebra
- Beerbach, tributary of the Mergbach
- Beerbach, tributary of the Modau
- Beise
- Bentreff
- Benzenbach
- Berfa
- Bettenbach
- Bieber, tributary of the Haune
- Bieber, tributary of the Kinzig
- Bieber, tributary of the Lahn
- Bieber, tributary of the Rodau
- Bierbach
- Birkigsbach
- Bizzenbach
- Bleichenbach
- Boxbach
- Bracht
- Braubach
- Brechelser Floß
- Brensbach
- Brombach

== C ==
- Calenberger Bach
- Crumbach

== D ==
- Darmbach
- Dase
- Dautphe
- Detzelbach
- Deutergraben
- Diemel
- Dießenbach
- Diete
- Dietzhölze
- Dill
- Dilsbach
- Dittenbach
- Döllbach
- Dombach
- Dornbach
- Dorndorfer Bach
- Drusel
- Dünsbergbach
- Dusebach

== E ==
- Eberbach
- Eckelsbach
- Edelbach
- Eder
- Efze
- Eggel
- Eichbach
- Eichelbach, tributary of the Nidda
- Eichelbach, tributary of the Weil
- Eifa
- Eisenbach
- Eitra
- Elbbach
- Elbe
- Elmbach
- Elnhauser Wasser
- Elsoff
- Ems
- Emsbach
- Engelbach
- Erbesbach
- Erdbach
- Erlenbach, tributary of the Hillersbach
- Erlenbach, tributary of the Nidda
- Erlenbach, tributary of the Nidder
- Ernstbach
- Erpe
- Erzbach
- Eschbach, tributary of the Nidda
- Eschbach, tributary of the Usa
- Espe
- Esse
- Essebach

== F ==
- Fahrenbach
- Fallbach
- Fauerbach
- Felda
- Finkenbach
- Fischbach
- Fliede
- Flörsbach
- Forbach
- Formbach
- Frieda
- Frohnbach
- Fulda

== G ==
- Gansbach, tributary of the Perf
- Gänsbach, headstreams of the Merkenfritzerbach
- Geilebach
- Geisbach
- Gelster
- Geringsgraben
- Gers
- Gersprenz
- Gierbach
- Giesel
- Gilgbach
- Gilsa
- Gimbach
- Glisborn
- Goldbach, tributary of the Eder
- Goldbach, tributary of the Ems
- Gräbenackers Bach
- Graswiesenbach
- Grenff
- Grennelbach
- Grenzebach
- Gresel
- Grom-Bach
- Gronau
- Gründau
- Grundbach
- Grundelbach
- Grunnelbach
- Gundbach
- Güttersbach

== H ==
- Hainbach, tributary of the Main
- Hainbach, tributary of the Usa
- Hältersbach
- Hardwasser
- Hasel, tributary of the Haune
- Hasel, tributary of the Orb
- Haselbach
- Haune
- Häuserbach
- Heegbrückerbach
- Heller
- Hellgraben
- Herfabach
- Hillersbach
- Hirschbach
- Hirtenbach
- Hohensteinerbach
- Hohlbach
- Höllerbach
- Hollerbach
- Hollerbornbach
- Hollergraben
- Holzape
- Holzbach, tributary of the Diemel
- Holzbach, tributary of the Elbbach
- Holzbach, tributary of the Schweinfe
- Holzbach, tributary of the Usa
- Holzgraben
- Holzkape
- Hoppecke
- Horloff
- Hosbach

== I ==
- Ibra
- Ilsbach
- Irrbach
- Itter, tributary of the Diemel
- Itter, tributary of the Eder
- Itter, tributary of the Neckar

== J ==
- Josbach
- Jossa, tributary of the Fulda
- Jossa, tributary of the Lüder
- Jossa, tributary of the Sinn
- Jungfernbach, tributary of the Ahne
- Jungfernbach, tributary of the Esse

== K ==
- Kahl
- Kainsbach
- Kalbach
- Kälberbach
- Kaltes Wasser
- Käsbach
- Kehrenbach
- Kelster
- Kemmete
- Kerkerbach
- Kieselbach
- Kilsbach
- Kinzig, tributary of the Main
- Kinzig, tributary of the Mümling
- Kirchbach
- Kittelbach
- Kleebach
- Klein
- Kleppe
- Klingbach
- Klingebach
- Kohlbach
- Krebsbach, tributary of the Fallbach
- Krebsbach, tributary of the Nidder
- Küh-Bach
- Kuhbach
- Kumpgraben
- Kupferbach

== L ==
- Lache
- Lahn
- Laisbach
- Langenbach
- Langendernbach
- Lasterbach
- Laubach
- Laubersbach
- Laubusbach
- Lauchbach
- Laudenauer Bach
- Laudenbach
- Läunsbach
- Lauter
- Lauter, tributary of the Schlitz
- Lauter, tributary of the Wetter
- Laxbach
- Leimbach
- Lembach
- Lemp
- Lempe
- Liederbach
- Limeckebach
- Linspherbach
- Lohbach
- Lohr
- Lohrbach
- Losse
- Lüder
- Luderbach
- Lumda
- Lütter

== M ==
- Main
- Männerwasser
- Marbach
- Marbeck
- Matzbach
- Matzoff
- Meiereibach
- Mergbach
- Merkenfritzerbach
- Merrebach
- Michelbach, tributary of the Gersprenz
- Michelbach, tributary of the Nidda
- Michelbach, tributary of the Usa
- Modau
- Molsberger Bach
- Monzenbach
- Mühlbach, tributary of the Elbbach
- Mühlbach, tributary of the Merkenfritzerbach
- Mühlbach, tributary of the Schwarzbach
- Mühlenwasser
- Mülmisch
- Mümling
- Mutterbach

== N ==
- Näßlichbach
- Nebelbeeke
- Neckar
- Neerdar
- Nemphe
- Netze
- Nidda
- Nidder
- Nieste
- Norde
- Nuhne
- Nüst

== O ==
- Ocherbach
- Oderbach
- Ohe
- Ohebach, tributary of the Efze
- Ohebach, tributary of the Kehrenbach
- Ohm
- Olfe
- Olmes
- Orb
- Orke
- Orpe
- Osterbach, tributary of the Eder
- Osterbach, tributary of the Fulda
- Osterbach, headwater of the Gersprenz

== P ==
- Palmbach
- Perf
- Pfieffe
- Pflaumbach (upper course of the Welzbach)
- Pilgerbach

== R ==
- Ramholzer Wasser
- Reichenbach
- Reiherbach
- Rhine
- Rhena
- Rhene
- Rhünda
- Riedbach
- Rinnebach
- Rodau
- Röderbach
- Rohrbach, tributary of the Fulda
- Rohrbach, tributary of the Osterbach
- Röllbach
- Rombach
- Rosbach
- Rotes Wasser
- Ruhrbach

== S ==
- Salz
- Salzbach, tributary of the Elbbach
- Salzbach, tributary of the Nidda
- Salzbach, tributary of the Seemenbach
- Salzbach, tributary of the Rhine at Wiesbaden
- Salzböde
- Sauerbornsbach
- Saurode
- Schaubach
- Schelde
- Schellenbach
- Schemmerbach
- Schifflache
- Schleichenbach
- Schleiersbach
- Schlichenbach
- Schlitz
- Schlüsselgrund
- Schmale Sinn
- Schmalnau
- Schmiehbach
- Schnepfenbach
- Schorbach
- Schwalbach
- Schwalm
- Schwarzbach, tributary of the Elmbach
- Schwarzbach, tributary of the Main
- Schwarzbach of the Hessian Ried, tributary of the Rhine
- Schweinfe
- Schwingbach
- Schwülme
- Seebach
- Seemenbach
- Seenbach
- Seifenbach
- Selzenbach
- Seulbach
- Siegbach
- Sinn
- Solmsbach
- Solz, tributary of the Fulda near Bebra, downstream of the other Solz
- Solz, tributary of the Fulda near Bad Hersfeld, upstream of the other Solz
- Sontra
- Soode
- Spießbach, tributary of the Nidder
- Spießbach, tributary of the Sauer
- Spolebach
- Steina
- Steinach
- Steinbach, tributary of the Gersprenz
- Steinbach, tributary of the Nidda
- Steinebach
- Stierbach
- Stockheimer Bach
- Straßbach
- Strupbach
- Suhl
- Sulzbach

== T ==
- Taft
- Thalheimer Bach
- Thiele
- Tiefenbach
- Treisbach, tributary of the Gilsa
- Treisbach, tributary of the Wetschaft
- Twiste

== U ==
- Ulfa
- Ulfe, tributary of the Fulda
- Ulfe, tributary of the Sontra
- Ulfenbach
- Ulmbach, tributary of the Kinzig
- Ulmbach, tributary of the Lahn
- Ulster
- Urff
- Urselbach
- Usa

== V ==
- Vers
- Vierbach
- Villbach
- Vockebach
- Vogelthal-Bach

== W ==
- Wahlebach
- Waldbach
- Walgerbach
- Walluf
- Wande
- Warme
- Watter
- Watzenbach
- Wehrbach
- Wehre
- Weid
- Weihe
- Weil
- Weilbach
- Weissbach
- Welzbach (upper course Pflaumbach)
- Wembach
- Wenkbach
- Werbe
- Werra
- Weschnitz
- Wesebach
- Weser
- Wetschaft
- Wetter
- Wickerbach
- Wiehoff
- Wiera
- Wiesbach, tributary of the Usa
- Wiesbach, tributary of the Weil
- Wiesbüttgraben
- Wieseck
- Wilde
- Wilde Aa
- Windbach
- Wisper
- Wohra
- Wolfsbach
- Wolfshainer Bach
- Wörsbach
- Wünschbach

== Z ==
- Zahlbach
- Zwester Ohm
