= Augraben (Liederbach) =

River in Germany

- Location of mouth in Hesse

Location
- Country: Germany
- State: Hesse

Physical characteristics
- Mouth
  - location: Liederbach
  - coordinates: 50.1174°N 8.5126°E

Basin features
- Progression: Liederbach→ Main→ Rhine→ North Sea

The Augraben is a small river of Hesse, Germany. It is a nearly 1.5 km long, left and northern tributary of the Liederbach in Oberliederbach. The 1.4-km long course of the Augraben ends about 16 meters below its source, giving it an average bed gradient of about 11 ‰.

== See also ==
- List of rivers of Hesse
