= Schemmerbach =

River in Hesse, Germany

Location
- Country: Germany
- State: Hesse

Physical characteristics
- Mouth
  - location: Wehre
  - coordinates: 51.1449°N 9.8810°E
- Length: 11.0 km (6.8 mi)

Basin features
- Progression: Wehre→ Werra→ Weser→ North Sea

Schemmerbach is a river in Hesse, Germany. It flows into the Wehre in Waldkappel.

== See also ==
- List of rivers of Hesse
