= Wickerbach =

River in Germany

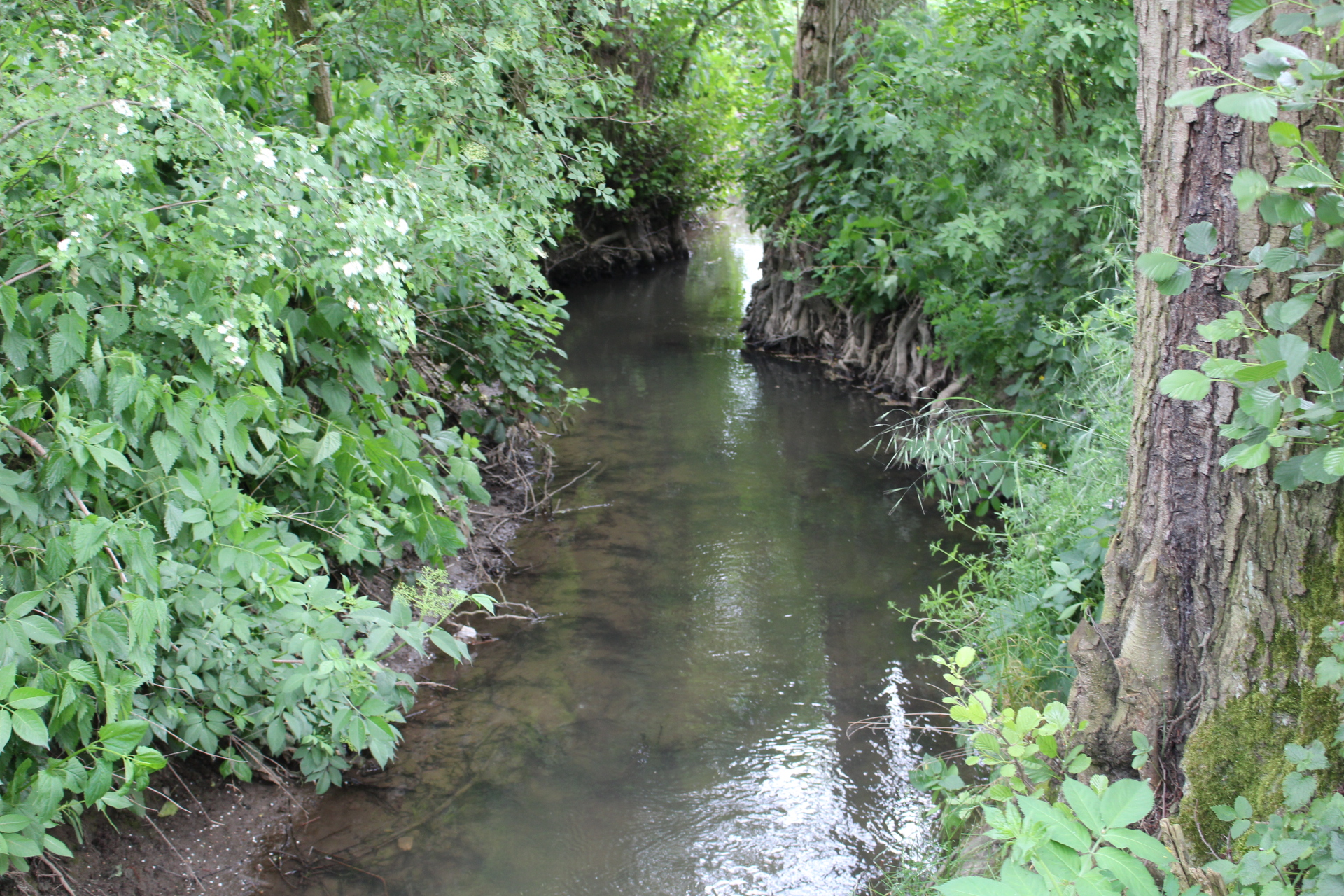

Location
- Country: Germany
- State: Hesse

Physical characteristics
- Mouth
  - location: Main
  - coordinates: 49.9973°N 8.4020°E
- Length: 24.0 km (14.9 mi)

Basin features
- Progression: Main→ Rhine→ North Sea

Wickerbach is a river of Hesse, Germany. It flows from the eastern suburbs of Wiesbaden and into the Main at Flörsheim.

== See also ==
- List of rivers of Hesse
