= Hellgraben =

River in Germany

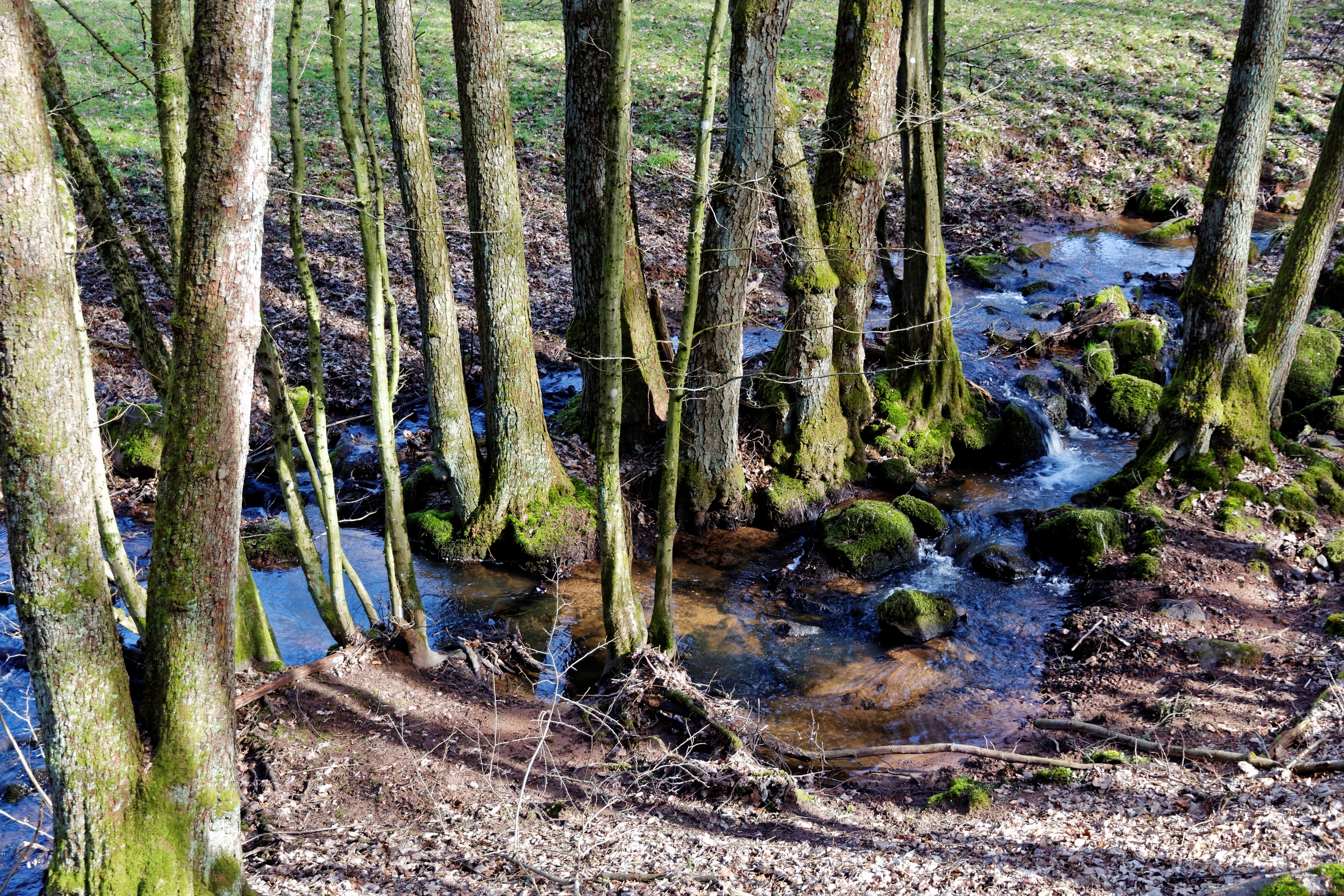

Location
- Country: Germany
- States: Hesse

Physical characteristics
- Mouth
  - location: Kinzig
  - coordinates: 50.3118°N 9.4397°E

Basin features
- Progression: Kinzig→ Main→ Rhine→ North Sea

Hellgraben is a small river in Hesse, Germany. It flows into the Kinzig near Steinau an der Straße.

== See also ==
- List of rivers of Hesse
