= Drusel =

River in Germany

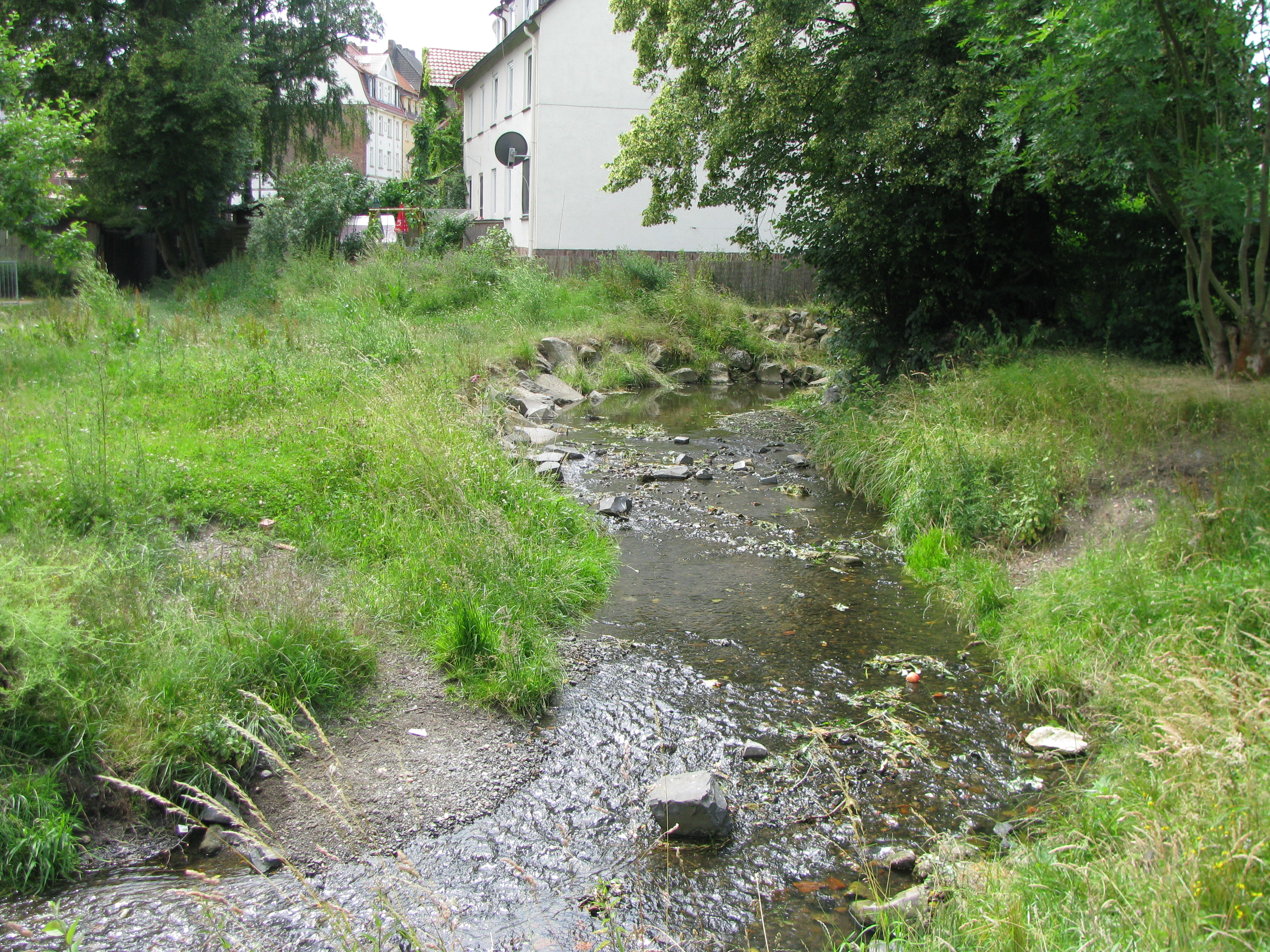
- The Drusel in the Kassel district Bad Wilhelmshöhe

Location
- Country: Germany
- State: Hesse

Physical characteristics
- Mouth
  - location: Fulda
  - coordinates: 51.3131°N 9.5037°E
- Length: 11.7 km (7.3 mi)

Basin features
- Progression: Fulda→ Weser→ North Sea

The Drusel is a river of Hesse, Germany. It flows into the Fulda in Kassel.

== See also ==
- List of rivers of Hesse
