= Walluf (Rhine) =

River in Germany

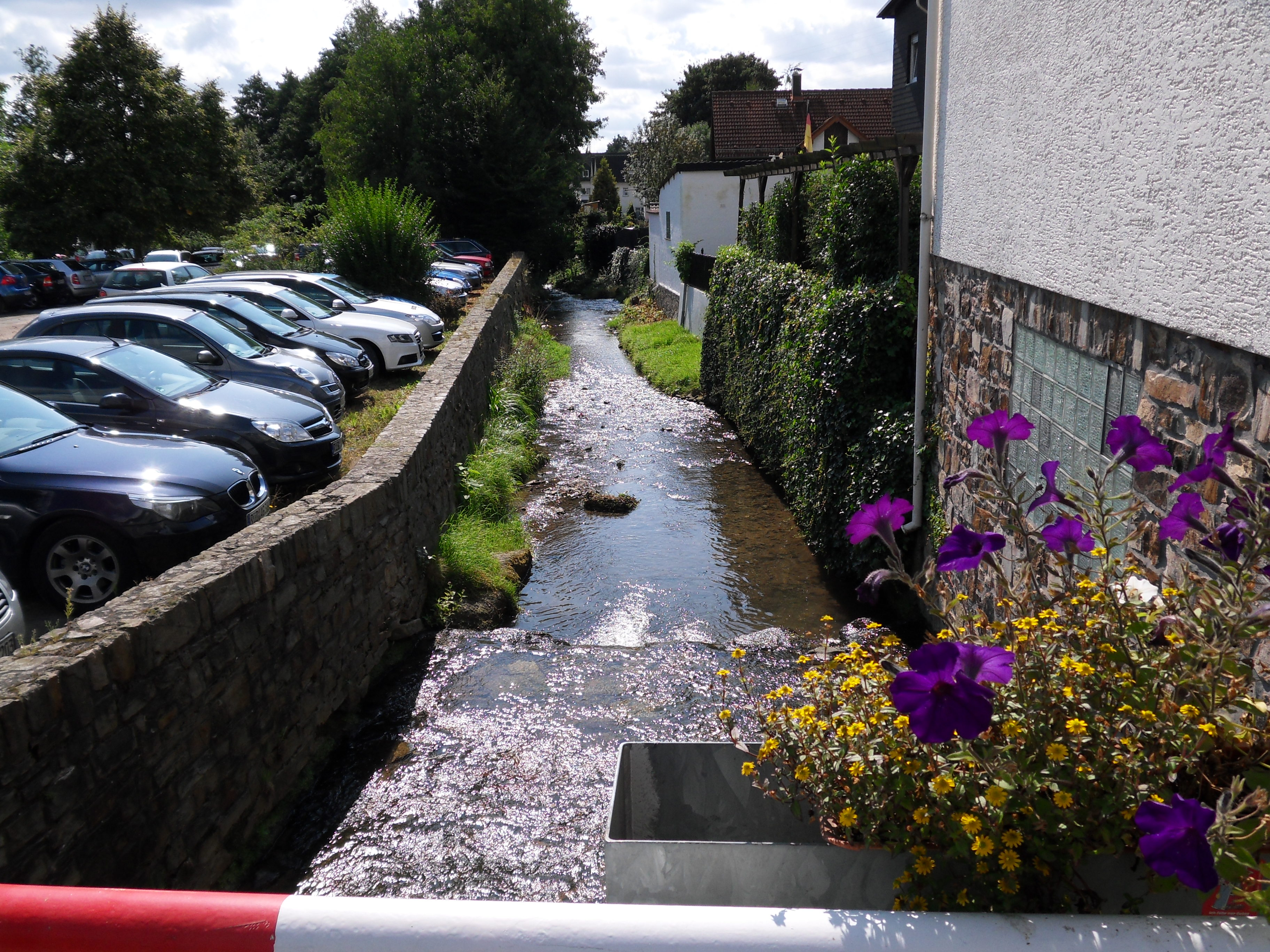

Location
- Country: Germany
- State: Hesse

Physical characteristics
- Mouth
  - location: Rhine
  - coordinates: 50.0346°N 8.1630°E
- Length: 13.8 km (8.6 mi)

Basin features
- Progression: Rhine→ North Sea

Walluf is a river of Hesse, Germany. It flows into the Rhine in the village Walluf.

== See also ==
- List of rivers of Hesse
