= Luderbach =

River in Germany

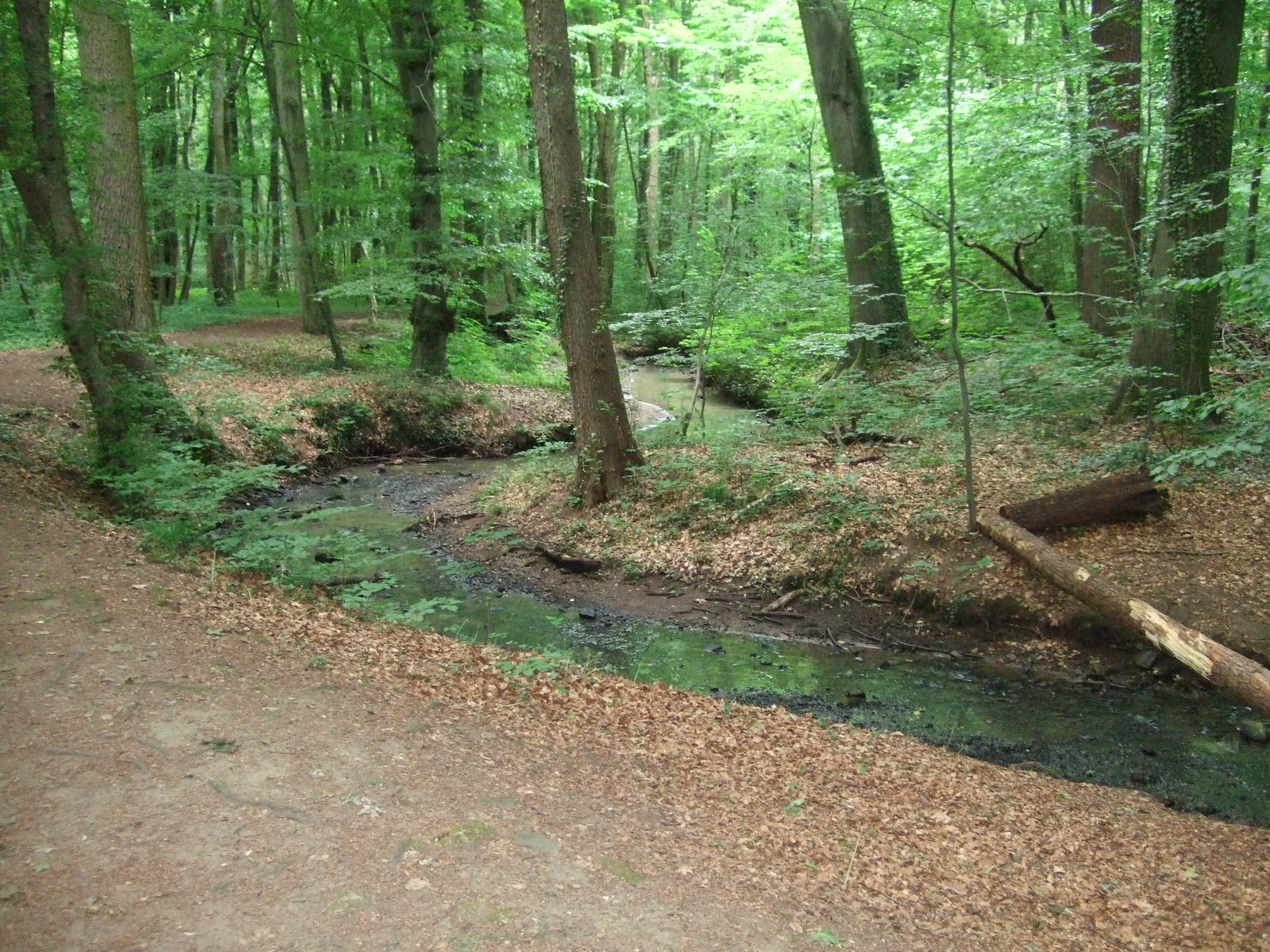

Location
- Country: Germany
- State: Hesse

Physical characteristics
- Mouth
  - location: Main
  - coordinates: 50.0950°N 8.6541°E
- Length: 13.7 km (8.5 mi)

Basin features
- Progression: Main→ Rhine→ North Sea

Luderbach (also: Königsbach) is a river of Hesse, Germany. It flows into the Main in Frankfurt.

== See also ==
- List of rivers of Hesse
