= Bad Vilbel station =

Railway station in Hesse, Germany

Bad Vilbel
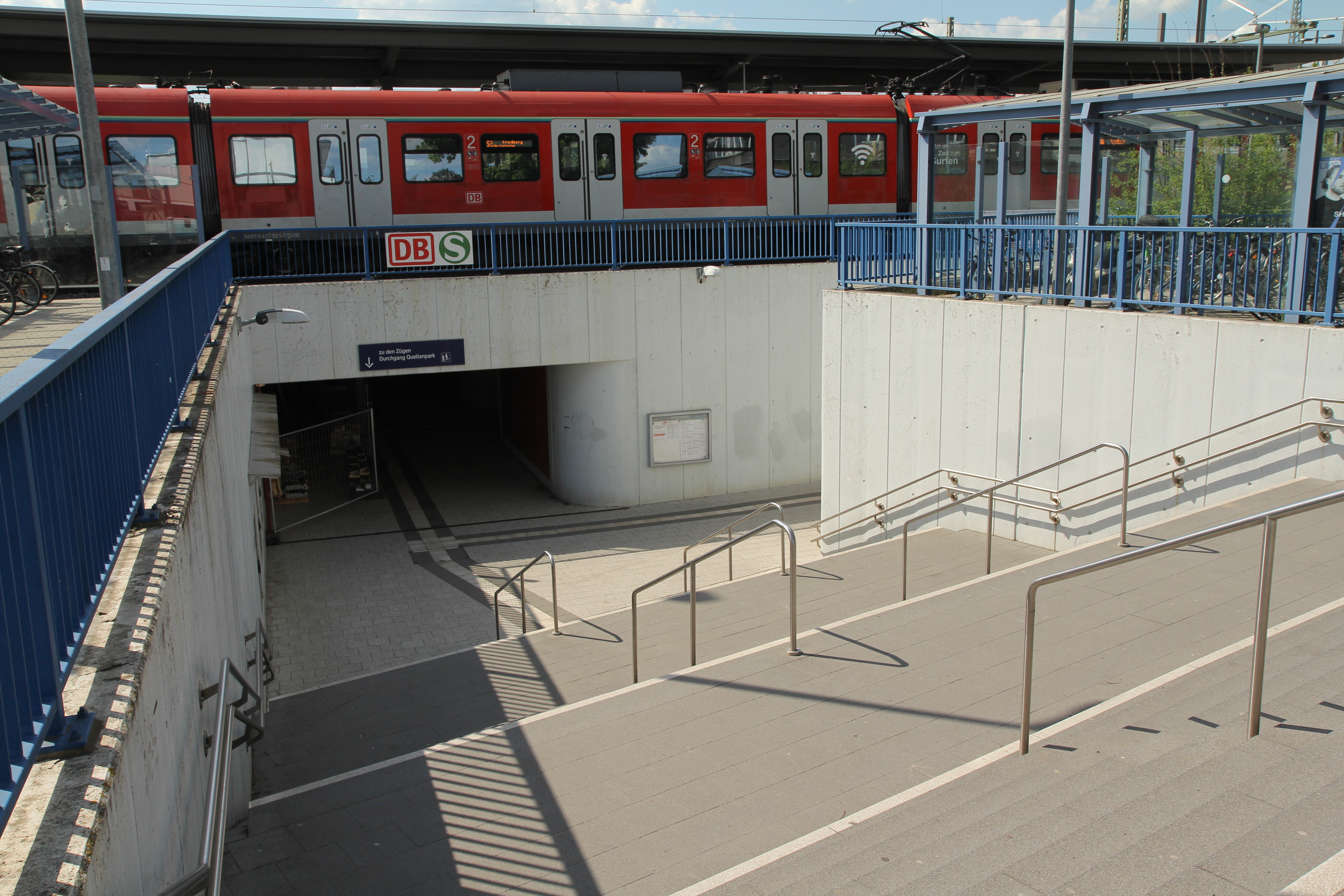

General information
- Location: Bahnhofsplatz 1 Bad Vilbel, Hesse; Germany
- Coordinates: 50°11′18″N 8°44′24″E
- Lines: Main–Weser Railway (183.6 km); Nidder Valley Railway (0.0 km)
- Platforms: 8

Construction
- Accessible: Yes

Other information
- Station code: 358
- DS100 code: RMF
- IBNR: 8000760
- Category: 3
- Fare zone: : 2601
- Website: www.bahnhof.de

History
- Opened: 10 May 1850; 176 years ago

Services
Preceding station	DB Regio Mitte	Following station
Frankfurt West towards Frankfurt (Main) Hbf	RB 34	Bad Vilbel-Gronau towards Glauburg-Stockheim
Friedberg towards Treysa	RB 41 selected trains only	Frankfurt West towards Frankfurt (Main) Hbf
Bad Vilbel-Dortelweil towards Treysa	RB 41	Terminus
Preceding station	Hessische Landesbahn	Following station
Friedberg towards Gießen or Marburg	RB 37	Frankfurt West towards Frankfurt (Main) Hbf
Preceding station	Rhine-Main S-Bahn	Following station
Terminus	S6 (Rhine-Main S-Bahn)	Bad Vilbel Süd towards Darmstadt Hbf
Location
- Location within Hesse

Bad Vilbel station is located at the 183.6 kilometre mark of the Main-Weser Railway in the town of Bad Vilbel in the German state of Hesse. The Nidder Valley Railway branches from Bad Vilbel via Nidderau to Glauburg-Stockheim. It is classified by Deutsche Bahn as a category 3 station.

The tariffs for local and regional trains stopping at this station are determined by the Rhein-Main-Verkehrsverbund (Rhine-Main Transport Association, RMV).

== History ==
Bad Vilbel station was opened with the opening of the Frankfurt–Friedberg section of the Main-Weser Railway station on 10 May 1850. The entire length of the Main-Weser Railway from Kassel to Frankfurt was opened to traffic on 15 May 1852.

The section of the Nidder Valley Railway between Vilbel Nord (now called Bad Vilbel) station and Heldenbergen-Windecken (now Nidderau) was opened on 1 June 1907. A new entrance building was built and put into operation for the opening of the new line. It is now protected as a cultural monument under the Hessian Monument Protection Act. Operations on the Nidder Valley Railway on weekends were re-established on 4 May 2008.

The Rhine-Main S-Bahn was opened on 28 May 1978. Since then, Bad Vilbel station has been served by S-Bahn line S6, which has operated since 1992 on the Friedberg–Bad Vilbel–Frankfurt Hbf (underground)–Frankfurt South route.

For many decades planning has been underway to add two separate tracks to the Main-Weser Railway between Frankfurt and Bad Vilbel for the S-Bahn. Planning permission for the project was granted in the Bad Vilbel area in 2010. This construction of two tracks between Frankfurt-West and Bad Vilbel exclusively for the S-Bahn was carried out between 2017 and 2024. This required moving the original tracks. The new tracks were opened for regular traffic on 19 February 2024.

== Platforms ==
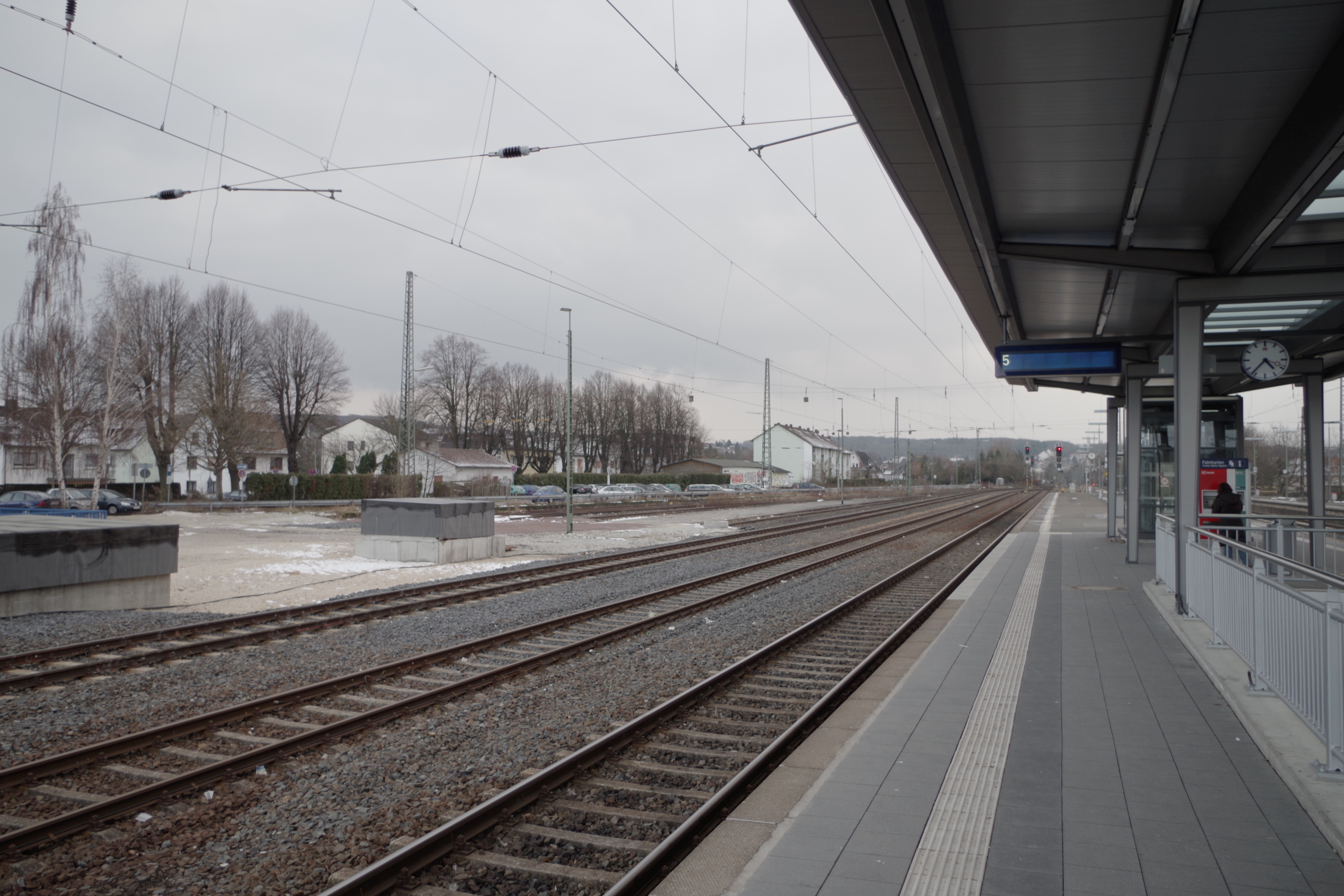
Platform tracks 5, 4 and 3, behind them the construction site for the 2 new tracks, seen from the second platform, facing southwest

Bad Vilbel station has an extensive system of tracks. Eight platform tracks (six through tracks and two stub tracks ) are available for passenger traffic. Reconstruction of the platforms began in 2012 to make them accessible for people with disabilities. There is also a track used for freight traffic. In addition, there are sidings 13, 14, 15, 16, and 121.

Grouped by platform:

=== Platform 1 ===
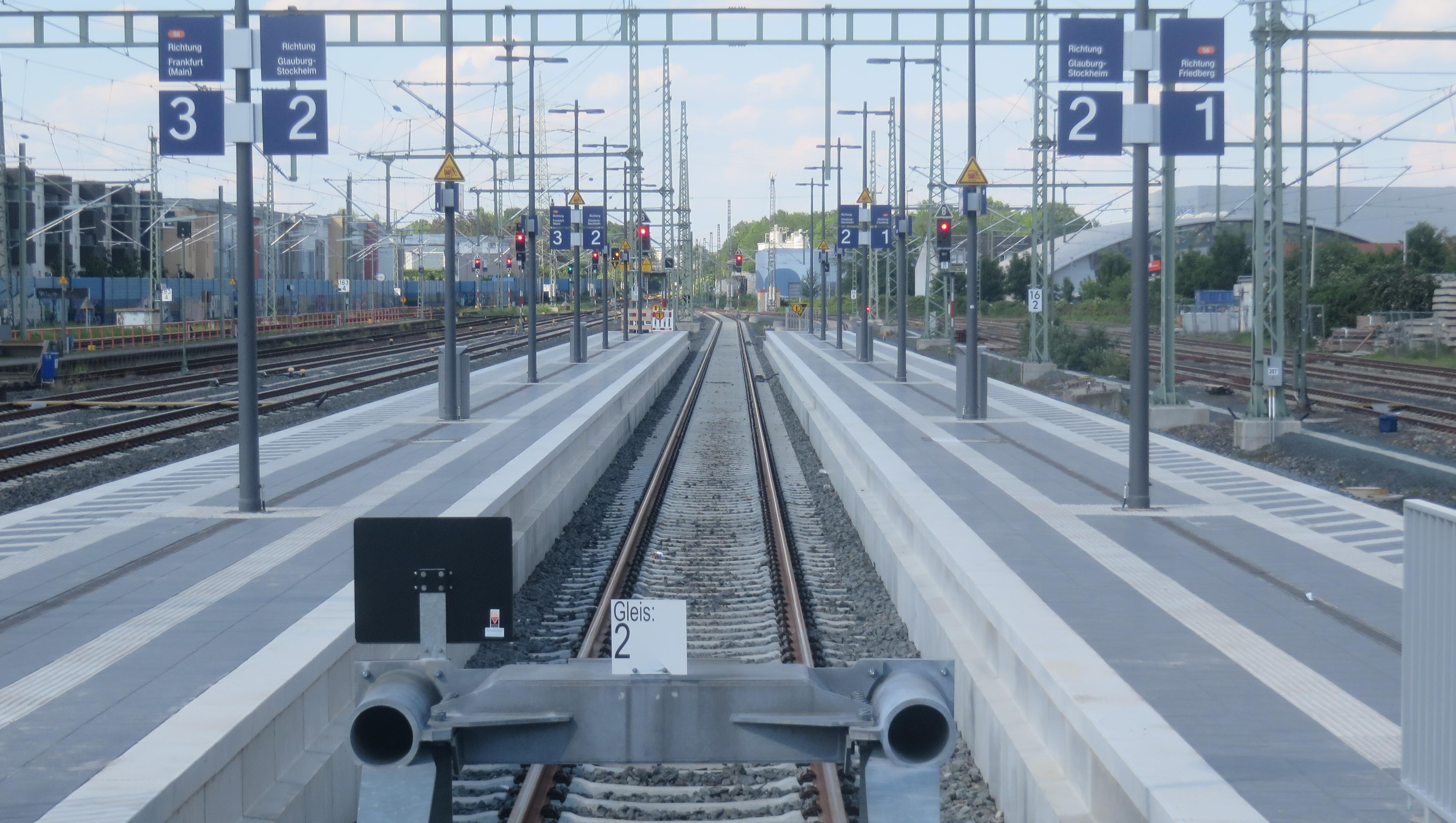
Platforms for S-Bahn (outer) and Nidder Valley Railway (inner)

The platform height is 96 cm.

- Track 1 is a through track and the main track of the S-Bahn towards Friedberg and shares the eastern island platform with track 3.
- Track 2 is a bay platform (ballasted to a height of 76 cm) that ends in the middle of the island platform of tracks 1/3. Some trains of the Nidder Valley Railway start and end here.
- Track 3 is a through track and the main track of the S-Bahn towards Frankfurt and shares the eastern island platform with track 1.
- Track 4 is a through track without a platform. It is used as a passing and overtaking track for freight traffic.

=== Second platform ===
The platform height is 76 cm.

- Track 5 is a through track and is located on the eastern island platform next to track 7. This is used for services on the Nidder Valley Railway.
- Track 6 is a bay platform that runs from the north and ends on the island platform between tracks 5 and 7. Some services on the Nidder Valley Railway start and end here.
- Track 7 is a through track and is the main platform for services on the Main-Weser Railway to Kassel.

=== Third platform ===
The platform height is 76 cm.

- Track 8 is the main platform for services on the Main-Weser Railway to Frankfurt and shares the western island platform with track 9.
- Track 9 is another through track. It is used as an alternative platform track and for services being overtaken.

The ticket office was closed in late 2003.

== Rail services ==
The journey time to Frankfurt Hauptbahnhof by S-Bahn is about 20 minutes. There are also Regionalbahn connections to Frankfurt during peak hours and Mittelhessen-Express (RE 41) services stop every two hours. The journey time to Frankfurt station for regional services is about 15 minutes.

Services on S-Bahn line S6 connect Bad Vilbel during the day at approximately 15-minute intervals to inner Frankfurt and Groß Karben. Every second S-Bahn service from Groß Karben continues to Friedberg station.

Since the modernisation of the Nidder Valley Railway, almost all trains on weekdays run to/from Frankfurt Hauptbahnhof. The remaining trains run as Regionalbahn services, beginning and ending in Bad Vilbel.

In the early evening hours, two trains of the Niddertal-Netz (Nidder Valley Network) run as a combined service of lines RB34 and RB48, starting from Frankfurt, uncoupling in Bad Vilbel. While the front part of the train runs to Glauburg-Stockheim, the rear part continues to Nidda. In the morning peak hour, two trains run separately from Nidda via Friedberg to Frankfurt.

Since 13 December 2009, the Mittelhessen-Express has stopped every two hours in Bad Vilbel. Its trains run from Frankfurt to Giessen with two sections coupled together. The sections are split in Giessen. Then one section runs as RE 41 to Treysa and the other section runs to Dillenburg as RB 40.

Since 11 December 2011, the Main-Sieg-Express (RE 99), designated as an RE-sprinter service, has stopped in Bad Vilbel during the morning peak.

Line	Route	Frequency
S6 (Rhine-Main S-Bahn)	Friedberg – Nieder Wöllstadt – Groß Karben – Bad Vilbel – Frankfurter Berg – Frankfurt West – Frankfurt Messe – Frankfurt Hbf – Frankfurt Süd – Langen – Darmstadt	Every 15 mins
RE 30	Frankfurt Hbf – Bad Vilbel – Friedberg – Bad Nauheim – Butzbach – Gießen (– Marburg)	Only in peak
RB 34	(Frankfurt Hbf –) Bad Vilbel – Niederdorfelden – Schöneck – Nidderau – Altenstadt – Stockheim	Every 60 mins (Every 30 mins in peak)
RB 37	Frankfurt Hbf – Bad Vilbel – Friedberg – Bad Nauheim – Butzbach – Gießen (– Marburg)	Every 60 mins
RB 40/ RB 41	Frankfurt Hbf – Bad Vilbel – Friedberg – Bad Nauheim – Butzbach – Gießen – Dillenburg/Marburg/Treysa	Some services
RE 99	Siegen>Haiger>Dillenburg>Herborn>Wetzlar>(Gießen)>Ostheim> Bad Vilbel > Frankfurt Hbf.	2 services

=== Bus ===
Bad Vilbel is connected by several bus routes to the surrounding cities of Frankfurt, Offenbach am Main, Bad Homburg (Ober-Erlenbach), Karben and Rosbach vor der Höhe. It is also served by five city bus routes.

== Photographs ==
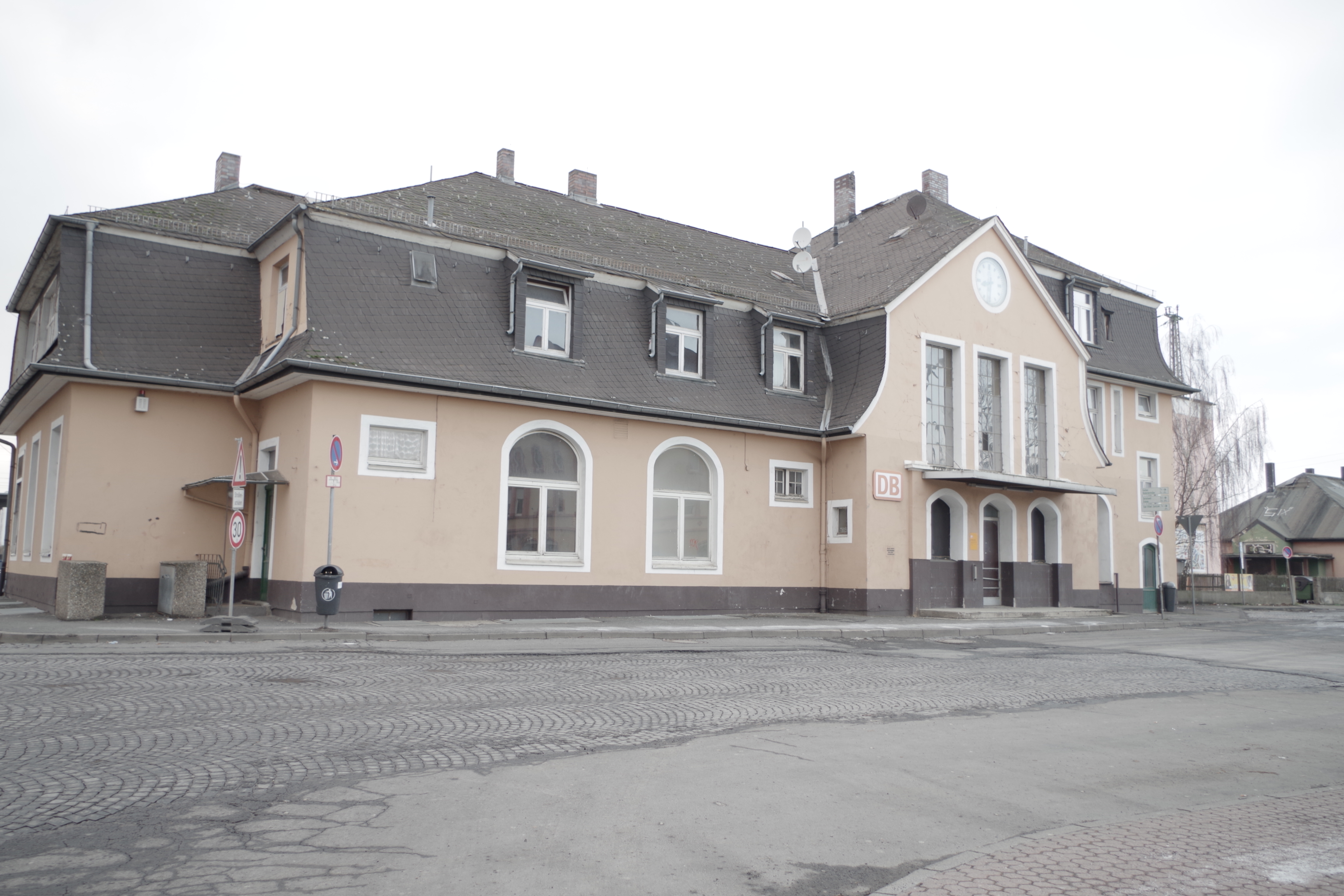
Former Entrance building from the street side

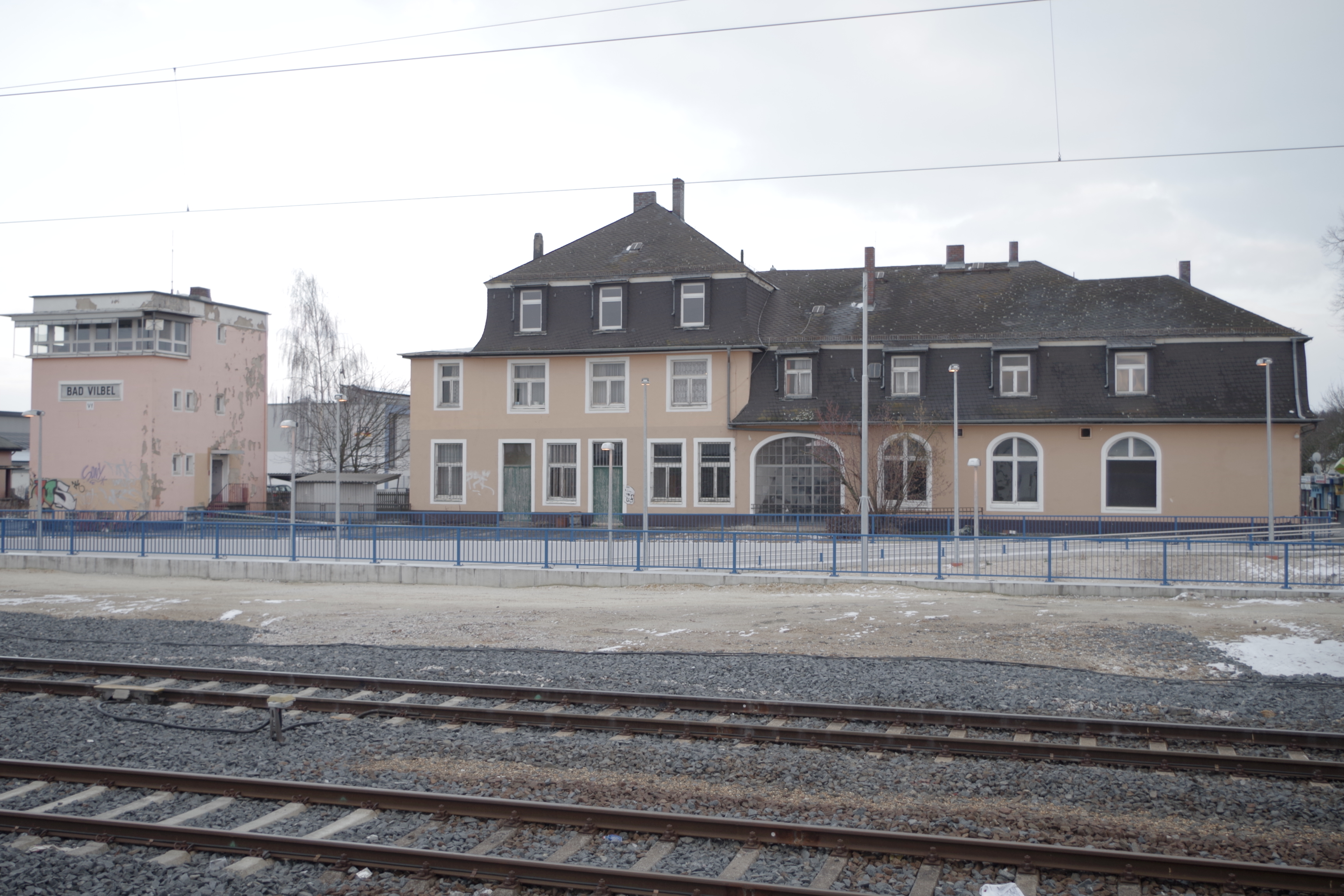
Former Entrance building from the rail side

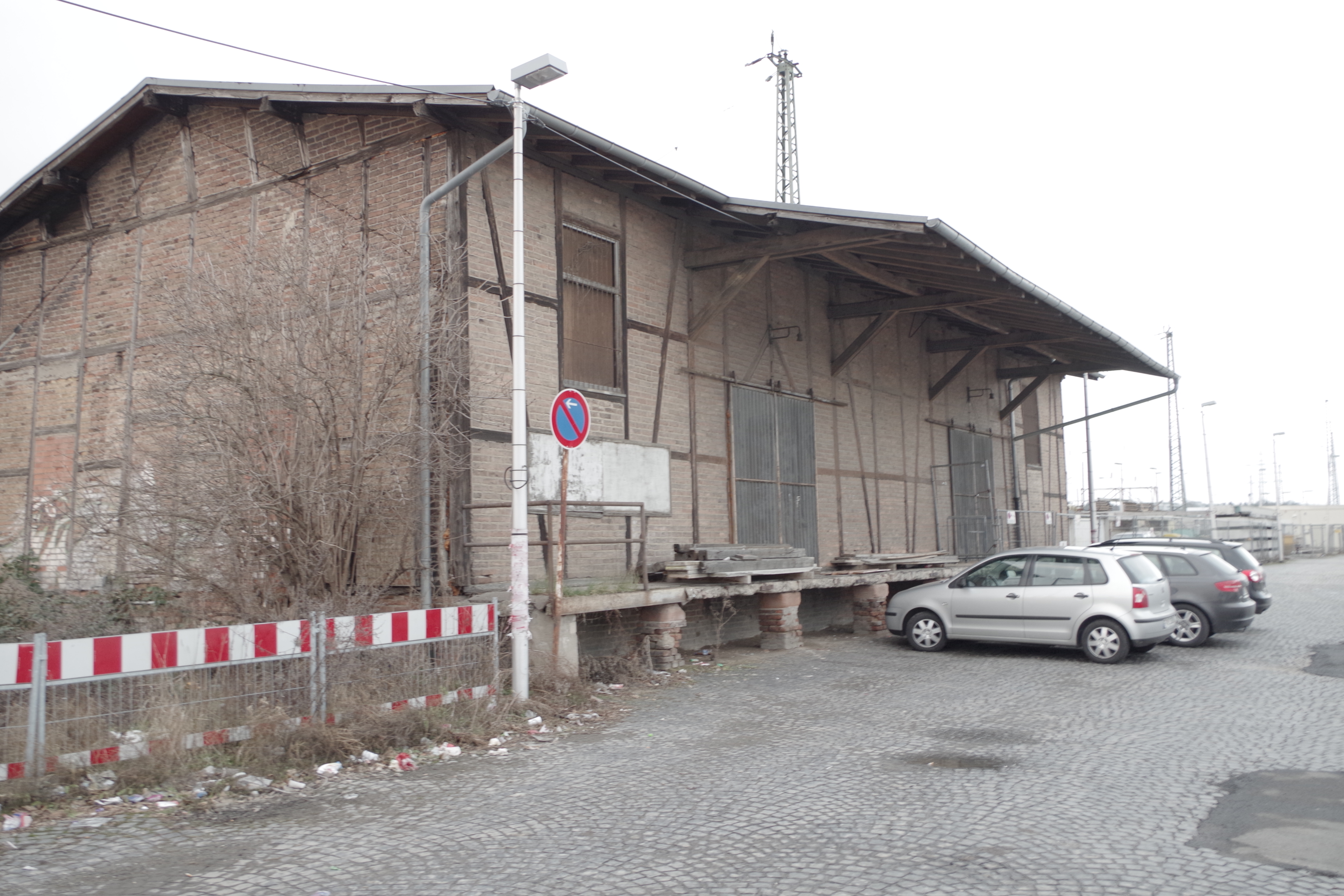
Former freight shed

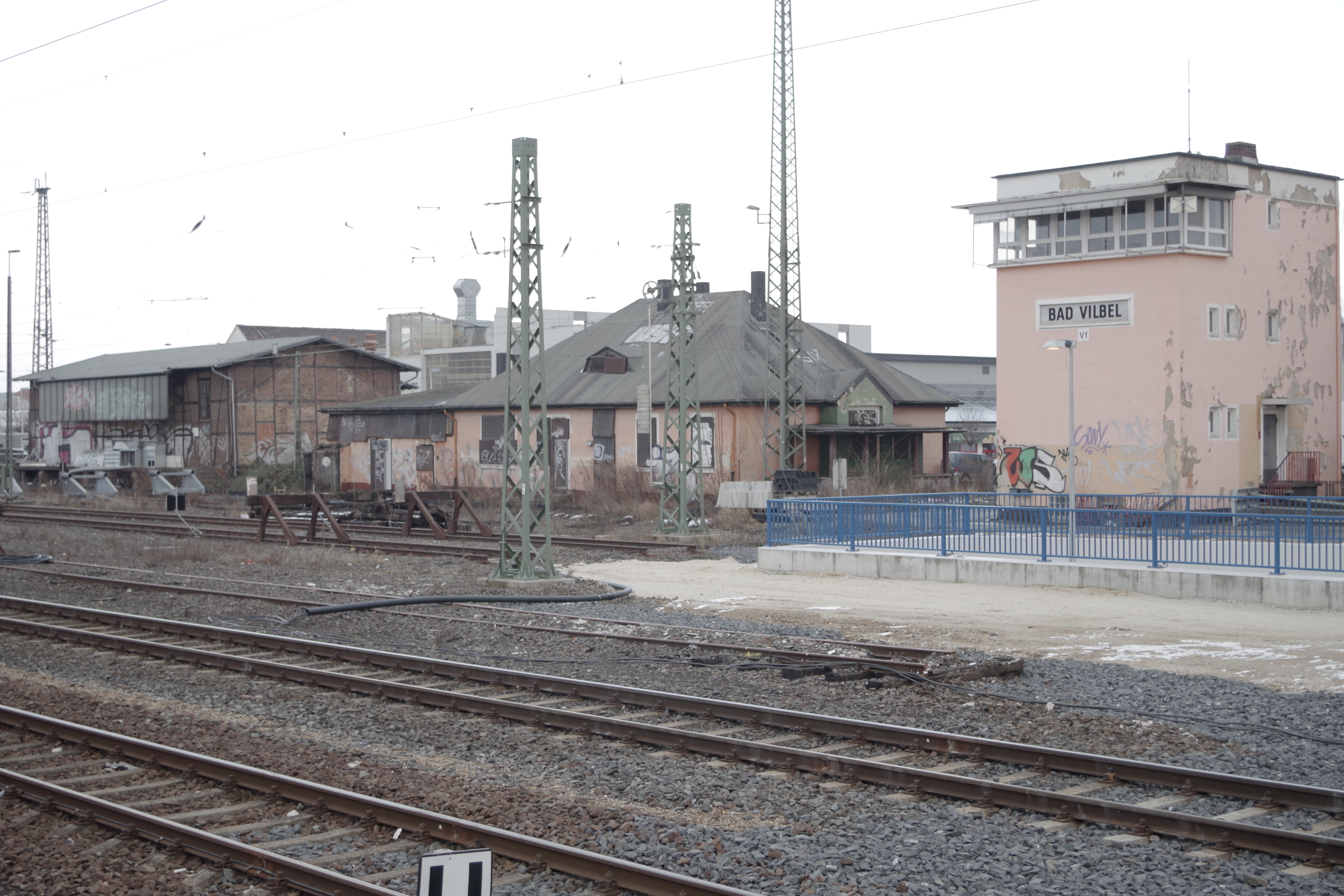
Bad Vilbel signal box

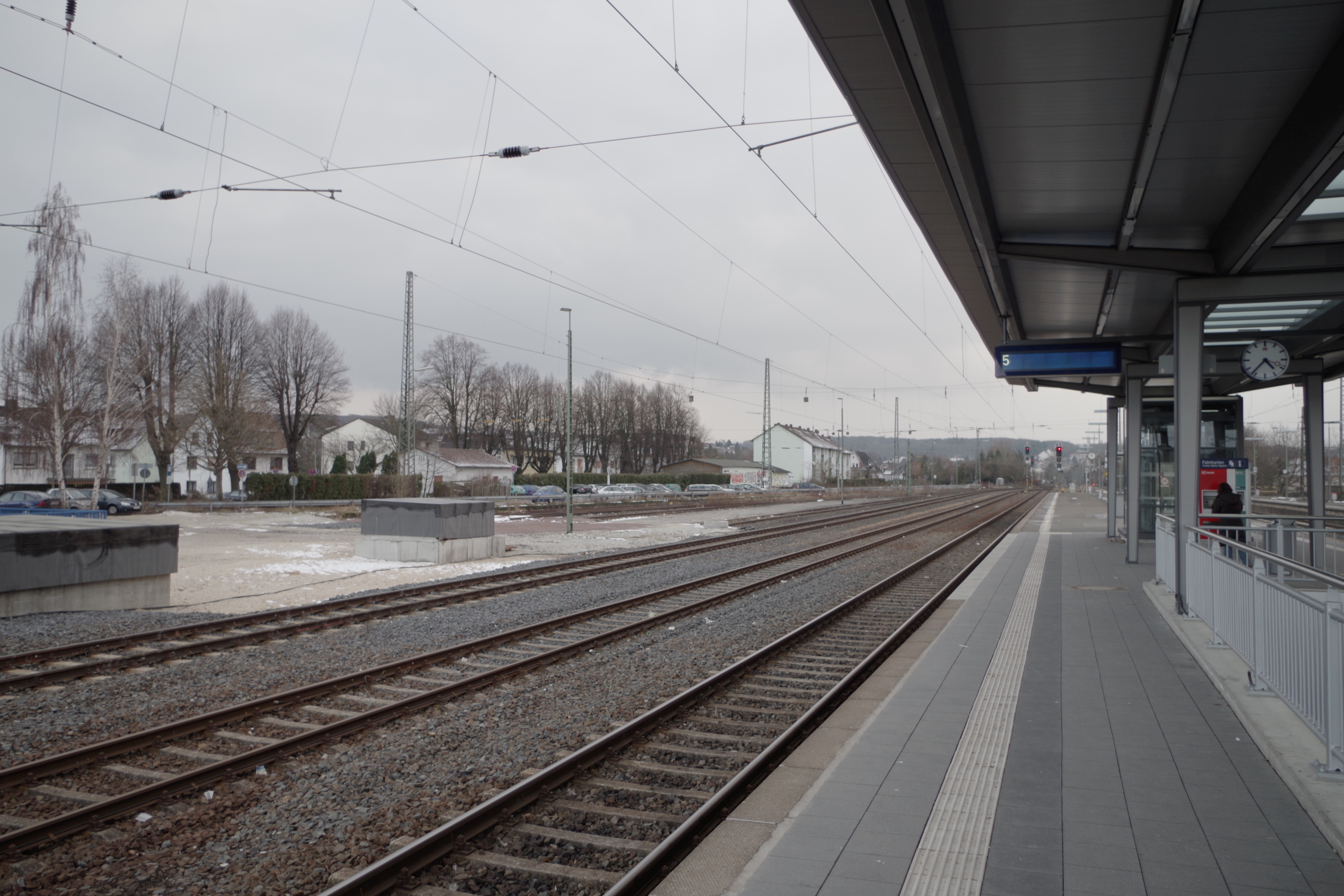
Track 5
