= Bad Vilbel–Glauburg-Stockheim railway =

Railway line in Germany

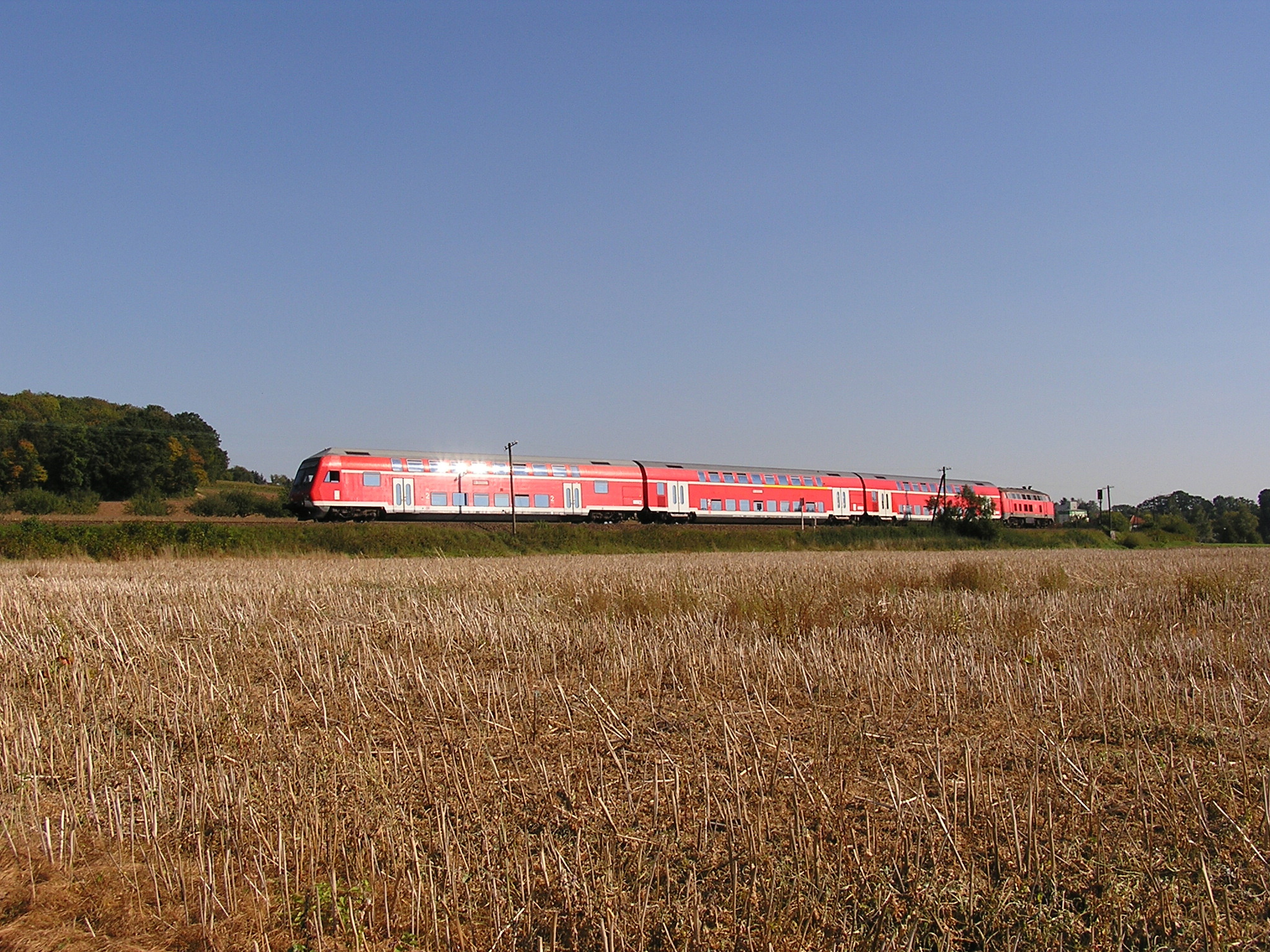
- class 218 with double-deck cars on the Büdesheim curve

Overview
- Native name: Niddertalbahn
- Line number: 3745
- Locale: Hesse, Germany

Service
- Route number: 634

Technical
- Line length: 31 km (19 mi)
- Track gauge: 1,435 mm (4 ft 8 1/2 in) standard gauge
- Operating speed: 80 km/h (50 mph)
Route map
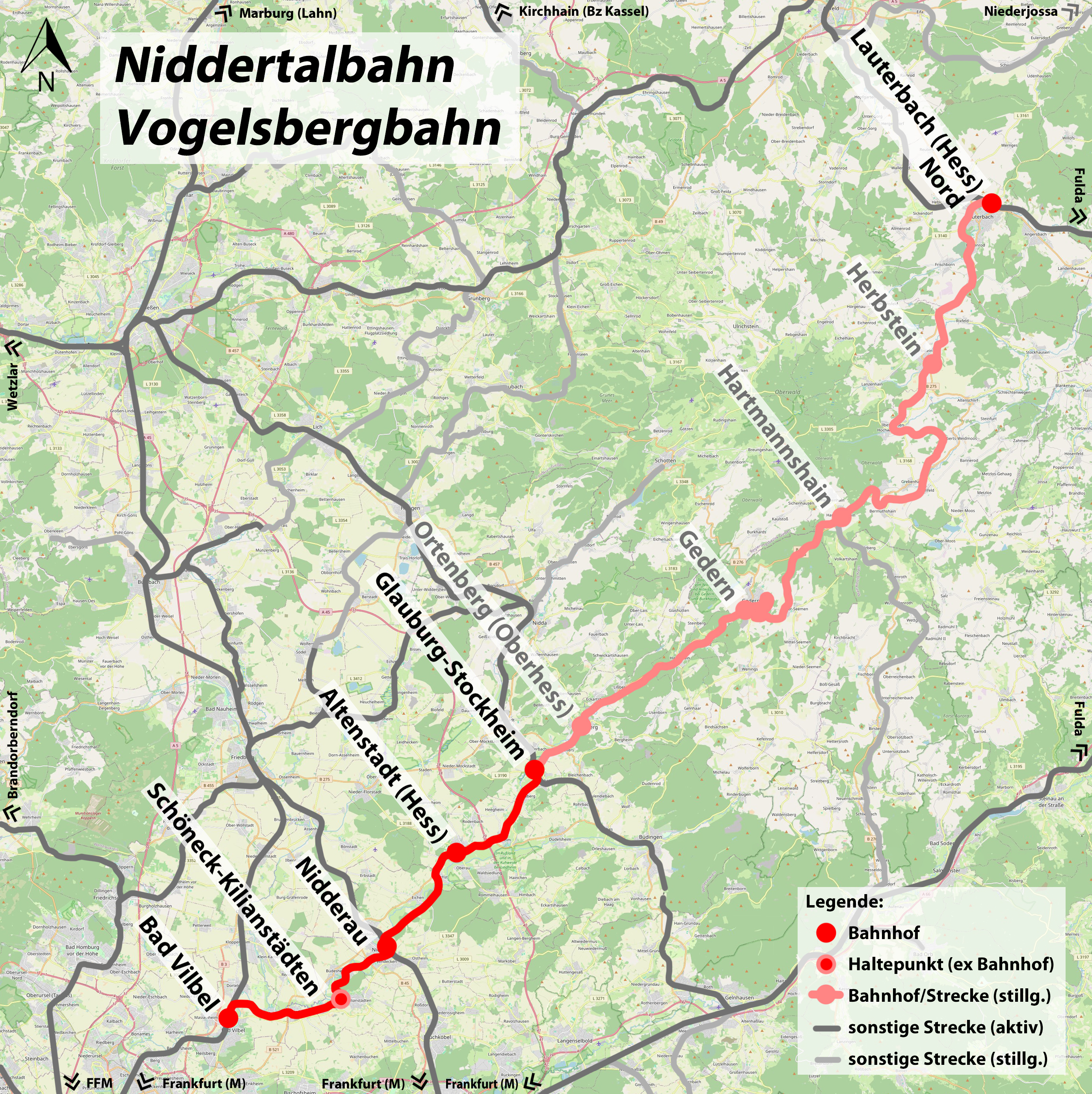
- Source: German railway atlas

The Bad Vilbel–Glauburg-Stockheim railway (also called the Niddertalbahn—Nidder Valley Railway) is a non-electrified branch line in the Wetterau and the Main-Kinzig districts of the German state of Hesse. It connects the Main-Weser Railway in Bad Vilbel with the Gießen–Gelnhausen railway in Glauburg-Stockheim.

It was used as an access route to the line now referred to as the Oberwaldbahn (Oberwald Railway) between Glauburg-Stockheim and Lauterbach, which connected to the Vogelsberg Railway. The section between Heldenbergen-Windecken (now Nidderau) and Stockheim was opened on 1 October 1905 and the section between Vilbel Nord (now Bad Vilbel) and Heldenbergen-Windecken was opened on 1 June 1907. It was operated by the Prussian-Hessian Railway Company (Preußisch-Hessische Eisenbahngemeinschaft).

== Route ==
The single track section of the Nidder Valley Railway branches off from the Main-Weser Railway at Bad Vilbel station and turns to the east shortly after the northern exit from the station, crosses the Nidda and shortly later reaches the halt of Bad Vilbel-Gronau. This is also the location of the mouth of the Nidder river, which it follows upstream to the end of the line. After Niederdorfelden station, which is a passing place, the line runs through the Büdesheim Tunnel between the municipalities of Schöneck and Nidderau. The tunnel was originally shorter but it was extended to 200 metres during its renovation in 2004. The original capstone of the tunnel portal, which has its construction years (1904–1906) carved into it and was built near the original Büdesheim station, is the last remaining relic of the old tunnel. Immediately after the tunnel, the line passes through the Nidderwiesen nature reserve and the edge of the town of Nidderau is soon reached at Windecken.

After a grade-separated crossing of the Friedberg–Hanau railway in Nidderau station, which was called Heldenbergen-Windecken for decades, the line follows the Friedberg–Hanau railway briefly, before turning towards Altenstadt. After a short section through a forest, it runs over a low embankment through an area that is subject to flooding by the Nidder to reach the forest again in Eichen. After a crossing of the Nidder before Höchst, the line soon reaches Altenstadt. Until about 1990, an industrial railway branched there to Waldsiedlung, which was three kilometres away. Less than an hour after leaving Bad Vilbel, after running through some meadows and crossing the Nidder again, the line finally reaches Glauburg and the station at the end of the line in the suburb of Stockheim where it meets the Gießen–Gelnhausen railway. Here it is the possible to continue towards Giessen or Gelnhausen.

An important traffic flow until the beginning of the 1990s was the daily "beet train" that ran in November and carried sugar beet from the region to the sugar factory in Friedberg and after its closure in 1981 to Groß-Gerau. Since the end of rail operations, this traffic is carried by road transport.

The line is 31 kilometres long between its terminal stations. The maximum line speed is 80 km/h. 35 tracks or roads cross the line and six level crossings are still not protected. One of these crossings was set to be abandoned, but the town of Bad Vilbel campaigned to keep it. This now has a 30 km/h speed limit.

== Operations ==
The Nidder Valley Railway was one of three railway lines integrated in the Frankfurter Verkehrsverbund (Frankfurt transport association, FVV) that was not operated as an S-Bahn line and was designated as an N-Bahn line. It is now operated by DB Regio Mitte as timetable route 634 on behalf of the FVV's successor, the Rhein-Main-Verkehrsverbund (Rhine-Main transport association, RMV), as its line 34. Almost all of the Regionalbahn services on weekdays and about two thirds on Saturdays run to Frankfurt (Main) Hauptbahnhof, while the rest begin and end in Bad Vilbel.

There has also been a weekend service since 4 May 2008. As a result, RMV bus route 5150 (previously 650) between Bad Vilbel and Nidderau was discontinued on that day. In addition, with the commencement of the summer timetable of 2008, the maximum speed of trains was increased from 60 to 80 km/h and the interval between services was shortened on weekdays. The contract with Deutsche Bahn AG runs from 2008 for 20 years. According to a local newspaper from the Wetteraukreis, RMV's deputy chairman of the supervisory board reported that an additional 260,000 train-kilometres would be provided on the line during this period.

In recent years, millions of Euros have been spent on modernising the line. As a result, all the trackwork has been renewed. Instead of concrete sleepers, steel Y-shaped sleepers have been installed. Furthermore, all halts and platforms in the stations of Nidderau and Stockheim have been rebuilt and the exit height for the double-deck cars has been raised to 76 centimetres. Initially only the platform of the Nidder Valley Railway was upgraded in Nidderau, while that of the Friedberg–Hanau railway was renewed in 2010.

On 19 October 2007, the computer-based interlocking in Altenstadt was connected with two remote modules in Niederdorfelden and Nidderau; previously signalling and points in Niederdorfelden and Altenstadt was operated mechanically by cable. At the same time, new stations were relocated and new platforms were built at both stations, with temporary platforms initially being built to shorten the period of full closure. At the same time, there was a shift from left to right-hand operations at the intermediate stations. The modernisation work continued until the spring of 2008. The line speed was increased after the completion of all the work.

Nevertheless, the tender for operations in 2010 initially received no bids from train operating companies. After concessions by the RMV, DB declared itself ready to tender for it. The explanation given by the RMV emphasised the cost of operating diesel locomotive-hauled double-deck sets in the peak periods; this led to plans to upgrade the line.

Since 1985, when its decommissioning was considered, the line has seen an increase in passenger numbers of 330% from 1,800 to 6,000 per day; the upgrade is expected to continue to have a positive impact on passenger numbers. As of 2015, about 7,000 passengers used the line each day.

=== Rolling stock ===
The Nidder Valley Railway was operated at the end of the 1990s in the peak hour with locomotive-hauled trains of Silberling coaches (n-Wagen) and in the off-peak with class 628 diesel multiple units.

From 2002, trains were composed of class 218 locomotives hauling double-deck, or sometimes Silberling, coaches. From the beginning of 2006, a class 628 set shuttled between Stockheim and Bad Vilbel in the off-peak hours as a replacement for trains consisting of a class 218 locomotive and Silberling coaches.

In December 2012, the majority of services changed over to of Siemens Desiro Classic (class 642) diesel railcars, mostly in coupled sets and the remaining trains consisting of a class 218 locomotive and double-deck coaches.

At the December 2014 timetable change, the class 218 diesel locomotives were replaced by class 245 (TRAXX) locomotives.

== Prospects ==
The RMV is planning to upgrade the line in response to demands from the neighbouring communities and districts. With electrification, the current costly and isolated operation with diesel railcars or diesel-hauled double-decker trains might be a thing of the past in time for the retendering of operations from 2028. In parallel selective upgrade measures (the installation of crossing tracks at stations, two-track sections) would make possible the intensification of services. A feasibility study is currently underway on the future of the Nidder Valley Railway, in which the options for its operation as an (electrified) regional railway, as a branch of S-Bahn line S6 or as an extension of U-Bahn line U5 are being compared.
