= Wolfsbach =

Wolfsbach may refer to:

- Wolfsbach, Lower Austria, a town in the district of Amstetten in Austria
- Wolfsbach (Vilicher Bach), a river of North Rhine-Westphalia, Germany, tributary of the Vilicher Bach
- Wolfsbach (Seemenbach), a river of Hesse, Germany, tributary of the Seemenbach
- Wolfsbach (Kahl), a river of Bavaria, Germany, tributary of the Kahl
