= Kälberbach =

Kälberbach may refer to:

- Kälberbach (Neuburg am Inn), a district of Neuburg am Inn, Bavaria, Germany
- Kälberbach (Schrozberg), a hamlet, part of Schrozberg, Baden-Württemberg, Germany
- Kälberbach (Seemenbach), river of Hesse, Germany, tributary of the Seemenbach
- Kälberbach (Elbbach), a river of Rhineland-Palatinate, Germany, tributary of the Elbbach
- Kälberbach (Werse), a river of North Rhine-Westphalia, Germany, tributary of the Werse
