= Krebsbach (Nidder) =

River in Germany

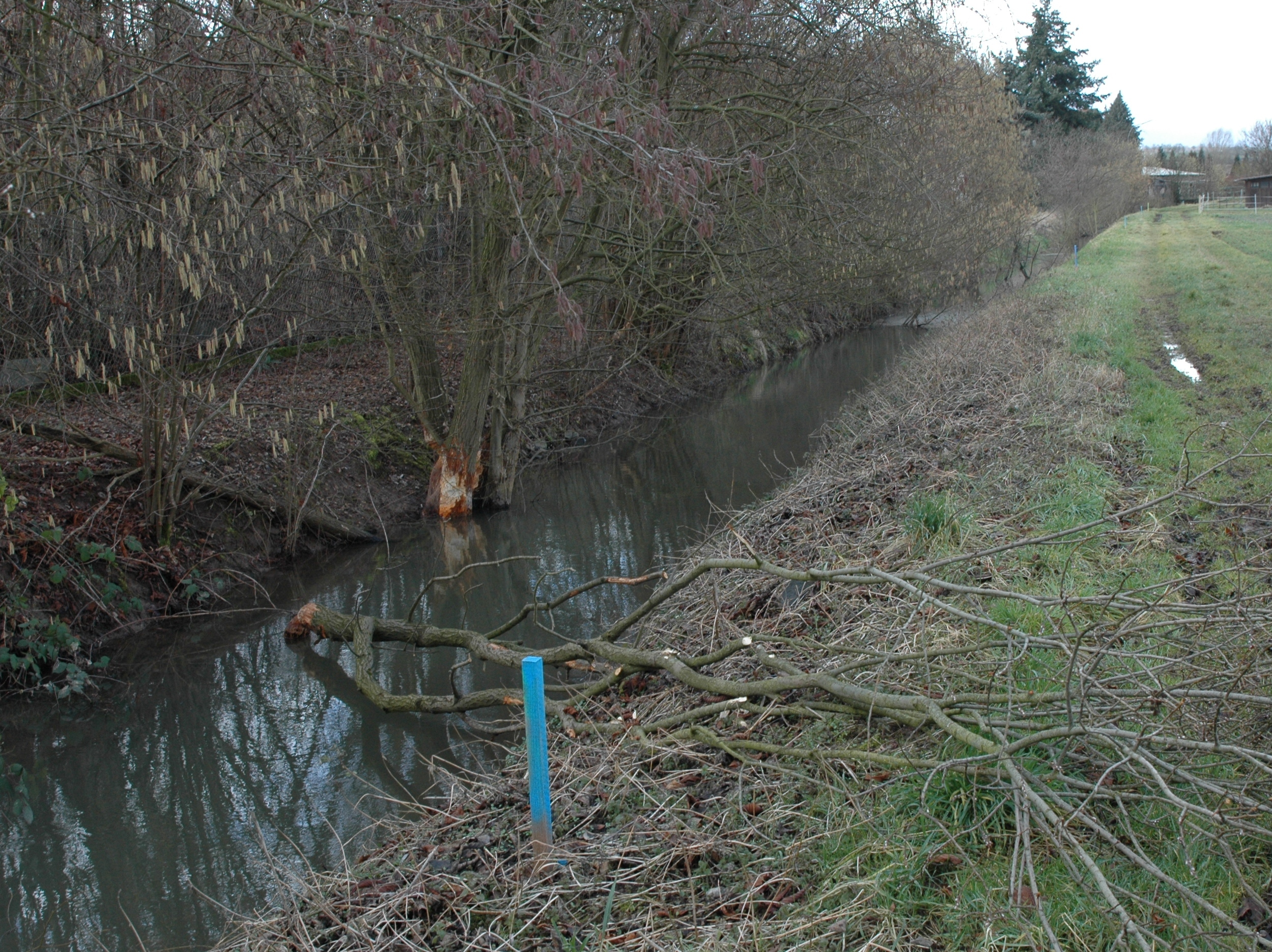

Location
- Country: Germany
- States: Hesse

Physical characteristics
- Mouth
  - location: Nidder
  - coordinates: 50°14′20″N 8°52′59″E

Basin features
- Progression: Nidder→ Nidda→ Main→ Rhine→ North Sea

Krebsbach is a river of Hesse, Germany. It flows into the Nidder near Nidderau.

== See also ==
- List of rivers of Hesse
