= Gänsbach (Merkenfritzerbach) =

River in Germany

Location
- Country: Germany
- States: Hesse

Physical characteristics
- Mouth
  - location: Merkenfritzerbach
  - coordinates: 50.4191°N 9.1969°E

Basin features
- Progression: Merkenfritzerbach→ Nidder→ Nidda→ Main→ Rhine→ North Sea

Gänsbach is a creek in Hesse, Germany.

It is about 4.5 kilometres long and one of the headstreams of the Merkenfritzerbach (the other is the Mühlbach river). However, some people consider the Gänsbach creek to be the upper part of the Mühlbach river.

== See also ==
- List of rivers of Hesse
