= Salzbach (Seemenbach) =

River in Germany

Location
- Country: Germany
- States: Hesse

Physical characteristics
- Mouth
  - location: Seemenbach
  - coordinates: 50.2877°N 9.1051°E

Basin features
- Progression: Seemenbach→ Nidder→ Nidda→ Main→ Rhine→ North Sea

Salzbach is a small river of Hesse, Germany. It is a left tributary of the Seemenbach in Büdingen.

== See also ==
- List of rivers of Hesse
