= Spießbach =

Spießbach may refer to:

- Spießbach (Nidder), a river of Hesse, Germany, tributary of the Nidder
- Spießbach (Sauer), a river of Rhineland-Palatinate, Germany, tributary of the Sauer
