= Nidderau station =

Railway station in Nidderau, Germany

Nidderau
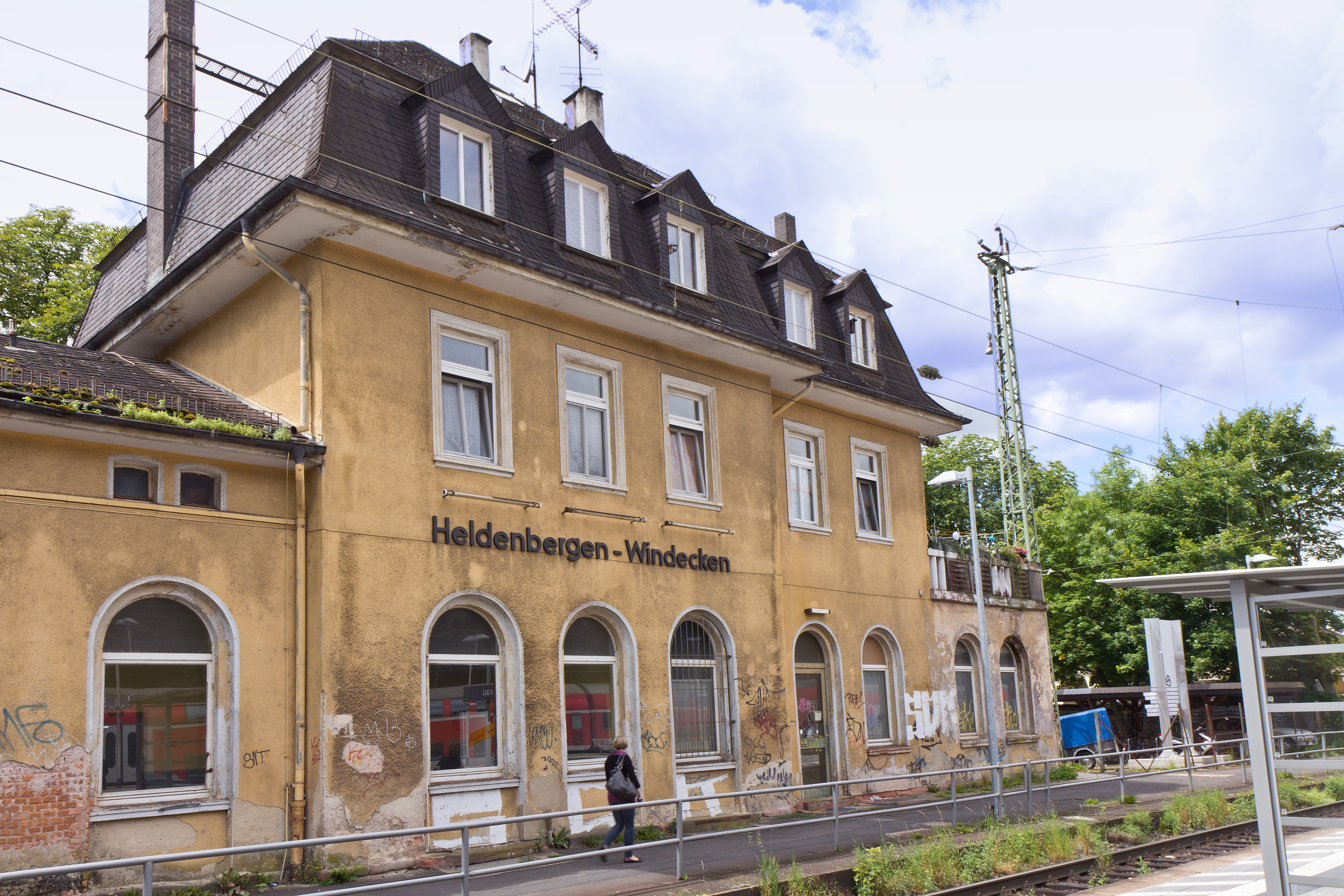

General information
- Location: Bahnhofstraße 108, Nidderau, Hesse; Germany
- Coordinates: 50°13′53″N 8°52′48″E
- Lines: Friedberg–Hanau (15.5 km); Bad Vilbel–Glauburg-Stockheim (14.8 km)
- Platforms: 4

Construction
- Accessible: No

Other information
- Station code: 2670
- DS100 code: FHWD
- IBNR: 8000158
- Category: 5
- Fare zone: : 2925
- Website: www.bahnhof.de

History
- Opened: 1 December 1879

Services
Preceding station	DB Regio Mitte	Following station
Nidderau-Windecken towards Frankfurt (Main) Hbf	RB 34	Nidderau-Eichen towards Glauburg-Stockheim
Assenheim towards Gießen	RB 49	Ostheim towards Hanau Hbf
Location
- Location within Hesse

Nidderau station is a junction station on the Friedberg–Hanau railway and the Nidder Valley Railway (German: Niddertalbahn) in the town of Nidderau in the German state of Hesse. The station is classified by Deutsche Bahn (DB) as a category 5 station.

== History ==
The station was established on 1 December 1879 under the name of Heldenbergen-Windecken as the end of the first section of the Friedberg–Hanau railway (Hanau to Heldenbergen-Windecken). The second section to Friedberg was opened for freight on 15 September 1881 and for passengers on the following 15 October. It was owned and operated by the Prussian state railways.

On 1 October 1905 the section of the Nidder Valley Railway from Heldenbergen-Windecken to Stockheim was opened. It was owned and operated by the Prussian-Hessian Railway Company (Königlich Preußische und Großherzoglich Hessischen Staatseisenbahnen). This turned Heldenbergen-Windecken into a major railway junction of the Wetterau.

Services on the Nidder Valley Railway were restored at weekends on 4 May 2008. The platforms at Nidderau station have been rebuilt. First the only platform on the Nidder Valley Railway was removed and replaced by a platform with a height of 76 centimetres to match the exit height of double-deck carriages used on the line. The platform of the Friedberg–Hanau line was renewed in 2010.

== Entrance building ==
The station’s stately entrance building is protected as a monument under the Hessian Heritage Act. It is a neo-baroque building in three sections: the oldest part was built in 1880/81 was the central part of the building with three bays and small windows half a storey below the roof eaves. The southerly part of the building was built in 1906 and completed with the opening of the Nidder Valley Railway. A short time later it was found that this extension was too small for the developing market, and in 1912 a 2 1/2-storey building was added to the north of the complex.

== Operations ==
On the Friedberg–Hanau railway, trains run between Friedberg and Hanau every half hour from Monday to Friday and at hourly intervals on Saturdays. The trains of the Friedberg–Hanau railway were operated until the summer of 2012 by Hessische Landesbahn (Hessian State Railway, HLB). From then it is intended that the line will be operated by DB Regio Hessen with Bombardier Talent 2 electric multiple units. The trains will then operate hourly between Hanau and Friedberg, and every second hour running from Hanau to Giessen as a direct service. Weekend services will also be reintroduced. Thus, the route, after ten years of operation by diesel multiple units, will again be operated by electric multiple units.

On the Nidder Valley Railway trains run every hour (every two hours on Sundays and public holidays) from Frankfurt Central Station or Bad Vilbel via Niederdorfelden, Nidderau and Altenstadt to Glauburg-Stockheim. In the peak hour a single additional service runs to Bad Vilbel. The trains are operated on the Nidder Valley Railway by DB.

There is a good connection between the two lines every hour allowing a change between each service.

Nidderau station is also served by some regional and city bus routes.
