= Mühlbach (Merkenfritzerbach) =

River in Hesse, Germany

Location
- Country: Germany
- States: Hesse

Physical characteristics
- Mouth
  - location: Merkenfritzerbach
  - coordinates: 50.4191°N 9.1969°E

Basin features
- Progression: Merkenfritzerbach→ Nidder→ Nidda→ Main→ Rhine→ North Sea

The Mühlbach is a creek of Hesse, Germany.

It is about 5 kilometres long and one of the headstreams of the Merkenfritzerbach (the other being the Gänsbach). Some consider the Gänsbach as the upper part of the Merkenfritzerbach and thus the Mühlbach as its tributary.

== See also ==
- List of rivers of Hesse
