= Merkenfritzerbach =

River in Germany

Location
- Country: Germany
- States: Hesse

Physical characteristics
- Mouth
  - location: Nidder
  - coordinates: 50.3928°N 9.1344°E

Basin features
- Progression: Nidder→ Nidda→ Main→ Rhine→ North Sea
- Tributaries
  - left: Mühlbach
  - right: Gänsbach

The Merkenfritzerbach is a small river of Hesse, Germany. It flows into the Nidder in Hirzenhain.

== See also ==
- List of rivers of Hesse
