= Seemenbach =

River in Germany

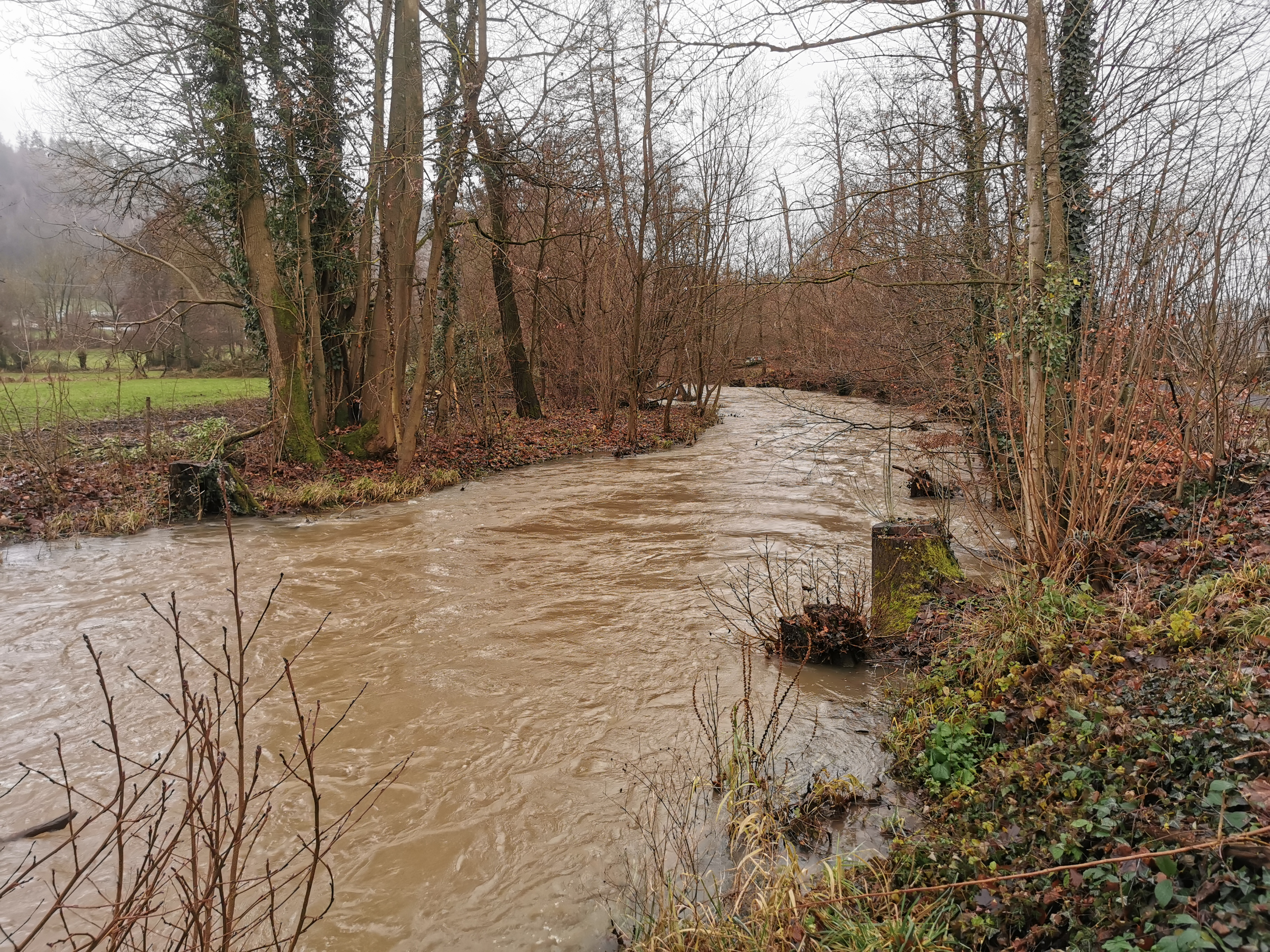
- The Seemenbach upstream of Büdingen

Location
- Country: Germany
- State: Hesse

Physical characteristics
- Mouth
  - location: Nidder
  - coordinates: 50.2868°N 8.9835°E
- Length: 37.4 km (23.2 mi)
- Basin size: 145 km^{2} (56 sq mi)

Basin features
- Progression: Nidder→ Nidda→ Main→ Rhine→ North Sea
- Tributaries
  - left: Salzbach
  - right: Kälberbach, Wolfsbach

The Seemenbach is a river of Hesse, Germany. It passes through Büdingen, and flows into the Nidder near Altenstadt.

== See also ==
- List of rivers of Hesse
