= Wolfsbach (Seemenbach) =

River in Germany

Location
- Country: Germany
- State: Hesse

Physical characteristics
- Mouth
  - location: Seemenbach
  - coordinates: 50.2875°N 9.0817°E
- Length: 13.3 km (8.3 mi)

Basin features
- Progression: Seemenbach→ Nidder→ Nidda→ Main→ Rhine→ North Sea

Wolfsbach mouth

Wolfsbach is a river of Hesse, Germany. It is a right tributary of the Seemenbach near Büdingen.

== See also ==
- List of rivers of Hesse
