= Hanau Nord station =

Railway station in Hanau, Germany

Hanau Nord
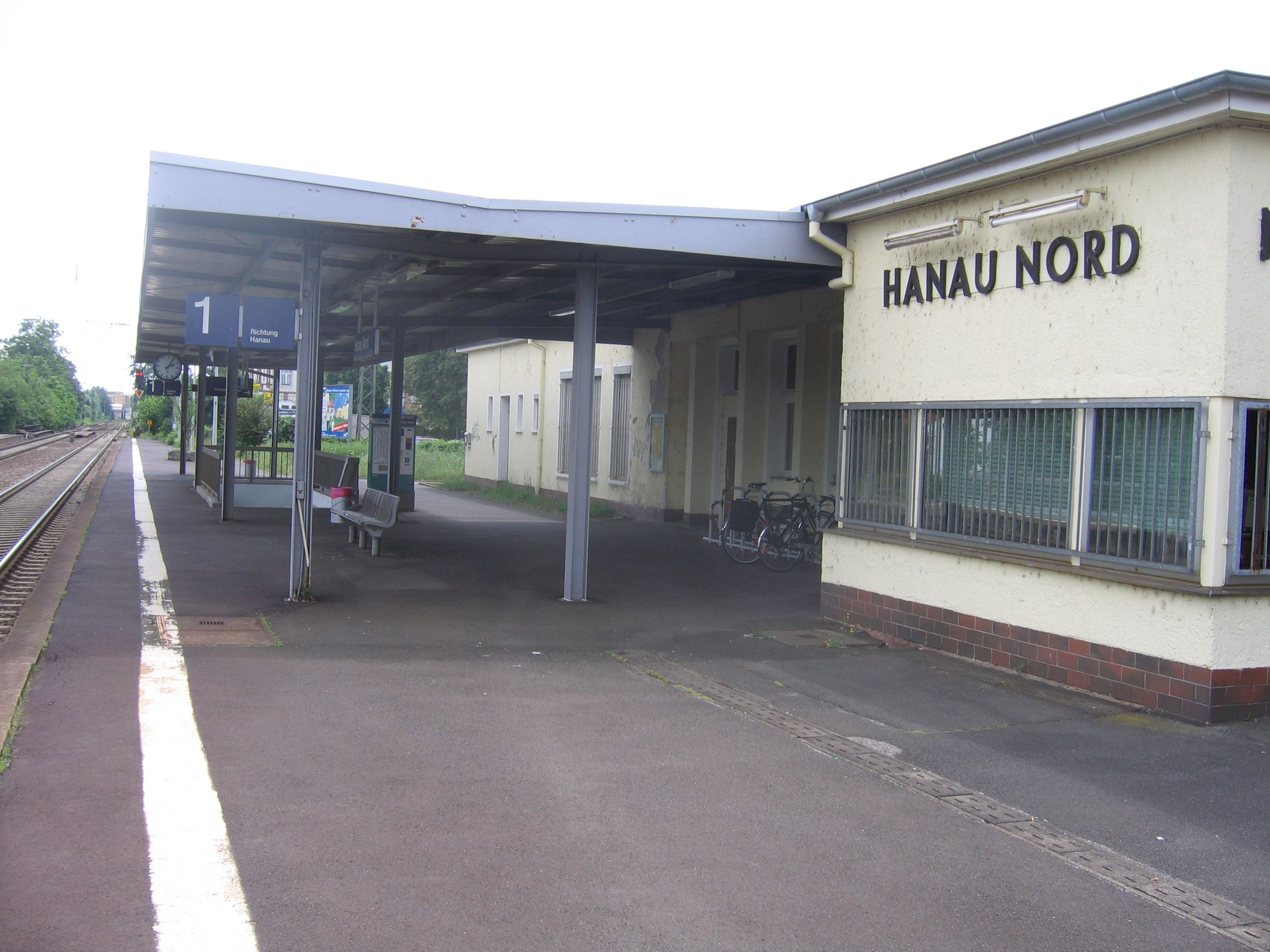
- 2007

General information
- Location: Friedberger Straße 2; 63452 Hanau; Hesse; Germany
- Coordinates: 50.1419°N 8.9254°E
- Owner: Deutsche Bahn
- Operator: DB Station&Service
- Lines: Friedberg–Hanau railway (KBS 633); Hanau Light Railway
- Platforms: 2 side platforms
- Tracks: 2
- Train operators: Hessische Landesbahn
- Connections: RB 49

Construction
- Parking: yes
- Cycle facilities: yes
- Accessible: partly

Other information
- Station code: 2538
- DS100 code: FHN
- IBNR: 8002572
- Category: 5
- Fare zone: : 3001
- Website: www.bahnhof.de

Services
Preceding station	DB Regio Mitte	Following station
Bruchköbel towards Gießen	RB 49	Hanau Hbf Terminus
Location
- Location within Hesse Location within Germany Location within Europe

Hanau Nord station is a railway station in the municipality of Hanau, located in the Main-Kinzig-Kreis in Hesse, Germany.
