= Kälberbach (Seemenbach) =

River in Germany

Location
- Country: Germany
- States: Hesse

Physical characteristics
- Mouth
  - location: Seemenbach
  - coordinates: 50.2893°N 9.1112°E

Basin features
- Progression: Seemenbach→ Nidder→ Nidda→ Main→ Rhine→ North Sea

The Kälberbach is a small river of Hesse, Germany. It is a right tributary of the Seemenbach, into which it flows in Büdingen.

The Kälberbach rises at an altitude of 353 meters above sea level northwest of the Büdingen district of Michelau. Its 8.3 km long course ends approximately 218 meters below its source, giving it an average bed gradient of 26‰.

== See also ==
- List of rivers of Hesse
