= Friedberg–Hanau railway =

Railway line in Germany

Friedberg–Hanau Railway

Overview
- Native name: Bahnstrecke Friedberg—Hanau
- Status: Operational
- Owner: Deutsche Bahn
- Line number: 3742
- Locale: Hesse, Germany
- Termini: Friedberg; Hanau Hbf
- Stations: 7

Service
- Type: Heavy rail, passenger/freight rail Regional rail
- Route number: 633
- Operator(s): DB Bahn

History
- Opened: 1 December 1879
- Completed: 15 September 1881

Technical
- Line length: 32.2 km (20.0 mi)
- Number of tracks: Double track
- Track gauge: 1,435 mm (4 ft 8 1/2 in) standard gauge
- Electrification: 15 kV/16.7 Hz AC Overhead line
- Operating speed: 140 km/h (87 mph)

The Friedberg–Hanau railway is a 32.2 km long double-track, electrified mainline in the German state of Hesse. It connects Friedberg and Hanau. The line has the timetable number of 633 and it is integrated in the Rhein-Main-Verkehrsverbund (Rhine Main Transport Association) as Regionalbahn service RB 49.

== History ==
The line was authorised under an act of the Prussian parliament of 11 June 1873 and opened by the Prussian state railways in two phases. The first section was opened from Hanau to Heldenbergen-Windecken (now Nidderau) on 1 December 1879. The second section opened from Heldenbergen-Windecken to Friedberg for freight on 15 September 1881 and for passenger traffic on 15 October 1881.

== Significance ==
The importance of the route lies in freight traffic. It forms part of a trunk route from the Ruhr region to Bavaria via the Ruhr–Sieg railway, the Dill Railway and the Main–Weser Railway from Giessen to Friedberg via and continuing from Hanau via the Main–Spessart Railway.

The line is used as a detour during operational failures that occasionally occur due to the high utilisation of the Main–Weser Railway between Frankfurt and Friedberg or during construction work.

In passenger transport, the line was formerly served by the Regionalbahn trains of the Hessische Landesbahn (HLB), using GTW 2/6 rolling stock. There were no passenger services from Saturday evening until Monday morning and on public holidays. Although the line is electrified, the only vehicles used for passenger transport are diesel multiple units.

Since December 2011, DB Regio Hessen has had the concession to operate services on the line with Bombardier Talent 2 electric multiple units. As the vehicles were not yet approved for operations the line continued to be served by GTW 2-6 operated by HLB. These were staffed by DB Regio Hessen. From June 2013, DB Regio Hessen has operated this service at 2-hour intervals (every hour at peak hour on weekdays) with Talent vehicles, now numbered as RB 49.

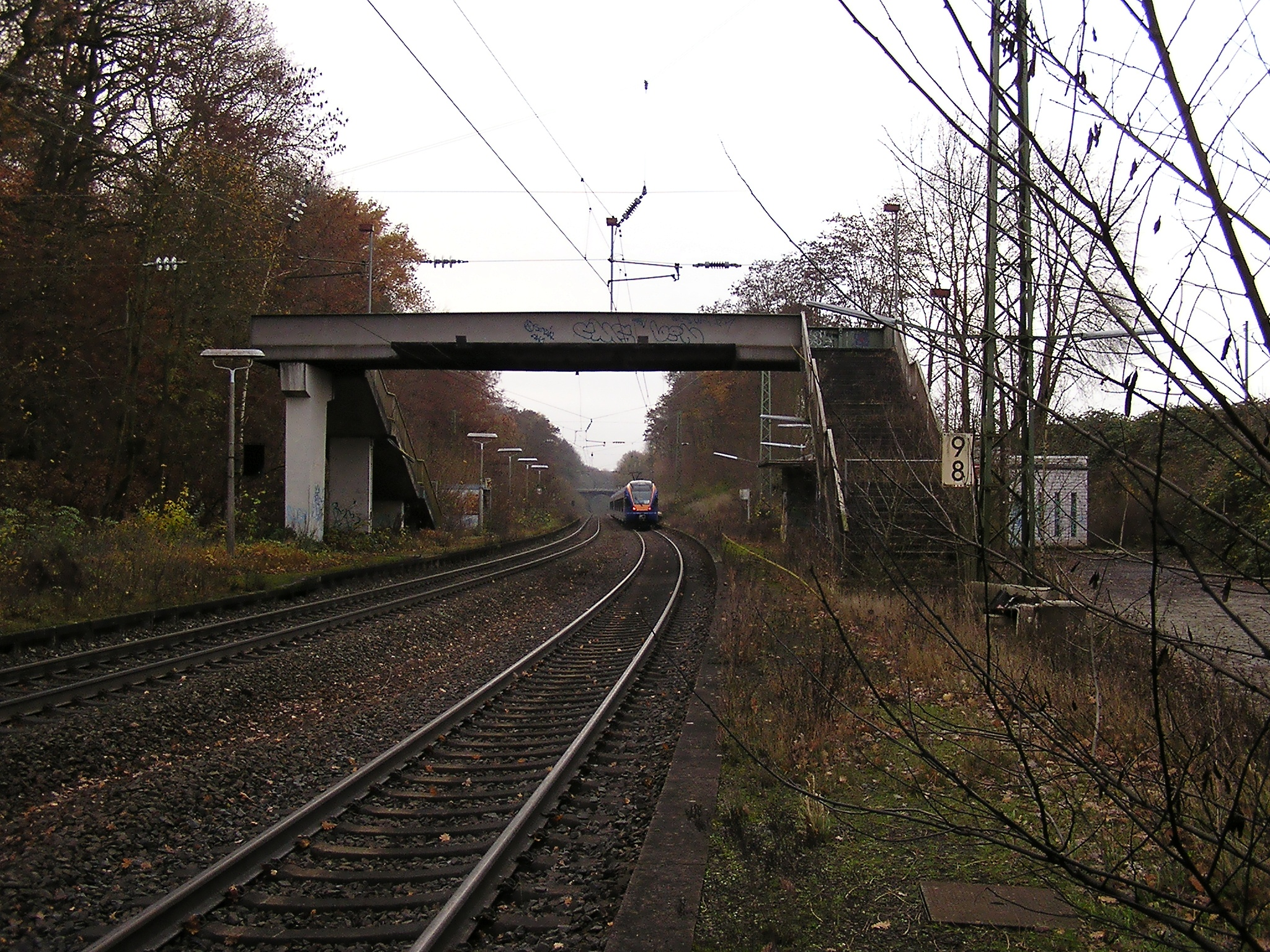
A FLIRT passes through the former Erbstadt-Kaichen station

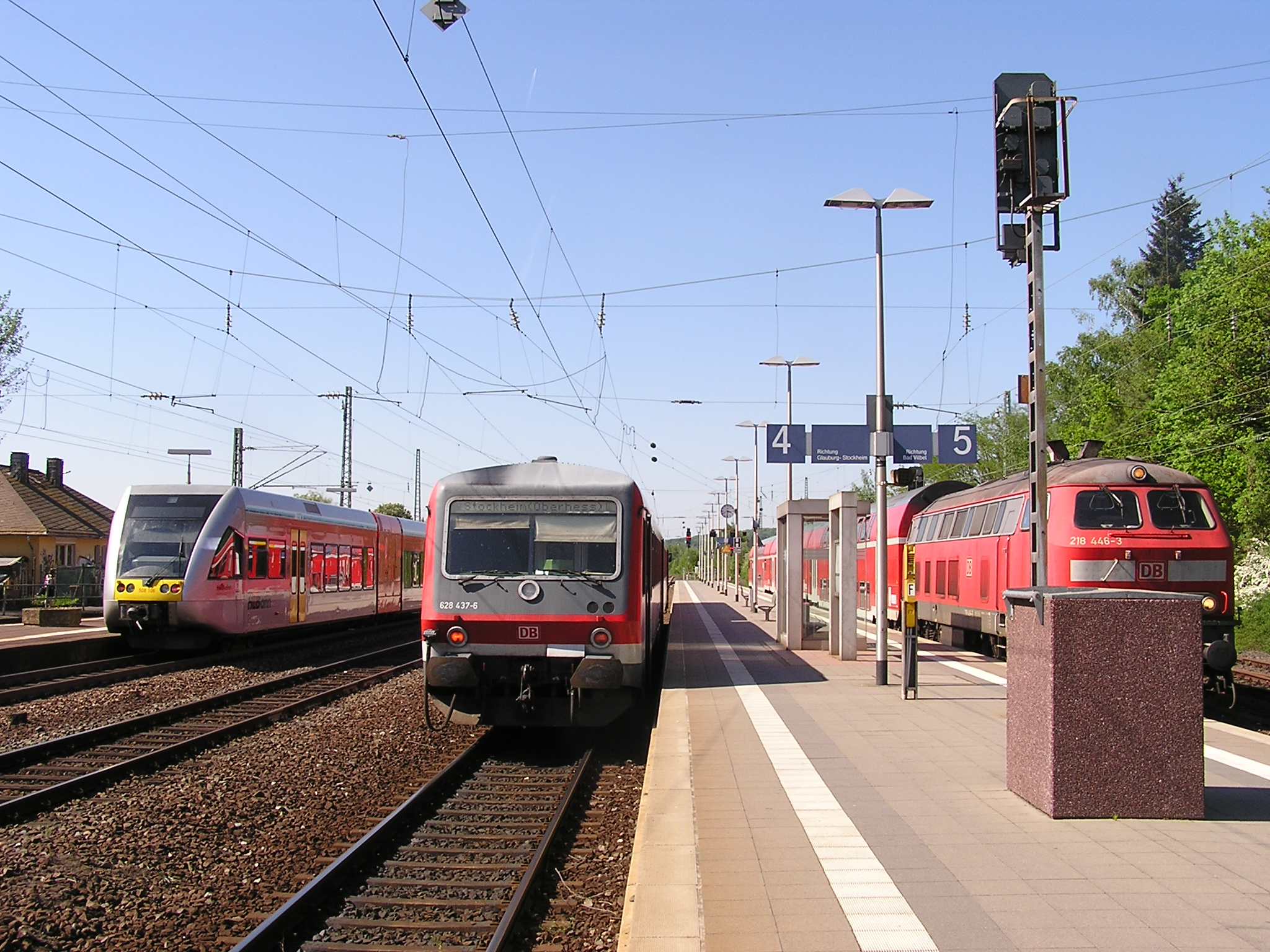
Crossing of GTW 2/6 and trains on the Nidder Valley Railway in Nidderau

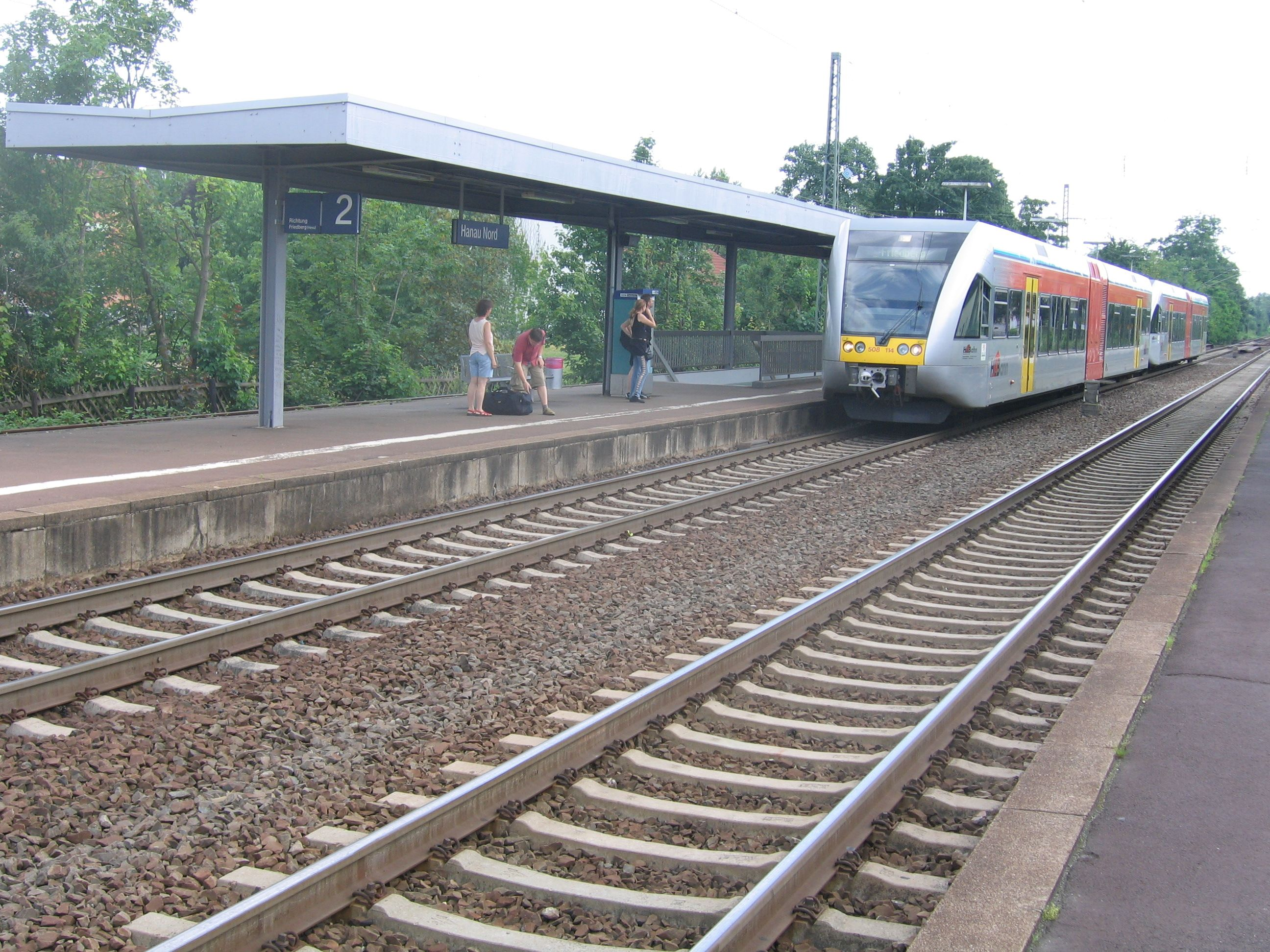
GTW 2/6 coupled set towards Friedberg stops in Hanau Nord

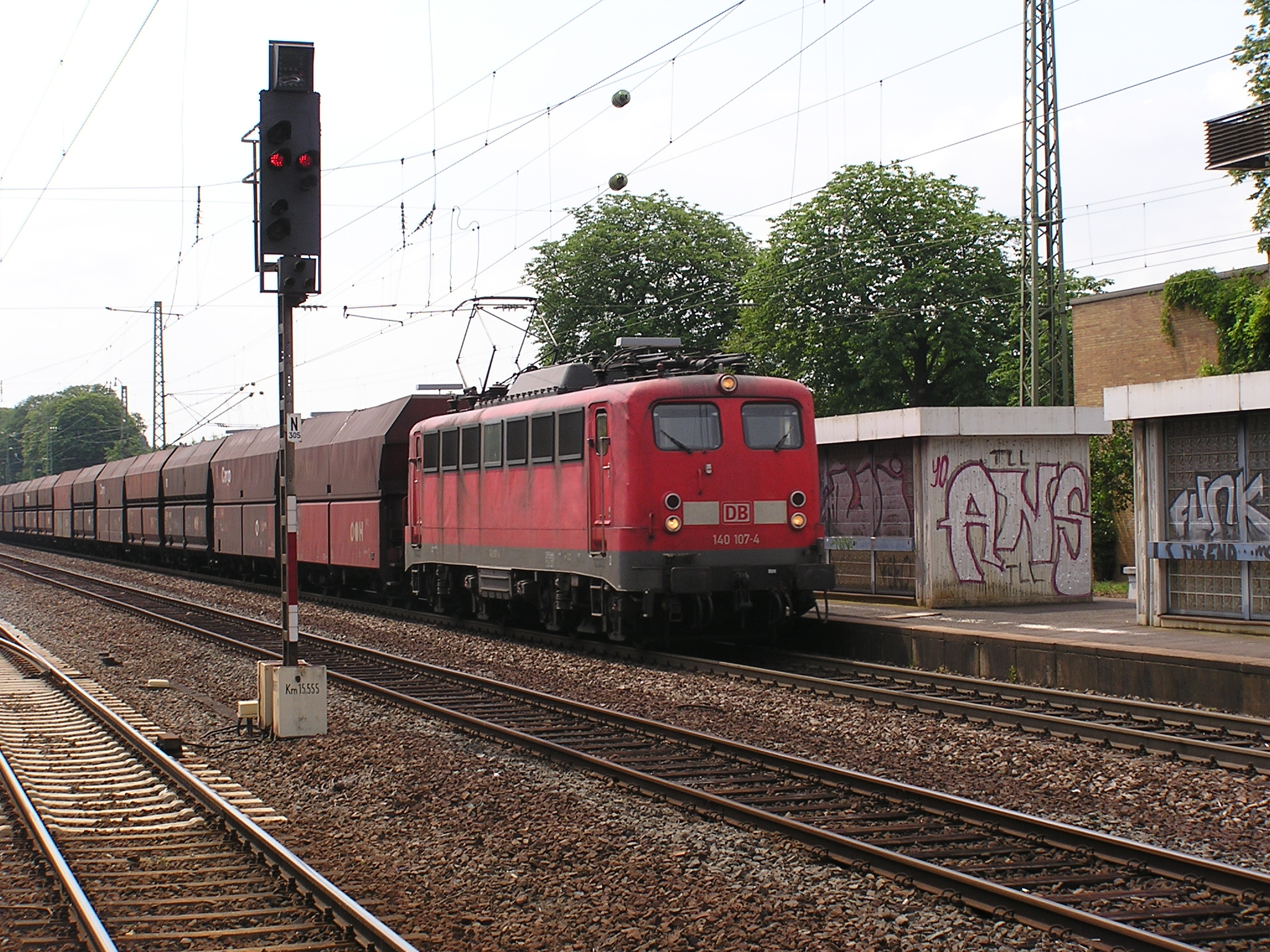
Freight train in Nidderau
