= Wolfsbach (Vilicher Bach) =

River in Germany

Location
- Country: Germany
- State: North Rhine-Westphalia

Physical characteristics
- Mouth
  - location: Vilicher Bach
  - coordinates: 50.7519°N 7.1567°E

Basin features
- Progression: Vilicher Bach→ Rhine→ North Sea

Wolfsbach is a small river of North Rhine-Westphalia, Germany. It is 2.8 km (1.7 mi) long and is a right tributary of the Vilicher Bach.

== See also ==
- List of rivers of North Rhine-Westphalia
