= Groß Karben station =

Railway station in Karben, Germany

Groß Karben
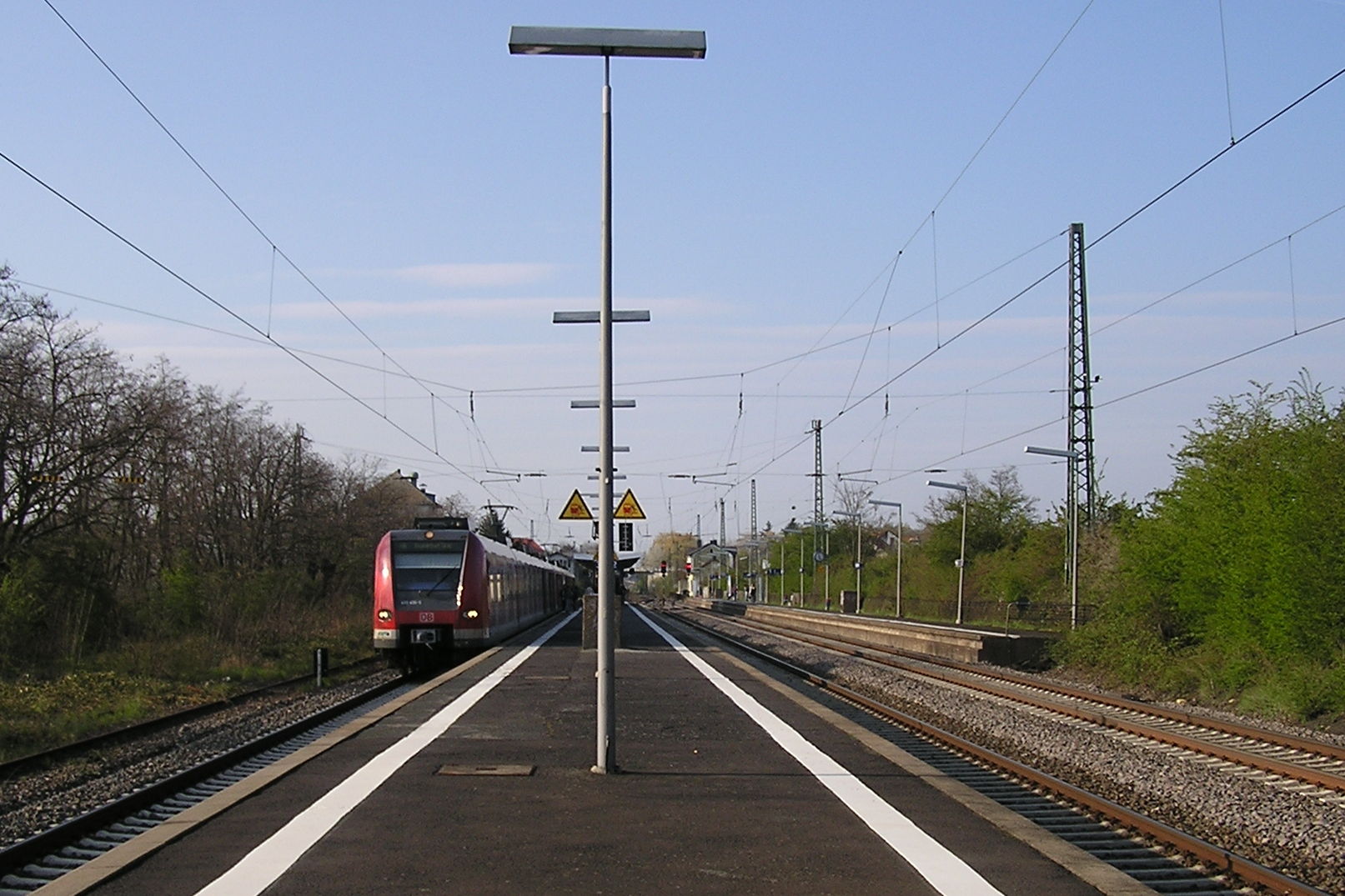

General information
- Location: Bahnhofstr. 200; Karben, Hesse; Germany
- Coordinates: 50°13′55″N 8°45′13″E
- Lines: Main–Weser Railway (178.4 km) (KBS 645.6)
- Platforms: 3

Construction
- Accessible: Platform 1 only

Other information
- Station code: 2303
- DS100 code: FGKA
- IBNR: 8002388
- Category: 4
- Fare zone: : 2615
- Website: www.bahnhof.de

History
- Opened: 10 May 1850

Services
Preceding station	Rhine-Main S-Bahn	Following station
Karben-Okarben towards Friedberg (Hess)	S6 (Rhine-Main S-Bahn)	Bad Vilbel-Dortelweil towards Darmstadt Hbf
Location
- Location within Hesse

Groß Karben station is a station at the 178.4 km mark on the Main–Weser Railway from Kassel via Marburg and Giessen to Frankfurt in the German state of Hesse. It is located approximately one kilometre from Groß Karben, now a district of Karben, and is located on the outskirts of the Karben district of Kloppenheim. Unlike the district of Groß-Karben, it is spelled without a hyphen. The station is classified by Deutsche Bahn as a category 5 station.

== History ==
Groß Karben station was opened on 10 May 1850 as part of the section of the Main-Weser Railway from Frankfurt to Friedberg. The entire Main–Weser Railway between Kassel and Frankfurt was completed on 15 May 1852.

On 28 January 1907, there was a serious railway accident at Taunusbrunnen immediately north of the station with one dead and two seriously injured.

South of the railway an industrial siding branches off to the east to a factory now owned by Continental Automotive Systems; this siding is no longer used.

Groß Karben station has been served by line S6 of the Rhine-Main S-Bahn since 28 May 1978.

== Entrance building ==
The station's entrance building is a two-story, pitched roofed building with its eaves facing the railway with a projecting porch. It is the only station in the Wetterau that has been preserved from the formation of the Main-Weser Railway in its original appearance. It is classified as a monument under the Hessian Heritage Act.

== Services ==
Groß Karben station now (2012) has three platform tracks on two platforms (a side and a central platform). It is served by line S6 of the Rhine-Main S-Bahn. The S-Bahn runs at 15-minute intervals on weekdays from Friedberg and Groß Karben via Bad Vilbel and the Frankfurt City Tunnel to Frankfurt South station. Every second train starts and ends in Groß Karben. On Saturdays, Sundays and public holidays, as well as in the early morning and the evening on weekdays, S-Bahn services operate at 30-minute intervals from Friedberg to Frankfurt Süd. Regional, long-distance and freight trains run through the station without stopping.

== Planning ==
Between Frankfurt West and Friedberg the two tracks of the Main-Weser Railway is shared by S-Bahn, regional, long-distance and freight traffic. To improve operations, this section of the line is being upgraded from two to four tracks by about 2016. Planning permission for this project has already been granted in the Bad Vilbel area.
