= Glauburg =

- Municipality
- Coat of arms

- Location of Glauburg within Wetteraukreis district
- Interactive map of Glauburg
- Location within Germany Location within Hesse
- Coordinates: 50°19′N 9°0′E
- Country: Germany
- State: Hesse
- Admin. region: Darmstadt
- District: Wetteraukreis
- Subdivisions: 2 districts

Government
  - Mayor (2021–27): Henrike Strauch (SPD)

Area
  - Total: 12.67 km^{2} (4.89 sq mi)
- Elevation: 130 m (430 ft)

Population (2025-12-31)
  - Total: 2,989
  - Density: 235.9/km^{2} (611.0/sq mi)
- Time zone: UTC+01:00 (CET)
  - Summer (DST): UTC+02:00 (CEST)
- Postal codes: 63695
- Dialling codes: 06041
- Vehicle registration: FB
- Website: www.glauburg.de

Glauburg (German pronunciation: [ˈɡlaʊbʊʁk]) is a municipality in the Wetteraukreis, in Hesse, Germany. It is located approximately 33 kilometers northeast of Frankfurt am Main. Glauburg is a municipality of Glauberg and Stockheim. The city hall of Glauburg is in Stockheim.

The municipality was created in the municipal reform in 1971 from the districts of Glauberg and Stockheim. It is not far from the A 45 autobahn (Giessen-Hanau). Glauburg-Stockheim station is at the junction of the Frankfurt–Stockheim and the Gießen–Gelnhausen lines. The valley in the neighborhood Nidder Glauburg has 3300 inhabitants and a good infrastructure, leading to a high standard of living and quality of life. Mountain birds are present in several protected areas around Glauberg, which has a number of hiking trails.

== History ==
Documented Stockheim first appears 1198; Glauberg is mentioned in the year 802 the first time. Glauburg Upper Hesse is situated at the foot of Glauberg that the new town was also the name. The fortifications on the Glauberg have long been known. The findings indicate a settlement of the high plateau of the Neolithic Age to the Middle Ages. The historic site is therefore one of the most important settlements in the region. With the discovery in the years 1994-2000 a royal grave mound with several graves, a processional way and statues under which an almost perfectly preserved sandstone Tele was a symbol of the Celtic world at Glauberg, Glauburg is now well known in archaeological circles. Glauburg is the seat of the Celtic World Association - Archaeological sites in Germany eV.

== Population ==
- Stockheim 2035
- Glauberg 1357
- Glauburg 3392
