= Vilicher Bach =

River in Germany

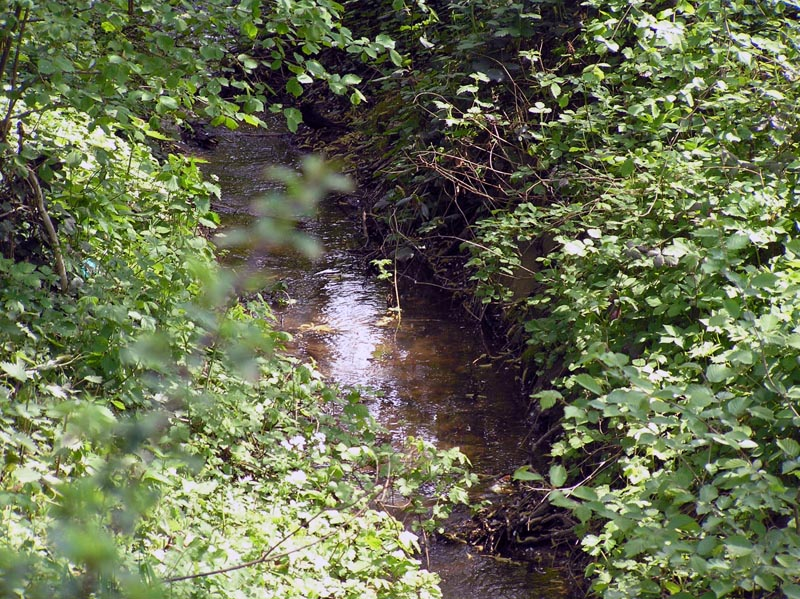

Location
- Country: Germany
- State: North Rhine-Westphalia

Physical characteristics
- Mouth
  - location: Rhine
  - coordinates: 50.7534°N 7.1061°E

Basin features
- Progression: Rhine→ North Sea

Vilicher Bach (also partly: Mühlenbach) is a river of North Rhine-Westphalia, Germany. It is 8.9 km (5.5 mi) long and flows into the Rhine as a right tributary near Bonn.

== See also ==
- List of rivers of North Rhine-Westphalia
