= Glauburg-Stockheim station =

Railway station in Glauburg, Germany

Glauburg Stockheim
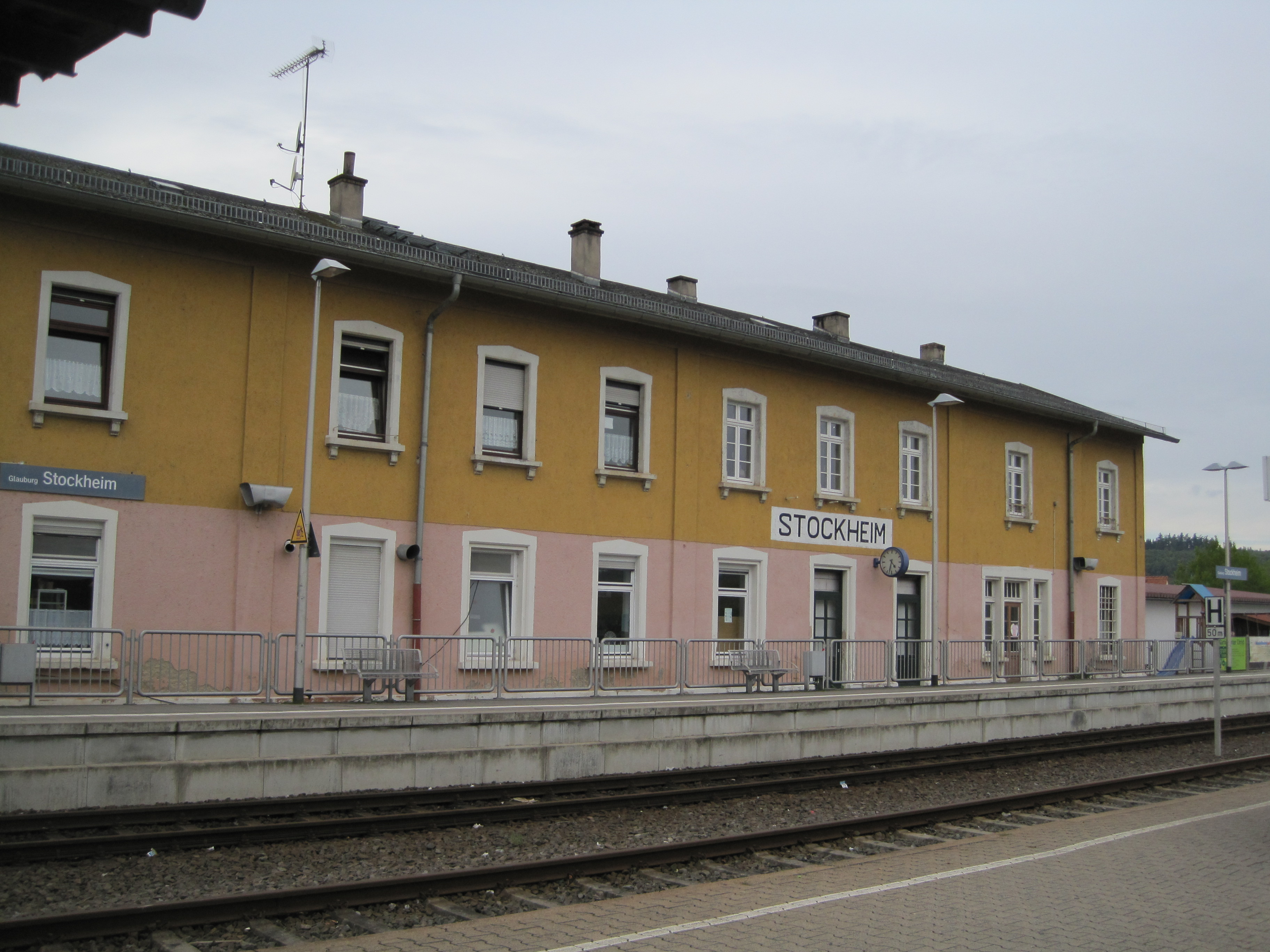

General information
- Location: Bahnhofstraße 61; Glauburg, Hesse; Germany
- Coordinates: 50°19′38″N 9°00′37″E
- Lines: Gießen–Gelnhausen railway (45.8 km); Nidda Valley Railway (31.0 km); Oberwald Railway (31.0 km) (closed)
- Platforms: 3

Construction
- Accessible: Platform 1 only

Other information
- Station code: 6033
- DS100 code: FSTM
- IBNR: 8000347
- Category: 4
- Fare zone: : 2741
- Website: www.bahnhof.de

History
- Opened: 30 October 1870

Services
Preceding station	DB Regio Mitte	Following station
Glauburg-Glauberg towards Frankfurt (Main) Hbf	RB 34	Terminus
Preceding station	Hessische Landesbahn	Following station
Effolderbach towards Gießen	RB 46	Bleichenbach (Oberhess) towards Gelnhausen
Location
- Location within Hesse

Glauburg-Stockheim station is a station on the Gießen–Gelnhausen railway in the town of Glauburg in the German state of Hesse. It is also at the end of the Bad Vilbel–Glauburg-Stockheim railway from Bad Vilbel. The Oberwald Railway (Oberwaldbahn) to Lauterbach began here from 1 October 1888 until 1 June 1984. The station is classified by Deutsche Bahn (DB) as a category 5 station.

The station is located in the area of the Rhein-Main-Verkehrsverbund (Rhine-Main Transport Association, RMV).

== History ==
The station was opened on 30 October 1870 with opening of the end of the third section of the Gießen–Gelnhausen railway (Nidda–Büdingen) by the Upper Hessian Railway Company (Oberhessische Eisenbahn-Gesellschaft). The station was originally called Stockheim (Oberhess). On 1 October 1888, the Stockheim–Gedern section of the Oberwald Railway was opened. This section was, in effect, the oldest part of the Nidda Valley Railway. Exactly 17 years later, on 1 October 1905, the Nidda Valley Railway was extended to the south to Nidderau. There was no through traffic between Bad Vilbel and Lauterbach until 1 June 1907.

Passenger services on the Stockheim–Lauterbach line ended on 28 September 1975. Freight traffic operated on the Stockheim–Gedern line until 1 June 1984. On 10 June 2001, the whole line between Stockheim and Lauterbach was closed.

In 2008, the Nidda Valley Railway was upgraded. This included, among other things, the renewal of all the stations. All the platforms at the halts and the stations of Nidderau, Niederdorfelden and Glauburg-Stockheim were renewed and raised to the level of the exits of the double-deck coaches used on the line (76 cm). Since 4 May 2008, services have been operated on the line at weekends. On the same day RMV bus route 5150 (formerly DB bus route 650), which had run between Bad Vilbel and Nidderau, was closed completely.

== Platforms ==
The station has three platform tracks. The “house” platform (platform 1) is used exclusively for services on the Nidda Valley Railway towards Nidderau, Bad Vilbel and Frankfurt Central Station. The central platform (tracks 2 and 3) is served primarily by Hessische Landesbahn services on the Gießen–Gelnhausen railway to Giessen via Nidda, Hungen and Lich and to the south towards Gelnhausen via Büdingen. Trains in both directions use track 2, track 3 is usually used only to allow trains to pass. Occasionally trains from Bad Vilbel running on the Nidda Valley Railway terminate on track 3.

=== Entrance building ===
The Nidda Valley Railway is popularly known as the Stockheimer Lieschen ("Stockheim Lizzie") because there used to be a station restaurant in Glauburg-Stockheim station operated by Liesel Brand, where many passengers and railway staff stopped at the end of the line.

After long years of neglect, the station building was privatised in 2006 and partially restored. The station restaurant has been modernised and reopened as a bistro. In the former offices, there is a model railway (Modellbahnhof Stockheim), which has a focus on the Nidda Valley Railway during the 1950s and 1960s.

== Operations ==
On weekdays, Deutsche Bahn operates RB 34 services on the Nidda Valley Railway every hour to Frankfurt Hauptbahnhof. Additional services run to Bad Vilbel from Monday to Friday during peak hours to reduce the interval between services to half an hour. On Sundays the trains run every two hours only as far as Bad Vilbel.

On the Gießen–Gelnhausen railway, RB 46 services are operated by Hessische Landesbahn with GTW 2/6 sets at hourly intervals between Gießen and Gelnhausen. In the morning peak and after lunch an extra service runs to Gelnhausen and in the evening peak an extra service runs from Gelnhausen.

=== Buses ===
Stockheim station is served by several regional bus routes. From 1 May to 31 October each year routes VB-90 to VB-95 of the Vogelsberger Vulkan-Express (Vogelsberg Volcano Express, Vex) operate. Route VB-90 runs from Stockheim station via Gedern, Grebenhain, Herbstein and Lauterbach. Route VB-94 runs from Büdingen via Stockheim and Gedern to Hoherodskopf.
