= Spießbach (Nidder) =

River in Germany

Location
- Country: Germany
- State: Hesse

Physical characteristics
- Mouth
  - location: Nidder
  - coordinates: 50°24′18″N 9°08′25″E

Basin features
- Progression: Nidder→ Nidda→ Main→ Rhine→ North Sea

Spießbach is a river of Hesse, Germany. It flows into the Nidder near Hirzenhain.

== See also ==
- List of rivers of Hesse
