= Karben =

- Town
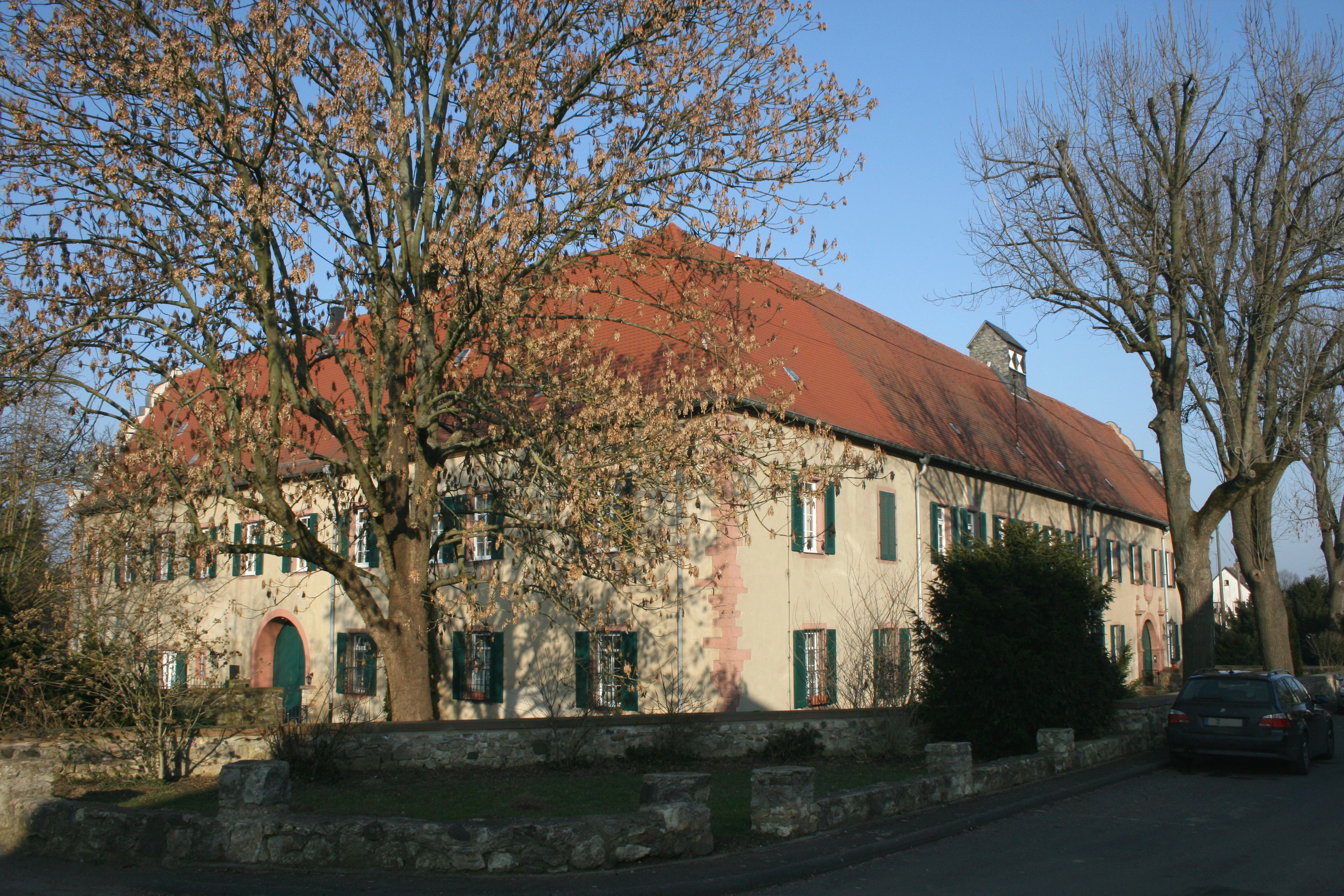
- Teutonic Order castle in Kloppenheim

- Coat of arms

- Location of Karben within Wetteraukreis district
- Interactive map of Karben
- Location within Germany Location within Hesse
- Coordinates: 50°13′56″N 8°46′5″E
- Country: Germany
- State: Hesse
- Admin. region: Darmstadt
- District: Wetteraukreis
- Subdivisions: 7 districts

Government
  - Mayor (2021–27): Guido Rahn (CDU)

Area
  - Total: 43.94 km^{2} (16.97 sq mi)
- Elevation: 110 m (360 ft)

Population (2025-12-31)
  - Total: 22,486
  - Density: 511.7/km^{2} (1,325/sq mi)
- Time zone: UTC+01:00 (CET)
  - Summer (DST): UTC+02:00 (CEST)
- Postal codes: 61184
- Dialling codes: 06039; 06034 (Burg-Gräfenrode)
- Vehicle registration: FB, BÜD
- Website: www.karben.de

Karben (German pronunciation: [ˈkaʁbn̩]) is a town in the Wetteraukreis, in Hessen, Germany. It is situated on the banks of the river Nidda in the Rhein-Main-Gebiet (Rhine-Main area), approximately 18 kilometres (11 miles) north of Frankfurt.

== Division of the town ==
Karben as a unified town was founded in 1970, comprising some smaller villages (Klein-Karben, Gross-Karben, Okarben, Kloppenheim, Rendel, Burg-Gräfenrode, and Petterweil).

== Infrastructure ==
Karben has two railway stations (Groß Karben and Okarben) on the Main–Weser Railway and is served by line S6 of the Rhine-Main S-Bahn. It has access to the A 661 autobahn and federal highway B3. The town hall is located in a newer district of Gross-Karben, as is a public swimming pool. The industrial district west of Gross- and Klein-Karben hosts several companies of national and international stature.

== History ==
The village of Okarben was once location of a Roman military castellum, forming a part of the limes, the Roman imperial border defence network and Karben’s mineral springs have been used by the Romans some 2000 years ago. Rendel, Karben’s oldest borough, was mentioned first in 774 in a deed of donation to the monastery of Lorch. Kloppenheim once belonged to an installation of the “Deutschen Orden” (Teutonic Knights Order), who maintained a small palace there. Gross-Karben hosts two more manors which were inhabited by local landlords. The “Degenfeld’sche Schloss” contains today Karben’s Museum on agriculture and local history. Gross-Karben, Klein-Karben, Okarben, Burg-Graefenrode and Rendel still have churches dating back from the Baroque period. Okarben experienced a face-change in the 19th century, when it started hosting workers for the newly established Main-Weser Railroad between Frankfurt and Kassel. The city has transformed itself from a bundle of independent villages living mostly of farming the rich soils of the Wetterau to a slowly integrating city providing housing for a growing population of commuters and space for several small and mid-sized enterprises, while maintaining much of its original rural charm.

== Twin towns – sister cities ==
Karben is twinned with:

- Ramonville-Saint-Agne, France (1974)
- Saint-Égrève, France (1974)
- Luisenthal, Germany (1992)
- Krnov, Czech Republic (1993)
