= Nidderau =

- Town
- Coat of arms

- Location of Nidderau within Main-Kinzig-Kreis district
- Interactive map of Nidderau
- Location within Germany Location within Hesse
- Coordinates: 50°15′N 8°54′E
- Country: Germany
- State: Hesse
- Admin. region: Darmstadt
- District: Main-Kinzig-Kreis

Government
  - Mayor (2020–26): Andreas Bär (SPD)

Area
  - Total: 46.73 km^{2} (18.04 sq mi)
- Elevation: 125 m (410 ft)

Population (2025-12-31)
  - Total: 20,131
  - Density: 430.8/km^{2} (1,116/sq mi)
- Time zone: UTC+01:00 (CET)
  - Summer (DST): UTC+02:00 (CEST)
- Postal codes: 61130
- Dialling codes: 06187
- Vehicle registration: MKK
- Website: www.nidderau.de

Nidderau (German: [ˈnɪdɐʔaʊ], lit. 'Nidder meadow') is a town in the Main-Kinzig district, in Hesse, Germany. It is situated approximately 12 km north of Hanau, and 20 km northeast of Frankfurt. Nidderau was created in the merger of the municipality of Heldenbergen with the town of Windecken on January 1, 1970. Eichen and Erbstadt joined Nidderau on January 1, 1972 and Ostheim merged with Nidderau in July 1974.

== Gallery ==
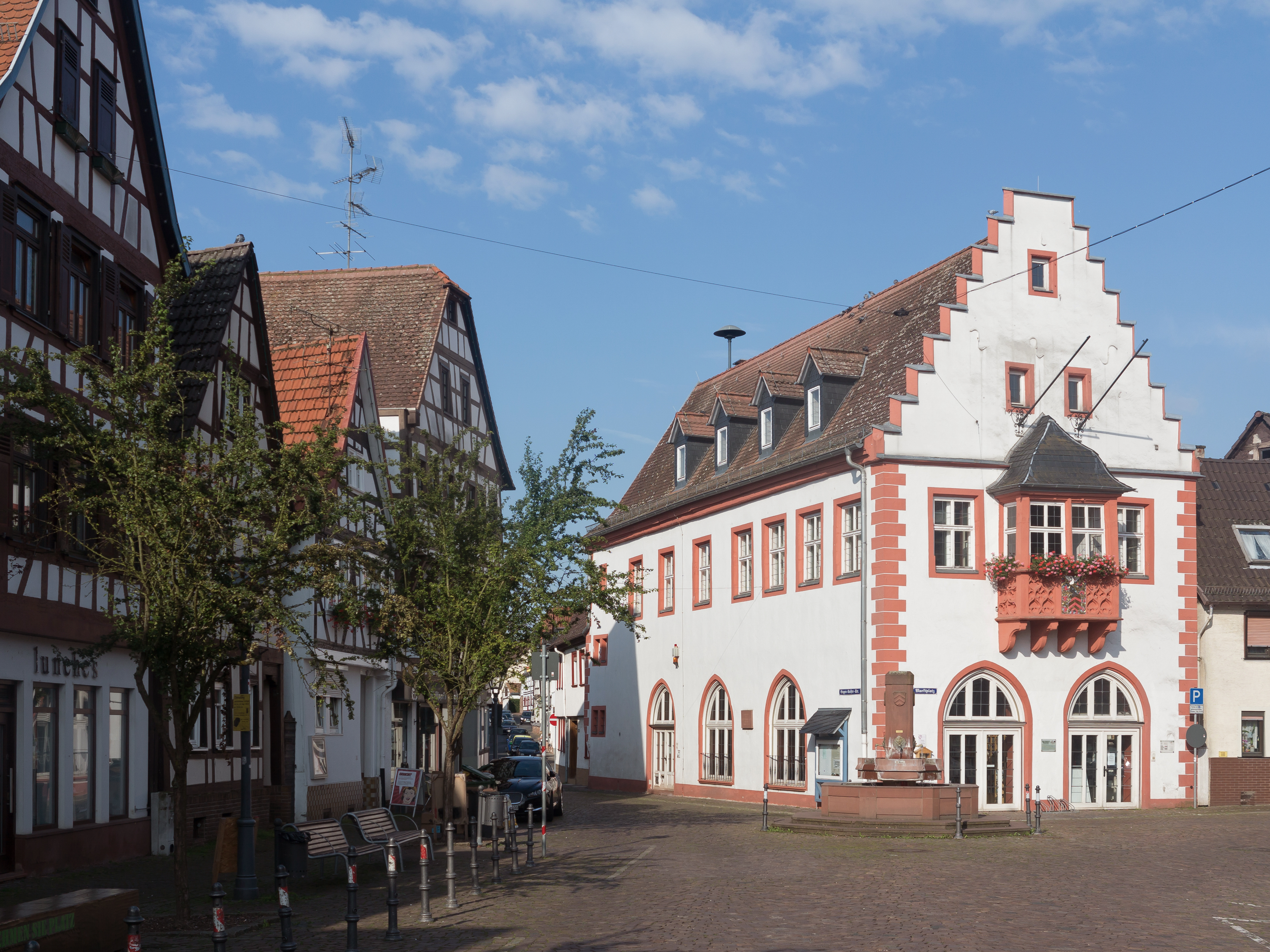
Townhall Windecken

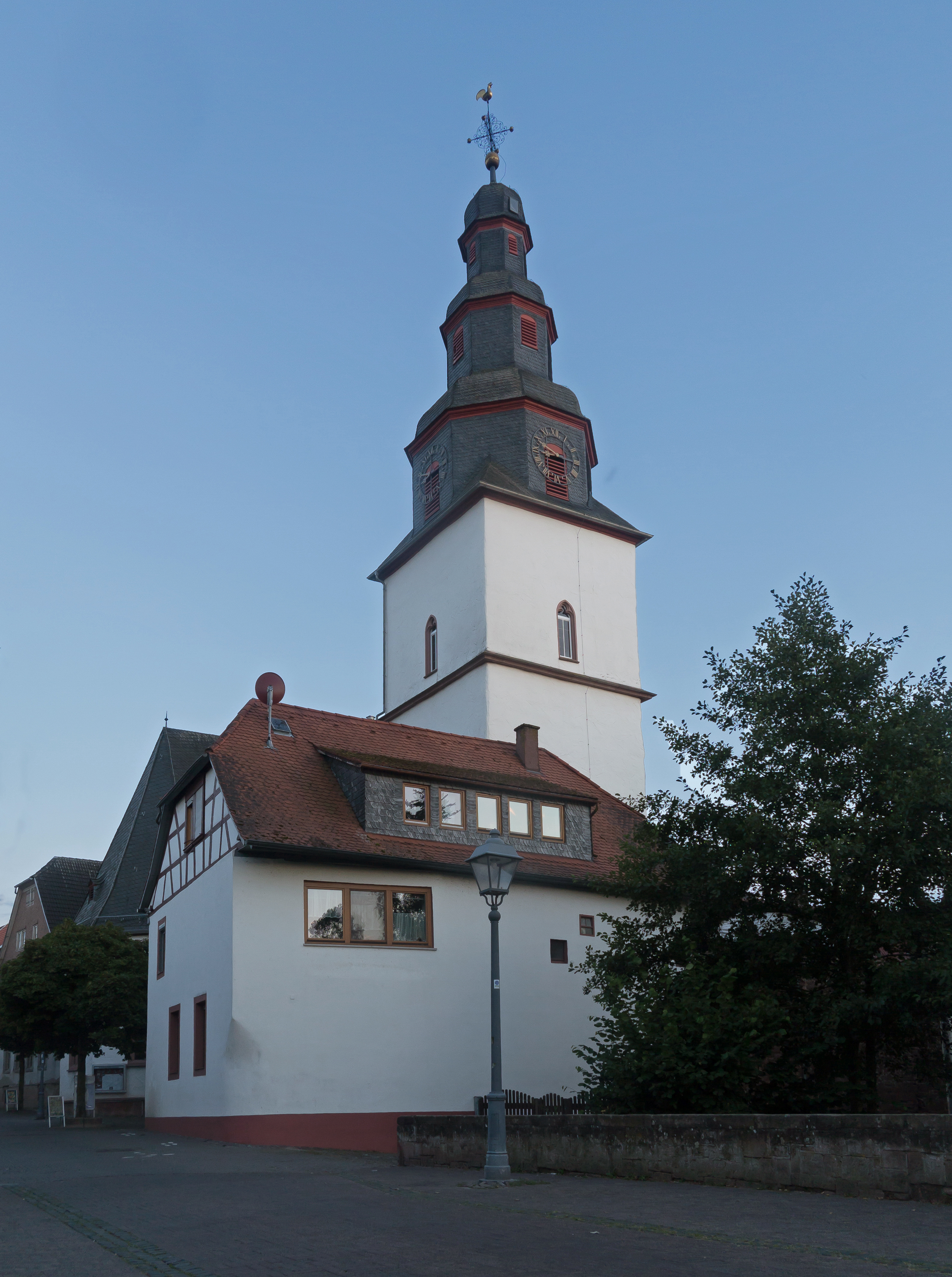
Church Stiftskirche Windecken

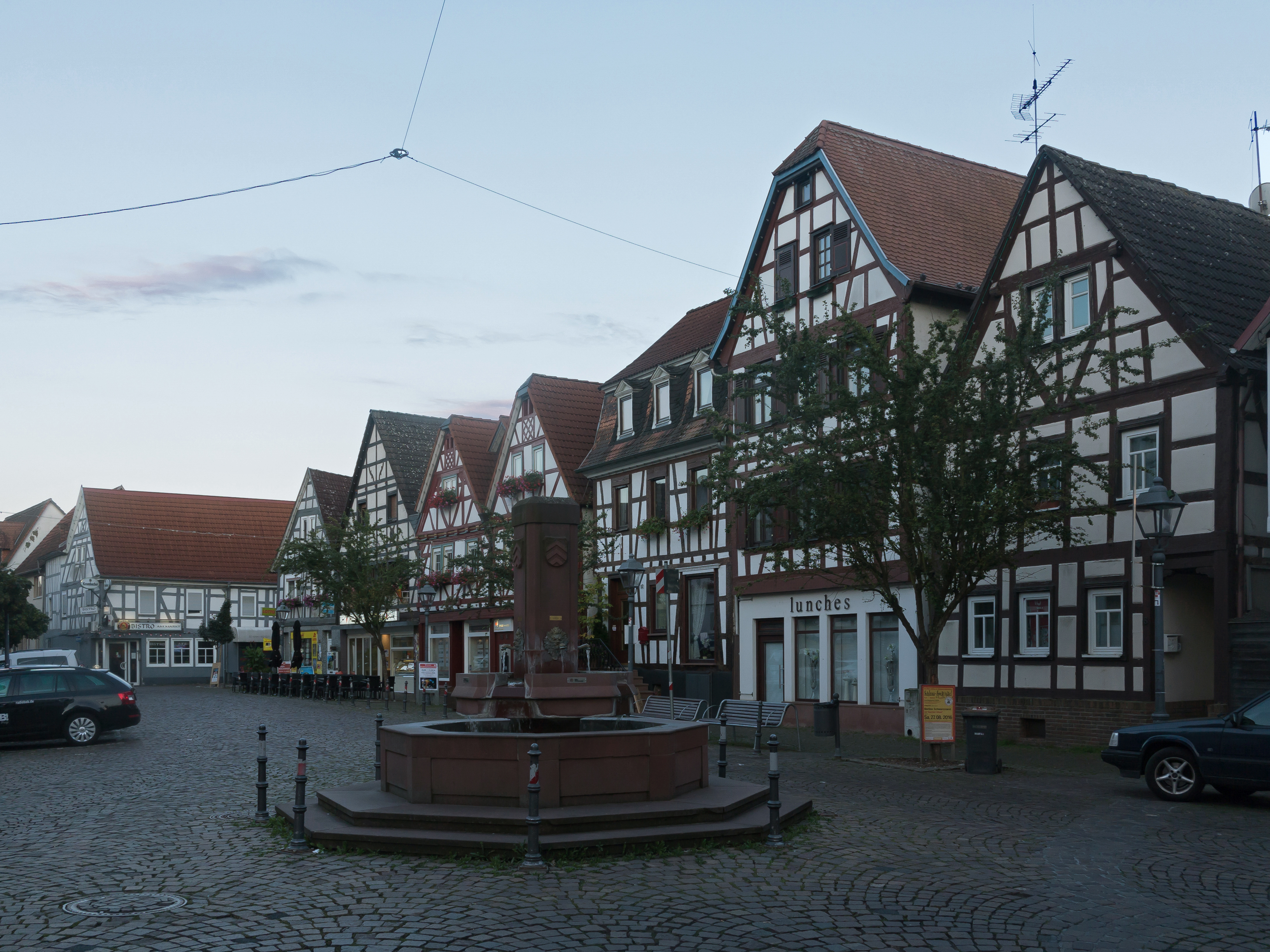
View of marketplace

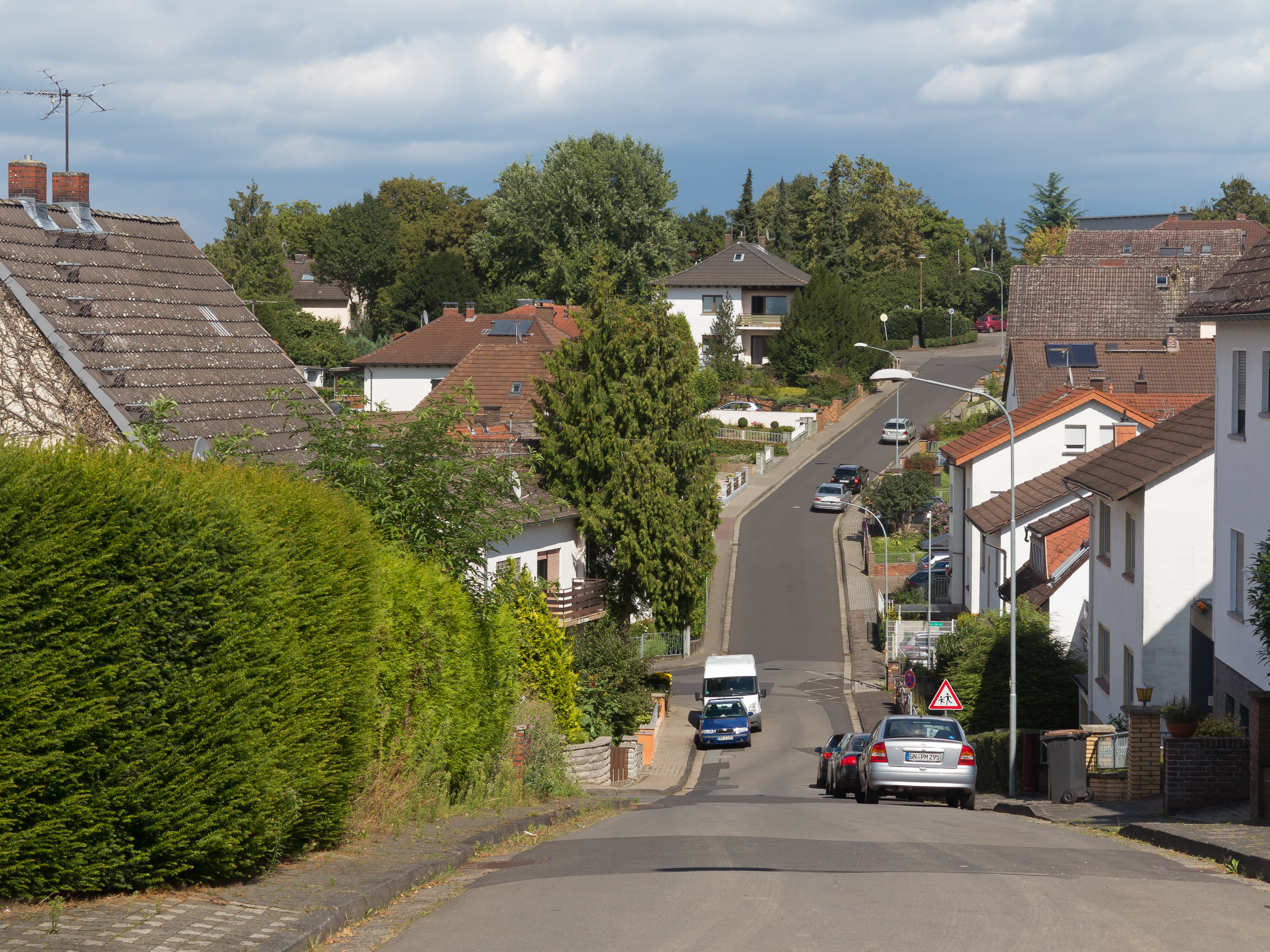
View of Pestalozzi-Strasse

== Known personalities ==
- Wilhelm Adam (1893-1978), politician and general
- Rodolphe Lindt (1855-1909), chocolate manufacturer
- Lassa Oppenheim (1858-1919), German jurist
