= Nidder =

River in Germany

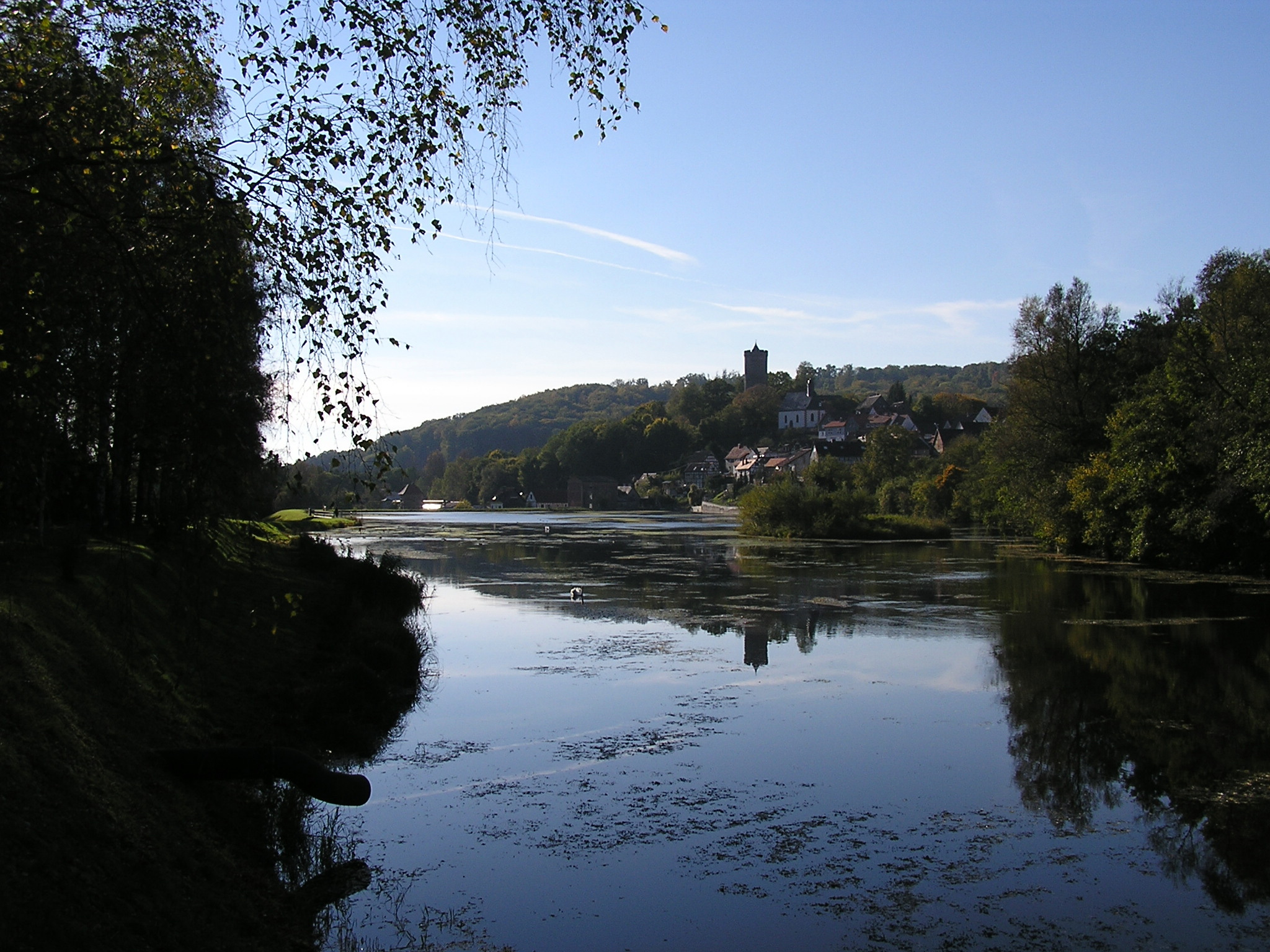
- The Nidder at Ortenberg

Location
- Country: Germany
- State: Hesse

Physical characteristics
- Mouth
  - location: Nidda
  - coordinates: 50°11′47″N 8°46′33″E
- Length: 68.6 km (42.6 mi)
- Basin size: 435 km^{2} (168 sq mi)

Basin features
- Progression: Nidda→ Main→ Rhine→ North Sea
- Tributaries
  - left: Spießbach, Merkenfritzerbach, Bleichenbach, Seemenbach
  - right: Hillersbach, Krebsbach, Erlenbach

The Nidder (German pronunciation: [ˈnɪdɐ]) is a 69 km-long (43 mi) river in Hesse, Germany, and part of the Main-Rhine system.

From its source at Herchenhainer Höhe it flows down to Bad Vilbel where it meets with the Nidda. The Bonifatiusweg, the route taken to bring the body of Saint Boniface from Mainz to Fulda, runs along the right (north) bank of the river.
