= Holzbach (disambiguation) =

Holzbach may refer to:

- Holzbach, a municipality in the Rhein-Hunsrück-Kreis in Rhineland-Palatinate, Germany

Rivers of Baden-Württemberg, Germany

- Holzbach (Soppenbach), left tributary of the Soppenbach

Rivers of Hesse, Germany

- Holzbach (Diemel), left tributary of the Diemel
- Holzbach (Elbbach, Hadamar), left tributary of the Elbbach in Hadamar
- Holzbach (Elbbach, Gemünden), left tributary of the Elbbach in Gemmünden
- Holzbach (Schweinfe), right tributary of the Schweinfe
- Holzbach (Usa), right tributary of the Usa

Rivers of North Rhine-Westphalia, Germany

- Holzbach (Ahse), left tributary of the Ahse
- Holzbach (Auelsbach), left tributary of the Auelsbach
- Holzbach (Belgenbach), left tributary of the Belgenbach
- Holzbach (Dickopsbach), right tributary of the Dickopsbach
- Holzbach (Ems), left tributary of the Ems
- Holzbach (Emscher), right tributary of the Emscher
- Holzbach (Erft), right tributary of the Erft
- Holzbach (Finkenbach), right tributary of the Finkenbach

Rivers of Saarland, Germany

- Holzbach (Hochwald), in the Schwarzwälder Hochwald
