= Holzbach (Finkenbach) =

River in Germany

Location
- Country: Germany
- States: North Rhine-Westphalia

Physical characteristics
- Mouth
  - location: Finkenbach
  - coordinates: 52.0364°N 8.5986°E

Basin features
- Progression: Finkenbach→ Lutter→ Aa→ Werre→ Weser→ North Sea

Holzbach (German pronunciation: [ˈhɔlt͡sˌbax]) is a small river of North Rhine-Westphalia, Germany. It is 1.8 km long and a right tributary of the Finkenbach.

== See also ==
- List of rivers of North Rhine-Westphalia
