= Elbbach =

River in Germany

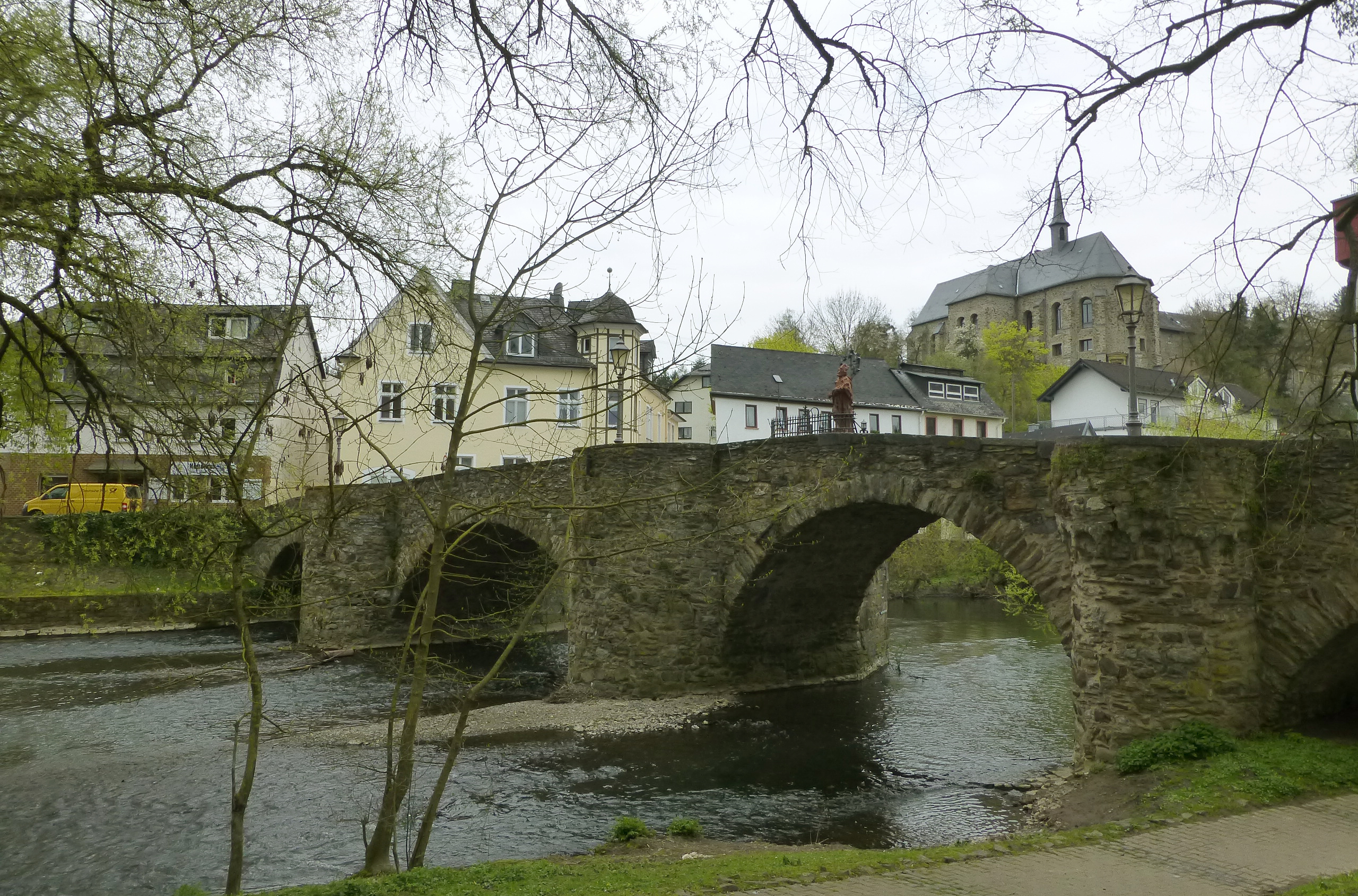
- Flowing under stone bridge at Hadamar

Location
- Country: Germany
- States: Rhineland-Palatinate and Hesse

Physical characteristics
- Mouth
  - location: Lahn
  - coordinates: 50.3977°N 8.0494°E
- Length: 38.1 km (23.7 mi)
- Basin size: 323.6 km^{2} (124.9 sq mi)

Basin features
- Progression: Lahn→ Rhine→ North Sea

Elbbach is a river in Germany, about 38.1 kilometres (23.7 mi) long. It is a right tributary of the Lahn which in turn is a right tributary of the Rhine. The Elbbach starts near Westerburg in the state of Rhineland-Palatinate, and flows into the Lahn near Limburg an der Lahn in the state of Hesse. The drainage basin of this river has an area of 323.67 square kilometres (124.97 sq mi).

== History ==
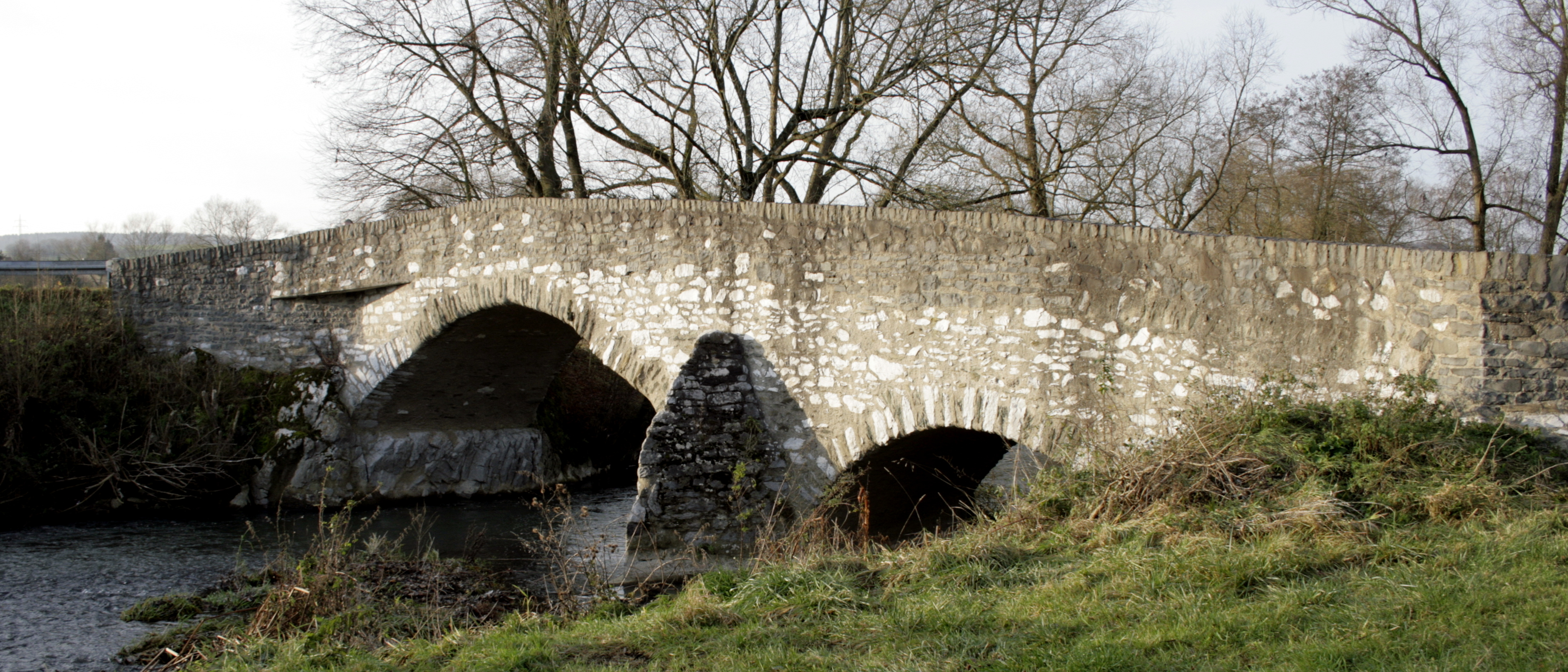
Saint Wendilin Bridge

In the nineteenth century, many mills used the water power of the Elbbach. They included grain mills, an ironworks in Berzhahn and also an oil mill in Niederhadamar.

In the twentieth century, the economic importance of this river greatly diminished. However, many micro hydro plants are now running on the Elbbach, especially around Hadamar. Some of them are at the sites of the old mills.

There are many bridges across this river, some of them extremely old. These include the Saint Wendilin Bridge in Niederhadamar, built in the 12th century, which is one of Germany’s medieval bridges and may be the oldest in the state of Hesse.

=== Etymology ===
The first part of the name “Elbbach” has an etymology like that of the Elbe, a major river in Central Europe whose name derived from the Latin Albis meaning “river”. And, the German word for “stream” is “bach”, a common suffix for German rivers.

== Route ==
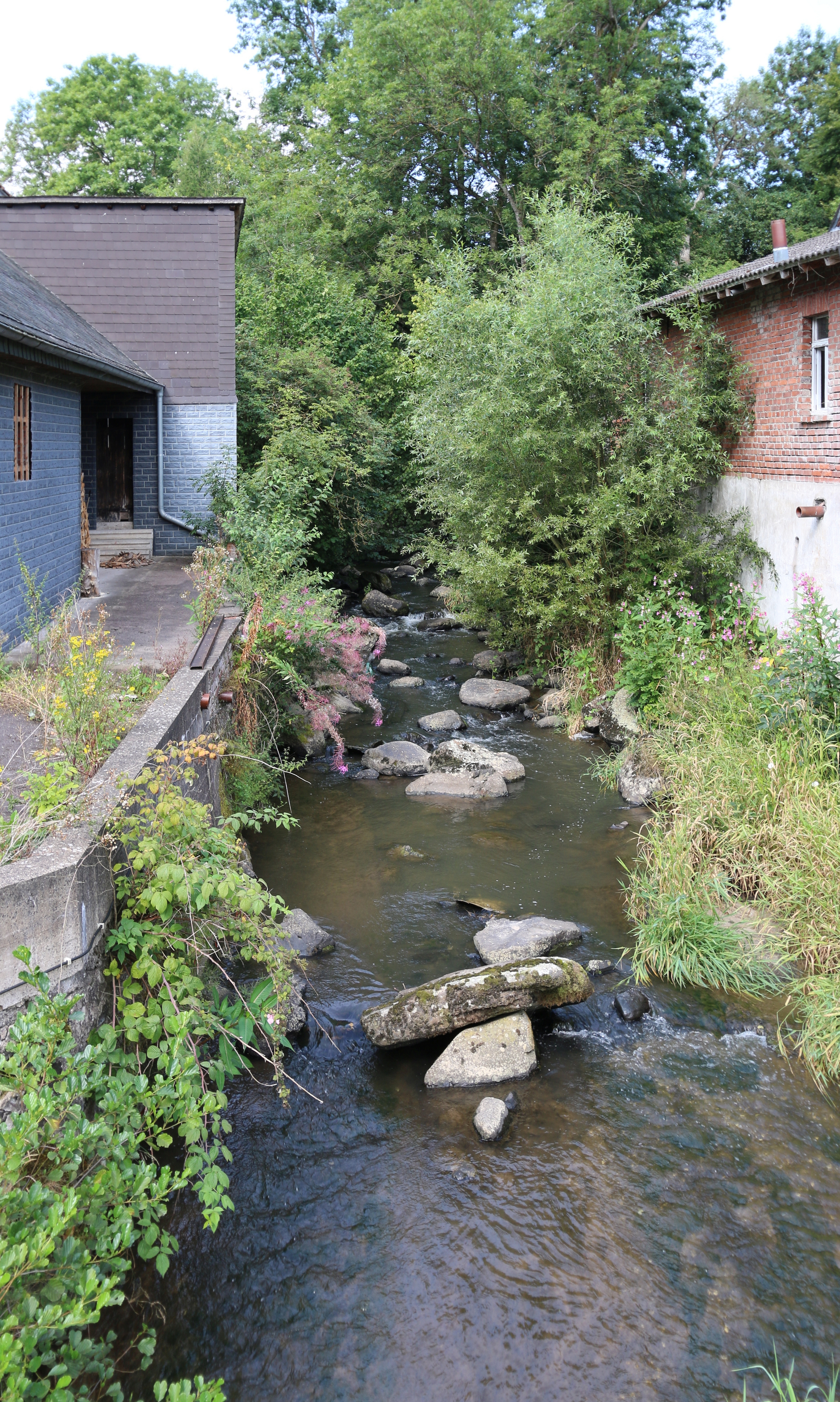
Weaving its way through Willmenrod

The Elbbach arises in the Rhineland-Palatinate part of the Westerwald, a few miles northwest of Westerburg, from the convergence of several streams north of Ailertchen. From there, it flows south to Kaden, east past Guckheim, through Willmenrod and then to Langendernbach in Hesse. Continuing south, the Elbbach reaches Elbtal (named after the river) and then Hadamar. Then this river flows further south at Staffel, which is a district of Limburg an der Lahn. On average, this river supplies about four cubic meters per second (4 m³/s) into the Lahn.

=== Nature preserves ===
In the latter part of its route, through the state of Hesse, the Elbbach flows through the nature reserve "Elbbachtal". This protected area follows the course of the river over approximately 10 kilometres (6.2 mi) from the state border to the city of Hadamar. The boundary of the reserve is usually close to the river, which means that the reserve covers only 84 hectares (210 acres) despite its long distance. The official short description and justification of this protected area is: "Near-natural watercourses with brook-riparian riparian forests, high-altitude meadows, wet meadows, freshwater meadows, reedbeds and floodplains. Vegetation valuable from both botanical and faunistic point of view, habitat of numerous rare and endangered species of flora and fauna, of particular importance for running waters, locally significant bird breeding area."

Further along this river’s course is the nature reserve "Kalksteinbruch bei Hadamar" comprising 9.8 hectares (24 acres), and the area "Elbbachaue east of Elz" comprising 49.1 hectares (121 acres). The latter area consists of two sub-areas of wet meadow, which is particularly important because of the occurrence of the dark and the light-colored butterfly called the Scarce large blue.

== List of tributaries ==
The tributaries of the Elbbach are as follows (L = left side, R = right side), with each river’s length in kilometers (and miles):

- Hinterkirchenerbach; R; 1.7 kilometres (1.1 mi)
- Rothenbach; R; 2.7 kilometres (1.7 mi)
- Kuhbach; R; 1.3 kilometres (0.81 mi)
- Dernbach; L; 3.1 kilometres (1.9 mi)
- Kälberbach; R; 4.9 kilometres (3.0 mi)
- Otterbach; L; 2.4 kilometres (1.5 mi)
- Schafbach; L; 13.6 kilometres (8.5 mi)
- Holzbach (in Gemünden); L; 12.9 kilometres (8.0 mi)
- Langendernbach (Dernbach); L; 4.9 kilometres (3.0 mi)
- Mühlbach; L; 3.7 kilometres (2.3 mi)
- Lasterbach (Steinbach); L; 19.0 kilometres (11.8 mi)
- Grundbach (Frickhofener Bach); R; 5.6 kilometres (3.5 mi)
- Oderbach (Wertsbach); L; 3.0 kilometres (1.9 mi)
- Salzbach; R; 9.3 kilometres (5.8 mi)
- Kumpgraben; L; 0.6 kilometres (0.37 mi)
- Lohbach; R; 4.4 kilometres (2.7 mi)
- Holzbach (in Hadamar); L; 6.1 kilometres (3.8 mi)
- Faulbach; L; 3.3 kilometres (2.1 mi)
- Weiersbach; R; 3.2 kilometres (2.0 mi)
- Dorfbach (Tränkbach); R; 2.5 kilometres (1.6 mi)
- Ahlbach (Bach vom Urselthaler Hof); L; 3.8 kilometres (2.4 mi)
- Offheimer Bach; L; 1.3 kilometres (0.81 mi)
- Erbach; R; 11.8 kilometres (7.3 mi)
- Wambach (Dillbach); R; 3.9 kilometres (2.4 mi)

== See also ==
- List of rivers of Hesse
- List of rivers of Rhineland-Palatinate
