= Sudbrackbach =

River in Germany

Location
- Country: Germany
- State: North Rhine-Westphalia

Physical characteristics
- Mouth
  - location: Schloßhofbach
  - coordinates: 52.0544°N 8.5321°E

Basin features
- Progression: Schloßhofbach→ Aa→ Werre→ Weser→ North Sea

Sudbrackbach or Sudbrockbach is a small river of North Rhine-Westphalia, Germany. It flows into the Schloßhofbach in Bielefeld.

== See also ==
- List of rivers of North Rhine-Westphalia
