= Klosterbach (Schwarzbach) =

River in North Rhine-Westphalia, Germany

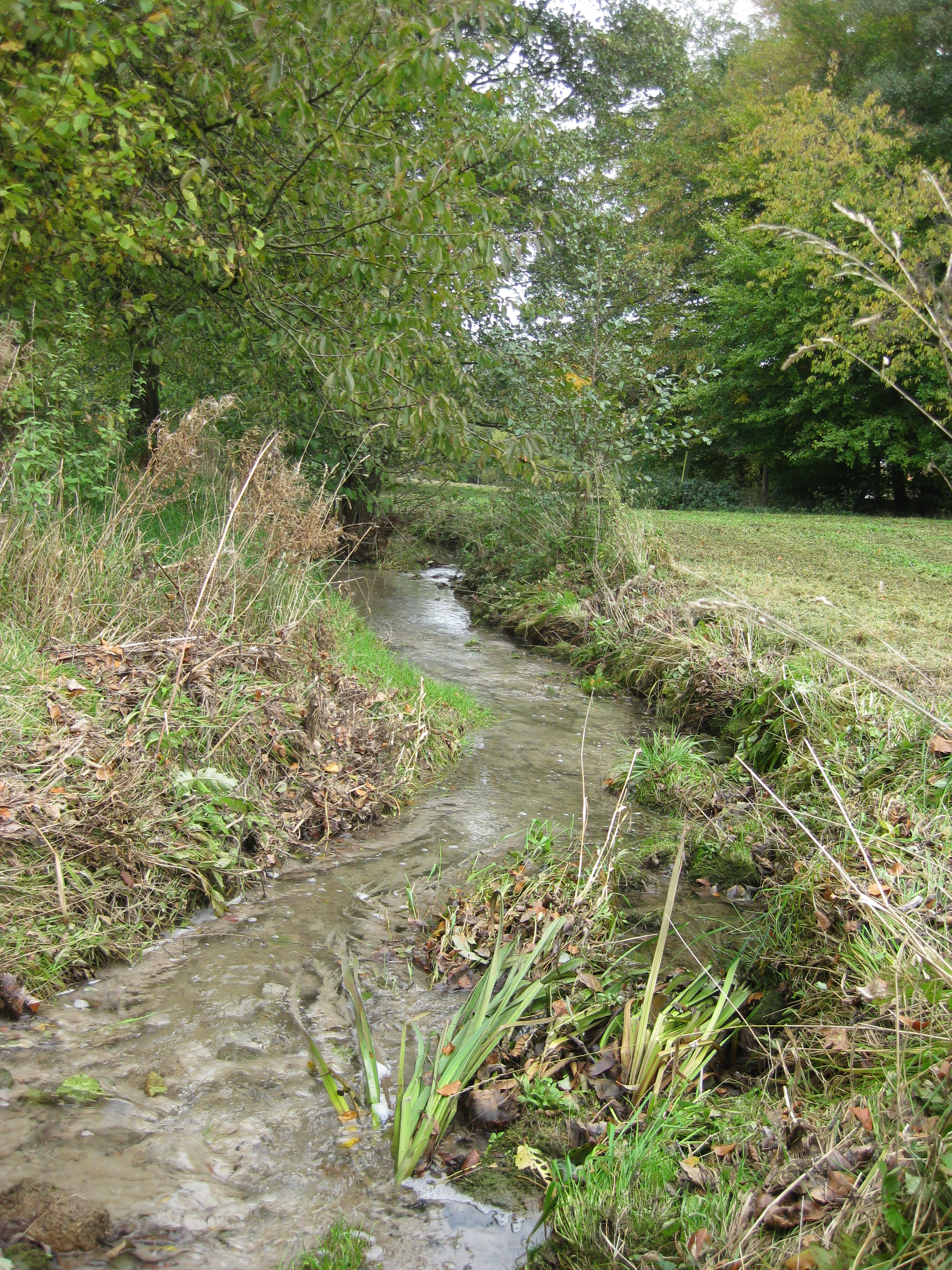

Location
- Country: Germany
- States: North Rhine-Westphalia

Physical characteristics
- Mouth
  - location: Schwarzbach
  - coordinates: 52.0684°N 8.4784°E

Basin features
- Progression: Schwarzbach→ Aa→ Werre→ Weser→ North Sea

Klosterbach is a small river of North Rhine-Westphalia, Germany. It is 5.7 km long and is a right tributary of the Schwarzbach. It is one of four streams in North Rhine-Westphalia named Klosterbach.

== See also ==
- List of rivers of North Rhine-Westphalia
