= Lambach (Eickumer Mühlenbach) =

River in Germany

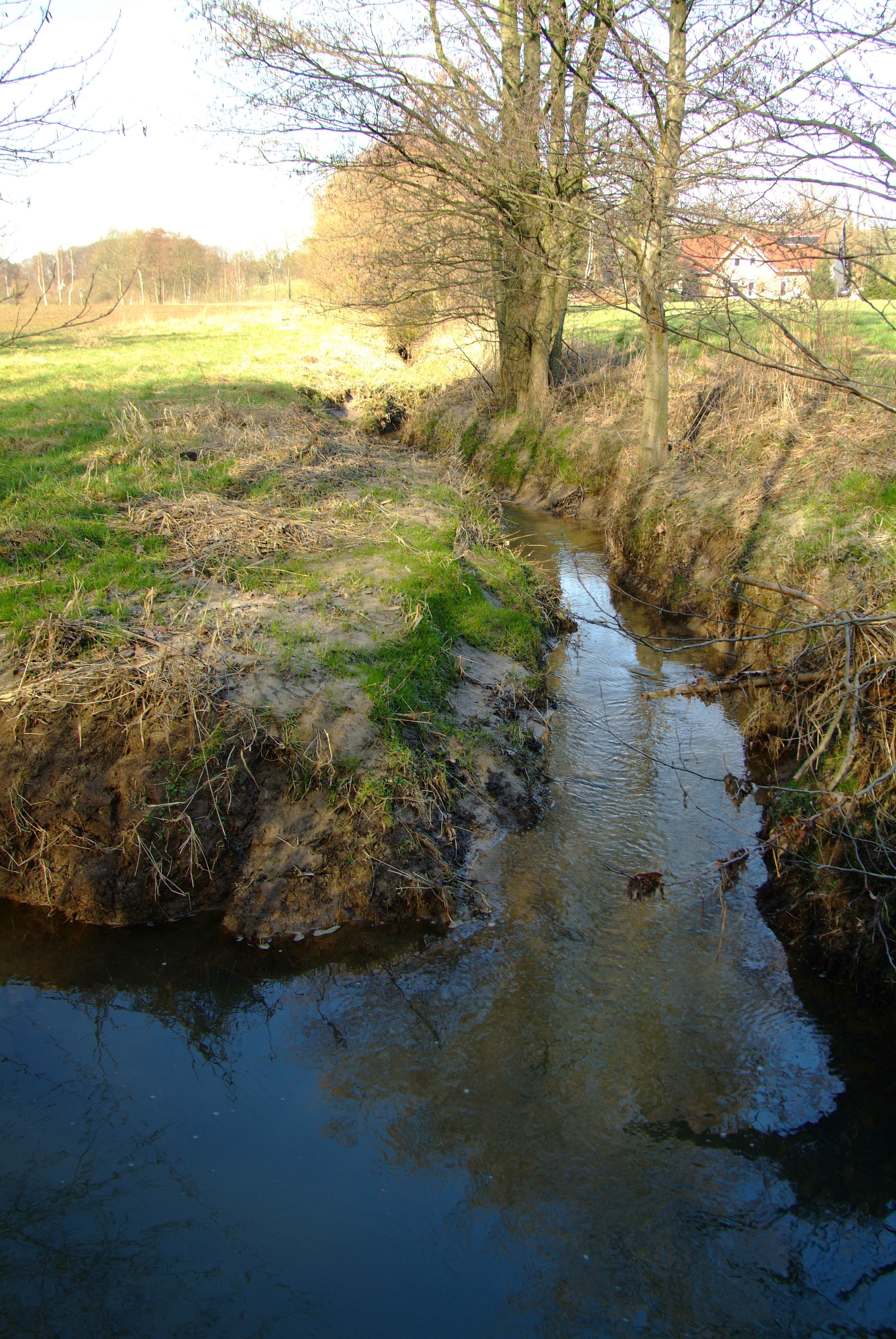

Location
- Country: Germany
- States: North Rhine-Westphalia

Physical characteristics
- Mouth
  - location: Eickumer Mühlenbach
  - coordinates: 52.1139°N 8.6233°E

Basin features
- Progression: Eickumer Mühlenbach→ Aa→ Werre→ Weser→ North Sea

Lambach is a small river of North Rhine-Westphalia, Germany. It is 2.6 km long and a left tributary of the Eickumer Mühlenbach. It is one of three streams in North Rhine-Westphalia named Lambach.

== See also ==
- List of rivers of North Rhine-Westphalia
