= Asbeke =

River in Germany

Location
- Country: Germany
- State: North Rhine-Westphalia

Physical characteristics
- Mouth
  - location: Eickumer Mühlenbach
  - coordinates: 52.1172°N 8.6061°E
- Length: 2.37 km (1.47 mi)

Basin features
- Progression: Eickumer Mühlenbach→ Aa→ Werre→ Weser→ North Sea

Asbeke is a river of North Rhine-Westphalia, Germany. It flows into the Eickumer Mühlenbach near Herford.

== See also ==
- List of rivers of North Rhine-Westphalia
