= Mühlenbach (Schwarzbach) =

River in Germany

Location
- Country: Germany
- State: North Rhine-Westphalia

Physical characteristics
- Mouth
  - location: Schwarzbach
  - coordinates: 52.0706°N 8.4585°E
- Length: 1.4 km (0.87 mi)

Basin features
- Progression: Schwarzbach→ Aa→ Werre→ Weser→ North Sea

Mühlenbach (German pronunciation: [ˈmyːlənbax]) is a small river of North Rhine-Westphalia, Germany. It is a right tributary of the Schwarzbach.

== See also ==
- List of rivers of North Rhine-Westphalia
