= Windwehe =

River in Germany

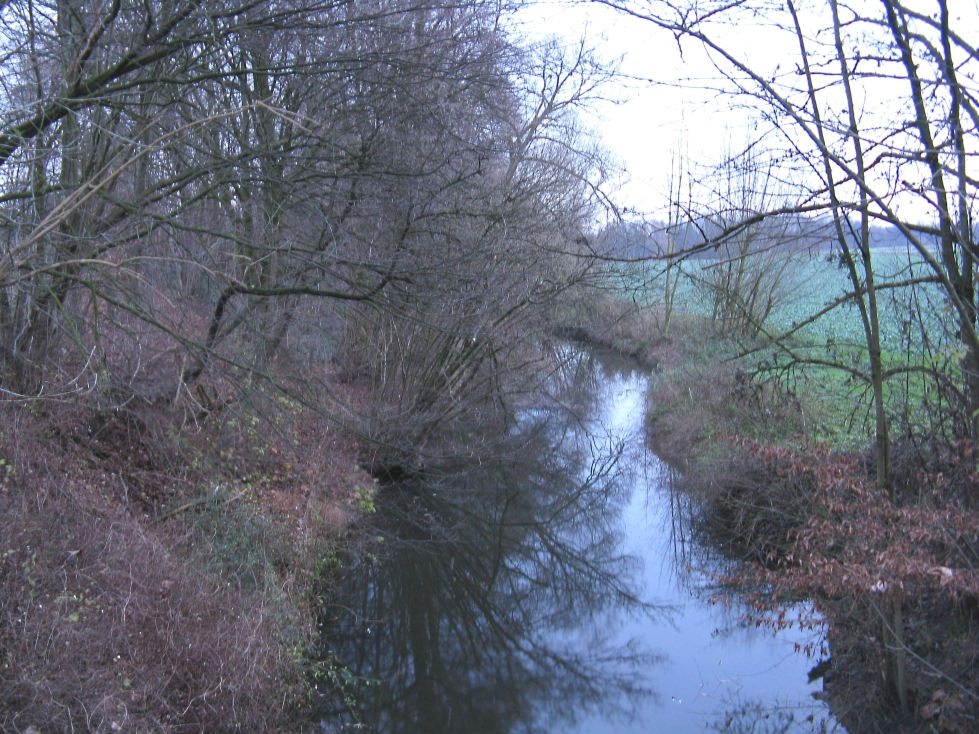

Location
- Country: Germany
- State: North Rhine-Westphalia

Physical characteristics
- Mouth
  - location: Lutter
  - coordinates: 52.0400°N 8.6137°E
- Length: 12.6 km (7.8 mi)

Basin features
- Progression: Lutter→ Aa→ Werre→ Weser→ North Sea

Windwehe is a river of North Rhine-Westphalia, Germany. It is a right tributary of the Lutter in Bielefeld-Heepen.

== See also ==
- List of rivers of North Rhine-Westphalia
