= Babenhausener Bach =

River in Germany

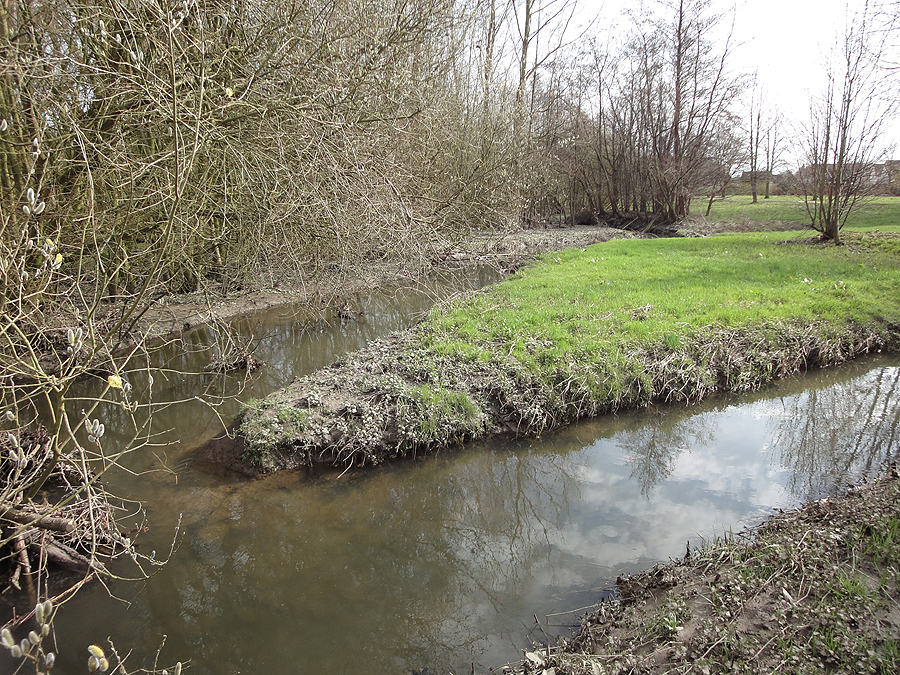

Location
- Country: Germany
- State: North Rhine-Westphalia

Physical characteristics
- Mouth
  - location: Schloßhofbach
  - coordinates: 52.0553°N 8.5311°E

Basin features
- Progression: Schloßhofbach→ Aa→ Werre→ Weser→ North Sea

Babenhausener Bach is a river of North Rhine-Westphalia, Germany. It is 4.8 km long and flows into the Schloßhofbach in Bielefeld.

== See also ==
- List of rivers of North Rhine-Westphalia
