= Finkenbach (Lutter) =

River in North Rhine-Westphalia, Germany

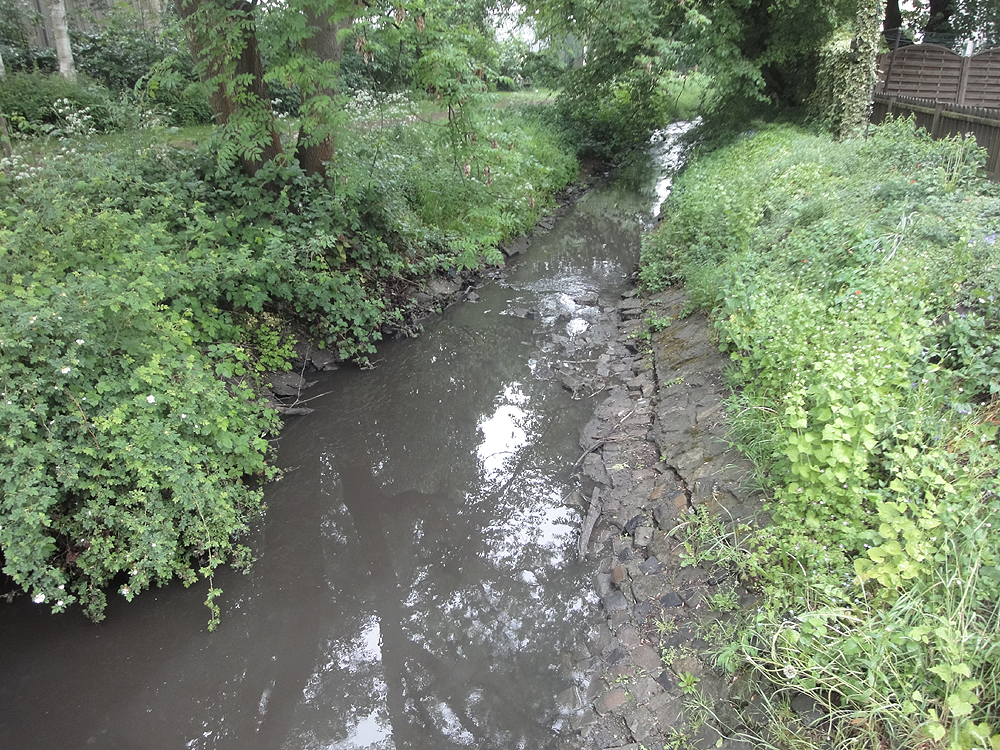

Location
- Country: Germany
- State: North Rhine-Westphalia

Physical characteristics
- Mouth
  - location: Lutter
  - coordinates: 52.0347°N 8.6024°E

Basin features
- Progression: Lutter→ Aa→ Werre→ Weser→ North Sea

Finkenbach (German pronunciation: [ˈfɪŋkn̩bax]) is a small river of North Rhine-Westphalia, Germany. It is a left tributary of the Lutter.

== See also ==
- List of rivers of North Rhine-Westphalia
