= Seifenbach =

Seifenbach may refer to:

- Seifenbach (Salzbach), a river of Hesse, Germany, tributary of the Salzbach
- Seifenbach (Schwarzwasser), a river of Hesse, Germany, tributary of the Schwarzwasser
