= Beckendorf =

Beckendorf may refer to:

- Benkendorf, a village in Saxony-Anhalt, Germany, sometimes spelled Beckendorf
- Beckendorf Lake, in Renville County, Minnesota
- Beckendorf-Neindorf, a town in Saxony-Anhalt, Germany
- Beckendorf River or Beckendorfer Mühlenbach, a river in North Rhine-Westphalia, Germany
- Bob and Elsa Beckendorf, gospel singing duo that inspired Songs of the Heart
- Charles Beckendorf, side character in Percy Jackson & the Olympians
- Heinie Beckendorf, American baseball player
