= Lasterbach =

River in Germany

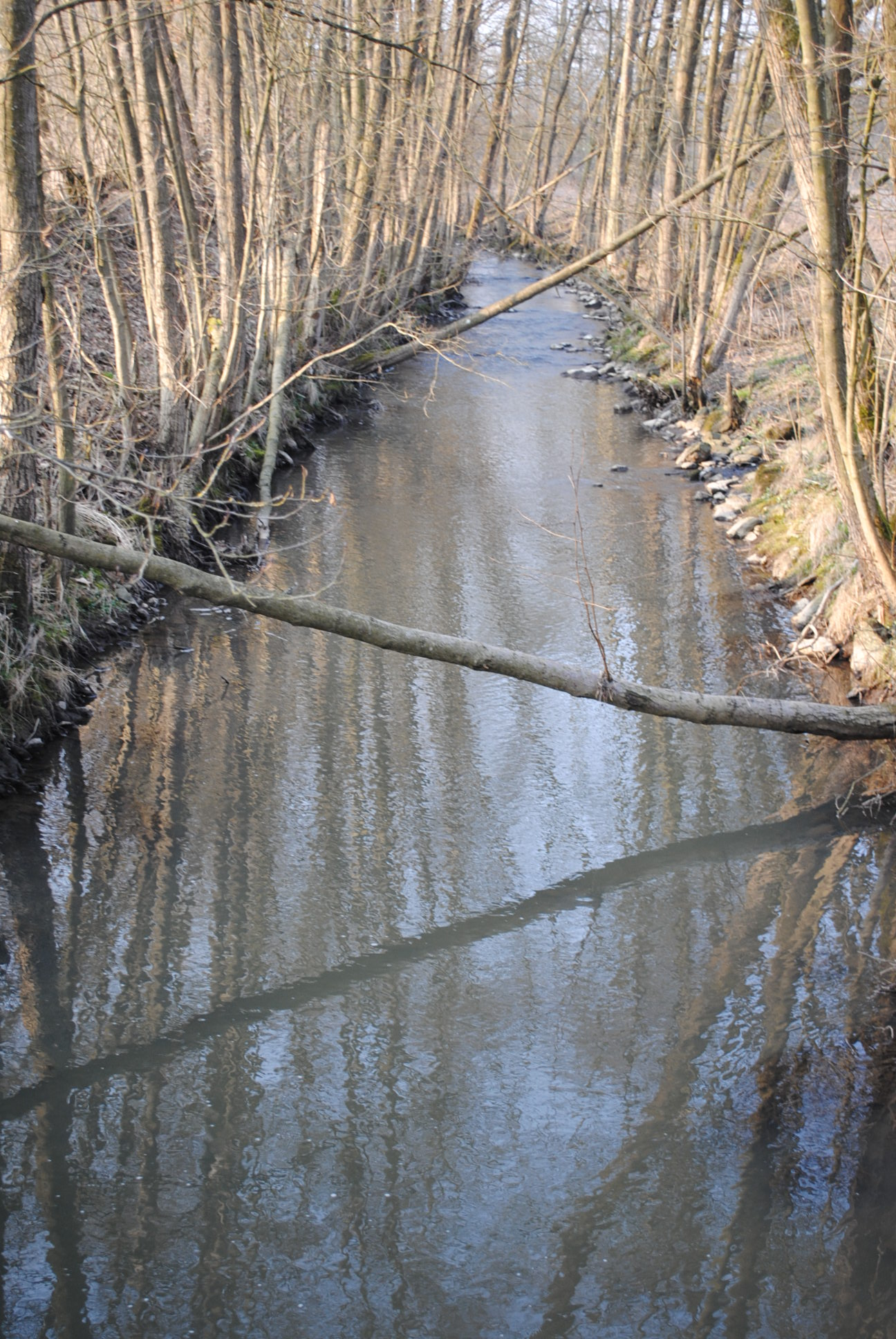
- The Lasterbach at Neunkirchen

Location
- Country: Germany
- States: Rhineland-Palatinate; Hesse

Physical characteristics
- Mouth
  - location: Elbbach
  - coordinates: 50.4981°N 8.0507°E
- Length: 19.3 km (12.0 mi)

Basin features
- Progression: Elbbach→ Lahn→ Rhine→ North Sea

Lasterbach is a river of Rhineland-Palatinate and Hesse, Germany. It flows into the Elbbach in Elbtal.

== See also ==
- List of rivers of Rhineland-Palatinate
- List of rivers of Hesse
