= Siebenbach (river) =

River in Germany

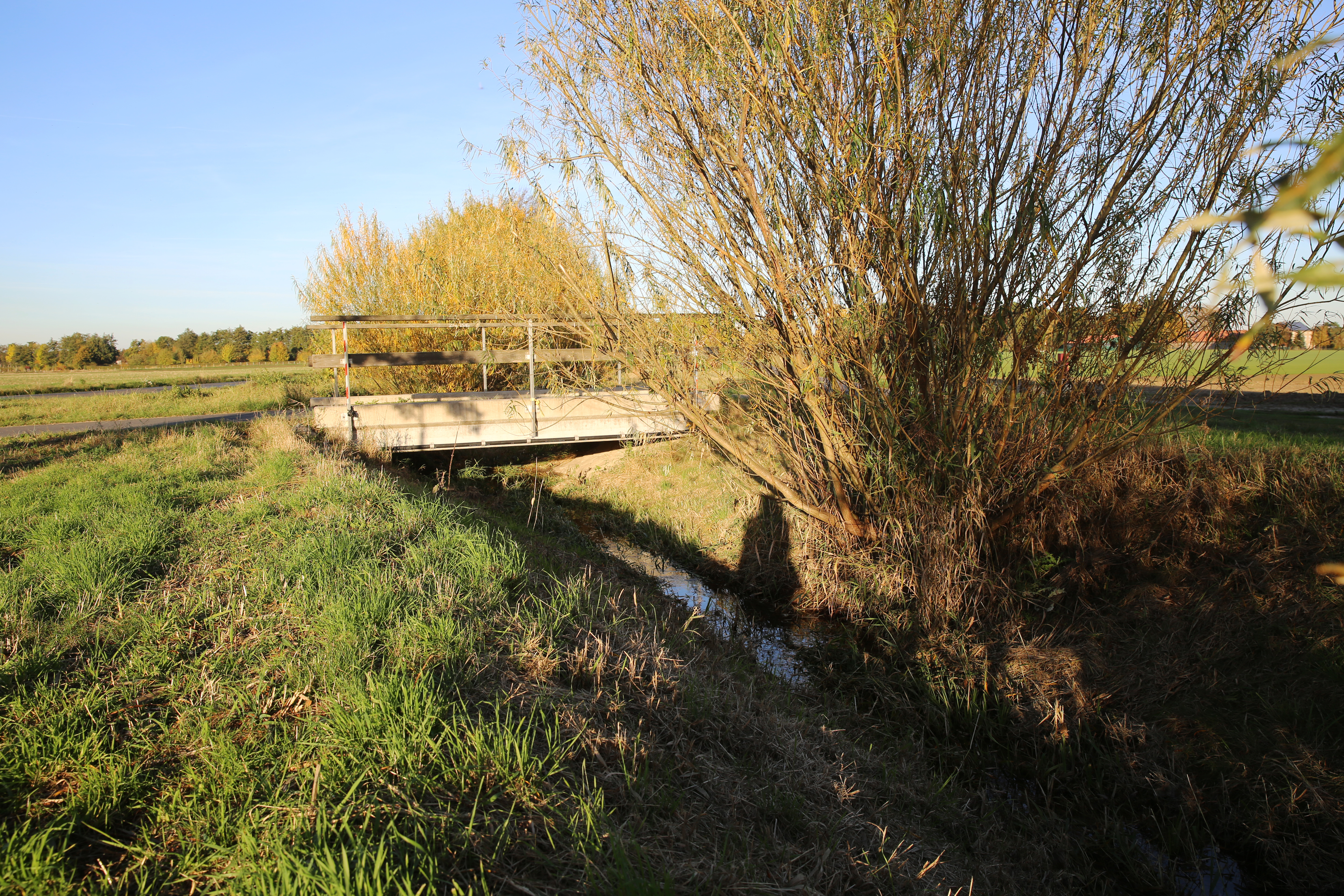

Location
- Country: Germany
- State: North Rhine-Westphalia

Physical characteristics
- Mouth
  - location: Mühlenbach
  - coordinates: 50.7915°N 6.9389°E
- Length: 3.1 km (1.9 mi)

Basin features
- Progression: Mühlenbach→ Dickopsbach→ Rhine→ North Sea

Siebenbach (German pronunciation: [ˈziːbn̩bax]) is a small river of North Rhine-Westphalia, Germany. It flows into the Mühlenbach near Bornheim-Sechtem.

== See also ==
- List of rivers of North Rhine-Westphalia
