= Grundbach =

Grundbach may refer to:

- Grundbach (Elbbach), a river of Hesse, Germany
- Grundbach (Jagst), a river of Baden-Württemberg, Germany
- Grundwasser, also called Grundbach, a river of Saxony, Germany
