= Kieselbach =

Kieselbach may refer to:

- Kieselbach (Dorndorfer Bach), a river of Hesse, Germany
- Kieselbach (Lichte), a tributary of the Lichte in Thuringia, Germany
