= Mühlbach (Elbbach) =

River in Germany

Location
- Country: Germany
- States: Hesse

Physical characteristics
- Mouth
  - location: Elbbach
  - coordinates: 50.5006°N 8.0515°E

Basin features
- Progression: Elbbach→ Lahn→ Rhine→ North Sea

Mühlbach is a small river of Hesse, Germany. It is a tributary of the Elbbach in Elbtal.

== See also ==
- List of rivers of Hesse
