= Langendernbach (Elbbach) =

River in Germany

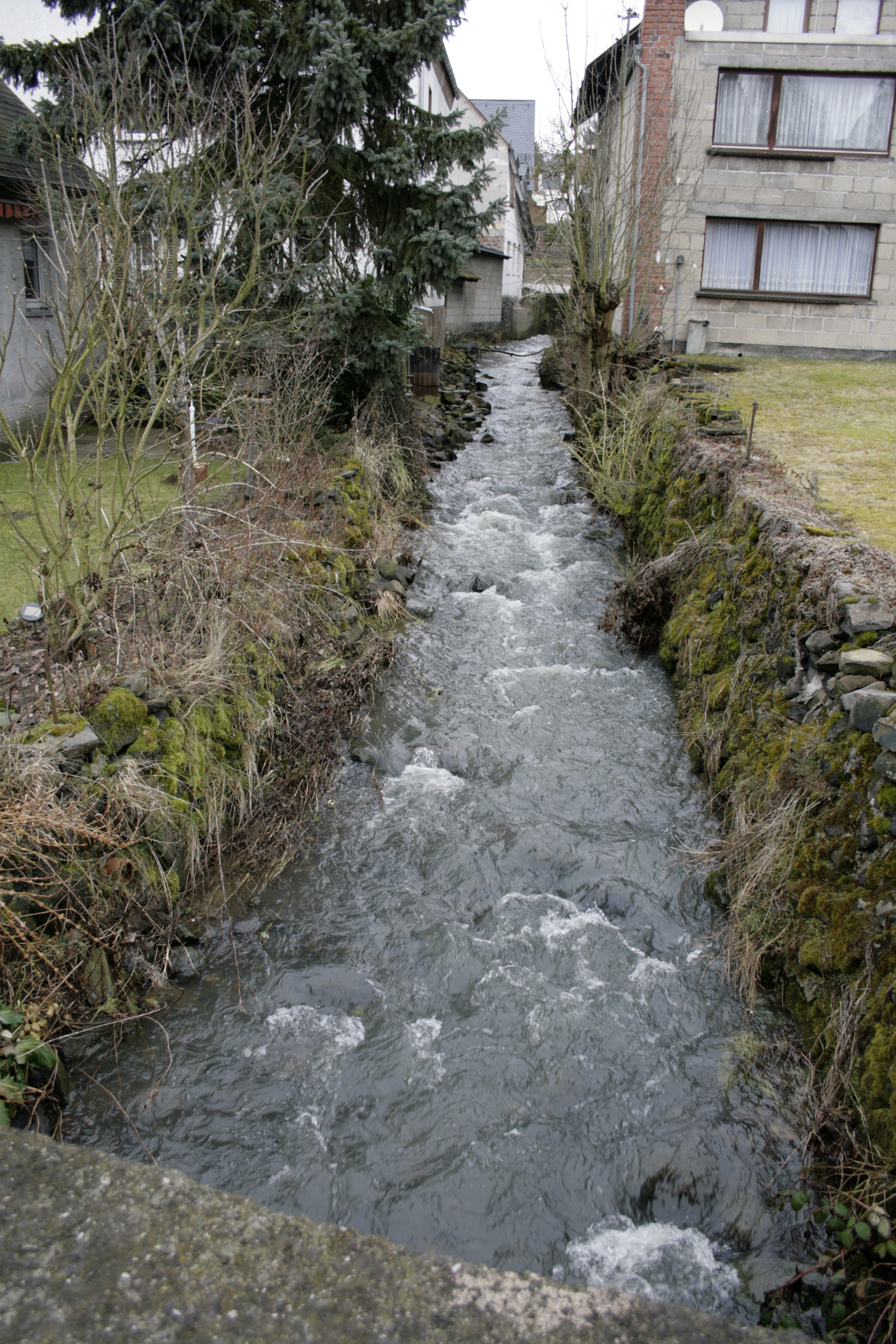

Location
- Country: Germany
- States: Rhineland-Palatinate; Hesse

Physical characteristics
- Mouth
  - location: Elbbach
  - coordinates: 50.5347°N 8.0417°E

Basin features
- Progression: Elbbach→ Lahn→ Rhine→ North Sea

Dernbach is a small river of Rhineland-Palatinate and Hesse, Germany. It flows into the Elbbach in the village Langendernbach.

== See also ==
- List of rivers of Hesse
- List of rivers of Rhineland-Palatinate
