= Dorndorfer Bach =

River in Germany

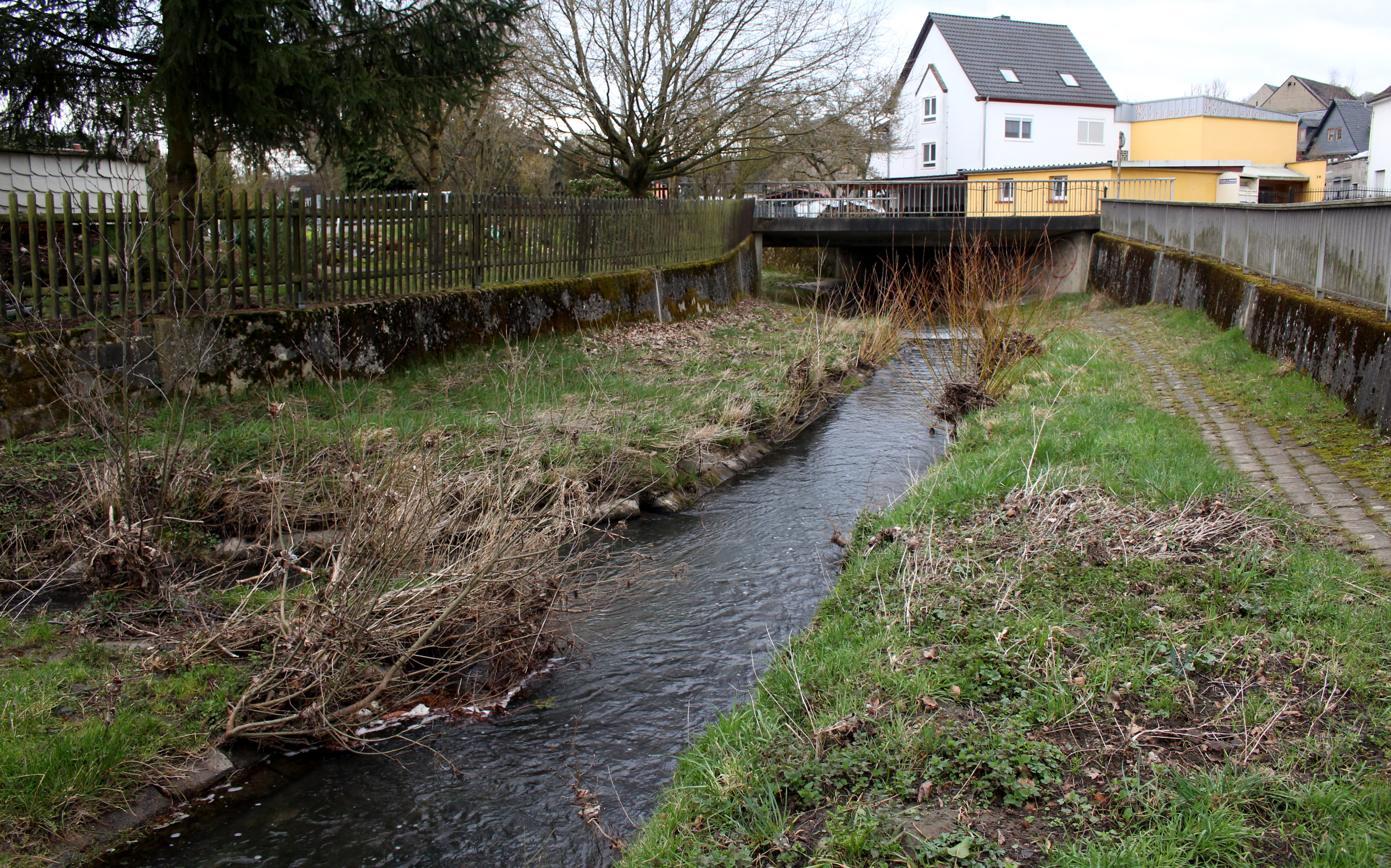

Location
- Country: Germany
- State: Hesse

Physical characteristics
- Mouth
  - location: Salzbach
  - coordinates: 50.4882°N 8.0126°E

Basin features
- Progression: Salzbach→ Elbbach→ Lahn→ Rhine→ North Sea
- Tributaries
  - left: Watzenbach

Dorndorfer Bach is a small river in Hesse, Germany. Upstream until its confluence with the Watzenbach, it is also known as Kieselbach. The Dorndorfer Bach eventually flows into the Salzbach in Thalheim.

== See also ==
- List of rivers of Hesse
