= Beckendorfer Mühlenbach =

River in Germany

Coordinates: 52°6′14.328″N 8°29′7.332″E

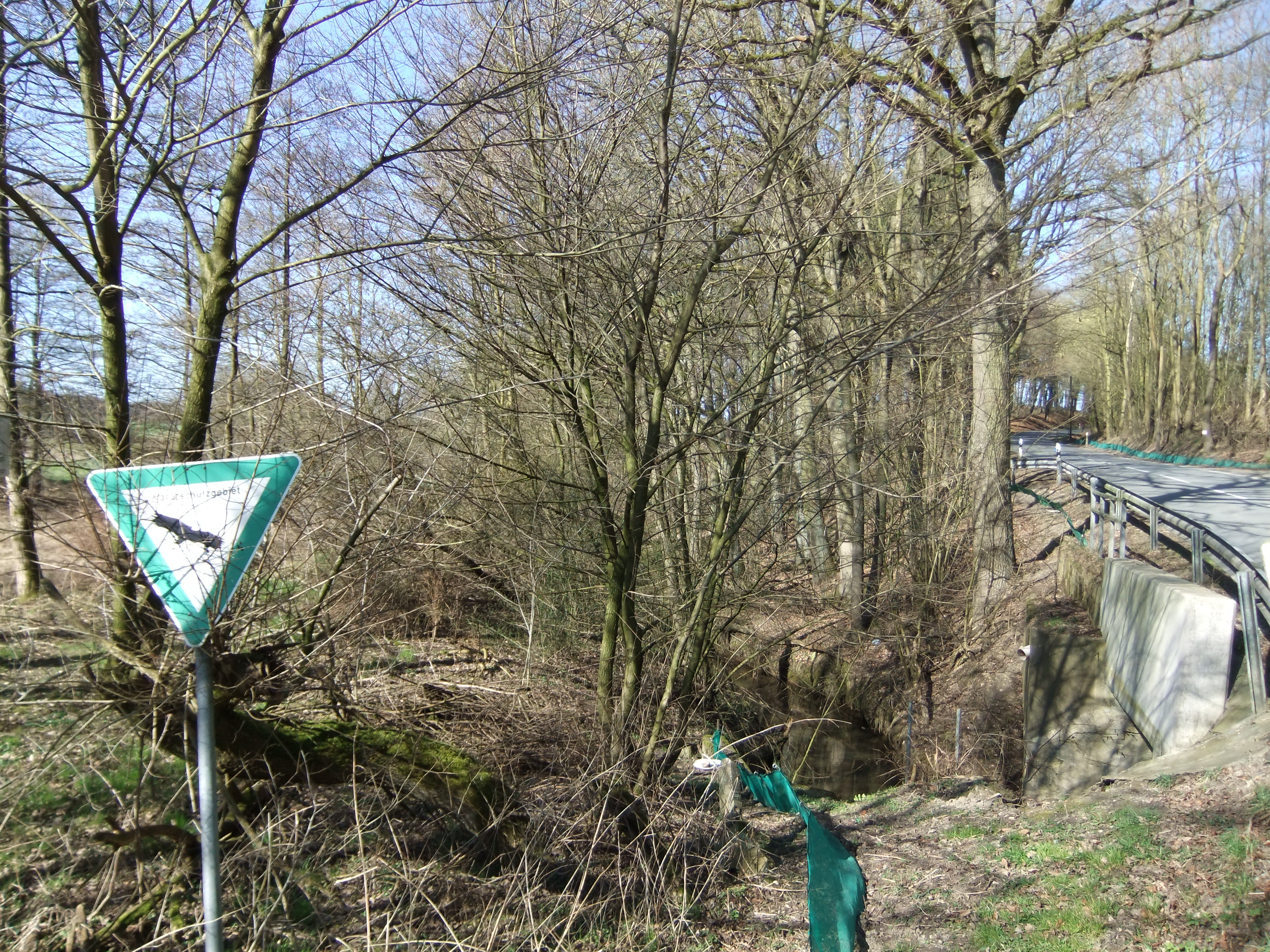

Location
- Region: North Rhine-Westphalia, Germany

Physical characteristics
- Source
  - location: Nagelsholz, near Jöllenbeck, Germany
  - elevation: 143 m
- Mouth
  - location: Near Theesen, into Schwarzbach
  - elevation: 89.7 m
- Length: 6.3 km (3.9 mi)
- Basin size: 13.7 km²

Basin features
- Cities: Bielefeld, Spenge, Werther
- Tributaries
  - left: Preckerbach (Dreeker Bach), Pfarrholzbach, Horstheider Bach

Beckendorfer Mühlenbach is a 6.3 km long river in northeast North Rhine-Westphalia, Germany. It is a tributary of the Schwarzbach, and is a part of the Beckendorfer Mühlenbachtal Nature Reserve.

== Geography and Course ==
The river has a total length of 6.3 km. It springs in the Nagelsholz area of the Jöllenbeck and flows into the Schwarzbach near Theesen. The watercourse flows through Spenge, Werther and Bielefeld on its way from the source to the mouth: The catchment area extends over a small section of the Ravensberger Mulde, north of Bielefeld, south of Spenge and east of Werther.

Going downstream, the river takes in also the Preckerbach (Dreeker Bach) and the Pfarrholzbach. The creek functions temporarily as border between the three munincipalities of Spenge, Werther and Bielefeld.

=== Upper course ===
The Beckendorfer Mühlenbach rises in a spring pond at the Nagelsholz, north of Jöllenbeck, about 750 m west of the Nagelsholz/Schlottkamp road corner and 500 m north of the Jöllenbeck wind turbine. The source area belongs to the nature reserve of Beckendorfer Mühlenbachtal, which accompanies the brook to its mouth. The brook flows south-west for about 1.2 km through a floodplain forest, marking the border between Bielefeld and Spenge for about 300 m, and crosses under the Bargholzstraße between Jöllenbeck and Häger. On the south side of the road, remains of the former Jöllenbeck open-air swimming pool can still be seen. The brook turns then to the south and forms the border between Bielefeld and Werther for more than 1 km. From here on the river flows mainly through a siek typical for the Ravensberg hill country. 700 m south of Bargholzstraße, a nameless tributary brook flows in from the right, together with another one 400 m further south.

=== Middle course ===
The middle course travels 700 m towards the south-east. The Dreeker Bach or Preckerbach flows in from the left, which has its source on the Dreeker Weg in Jöllenbeck, also mostly part of the nature reserve. It travels then another 700 m to the south-east. It crosses under the Beckendorfstraße between Jöllenbeck and Schröttinghausen. After 400 m further south-east, the Pfarrholzbach flows in from the left, which has its source at the Breede in Jöllenbeck. At the mouth there was a mill, which is still being used as a dwelling. Another 500 m further south, below the Heidsieker Heide road, is a hotel building that can be seen from afar. Another unnamed stream flows in from the right. Another 400 m further south, the Horstheider Bach flows in from the left, which has its source at the northern end of Theesen.

=== Lower course ===
The approximately 1 km long lower course moves with a few curves in a narrow alluvial forest almost in a straight north–south direction, which separates Theesen from Babenhausen. Shortly before it flows into the Schwarzbach, the Beckendorfer Mühlenbach passes under the hiking trail that leads from the Köckerhof to the other Hof Meyer to Müdehorst on the Schröttinghauserstraße.

=== Environment ===
Large parts of the creek valley are under natural protection. The approximately 125.3 ha large Beckendorfer Mühlenbachtal nature reserve is managed by the Gütersloh/Bielefeld Biological Station and serves, among other things, to "protect the largely contiguous valley areas of the Beckendorfer Mühlenbach from the source to the confluence with the Schwarzbach and the Seitensieke".

=== Fauna ===
The nature reserve is known for the presence of the kingfisher, the woodpecker and the crested newt.

== See also ==
- List of rivers of North Rhine-Westphalia
