= Holzbach (Belgenbach) =

River in Germany

Location
- Country: Germany
- States: North Rhine-Westphalia

Physical characteristics
- Mouth
  - location: Belgenbach
  - coordinates: 50.5747°N 6.2837°E

Basin features
- Progression: Belgenbach→ Rur→ Meuse→ North Sea

Holzbach (German pronunciation: [ˈhɔlt͡sˌbax]) is a river of North Rhine-Westphalia, Germany. It is 2.1 km long and a left tributary of the Belgenbach.

== See also ==
- List of rivers of North Rhine-Westphalia
