= Oderbach =

River in Germany

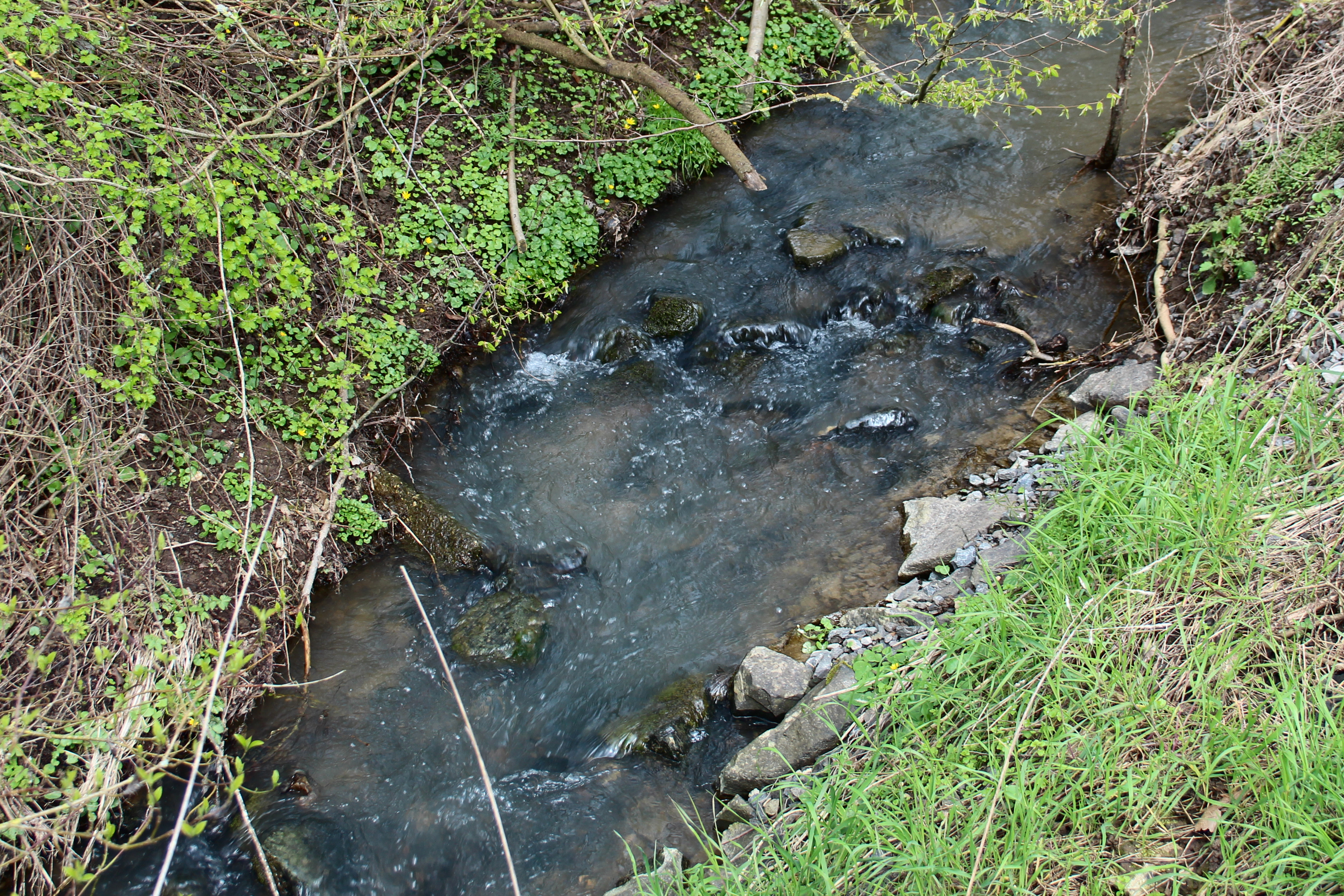

Location
- Country: Germany
- States: Hesse

Physical characteristics
- Mouth
  - location: Elbbach
  - coordinates: 50.4678°N 8.0424°E

Basin features
- Progression: Elbbach→ Lahn→ Rhine→ North Sea

Oderbach is a small river of Hesse, Germany. It flows into the Elbbach near Hadamar.

== See also ==
- List of rivers of Hesse
