= Holzbach (Dickopsbach) =

River in Germany

Location
- Country: Germany
- States: North Rhine-Westphalia

Physical characteristics
- Mouth
  - location: Dickopsbach
  - coordinates: 50.8055°N 6.9169°E

Basin features
- Progression: Dickopsbach→ Rhine→ North Sea

Holzbach (German pronunciation: [ˈhɔlt͡sˌbax]) is a small river of North Rhine-Westphalia, Germany. It is 2.9 km long and a right tributary of the Dickopsbach near Brühl.

== See also ==
- List of rivers of North Rhine-Westphalia
