= Belgenbach =

River in Germany

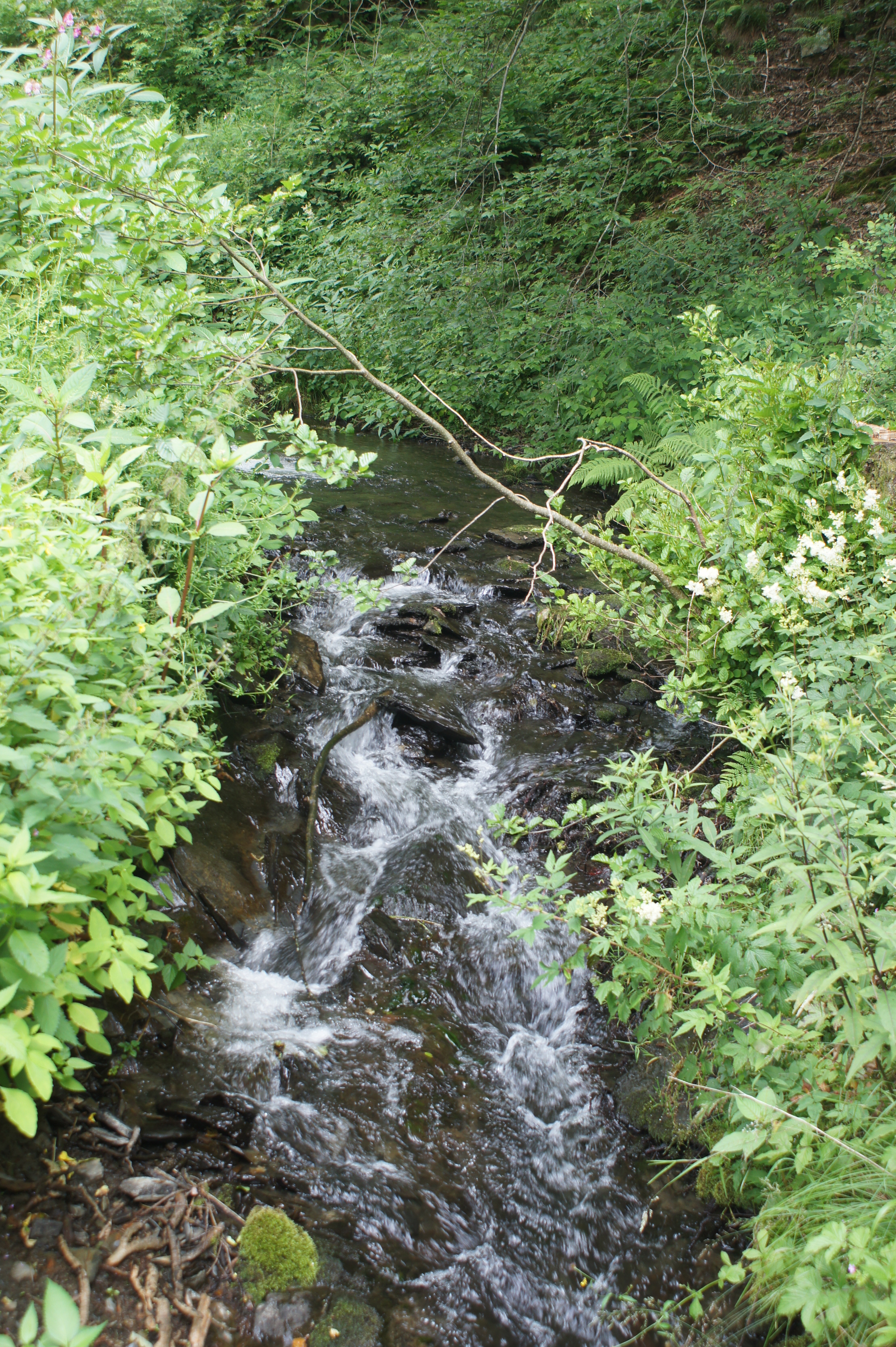

Location
- Country: Germany
- State: North Rhine-Westphalia

Physical characteristics
- Mouth
  - location: Rur
  - coordinates: 50.5636°N 6.2981°E

Basin features
- Progression: Rur→ Meuse→ North Sea

Belgenbach (German pronunciation: [ˈbɛlɡn̩bax]) is a river of North Rhine-Westphalia, Germany. It flows into the Rur near Monschau.

== See also ==
- List of rivers of North Rhine-Westphalia
