= Holzbach (Elbbach, Hadamar) =

River in Germany

Location
- Country: Germany
- States: Hesse

Physical characteristics
- Mouth
  - location: Elbbach
  - coordinates: 50.4531°N 8.0462°E

Basin features
- Progression: Elbbach→ Lahn→ Rhine→ North Sea

The Holzbach (German pronunciation: [ˈhɔlt͡sˌbax]) is a river of Hesse, Germany. It is a six-kilometer-long left tributary of the Elbbach in Hadamar.

== Geography ==
=== Course ===
The Holzbach river rises approximately 500 meters north of Steinbach at an elevation of 274 meters above sea level. Initially flowing south, the stream passes through the village of Steinbach. It then turns west-southwest. After a course of 6.1 kilometers, the Holzbach flows into the Elbbach from the left at an elevation of 137 meters above sea level. This difference in elevation results in an average gradient of 22.5‰. Its 7.297 km² catchment area drains via the Elbbach, Lahn, and Rhen rivers into the North Sea.

The stream typically dries up for extended periods. Initially flowing without any noticeable incision in the terrain, a separate stream valley begins to form after about 3.5 kilometers northwest of Oberweyer, which further downstream becomes an increasingly pronounced incision.

== See also ==
- List of rivers of Hesse
