= Holzbach (Emscher) =

River in Germany

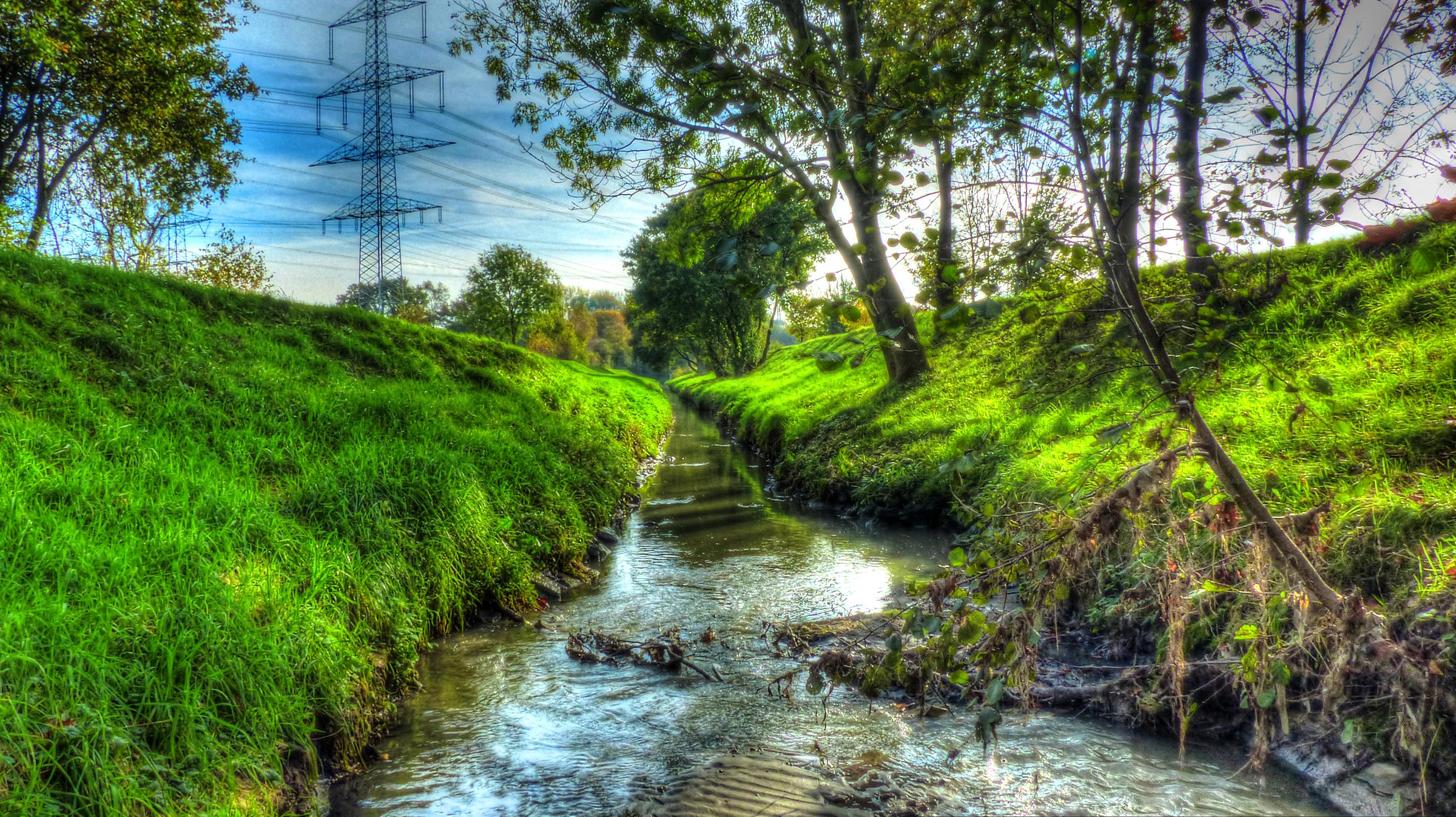

Location
- Country: Germany
- States: North Rhine-Westphalia

Physical characteristics
- Mouth
  - location: Emscher
  - coordinates: 51.5504°N 7.1245°E

Basin features
- Progression: Emscher→ Rhine→ North Sea

Holzbach (German pronunciation: [ˈhɔlt͡sˌbax]) is a small river in North Rhine-Westphalia, Germany. It is 6.9 km long and a right tributary of the Emscher near Gelsenkirchen.

== See also ==
- List of rivers of North Rhine-Westphalia
