= Holzbach (Ems) =

River of North Rhine-Westphalia, Germany

Location
- Country: Germany
- State: North Rhine-Westphalia

Physical characteristics
- Mouth
  - location: Ems
  - coordinates: 51.9508°N 8.0005°E
- Length: 11.1 km (6.9 mi)

Basin features
- Progression: Ems→ North Sea

The Holzbach (German pronunciation: [ˈhɔlt͡sˌbax]) is a river of North Rhine-Westphalia, Germany. It is a left tributary of the Ems in Warendorf.

== See also ==
- List of rivers of North Rhine-Westphalia
