= Salzbach (Elbbach) =

River in Germany

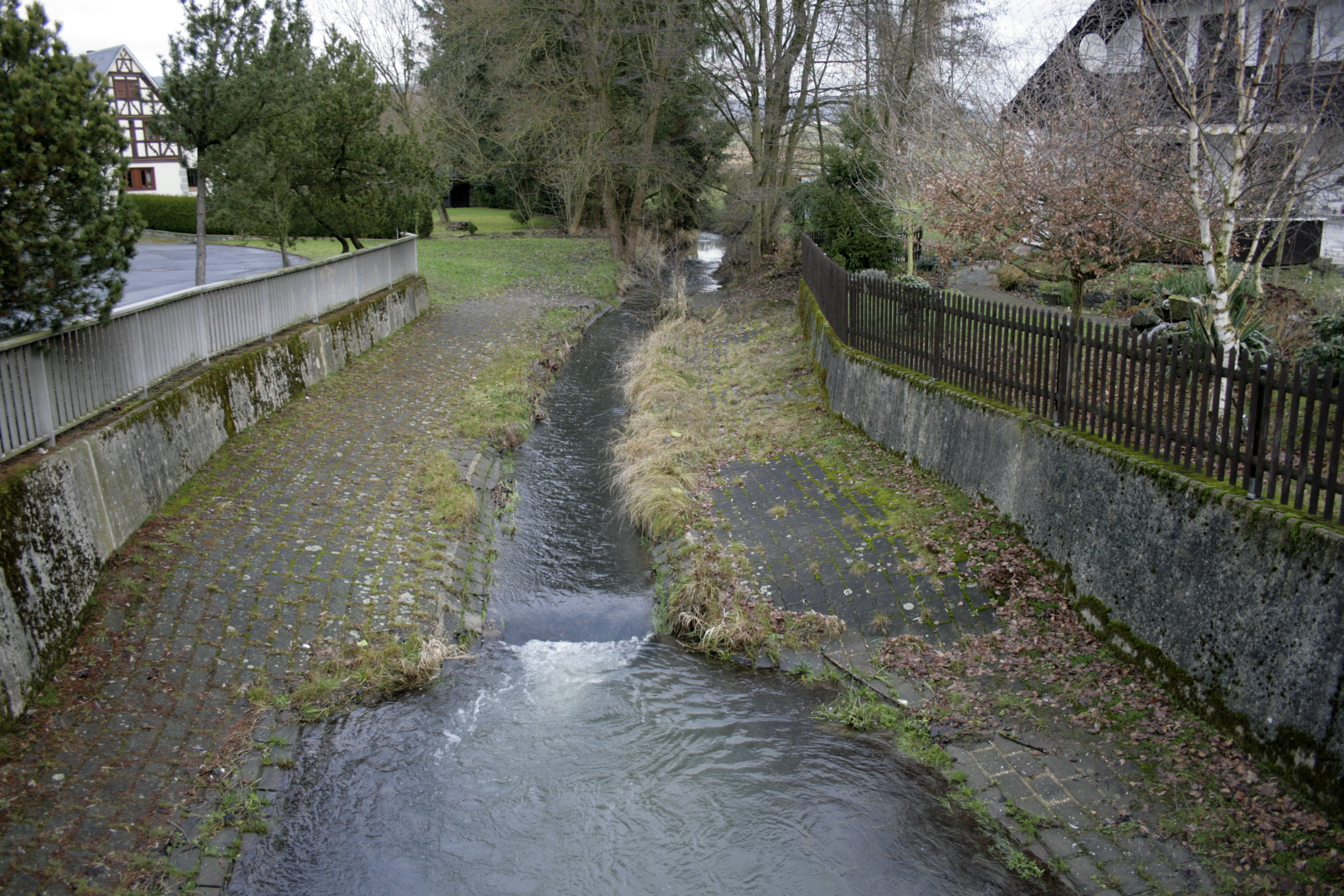
- The Salzach in Thalheim (a part of Dornburg

Location
- Country: Germany
- States: Rhineland-Palatinate; Hesse

Physical characteristics
- Mouth
  - location: Elbbach
  - coordinates: 50.4669°N 8.0403°E

Basin features
- Progression: Elbbach→ Lahn→ Rhine→ North Sea
- Tributaries
  - left: Dorndorfer Bach
  - right: Walmeroder Bach, Molsberger Bach, Seifenbach

Salzbach is a river of Rhineland-Palatinate and Hesse, Germany. It is a right tributary of the Elbbach near Hadamar.

== See also ==
- List of rivers of Hesse
- List of rivers of Rhineland-Palatinate
