= Schloßhofbach =

River in Germany

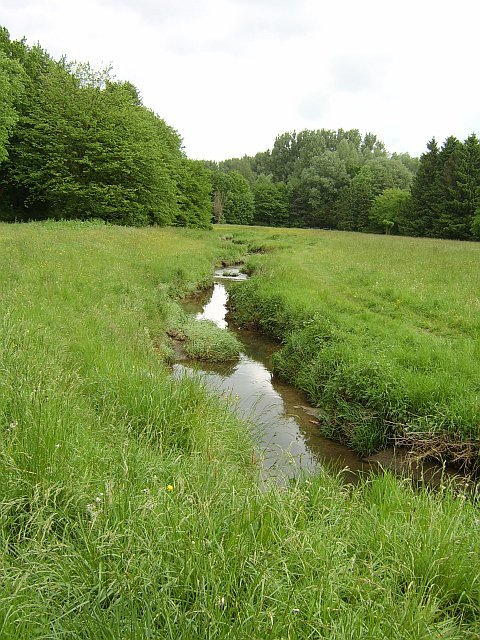

Location
- Country: Germany
- States: North Rhine-Westphalia

Physical characteristics
- Mouth
  - location: Aa
  - coordinates: 52.0594°N 8.5332°E

Basin features
- Progression: Aa→ Werre→ Weser→ North Sea

Schloßhofbach is a small river of North Rhine-Westphalia, Germany. It is 4 km (2.5 mi) long and flows into the Aa as a right tributary in Bielefeld.

== See also ==
- List of rivers of North Rhine-Westphalia
