= Holzbach (Erft) =

River in Germany

Location
- Country: Germany
- States: North Rhine-Westphalia

Physical characteristics
- Mouth
  - location: Erft
  - coordinates: 50.5998°N 6.7965°E

Basin features
- Progression: Erft→ Rhine→ North Sea

Holzbach (German pronunciation: [ˈhɔlt͡sˌbax]) is a small river of North Rhine-Westphalia, Germany. It is 2.6 km long and a right tributary of the Erft, south of Euskirchen.

== See also ==
- List of rivers of North Rhine-Westphalia
