= Holzbach (Elbbach, Gemünden) =

River in Germany

- The Holzbach at Hof Dapprich, Seck

Location
- Country: Germany
- State: Rhineland-Palatinate

Physical characteristics
- Mouth
  - location: Elbbach
  - coordinates: 50.5439°N 8.0163°E

Basin features
- Progression: Elbbach→ Lahn→ Rhine→ North Sea

Holzbach (German pronunciation: [ˈhɔlt͡sˌbax]) is a river of Rhineland-Palatinate, Germany. It is a left tributary of the Elbbach in Gemünden.

== See also ==
- List of rivers of Rhineland-Palatinate
