= Eickumer Mühlenbach =

River in Germany

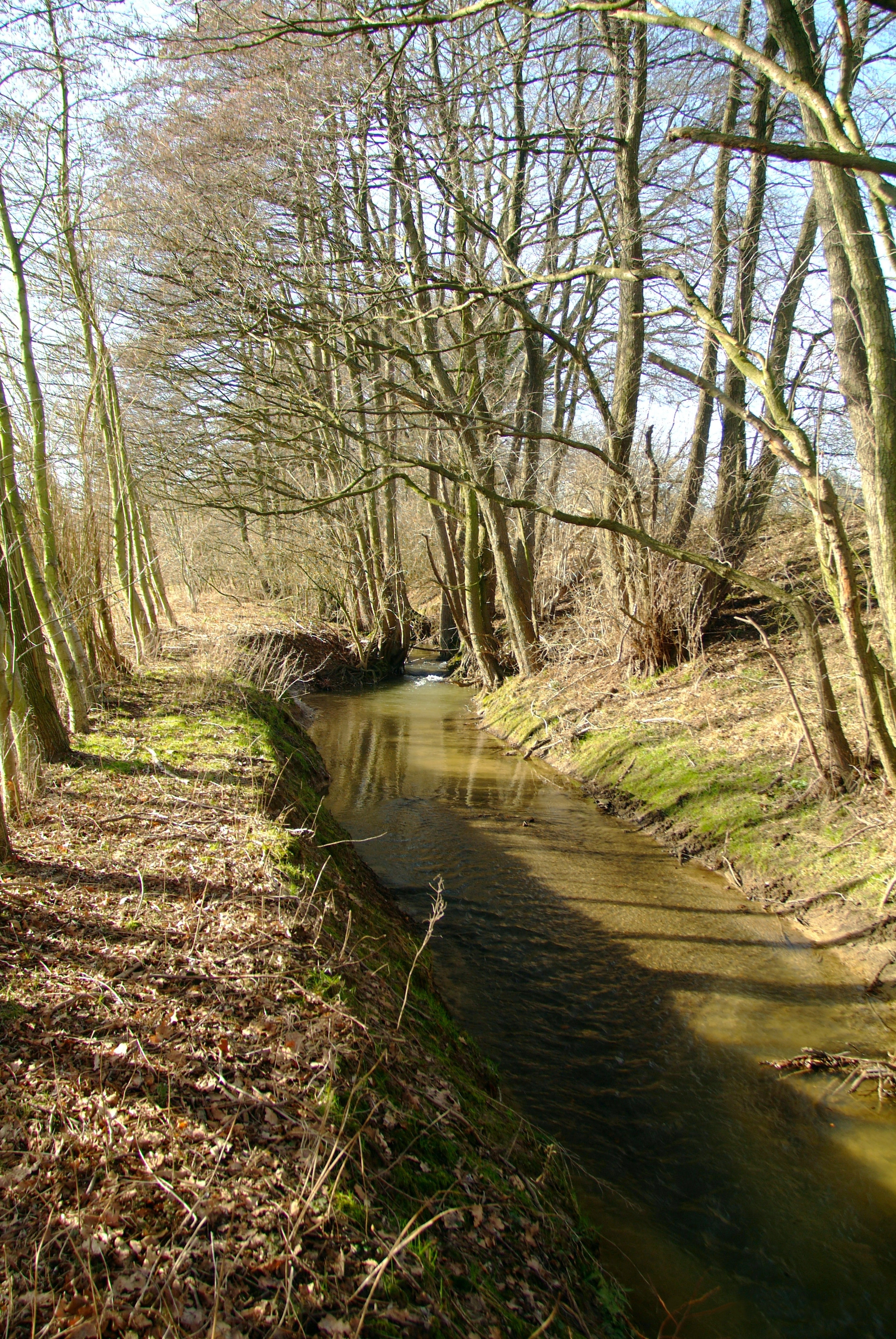

Location
- Country: Germany
- State: North Rhine-Westphalia

Physical characteristics
- Mouth
  - location: Aa
  - coordinates: 52.1047°N 8.6521°E

Basin features
- Progression: Aa→ Werre→ Weser→ North Sea

Eickumer Mühlenbach (also: Kinsbeke) is a river in North Rhine-Westphalia, Germany. It flows into the Aa in Herford.

== See also ==
- List of rivers of North Rhine-Westphalia
