= Niederhadamar =

Human settlement in Germany

Coordinates: 50°26′N 8°02′E

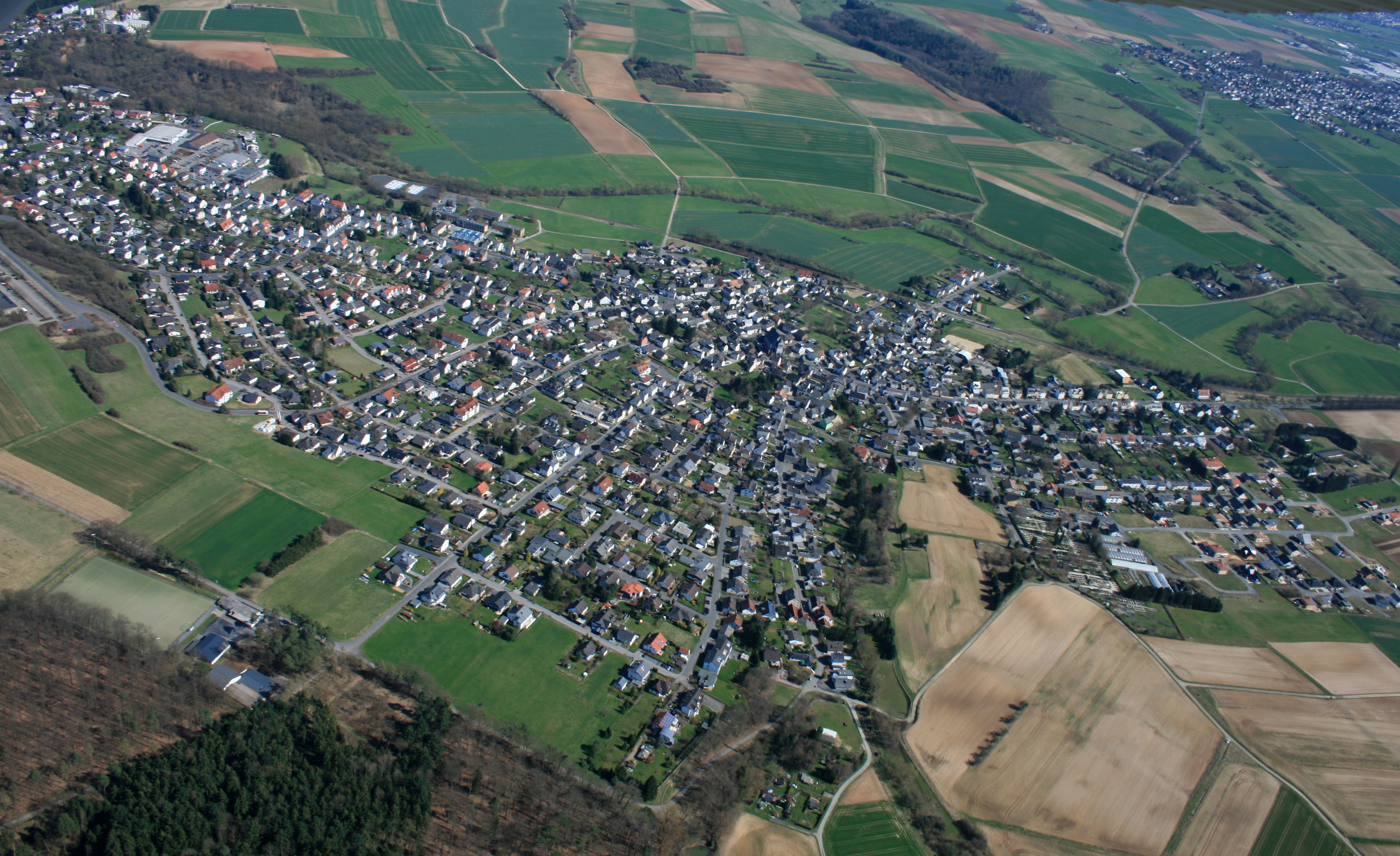

Niederhadamar is a German village belonging to the municipality of Hadamar, with 4,000 inhabitants. It is located between several other communities: Elz to the south, Hundsangen to the west, Hadamar to the north, and Offheim to the east. There is also a forest to the west of the city.

Niederhadamar has two kindergartens, one Protestant and one Catholic, and a Catholic church, St. Peter's. It also has a school with an enrollment of approximately 2000 pupils as well as a ground school.

== Transport links ==
The Niederhadamar train stop is located on the Limburg-Altenkirchen railway and served by the line number RB90 from Limburg to Siegen, served by Hessische Landesbahn, section DreiLänderBahn, Niederhadamar is located in the zone number 6040 of the transport association Rhein-Main-Verkehrsverbund and the zone number 172 of the transport association Verkehrsverbund Rhein-Mosel.
