= Lutter (Aa) =

River of North Rhine-Westphalia, Germany

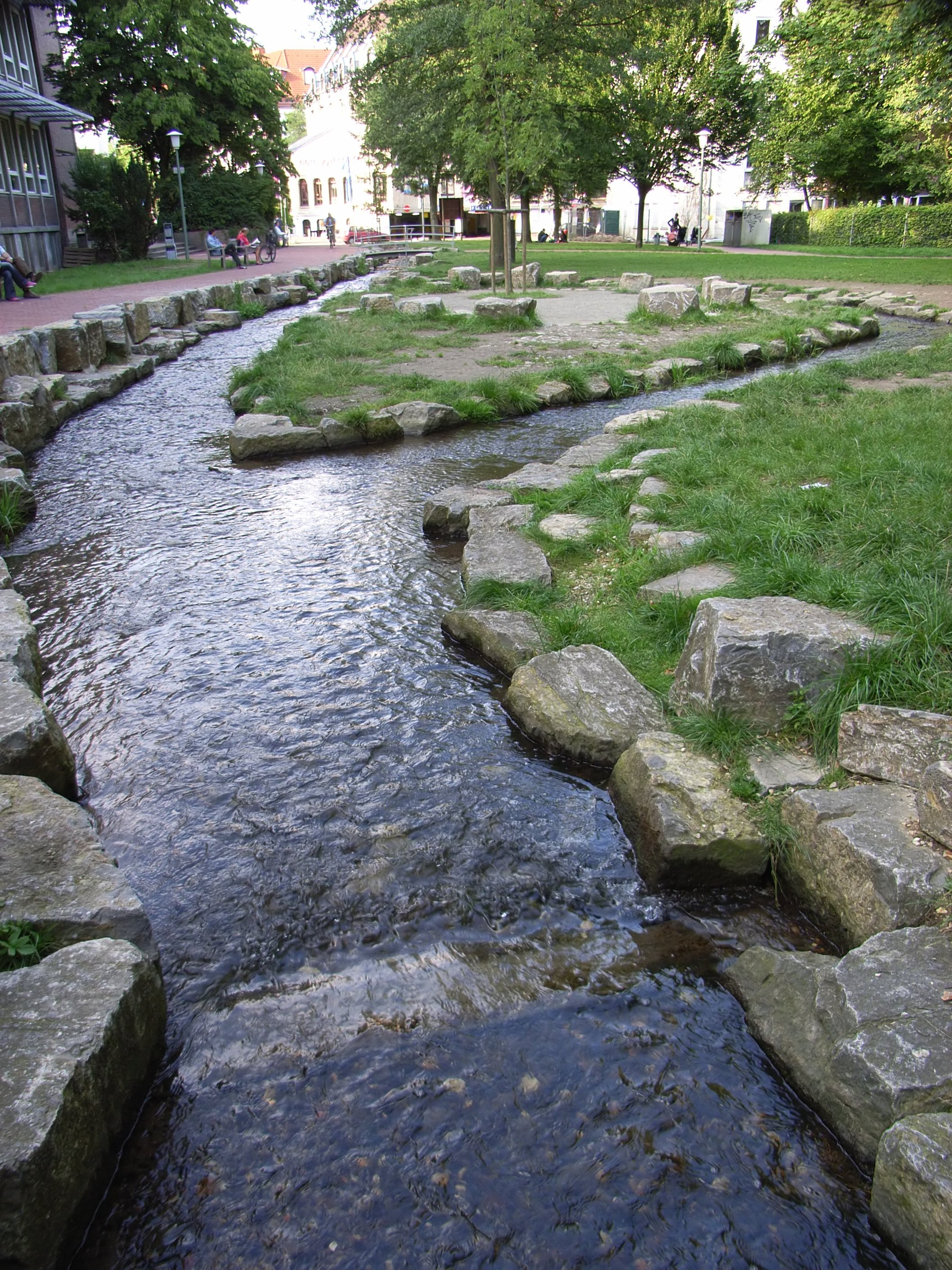

Location
- Country: Germany
- State: North Rhine-Westphalia

Physical characteristics
- Mouth
  - location: Aa
  - coordinates: 52.0637°N 8.6158°E
- Length: 13.3 km (8.3 mi)

Basin features
- Progression: Aa→ Werre→ Weser→ North Sea

Lutter (German pronunciation: [ˈlʊtɐ]; also: Lutterbach) is a river of North Rhine-Westphalia, Germany. The river Aa is formed at its confluence with the Johannisbach (considered the upper course of the Aa).

== See also ==
- List of rivers of North Rhine-Westphalia
