= Dickopsbach =

River in Germany

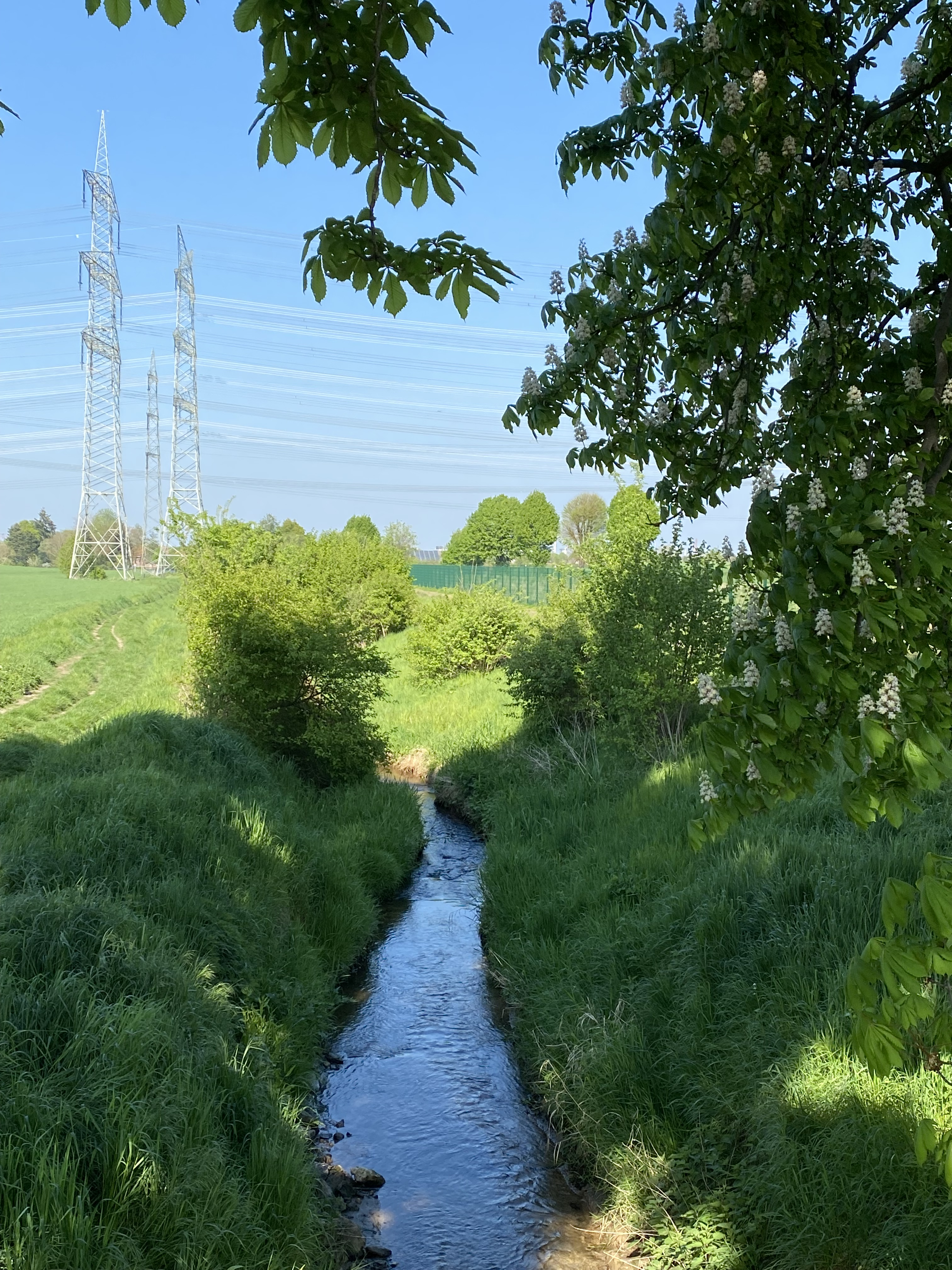

Location
- Country: Germany
- State: North Rhine-Westphalia

Physical characteristics
- Mouth
  - location: Rhine
  - coordinates: 50.8289°N 6.9808°E
- Length: 10.4 km (6.5 mi)

Basin features
- Progression: Rhine→ North Sea

Dickopsbach (German pronunciation: [ˈdɪkɔpsbax]) is a river of North Rhine-Westphalia, Germany. It flows into the Rhine in Wesseling.

== See also ==
- List of rivers of North Rhine-Westphalia
