= Langendernbach =

- Ortsteil of Dornburg
- Coat of arms
- Interactive map of Langendernbach
- Location within Germany Location within Hesse
- Coordinates: 50°32′6″N 8°3′0″E
- Country: Germany
- State: Hesse
- Admin. region: Gießen
- District: Limburg-Weilburg
- Municipality: Dornburg
- Elevation: 240 m (790 ft)

Population (2006-12-31)
  - Total: 1,092
- Time zone: UTC+01:00 (CET)
  - Summer (DST): UTC+02:00 (CEST)
- Postal codes: 65599
- Dialling codes: 06436
- Vehicle registration: LM

Langendernbach is a village in the municipality Dornburg, Limburg-Weilburg district, Hesse, in western Germany.
