= Schwarzbach (Aa) =

River in Germany

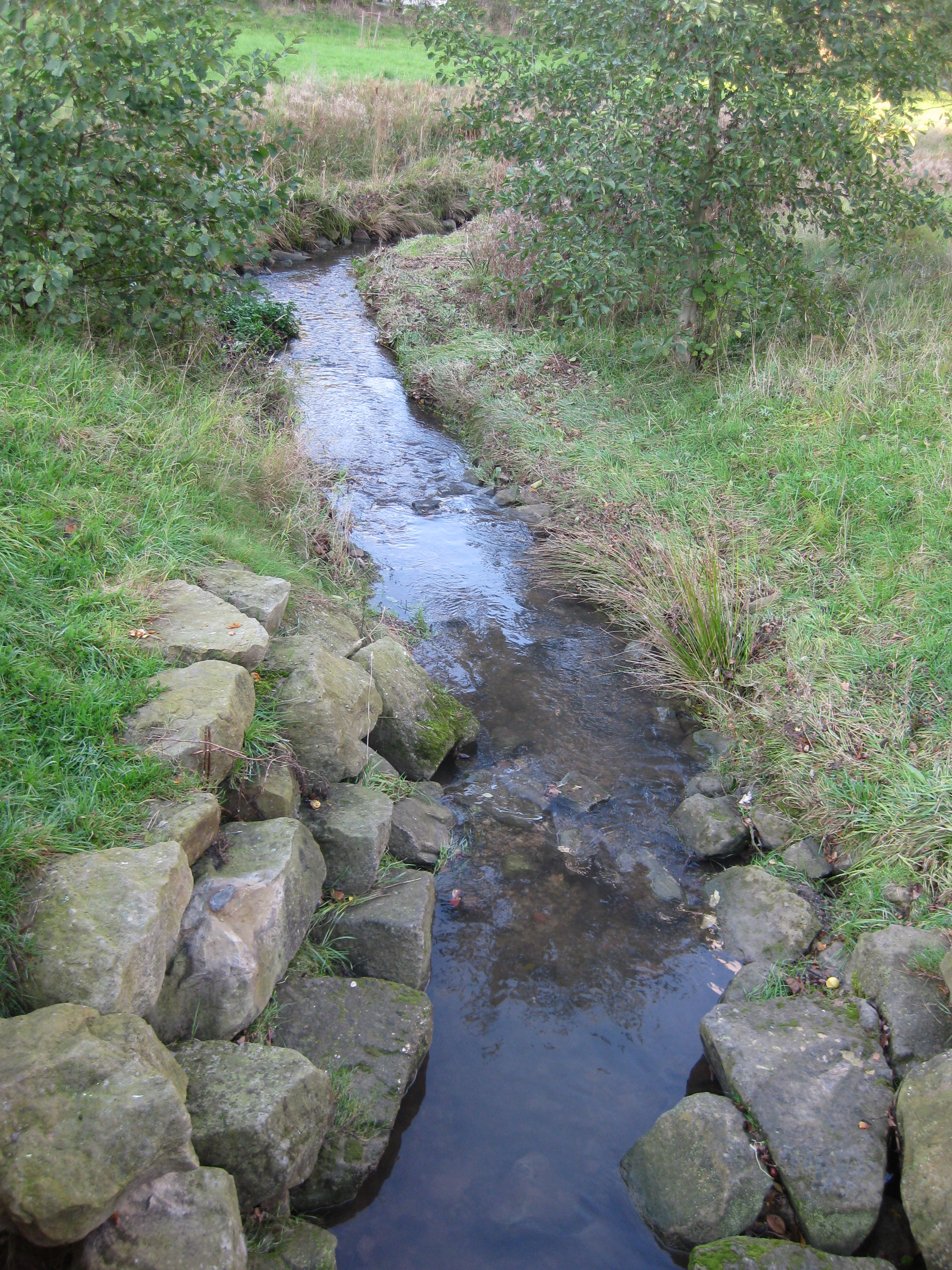

Location
- Country: Germany
- State: North Rhine-Westphalia

Physical characteristics
- Mouth
  - location: Aa
  - coordinates: 52.0663°N 8.5081°E
- Length: 10.3 km (6.4 mi)

Basin features
- Progression: Aa→ Werre→ Weser→ North Sea

Schwarzbach (German pronunciation: [ˈʃvaʁtsˌbax]) is a river of North Rhine-Westphalia, Germany. It is a right tributary of the Johannisbach, that in the lower course is called Aa.

== See also ==
- List of rivers of North Rhine-Westphalia
