= Elbtal =

- Municipality
- Flag Coat of arms

- Location of Elbtal within Limburg-Weilburg district
- Interactive map of Elbtal
- Location within Germany Location within Hesse
- Coordinates: 50°31′N 08°04′E
- Country: Germany
- State: Hesse
- Admin. region: Gießen
- District: Limburg-Weilburg

Government
  - Mayor (2020–26): Joachim Lehnert (Ind.)

Area
  - Total: 11.12 km^{2} (4.29 sq mi)
- Elevation: 259 m (850 ft)

Population (2025-12-31)
  - Total: 2,377
  - Density: 213.8/km^{2} (553.6/sq mi)
- Time zone: UTC+01:00 (CET)
  - Summer (DST): UTC+02:00 (CEST)
- Postal codes: 65627
- Dialling codes: 06436
- Vehicle registration: LM, WEL
- Website: gemeinde-elbtal.de

Elbtal is a municipality in Limburg-Weilburg district in Hesse, Germany.

== Geography ==
=== Location ===
Elbtal lies on the Westerwald’s southern slope above the Lahn valley.

=== Constituent communities ===
Elbtal’s Ortsteile are Dorchheim (administrative seat), Elbgrund, Hangenmeilingen, und Heuchelheim.

== History ==
The hills on either side of the Elbbach were already inhabited by the New Stone Age, as shown by the many finds of stone tools. The circular rampart called Heidenhäuschen ("Little Heath House") near Hangenmeilingen has been dated to Hallstatt times (750 to 450 BC).

Heuchelheim had its first documentary mention in 772 in a donation document from the Lorsch Abbey. Waldmannshausen, one of Elbgrund’s forerunner communities, had its first documentary mention on 21 October 1138 in connection with its donation to the monastery at St. Goar. Dorchheim had its first documentary mention in 1215 in a document from the Maria Laach Abbey while Mühlbach, Elbgrund’s other forerunner community, was first mentioned in 1230 in a donation by the House of Nassau to the Teutonic Knights. Hangenmeilingen had its first documentary mention on 21 January 1333.

The still preserved moated castle of Waldmannshausen in Elbgrund was in the Middle Ages the seat of the Walpode, who held the judiciary overlordship in the surrounding country. The building work comprises a Late Gothic dwelling house with two round towers and commercial buildings, which are still used today. To the west are found the ruins of an older, cross-shaped castle. In 1835, the castle came into the prominent Bethmann banking family’s ownership. After the Second World War, it was quarters for the United States Army. Today its use is scholastic.

One of the oldest buildings in the community is the Marienstätter Hof in Dorchheim, which has been used since 1993 as Elbtal’s town hall. Its exact building year is unknown. It is one of three still preserved estates that belonged to Marienstatt Abbey.

Until the mid 20th century, clay and basalt were quarried in Mühlbach’s municipal area.

On 1 February 1971, the communities of Dorchheim, Hangenmeilingen and Heuchelheim merged into one with the name Elbtal. On 1 July 1973, the then still autonomous community of Elbgrund also joined, after itself having been formed in a merger in 1936 of the formerly autonomous communities of Mühlbach and Waldmannshausen.

== Politics ==
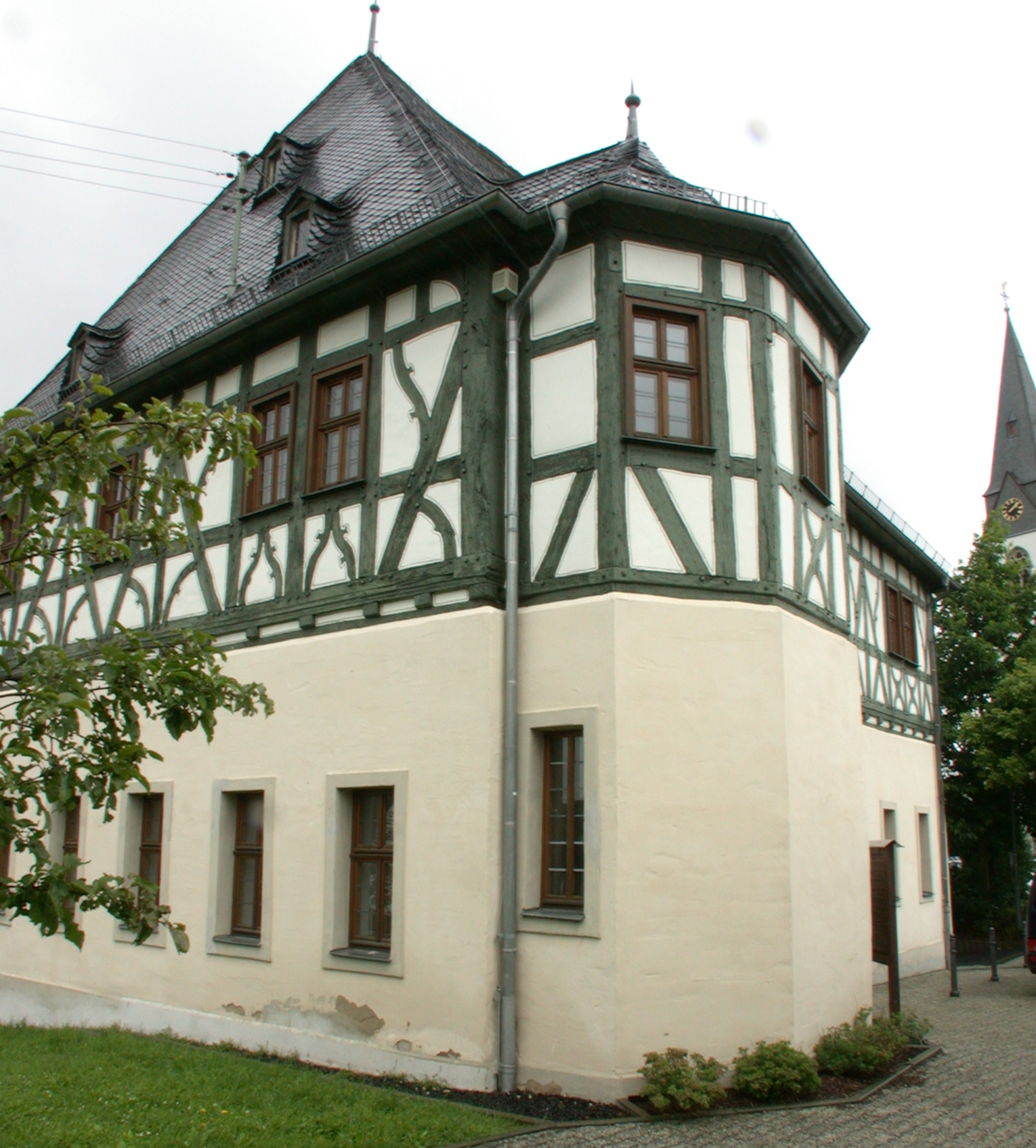
Elbtal Town Hall in Dorchheim

=== Community council ===
The municipal election held on 26 March 2006 yielded the following results:

Parties and voter communities		% 2006	seats 2006	% 2001	seats 2001
CDU	Christian Democratic Union of Germany	43.2	7	41.3	6
SPD	Social Democratic Party of Germany	27.1	4	25.3	4
FWG	Freie Wählergemeinschaft Elbtal	13.5	2	13.8	2
FBH	Freie Bürgerliste Hangenmeilingen	9.4	1	10.0	2
BLD	Bürgerliste Dorchheim	6.8	1	9.6	1
Total		100.0	15	100.0	15
voter turnout in %		45.6		57.0	

== Sightseeing ==
- Waldmannshausen Castle
- Kapelle St. Nikolaus (“Saint Nicholas’s Chapel”) at the Dorchheim cemetery

Built in the early 12th century and converted in the 16th century, it has central pillars with rich carving and a sanctuary with a painting gallery.

== Economy and infrastructure ==
Elbtal is a residential community. Besides the trades and crafts that are customary in such a place, there is no industry.

=== Transport ===
The community lies on Bundesstraße 54 (Siegen - Limburg) and is thereby well linked to the long-distance road network.

=== Education ===
The Elbtalschule in Dorchheim serves as a common primary school for the community. Nearby secondary schools are the Mittelpunktschule St. Blasius in Frickhofen and the Fürst Johann Ludwig Schule in Hadamar.

=== Public institutions ===
- Kindergarten Elbtal "Sonnenblume" in Dorchheim
- Kindergarten Elbtal "St. Josef" in Dorchheim
- Dorchheim Volunteer Fire Brigade, founded 1895 (includes Youth Fire Brigade)
- Elbgrund Volunteer Fire Brigade, founded 1934 (includes Youth Fire Brigade)
- Hangenmeilingen Volunteer Fire Brigade, founded 1934 (includes Youth Fire Brigade)
- Heuchelheim Volunteer Fire Brigade, founded 1967 (includes Youth Fire Brigade)
