= Aa (Werre) =

River in Germany

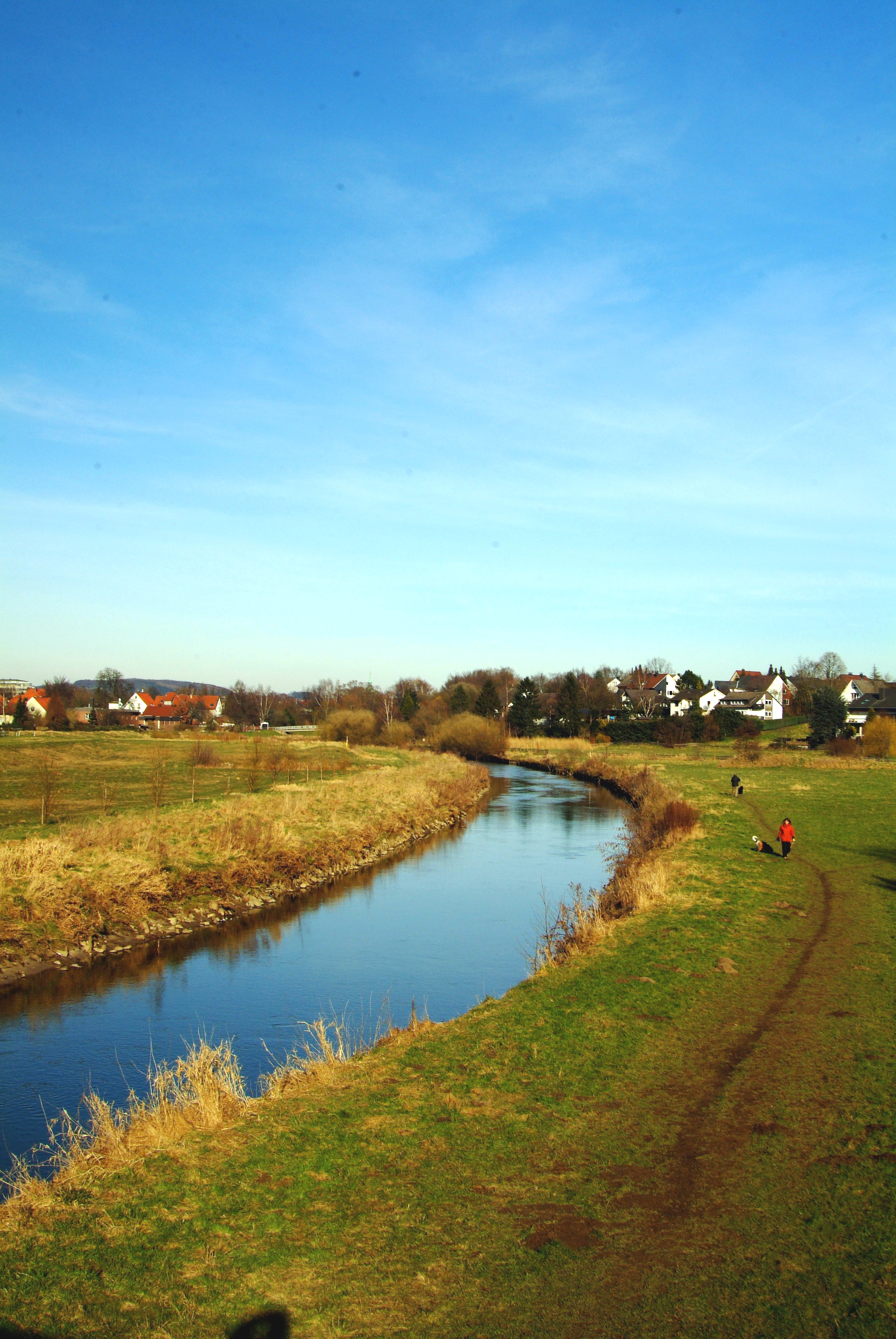

- North Rhine-Westphalia

Location
- Country: Germany
- State: North Rhine-Westphalia

Physical characteristics
- Mouth
  - location: Werre
  - coordinates: 52.1236°N 8.6703°E
- Length: 26.0 km (16.2 mi)
- Basin size: 256 km^{2} (99 sq mi)

Basin features
- Progression: Werre→ Weser→ North Sea

Aa (also: Westfälische Aa, "Westphalian Aa") is a river of North Rhine-Westphalia, Germany. It is a left tributary of the Werre, which it joins in Herford. It is formed by the confluence of two small streams in Bielefeld-Milse. In its upper part, it is called Johannisbach.

== See also ==
- List of rivers of North Rhine-Westphalia
