= Großer Finsterberg =

Mountain in Thuringia, Germany

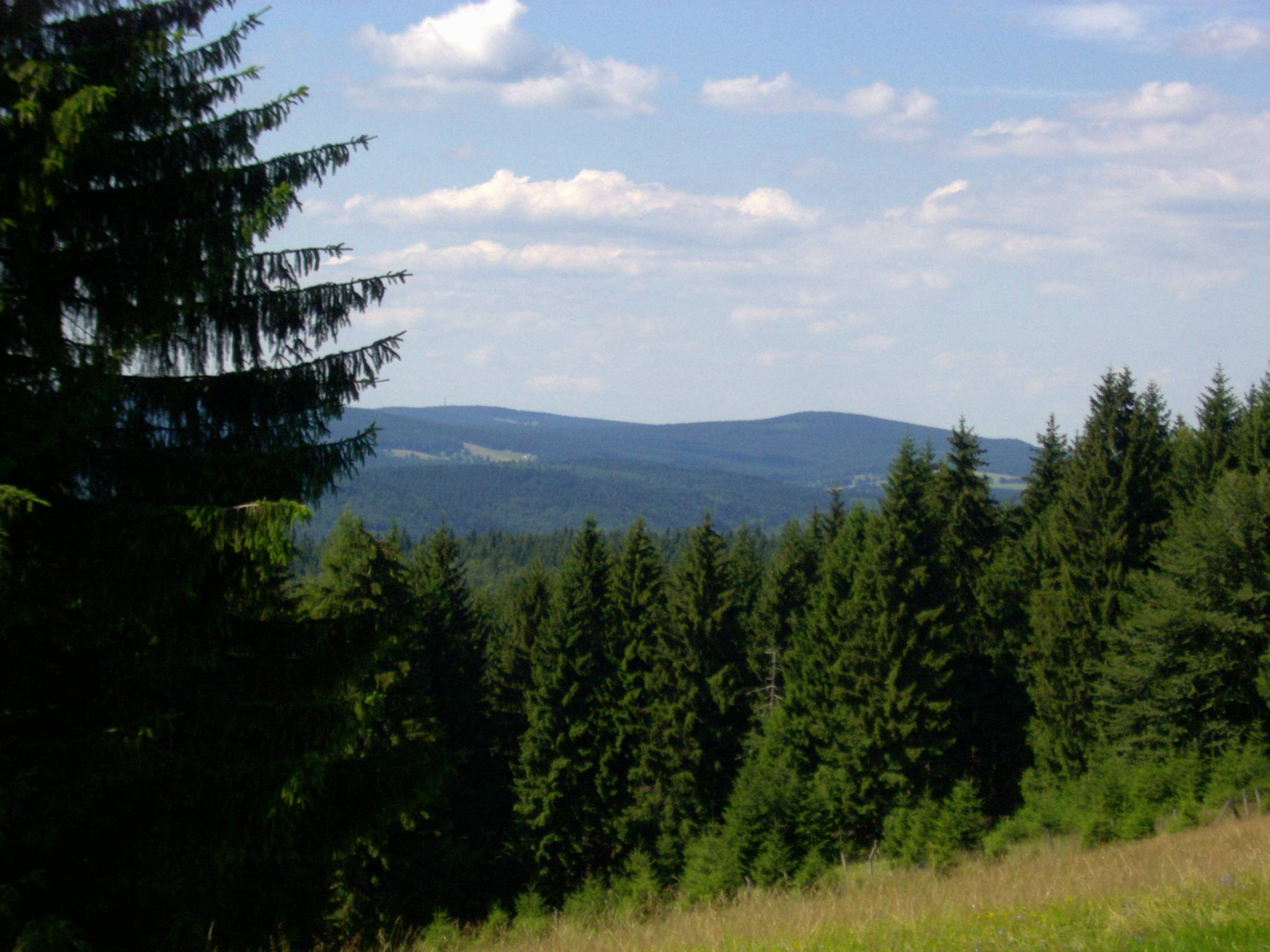
- View from Kalter Staudenkopf (768 m) of the Großer (944 m, half right) and Kleiner (875 m, right) Finsterberg. Half left is the Schneekopf (978 m) and its subpeak, the Teufelskreise (967 m, in front) with the Schmücke (just below, pasture) and Fichtenkopf (944 m, to its left). The pasture below lies at the foot of the Großer Eisenberg (907 m, on the left, hidden). In the central foreground is the Volkmarskopf (726 m).

Highest point
- Elevation: 944.1 m above sea level (NHN) (3,097 ft)
- Prominence: 122 m ↓ Mordfleck
- Isolation: 3.8 km → Teufelskreis (Schneekopf)
- Coordinates: 50°38′17″N 10°48′06″E

Geography
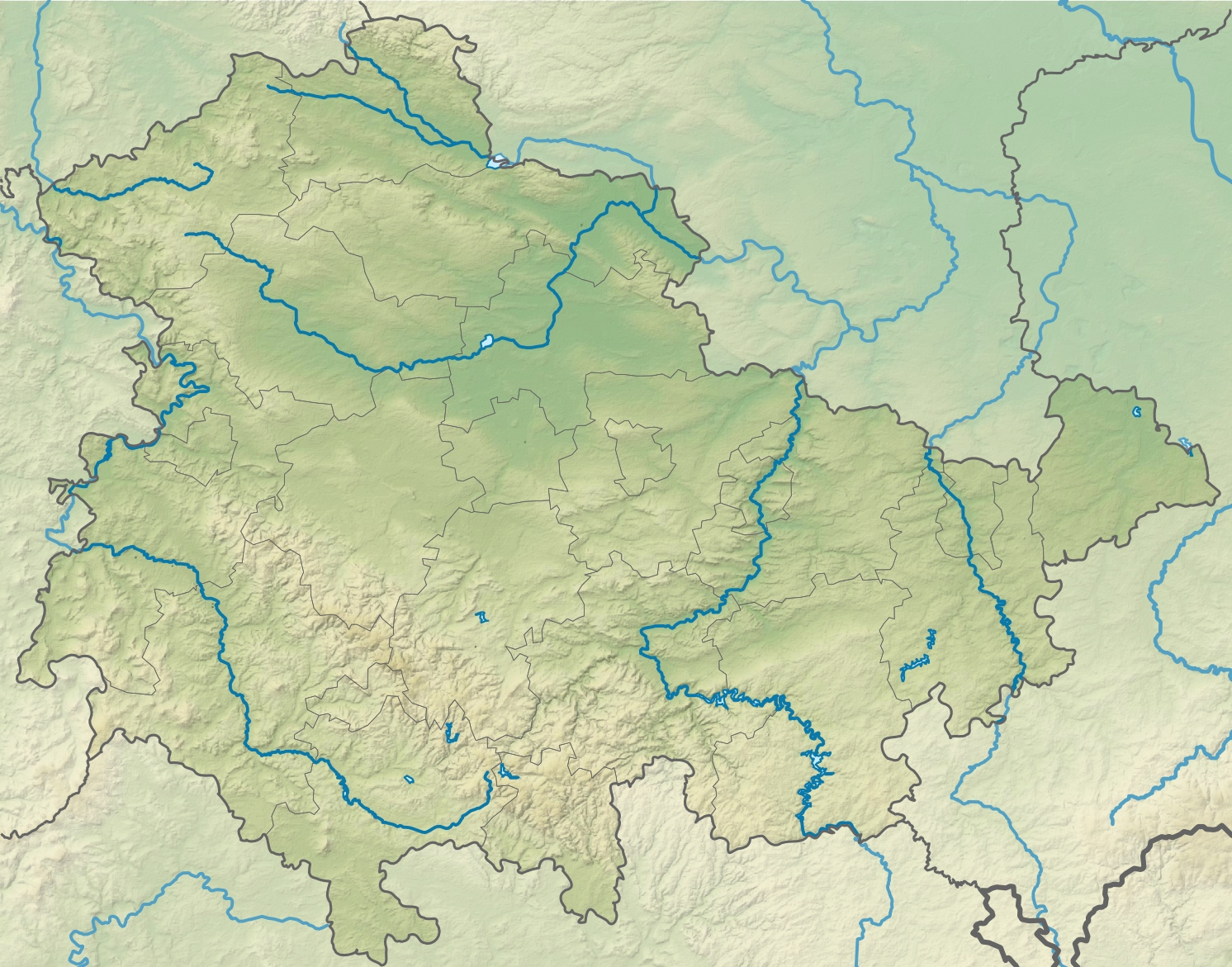
- Location within Thuringia
- Location: Thuringia, Germany
- Parent range: Thuringian Forest

Climbing
- Normal route: Along the L 2615 between Schmiedefeld/R. and Oberhof
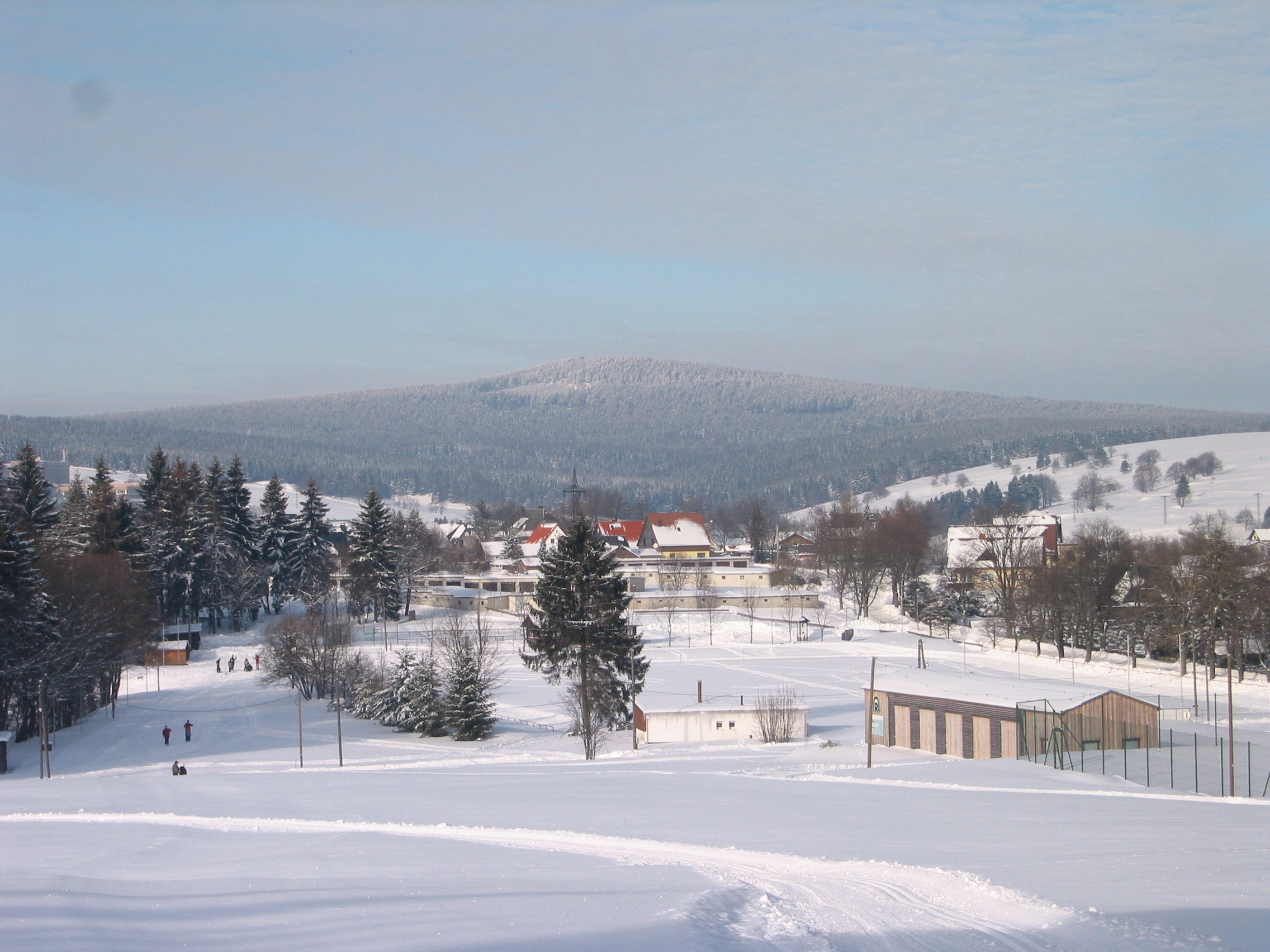

The Großer Finsterberg is a mountain, 944.1 m above NHN, in the Thuringian Forest not far from the villages of Stützerbach and Schmiedefeld am Rennsteig. It is the third highest peak in the German state of Thuringia.

== Description ==
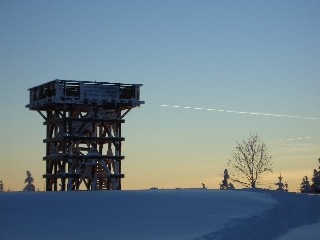
Former observation tower on the Finsterberg

The volcanic origin of the Großer Finsterberg may be seen clearly from the conical shape of its summit, which tilts markedly towards the west.

Apart from the summit plateau, the mountain is completely covered by a nearly natural cotton and reed grass spruce woodland and in most places there is no shrub layer. On the plateau a special mountain pasture vegetation has formed with baldmoney, veronica and St. John's wort.

== Location ==
=== Subpeaks and boundaries ===
One kilometre away to the north-northeast is its smaller brother, the Kleiner Finsterberg or Finsterberger Köpfchen (875 m). Two less spectacular eastern subpeaks, 2 to 3 kilometres distant both bear the name Rosenkopf (728 m and 673 m). To the west, northwest and north the Finsterberg is bounded by the Freibach and, to the southeast, by the Taubach, both headstreams of the Ilm.

=== Neighbouring peaks ===
Two kilometres to the southwest and separated by the Rennsteig (ca. 800 metres away), is the Großer Eisenberg (907 m). To the northwest, four to five kilometres away, are the two main summits of the range, the Schneekopf (978 m) and the Großer Beerberg (983 m), both of which are higher than the Finsterberg.

== History ==
Since the middle of the 18th century at the Mordfleck (1.5 kilometres east of the summit) and at the Blauer Stein (1 km away to the northwest), stone coal has been mined.

Towards the end of the Second World War, soldiers' graves were dug on the mountainside. From 1954 to 1990 the summit of the Großer Finsterberg was used by the Soviet Union for military purposes and was thus out of bounds to the public.

== View ==
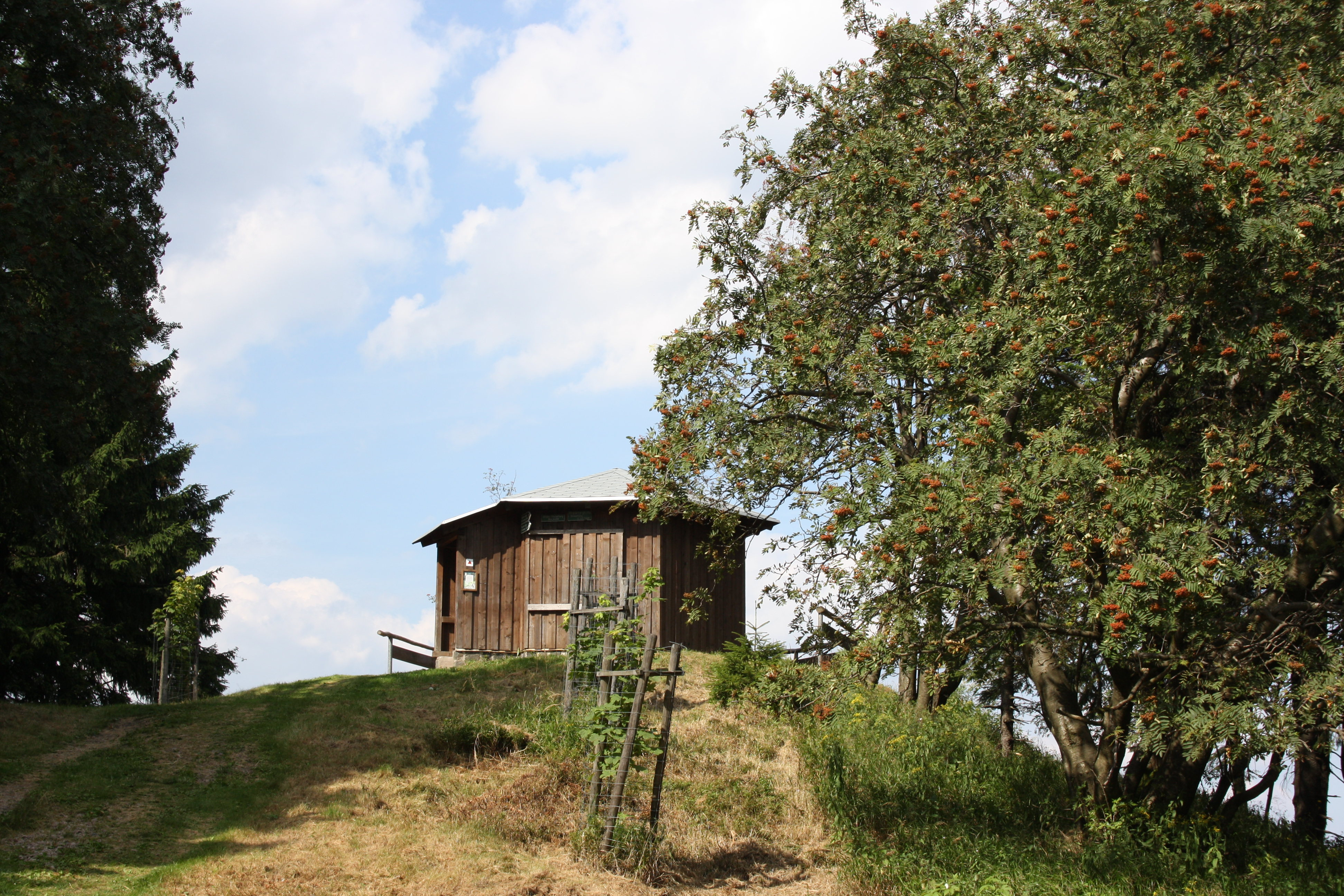
Refuge hut on the Finsterberg

Between 1999 or 2001 and 2017 or 2018, a wooden observation platform stood at the summit of the Großer Finsterberg. As of June 2018, there are plans to reinstate the tower. The original tower gave views of the Kickelhahn, the Ringberg on the Adlersberg near Suhl, the Dolmar near Meiningen and the only two mountains in Thuringia that are higher — the Großer Beerberg (983 m) and the Schneekopf (978 m) — below whose summits the Schmücke may also be seen. On the east side there is a small hut with another observation point.
