= Schobse =

Location
- Country: Germany
- States: Thuringia

Physical characteristics
- Mouth
  - location: Wohlrose
  - coordinates: 50.6480°N 11.0076°E

Basin features
- Progression: Wohlrose→ Ilm→ Saale→ Elbe→ North Sea

Schobse is a river of Thuringia, Germany. It flows into the Wohlrose in Gehren.

== See also ==
- List of rivers of Thuringia
