= Schneekopf =

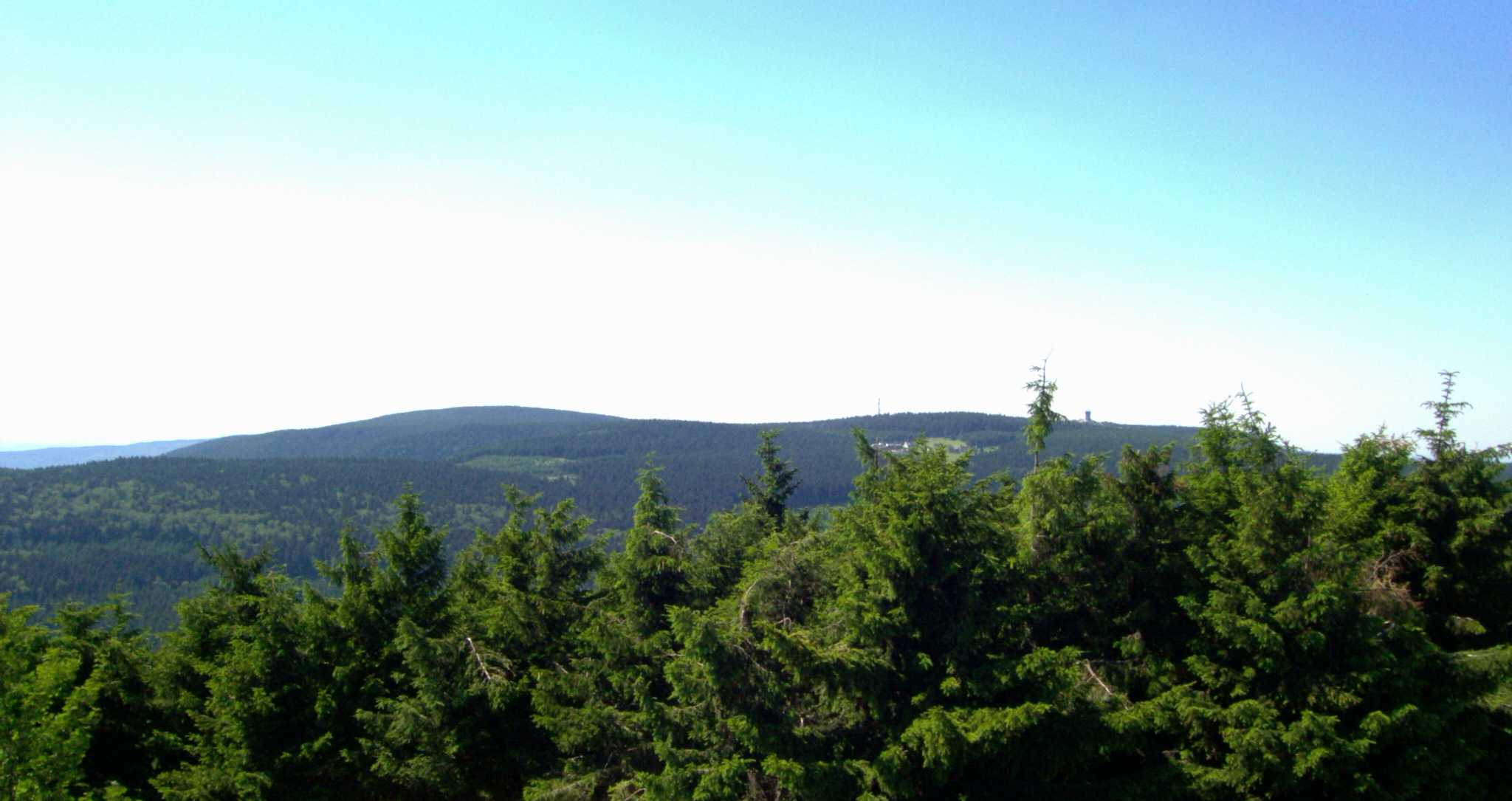
- View from the Großer Finsterberg of the Großer Beerberg (l) and the Schneekopf (r, tower)

Highest point
- Elevation: 978 m above sea level (NHN) (3,208.7 ft)
- Prominence: 59.4 m ↓ Adler
- Isolation: 1.6 km → Großer Beerberg to Großer Beerberg
- Coordinates: 50°39′57″N 10°45′52″E

Geography
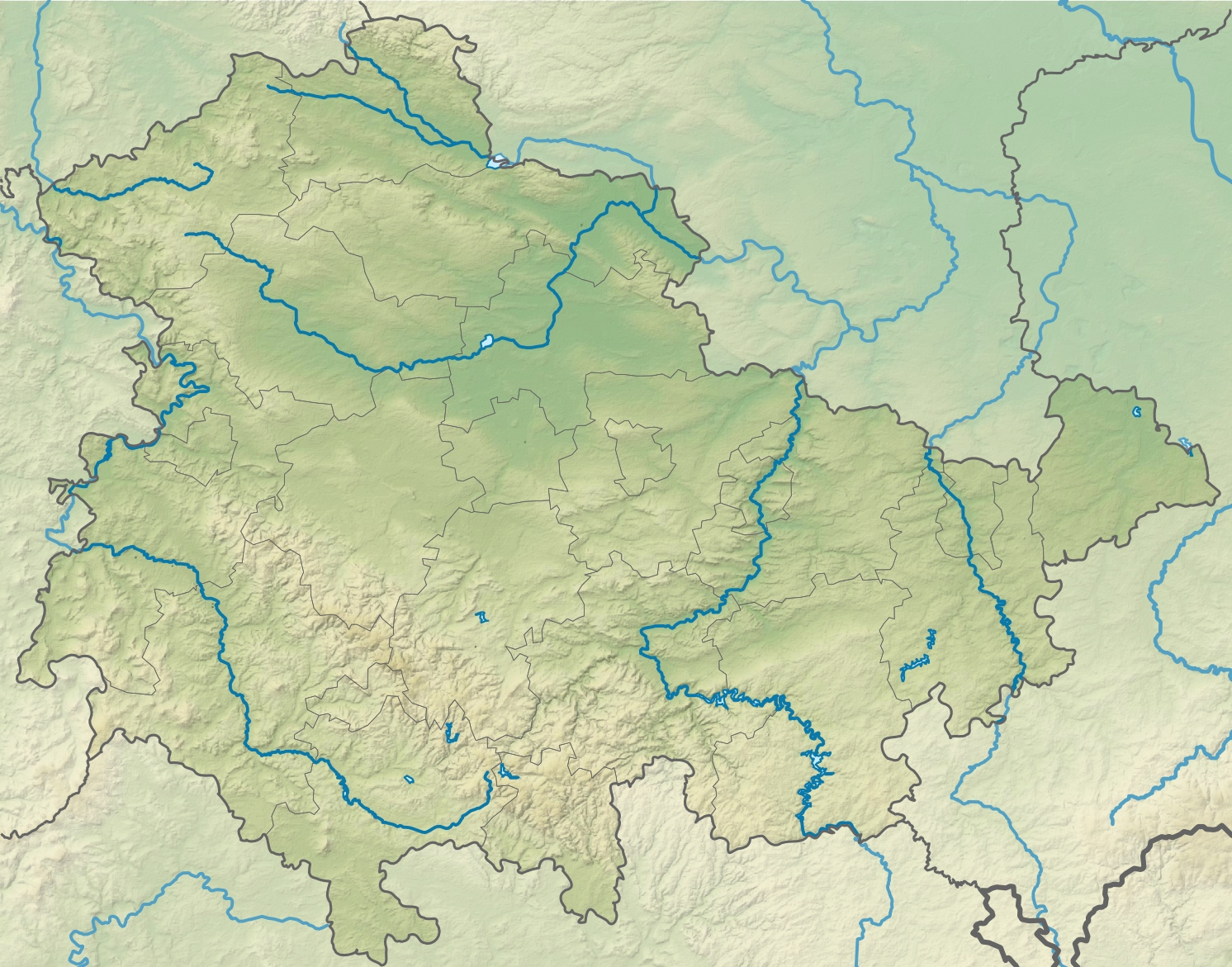
- Location within Thuringia
- Location: Near Gehlberg; Ilm-Kreis Thuringia, Germany
- Parent range: Thuringian Forest

Geology
- Rock type: Porphyry

The Schneekopf (German pronunciation: [ˈʃneːˌkɔpf]) near Gehlberg in the Thuringian county of Ilm-Kreis is 978 m above sea level (NHN) and thus the second highest peak in the Thuringian Forest after its western neighbour, the Großer Beerberg (983 m). The Adler Saddle between them is only about 59.4 metres lower than the two summits. To the east some distance away is its subpeak, the Sachsenstein (915 m), to the south are the Teufelskreise (967 m) and Fichtenkopf (944 m). The Goldlauterberg (866 m) further south marks the transition to the mountain of Großer Finsterberg (944 m).

== Description ==
The mountain is of volcanic origin and consists of porphyry. It is known for the Schneekopf balls (Schneekopfkugel), balls of porphyry (druse) that occur here that form agate in the interior of crystals. They were formed during a volcanic eruption in the Permian. On the northern slopes of the mountain rises the Wilde Gera stream.

From the summit plateau there is a good all round view of other summits in the Thuringian Forest and the Rhön mountains, over the Thuringian Basin as far as the Ettersberg near Weimar and of the winter sports resort of Oberhof. In very good visibility, for example during winter inversion weather conditions, the view extends as far as the Brocken in the Harz Mountains, the Schneeberg and the western Ore Mountains. In addition, the Wilde Gera Viaduct (on the A 71), which has a span of 252 metres - the largest arch bridge in Germany, is also visible.

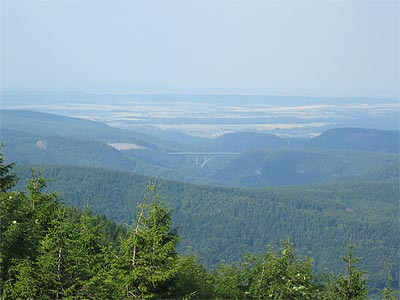
View from the Schneekopf of the Wilde Gera Viaduct (A 71)

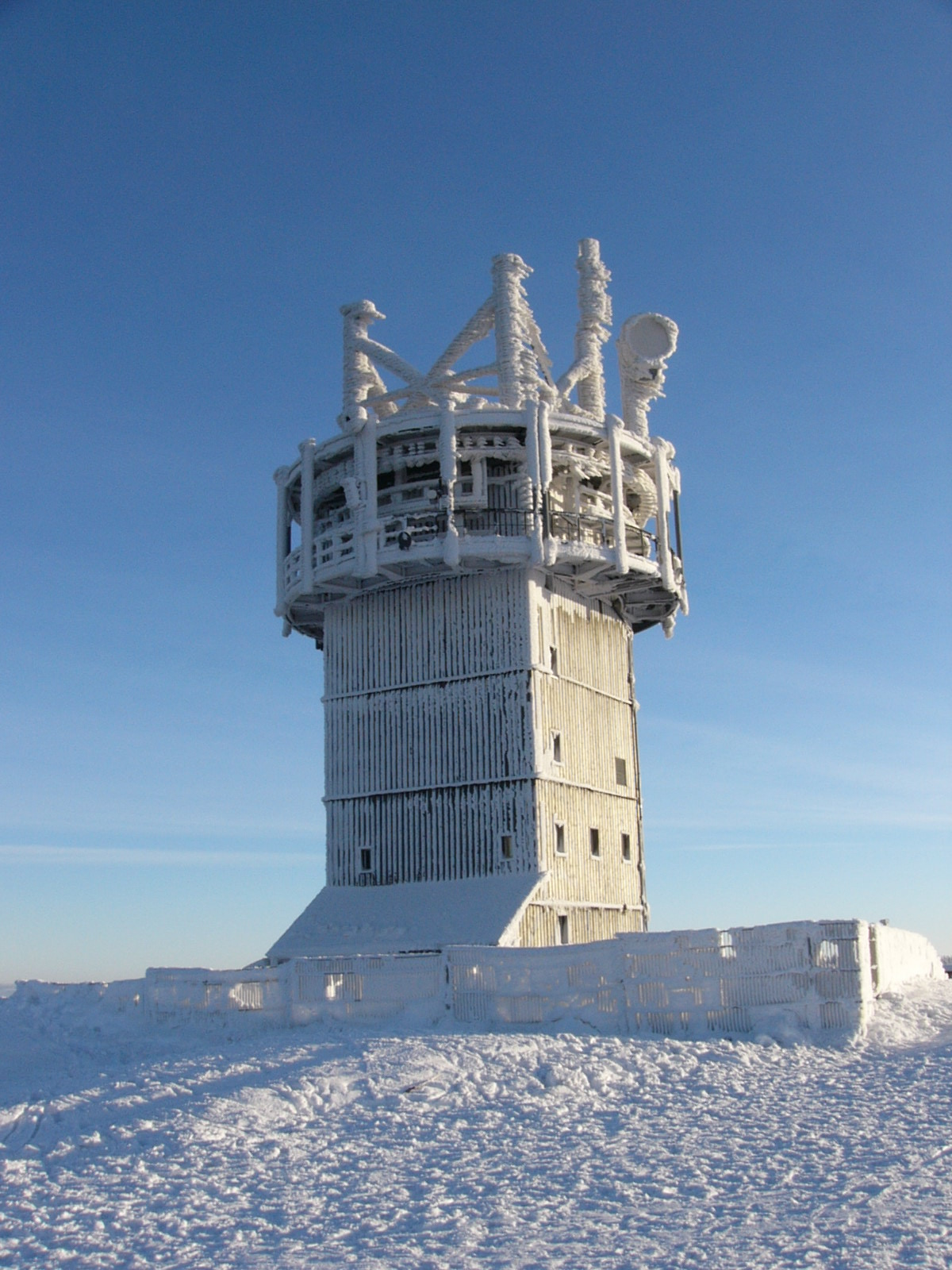
Communications tower on the Schneekopf in winter

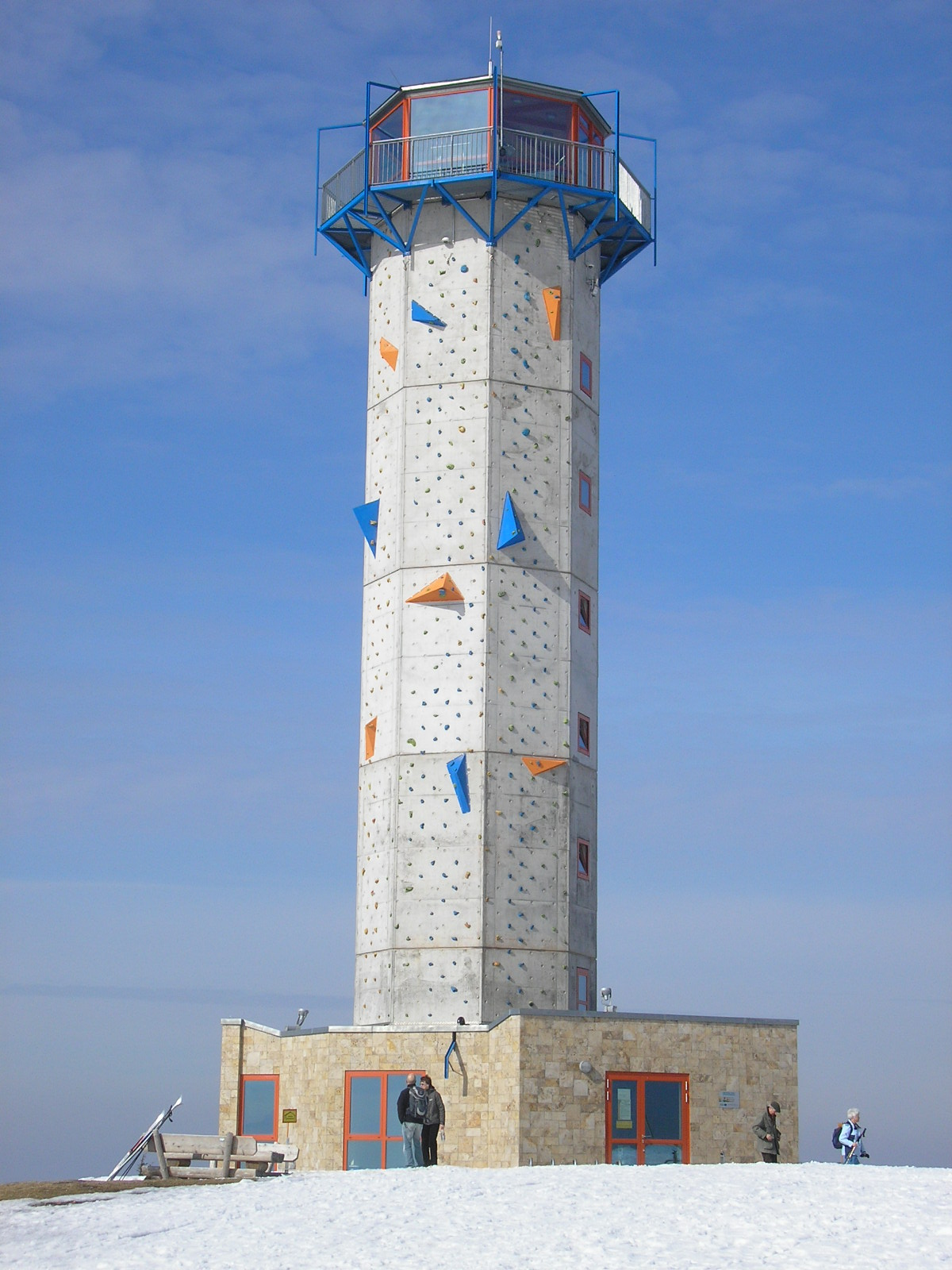
The observation tower on the Schneekopf

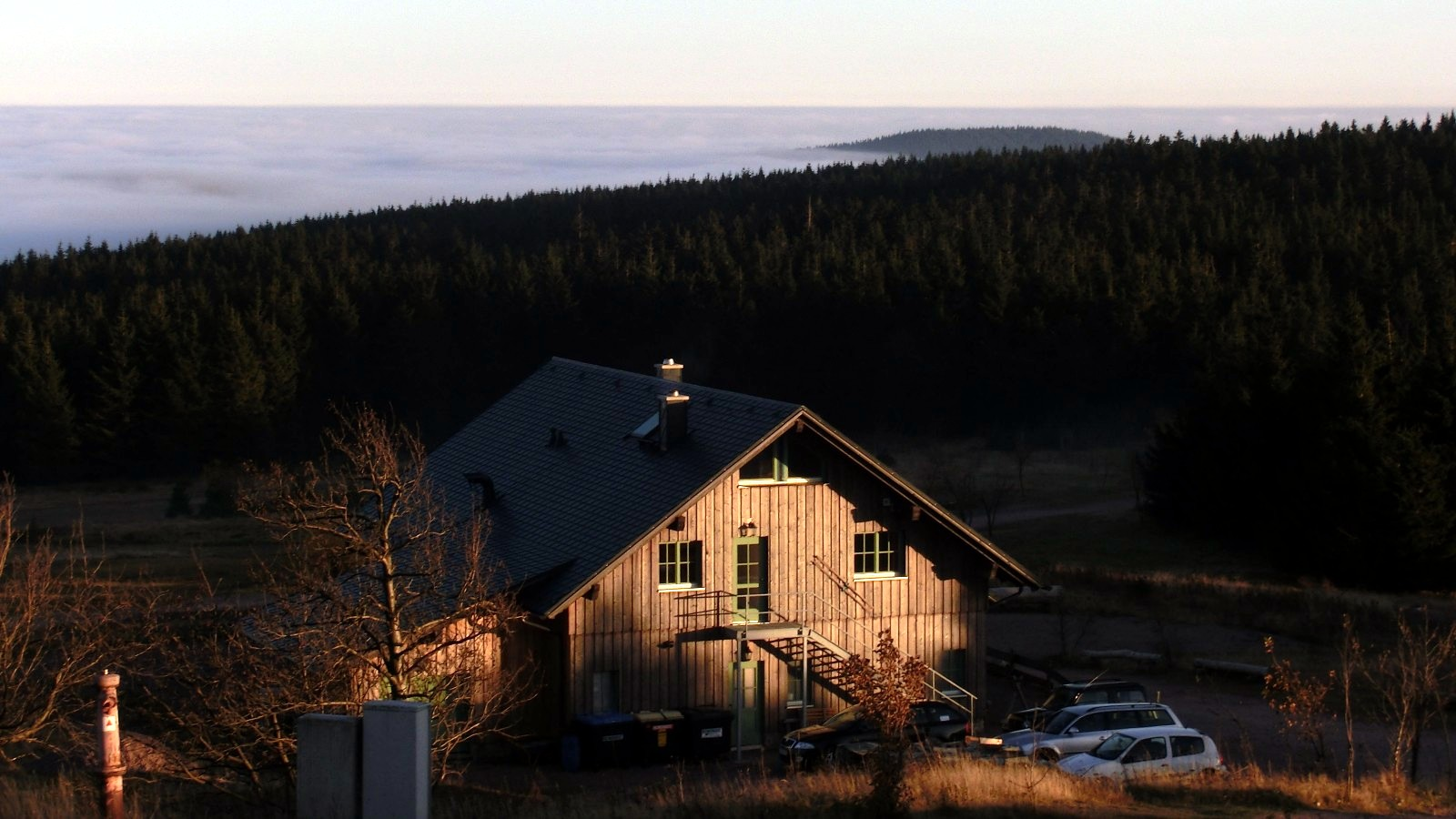
The New Gehlberger Hut

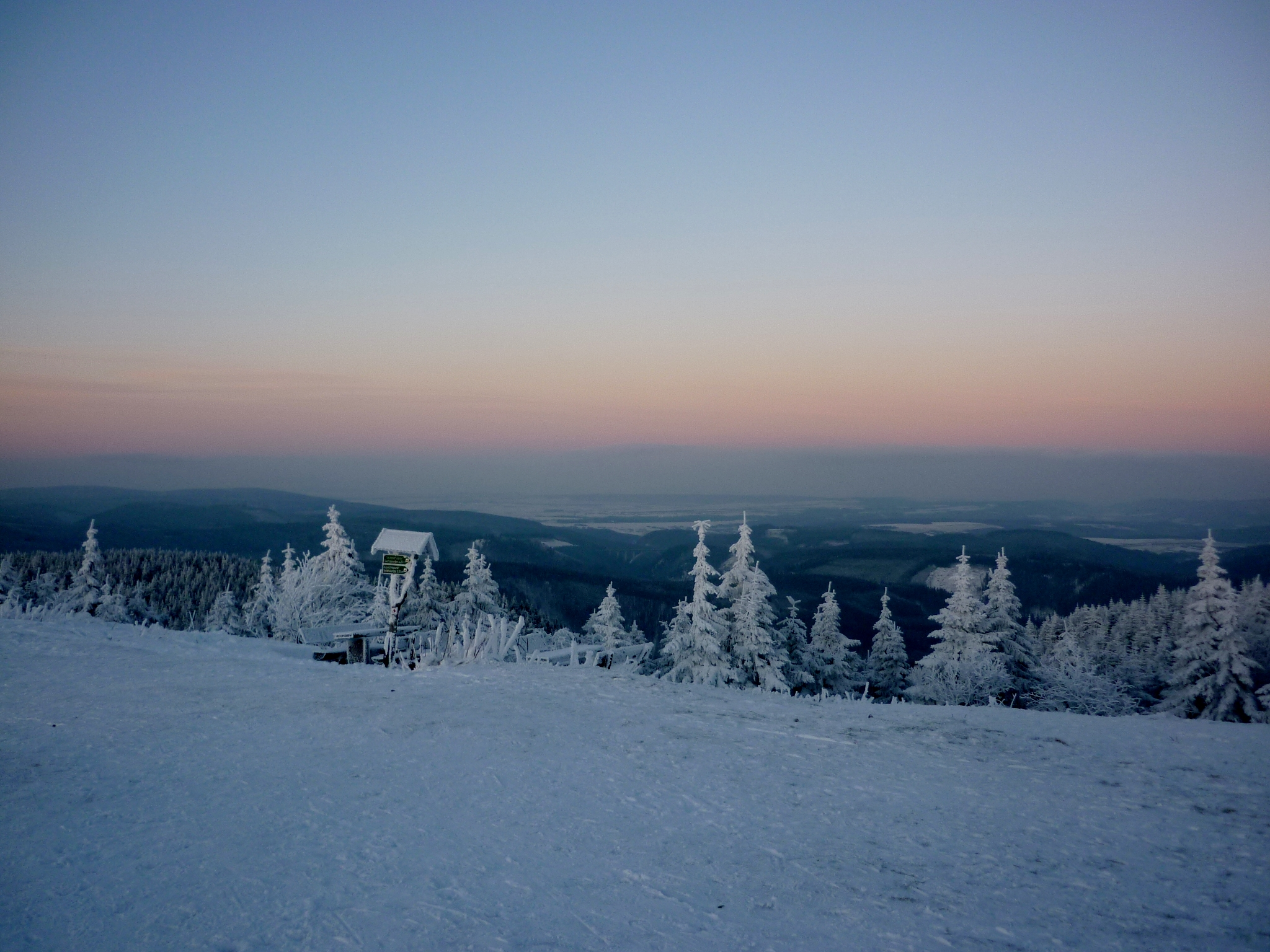
View from the Schneekopf in winter
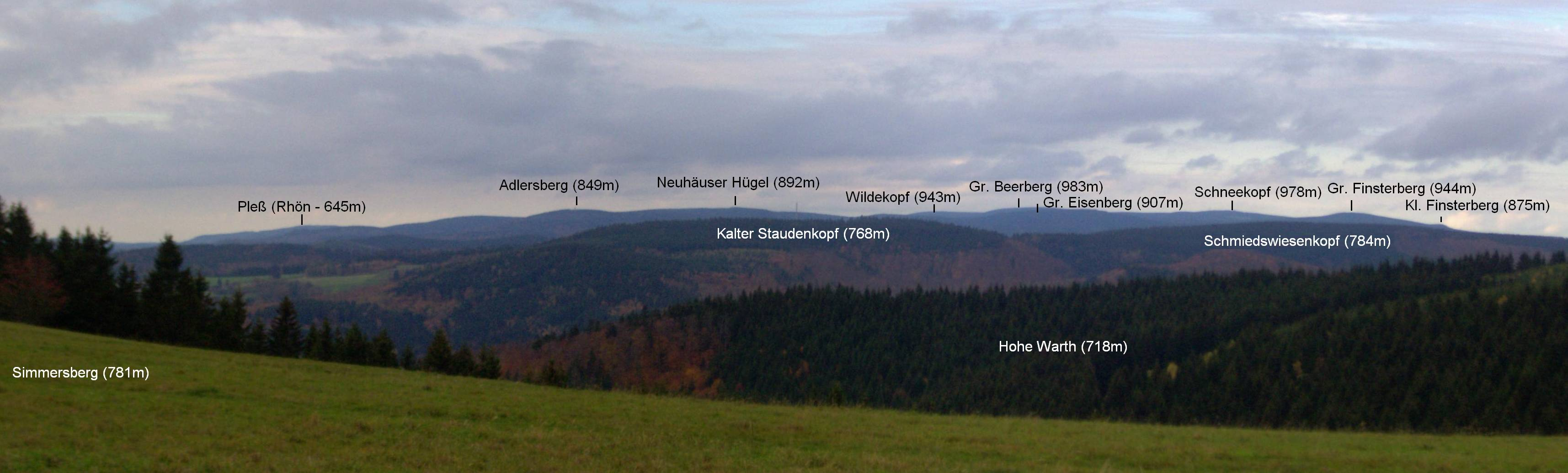
View from the Simmersberg (781 m) of the Schneekopf and the other highest mountains of the Thuringian Forest
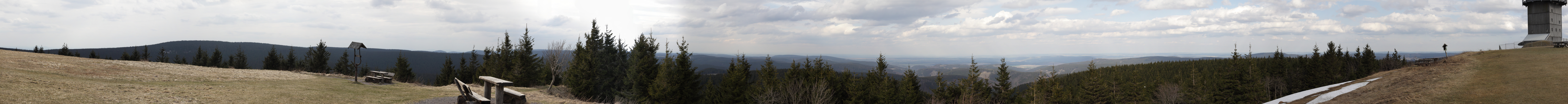
Panorama

== Literature ==
- Ludwig Bechstein: Sagenbuch des Schneekopfs und des Thüringischen Henneberger Landes. Veröffentlichung 1837; Verlag Rockstuhl, Bad Langensalza, Reprint 2009, ISBN 978-3-86777-063-7
