= Schlüsselgrund =

River in Germany

Location
- Country: Germany
- States: Hesse; North Rhine-Westphalia

Physical characteristics
- Mouth
  - location: Calenberger Bach
  - coordinates: 51.460°N 9.171°E
- Length: 8.4 km (5.2 mi)

Basin features
- Progression: Calenberger Bach→ Diemel→ Weser→ North Sea

Schlüsselgrund is a small river of Hesse and North Rhine-Westphalia, Germany. It flows into the Calenberger Bach near Warburg.

== See also ==
- List of rivers of Hesse
