= Beerberg =

Beerberg (lit.: "Berry Mountain") may refer to the following mountains in Germany:

- Großer Beerberg (982 m), a mountain in the Thuringian Forest, Thuringia
- Beerberg (Thuringian Highland) (667 m), in the Thuringian Highland, in the county of Saalfeld-Rudolstadt, Thuringia
- Beerberg (Harz) (658 m), a mountain in the Harz mountains in Lower Saxony
