= Freibach =

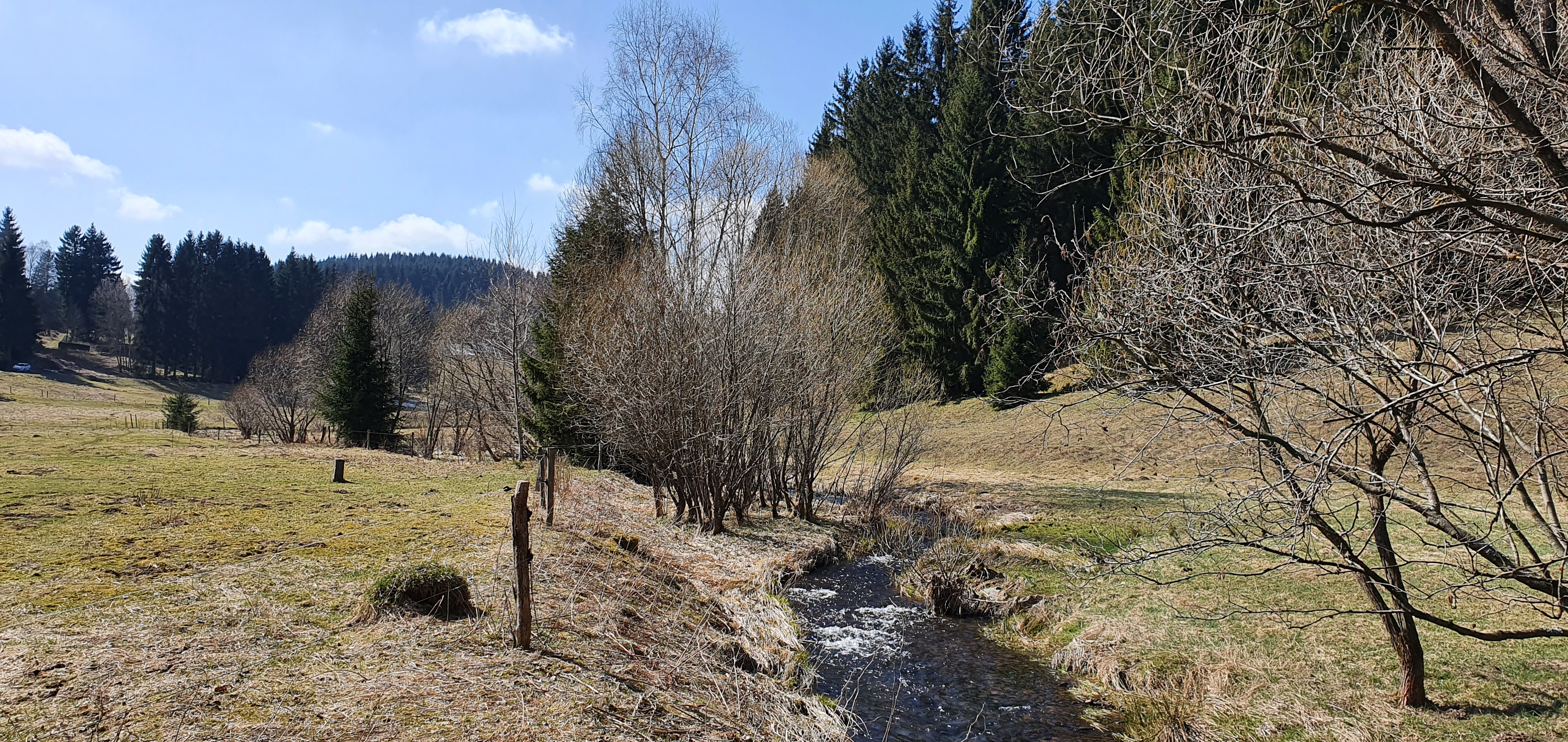

Location
- Country: Germany
- State: Thuringia

Physical characteristics
- Mouth
  - location: Ilm
  - coordinates: 50.6447°N 10.8543°E

Basin features
- Progression: Ilm→ Saale→ Elbe→ North Sea

Freibach is a river of Thuringia, Germany. At its confluence with the Taubach and the Lengwitz near Stützerbach, the Ilm is formed.

== See also ==
- List of rivers of Thuringia
