= Taubach =

Location
- Country: Germany
- State: Thuringia

Physical characteristics
- Mouth
  - location: Ilm
  - coordinates: 50.6433°N 10.8551°E

Basin features
- Progression: Ilm→ Saale→ Elbe→ North Sea

Taubach is a river of Thuringia, Germany. At its confluence with the Freibach and the Lengwitz near Stützerbach, the Ilm is formed.

== See also ==
- List of rivers of Thuringia
