= Calenberger Bach =

River in Germany

- North Rhine-Westphalia

Location
- Country: Germany
- States: Hesse and North Rhine-Westphalia

Physical characteristics
- Mouth
  - location: Diemel
  - coordinates: 51.4879°N 9.1672°E
- Length: 9.1 km (5.7 mi)

Basin features
- Progression: Diemel→ Weser→ North Sea

The Calenberger Bach (also: Fließbach, in its upper course: Ostertalsbach) is a small river of Hesse and North Rhine-Westphalia, Germany.

The Ostertalsbach rises in Hesse, about 2 km southeast of Wettesingen in the municipality of Breuna, on the northern slope of the Malsburg Forest and flows in a northwesterly direction towards the border with North Rhine-Westphalia. It flows into the Diemel on the right bank in Warburg.

== See also ==
- List of rivers of Hesse
- List of rivers of North Rhine-Westphalia
