= Wohlrose =

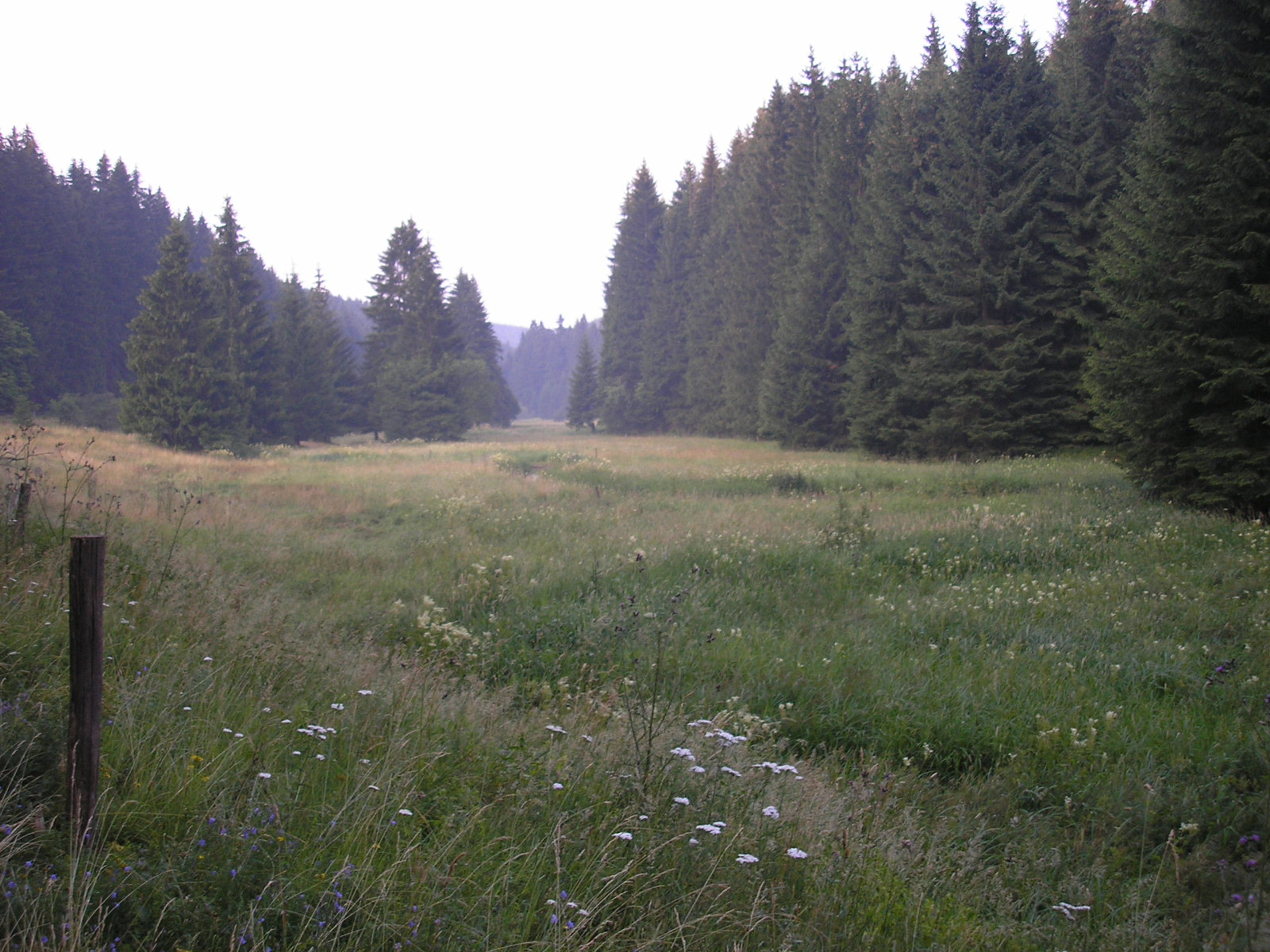

Location
- Country: Germany
- State: Thuringia

Physical characteristics
- Mouth
  - location: Ilm
  - coordinates: 50.6881°N 11.0054°E

Basin features
- Progression: Ilm→ Saale→ Elbe→ North Sea

Wohlrose is a river of Thuringia, Germany. It flows into the Ilm near Wolfsberg.

== See also ==
- List of rivers of Thuringia
