= Breuna =

- Municipality
- Coat of arms

- Location of Breuna within Kassel district
- Interactive map of Breuna
- Location within Germany Location within Hesse
- Coordinates: 51°25′N 09°11′E
- Country: Germany
- State: Hesse
- Admin. region: Kassel
- District: Kassel

Government
  - Mayor (2019–25): Jens Wiegand

Area
  - Total: 40.47 km^{2} (15.63 sq mi)
- Elevation: 292 m (958 ft)

Population (2025-12-31)
  - Total: 3,323
  - Density: 82.11/km^{2} (212.7/sq mi)
- Time zone: UTC+01:00 (CET)
  - Summer (DST): UTC+02:00 (CEST)
- Postal codes: 34479
- Dialling codes: 05693
- Vehicle registration: KS
- Website: www.breuna.de

Breuna is a small municipality in the district of Kassel, in Hesse, Germany. It is situated 24 kilometers northwest of the town of Kassel. Its oldest part is the village of Rhöda, first mentioned in the early ninth century.

== Twin towns — sister cities ==
Breuna is twinned with:

- Gehlberg, Germany
- Predappio, Italy
