= Großer Beerberg =

Highest point of Thuringian Forest, Germany

Grosser Beerberg
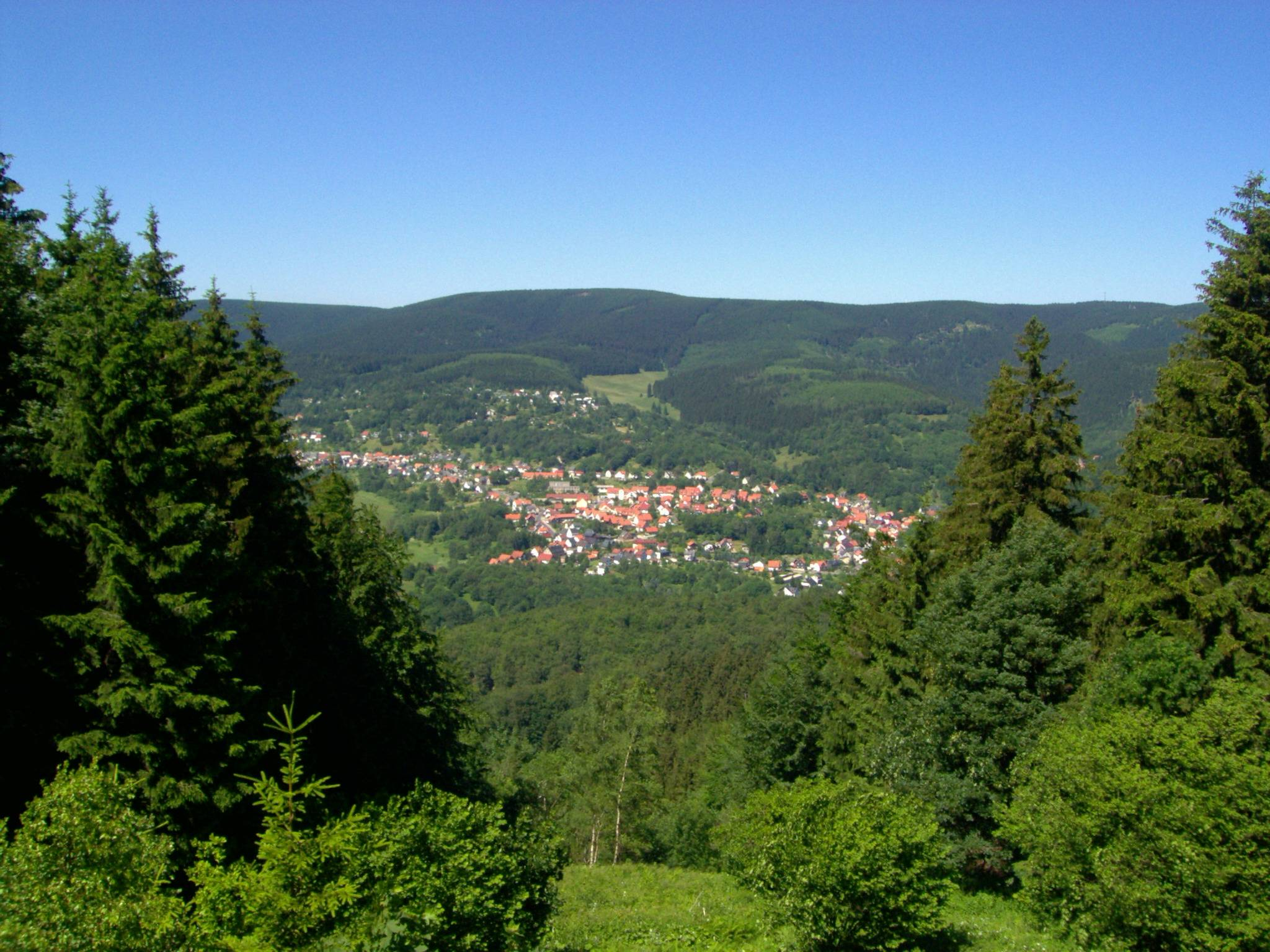
- View of Großer Beerberg from the south; in the foreground is Suhl-Goldlauter

Highest point
- Elevation: 982.9 m (3,225 ft)
- Prominence: 396 m (1,299 ft)
- Isolation: 102.65 km (63.78 mi) to Ochsenkopf
- Coordinates: 50°39′34″N 10°44′46″E

Naming
- Pronunciation: German: [ˈɡʁoːsɐ ˈbeːɐ̯bɛɐ̯k]

Geography
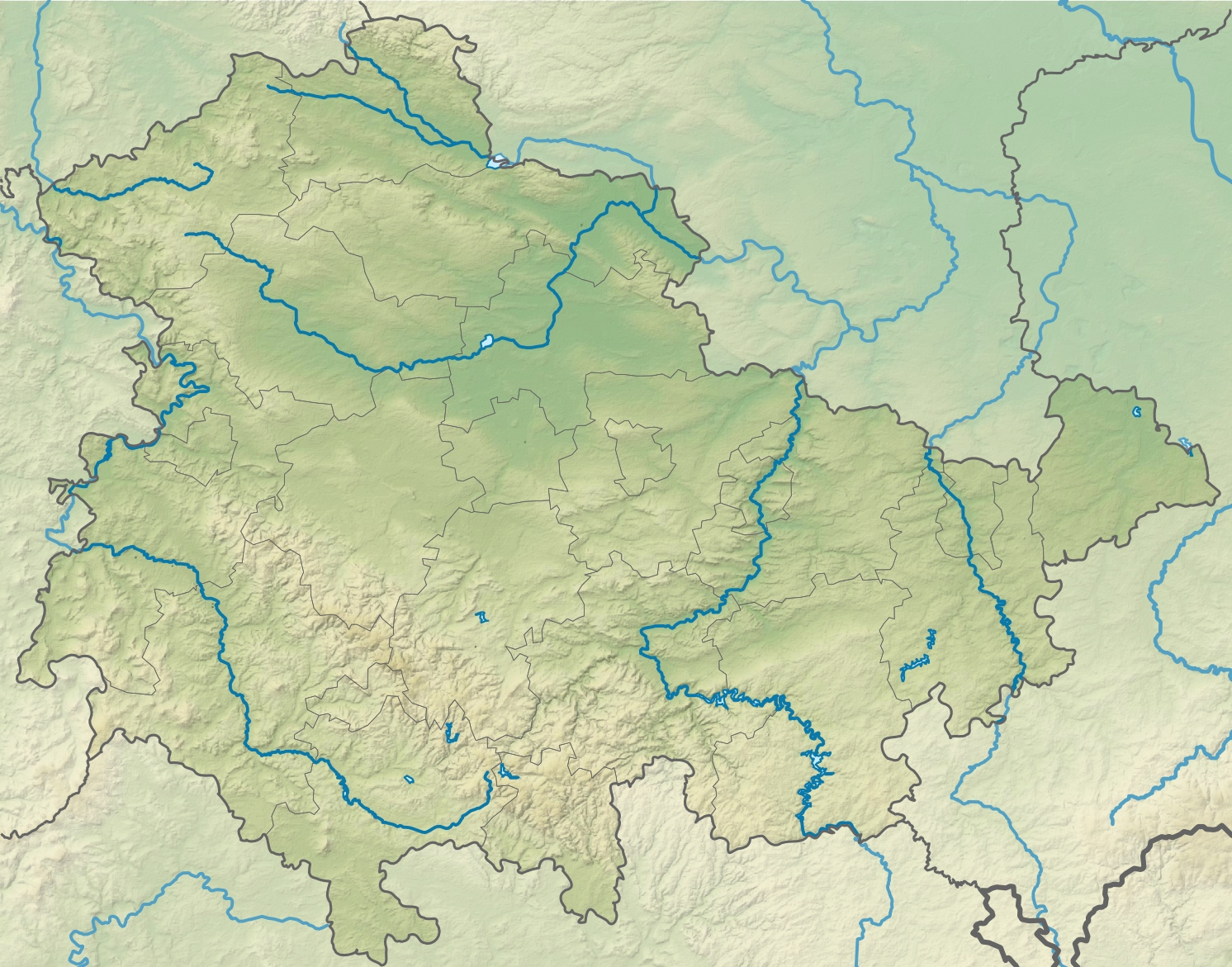
- Location within Thuringia
- Location: Thuringia, Germany
- Parent range: Thuringian Forest

The Großer Beerberg (German pronunciation: [ˈɡʁoːsɐ ˈbeːɐ̯ˌbɛʁk]) is a mountain, 982.9 m above sea level (NHN), whose summit is the highest point in the Thuringian Forest and the state of Thuringia. It is located between the three villages of Heidersbach, Goldlauter and Gehlberg in the borough of Suhl. The mountain is made of rhyolite (quartz porphry) that was formed through volcanic processes in the Rotliegendes rock of the Oberhof Formation, about 280 million years ago, and which was uplifted over the surrounding sediments to form a butte.

Between the summit of the Beerberg and that of its eastern neighbour, the Schneekopf (978 m), the second highest mountain of Thuringia, is a 60-metre-deep col. To the west is the Sommerbachskopf (941 m).

On the summit of Beerberg is one of the few moorlands of the Thuringian Forest. Until the end of the 1980s there was an observation tower on the mountain. A few years ago, a small platform was again established below the summit at Plänckners Aussicht, which offers an outstanding view to the south and southwest.

The section of the Rennsteig long-distance path between Oberhof and Schmücke runs across the mountain. The nearest town is Suhl.

== See also ==
- List of mountains in Thuringia
- List of mountain and hill ranges in Germany
