= Gehlberg =

- Ortsteil of Suhl
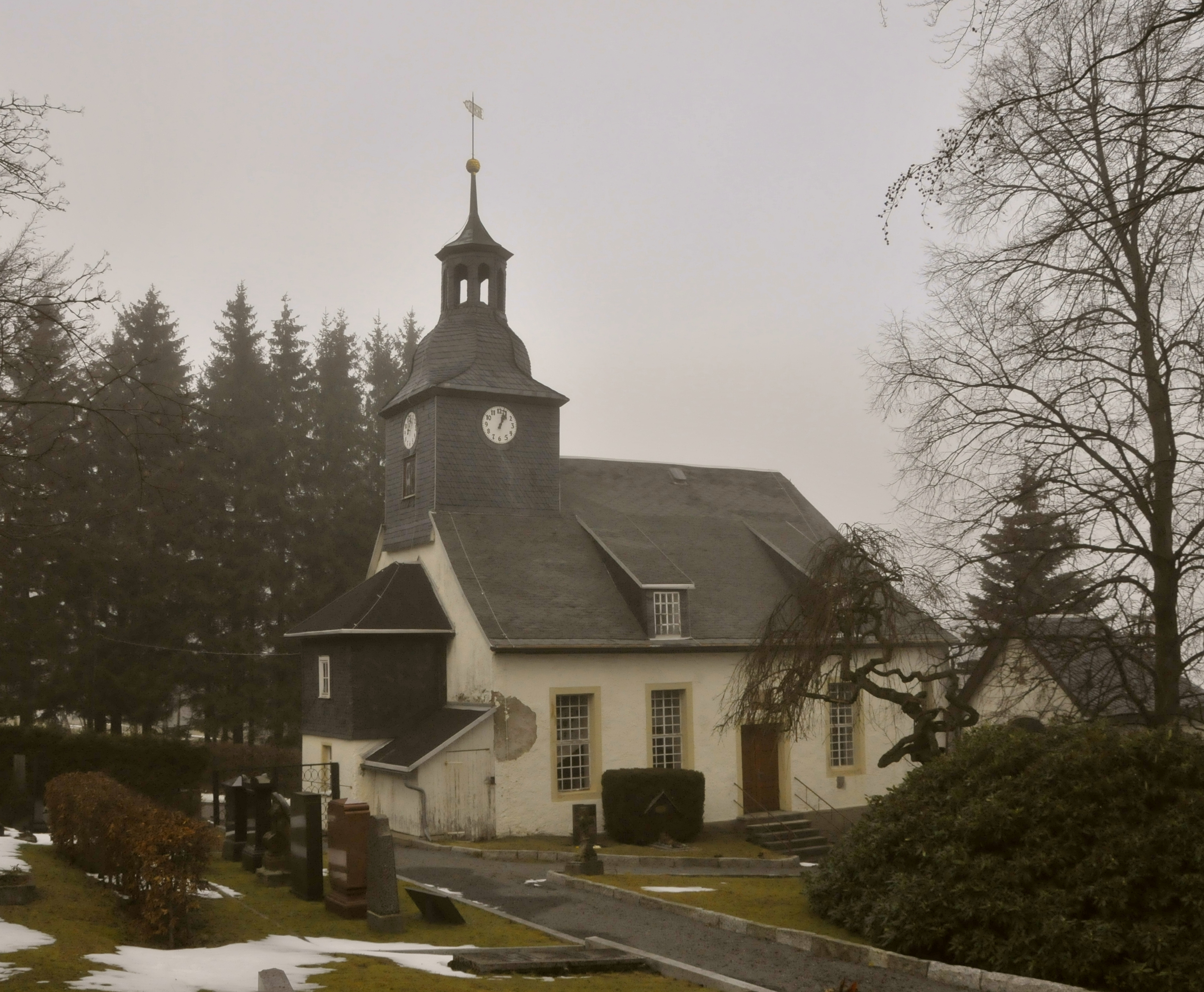

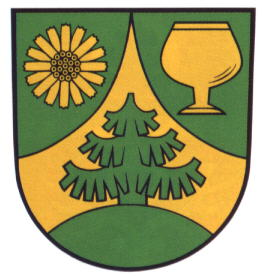
- Coat of arms

- Location of Gehlberg within Suhl
- Interactive map of Gehlberg
- Location within Germany Location within Thuringia
- Coordinates: 50°40′53″N 10°47′26″E
- Country: Germany
- State: Thuringia
- Town: Suhl

Area
  - Total: 20.43 km^{2} (7.89 sq mi)
- Elevation: 720 m (2,360 ft)

Population (2017-12-31)
  - Total: 502
  - Density: 24.6/km^{2} (63.6/sq mi)
- Time zone: UTC+01:00 (CET)
  - Summer (DST): UTC+02:00 (CEST)
- Postal codes: 98559
- Dialling codes: 036845
- Website: www.gehlberg.de

Gehlberg (German pronunciation: [ˈɡeːlbɛʁk]) is a village and a former municipality in Thuringia, Germany. Formerly in the district Ilm-Kreis, it is part of the town Suhl since January 2019.

== Climate ==
Climate data for Schmücke: 938m (1991−2020)
Month	Jan	Feb	Mar	Apr	May	Jun	Jul	Aug	Sep	Oct	Nov	Dec	Year
Mean daily maximum °C (°F)	−0.8 (30.6)	0.0 (32.0)	3.6 (38.5)	8.9 (48.0)	13.3 (55.9)	16.4 (61.5)	18.5 (65.3)	18.5 (65.3)	13.7 (56.7)	8.5 (47.3)	3.5 (38.3)	0.2 (32.4)	8.7 (47.7)
Daily mean °C (°F)	−2.8 (27.0)	−2.3 (27.9)	0.6 (33.1)	5.0 (41.0)	9.2 (48.6)	12.3 (54.1)	14.3 (57.7)	14.3 (57.7)	10.2 (50.4)	5.8 (42.4)	1.3 (34.3)	−1.8 (28.8)	5.5 (41.9)
Mean daily minimum °C (°F)	−4.7 (23.5)	−4.4 (24.1)	−1.9 (28.6)	1.8 (35.2)	5.6 (42.1)	8.7 (47.7)	10.9 (51.6)	11.0 (51.8)	7.4 (45.3)	3.6 (38.5)	−0.5 (31.1)	−3.7 (25.3)	2.8 (37.1)
Average precipitation mm (inches)	133.6 (5.26)	104.1 (4.10)	106.0 (4.17)	73.4 (2.89)	96.5 (3.80)	90.9 (3.58)	129.9 (5.11)	96.2 (3.79)	111.0 (4.37)	110.9 (4.37)	119.7 (4.71)	142.5 (5.61)	1,314.7 (51.76)
Source: NOAA

== Twin towns — sister cities ==
Gehlberg is twinned with:

- Breuna, Germany
