= Stützerbach =

- Ortsteil of Ilmenau
- Coat of arms
- Interactive map of Stützerbach
- Location within Germany Location within Thuringia
- Coordinates: 50°38′6″N 10°51′44″E
- Country: Germany
- State: Thuringia
- District: Ilm-Kreis
- Town: Ilmenau

Area
  - Total: 11.37 km^{2} (4.39 sq mi)
- Elevation: 620 m (2,030 ft)

Population (2017-12-31)
  - Total: 1,364
  - Density: 120.0/km^{2} (310.7/sq mi)
- Time zone: UTC+01:00 (CET)
  - Summer (DST): UTC+02:00 (CEST)
- Postal codes: 98714
- Dialling codes: 036784
- Vehicle registration: IK
- Website: www.stuetzerbach.de

Stützerbach (German pronunciation: [ˈʃtʏtsɐˌbax]) is a village and a former municipality in the Ilm-Kreis district, in Thuringia, Germany. Since 1 January 2019, it is part of the town Ilmenau.

== History ==
Within the German Empire (1871-1918), part of Stützerbach belonged to the Prussian Province of Saxony and part to the Grand Duchy of Saxe-Weimar-Eisenach.
