= Ilm (Thuringia) =

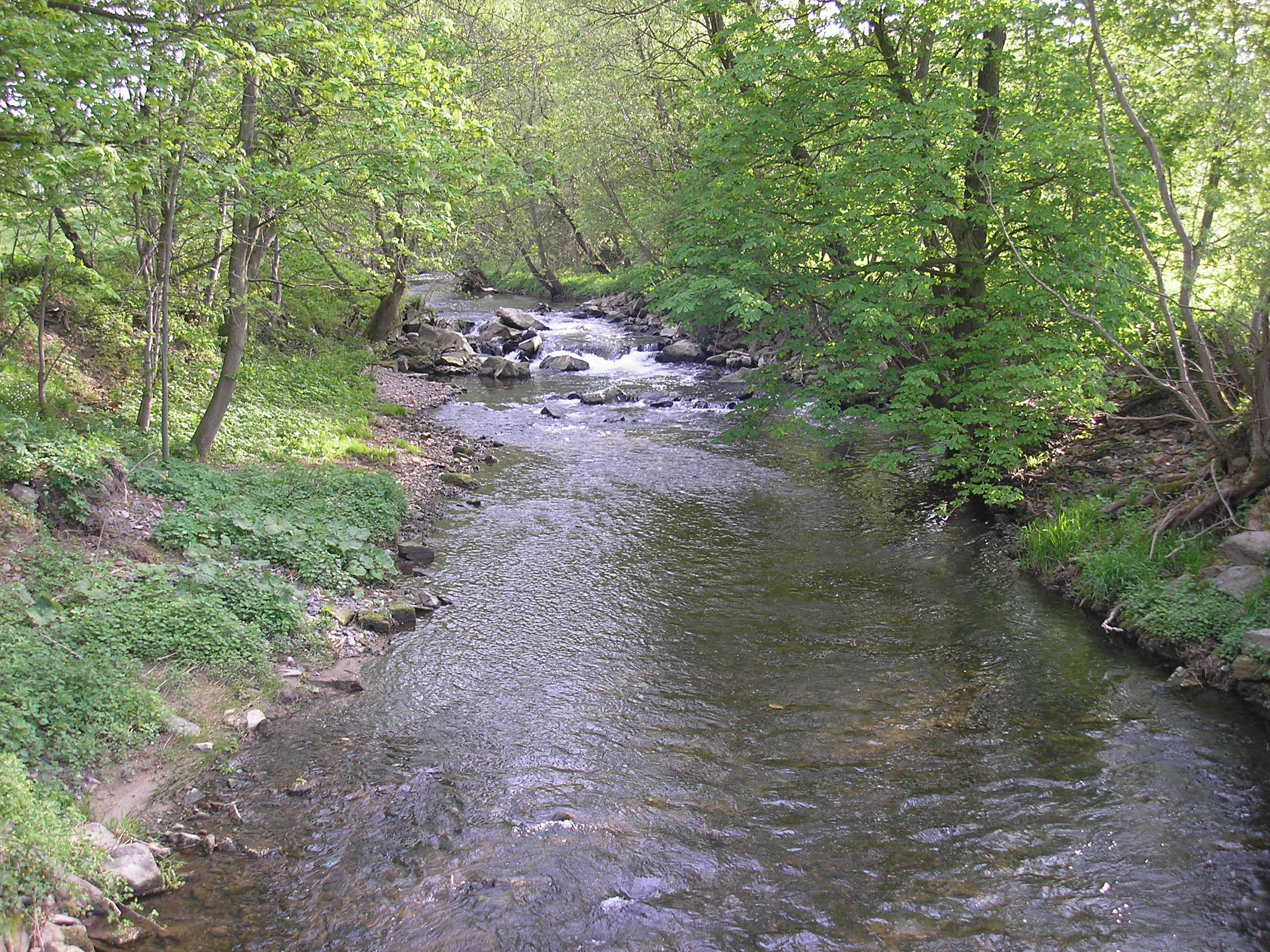
- The Ilm near Langewiesen

Location
- Country: Germany

Physical characteristics
- Source
  - location: Thuringian Forest
- Mouth
  - location: Saale
  - coordinates: 51°6′17″N 11°40′7″E
- Length: 129 km (80 mi)
- Basin size: 1,043 km^{2} (403 sq mi)

Basin features
- Progression: Saale→ Elbe→ North Sea

The Ilm (German pronunciation: [ɪlm]) is a 128.7 kilometers (80.0 mi) long river in Thuringia, in central Germany. It is a left tributary of the Saale, into which it flows in Großheringen near Bad Kösen.

Towns along the Ilm are Ilmenau, Stadtilm, Kranichfeld, Bad Berka, Weimar, Apolda and Bad Sulza.

In the valley of Ilm river runs the federal motorway 87 from Ilmenau to Leipzig and two railways: the Thuringian Railway between Großheringen and Weimar and the Weimar–Kranichfeld railway. Part of the Nuremberg–Erfurt high-speed railway also runs through the upper part of the valley near Ilmenau.

To the south of Weimar, there is a 48-hectare landscape public park along the river.

== See also ==
- List of rivers of Thuringia
