= Finkenbach (Laxbach) =

River in Germany

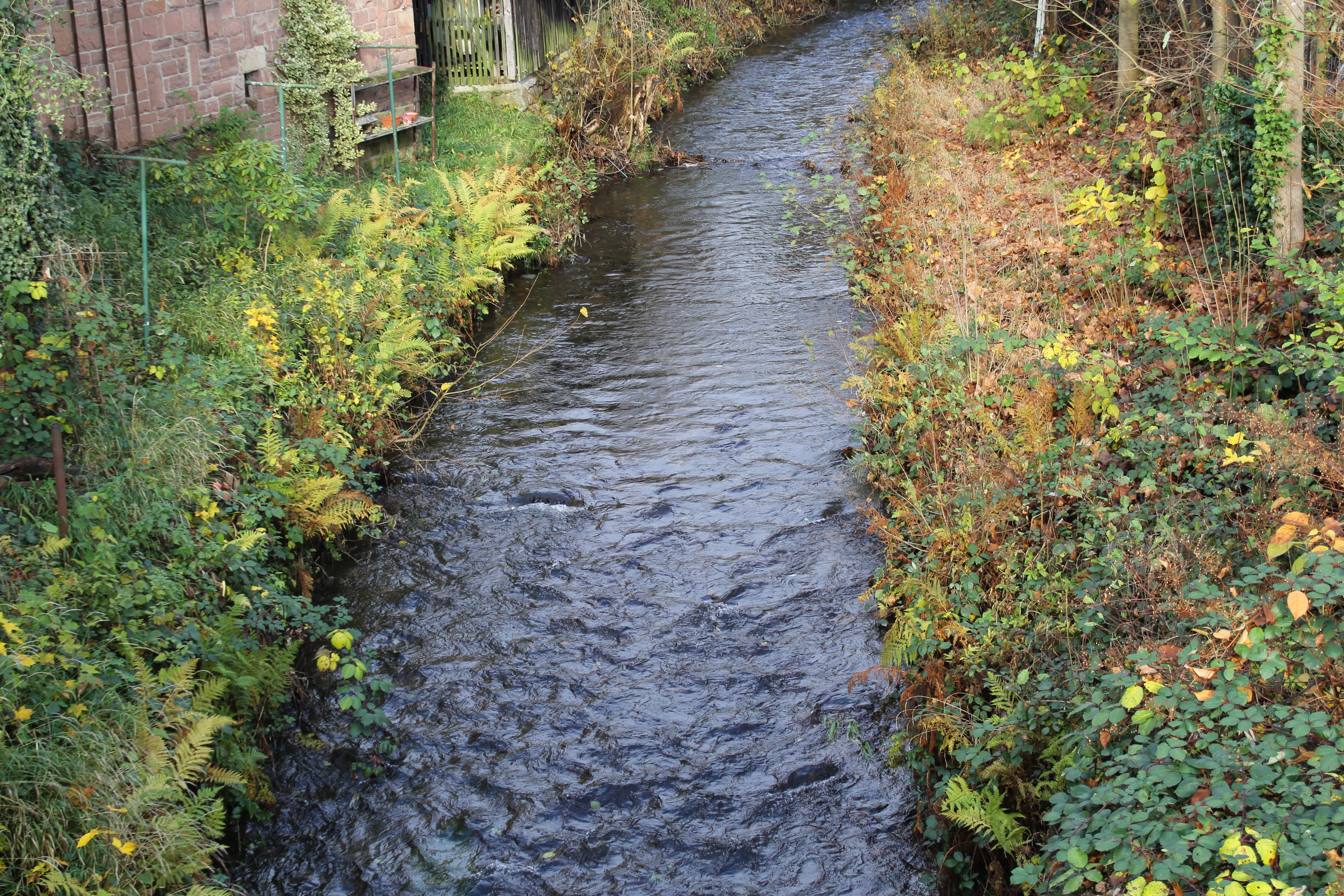

Location
- Country: Germany
- States: Hesse and Baden-Württemberg

Physical characteristics
- Mouth
  - location: Laxbach
  - coordinates: 49.4475°N 8.8942°E
- Length: 22.1 km (13.7 mi)

Basin features
- Progression: Laxbach→ Neckar→ Rhine→ North Sea

Finkenbach (German pronunciation: [ˈfɪŋkn̩bax]) is a river of Hesse and Baden-Württemberg, Germany. At its confluence with the Ulfenbach in Hirschhorn, the Laxbach is formed.

== See also ==
- List of rivers of Hesse
- List of rivers of Baden-Württemberg
