= Ulfenbach =

River in Germany

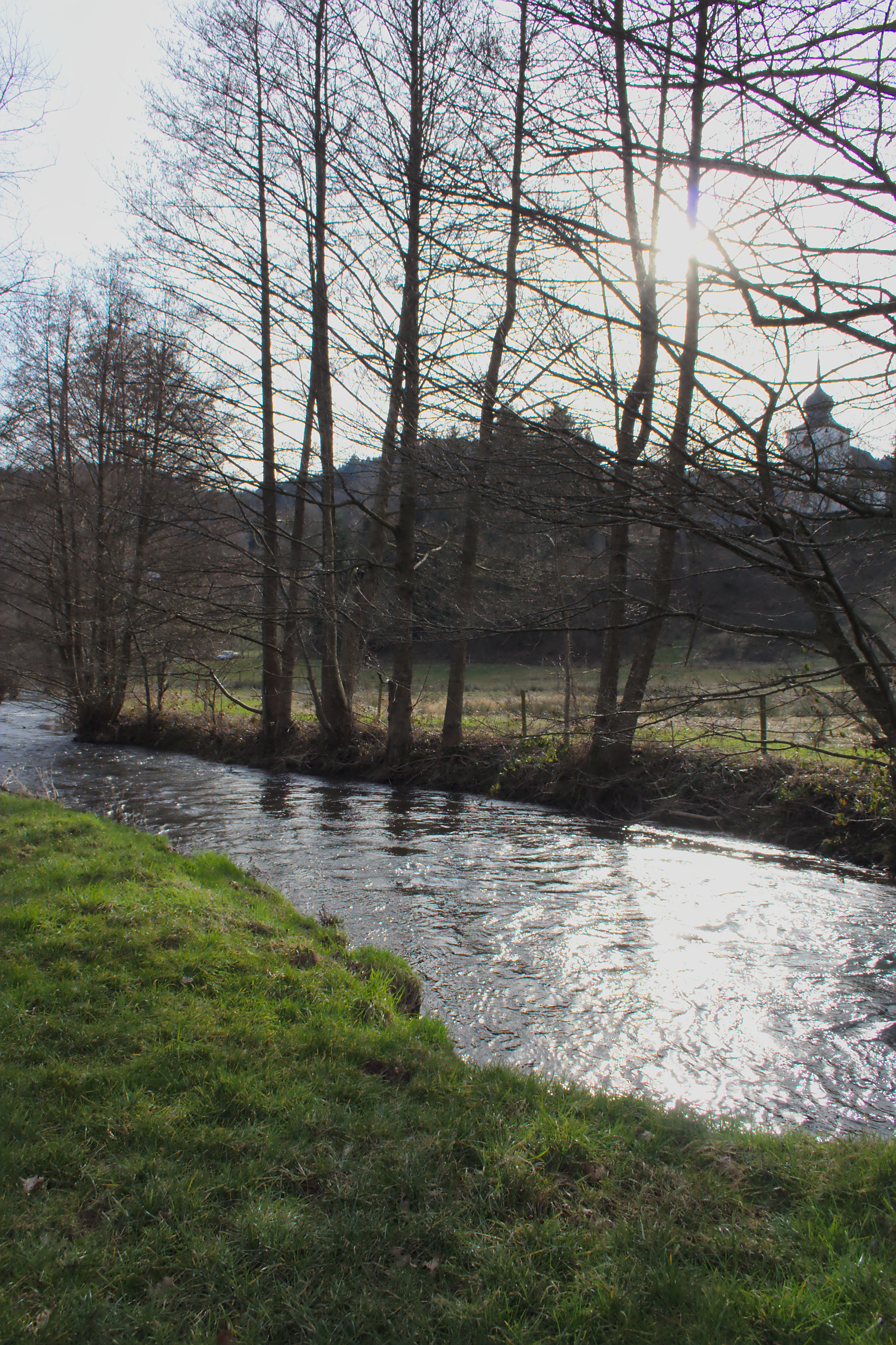

Location
- Country: Germany
- States: Hesse; Baden-Württemberg

Physical characteristics
- Mouth
  - location: Laxbach
  - coordinates: 49.4475°N 8.8942°E
- Length: 29.8 km (18.5 mi)

Basin features
- Progression: Laxbach→ Neckar→ Rhine→ North Sea

Ulfenbach (German pronunciation: [ˈʊlfn̩bax]) is a river of Hesse and Baden-Württemberg, Germany. At its confluence with the Finkenbach in Hirschhorn, the Laxbach is formed.

== See also ==
- List of rivers of Baden-Württemberg
