= Laxbach =

River in Germany

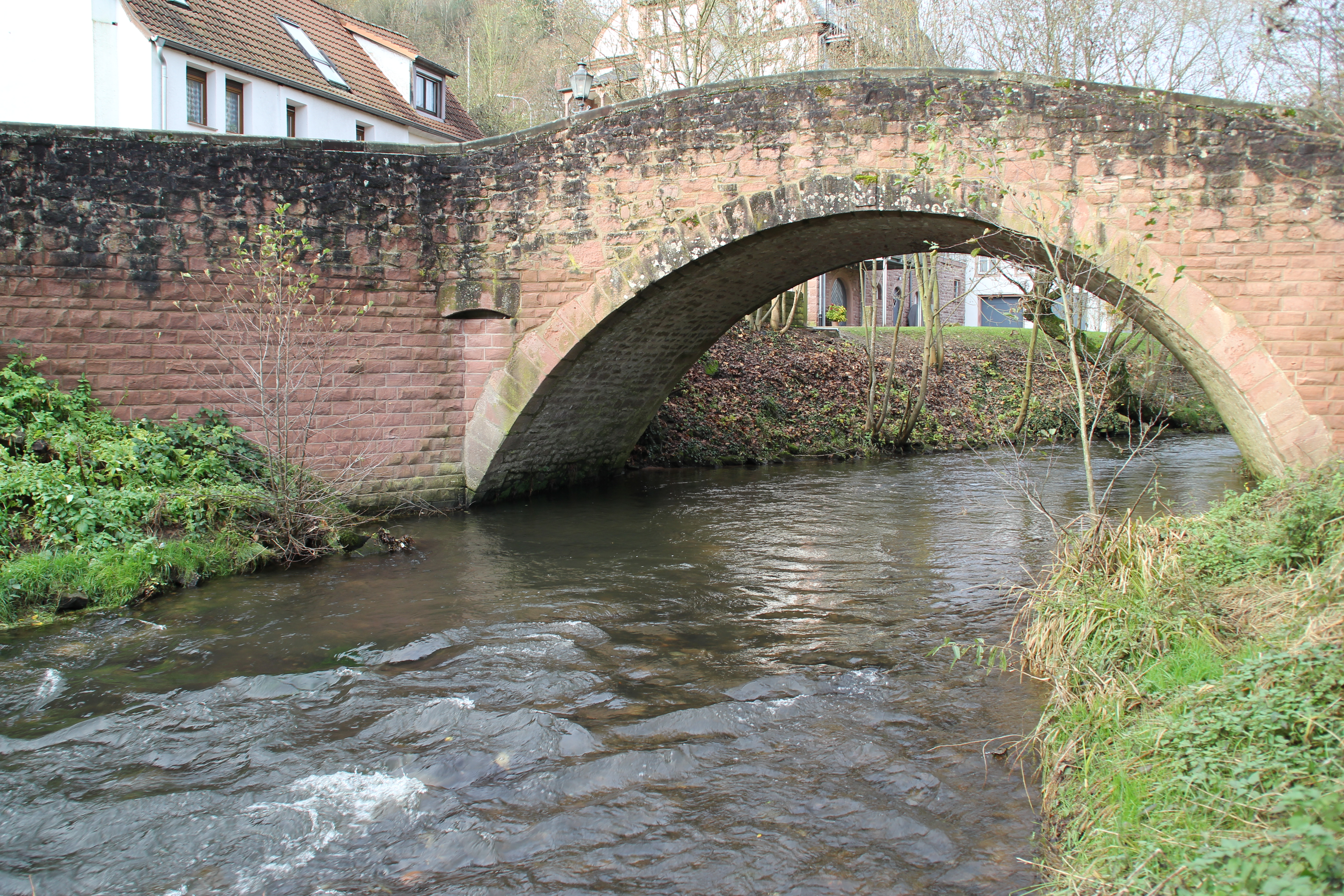

Location
- Country: Germany
- State: Hesse

Physical characteristics
- Mouth
  - location: Neckar
  - coordinates: 49.4424°N 8.8992°E
- Length: 0.7 km (0.43 mi)
- Basin size: 170 km^{2} (66 sq mi)

Basin features
- Progression: Neckar→ Rhine→ North Sea

Laxbach (German pronunciation: [ˈlaksbax]) is a short river of Hesse, Germany. It is formed in Hirschhorn at the confluence of the rivers Ulfenbach and Finkenbach. After 0.7 km it discharges into the Neckar.

== See also ==
- List of rivers of Hesse
