= Carmelite Monastery Church of the Annunciation =

- Karmeliter-Klosterkirche Mariä Verkündigung
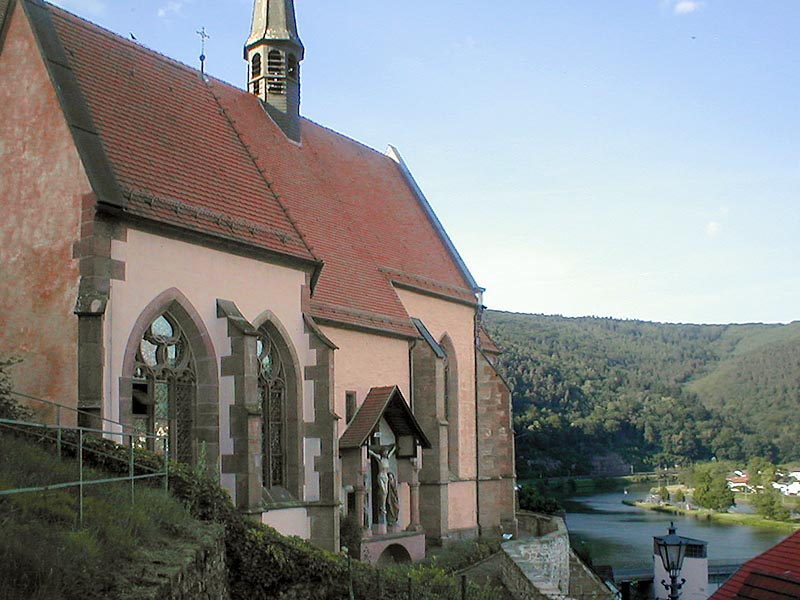

Religion
- Affiliation: Roman Catholic
- Diocese: Bergstraße
- Festival: The Annunciation
- Year consecrated: 1406 / 1910
- Status: Active

Location
- Municipality: Hirschhorn am Neckar
- State: Hesse
- Country: Germany
- Interactive map of Carmelite Monastery Church of the Annunciation
- Coordinates: 49°26′57″N 8°53′58″E

Architecture
- Architect: Heinrich Isenmenger of Wimpfen (?)
- Style: Late Gothic
- Founder: Hans V, Iland, Conrad, and Eberhard von Hirschhorn
- Funded by: Hirschhorn family
- Inscriptions: Memorials to the Hirschhorn family

The Carmelite Monastery Church of the Annunciation (German: Karmeliter-Klosterkirche Mariä Verkündigung, Pfälzisch: Kloschder Härschhorn) at Hirschhorn in Hesse, Germany, dates from 1406, when the Lord of Hirschhorn established a Carmelite monastery there. Its architectural style is late Gothic. In 1803, the monastery was dissolved, and the church deconsecrated. The church fell into ruin, but it has since been rebuilt, and it was reconsecrated in 1910.

== History ==
Hirschhorn is a small town in the Bergstraße district of Hesse, Germany. By 1270, it was ruled by the noble Hirschhorn family, whose seat was in Hirschhorn Castle above the town. In 1405, Pope Innocent VII granted their request to found a Carmelite monastery. In 1406, Hans V von Hirschhorn, together with his second wife Iland (née von Dhaun) and his brothers Conrad and Eberhard, did so. The fact that Conrad was a senior church official (de:Domherr, a type of canon) at both Mainz and Speyer Cathedrals may have been relevant to both request and grant.

The monastery and its church, dedicated to the Annunciation, lie directly below Hirschhorn Castle. In addition to the monastery and church, the parishes of Eppingen and Hessloch (Note: It is unclear whether this Hessloch is Dittelsheim-Heßloch or Wiesbaden-Heßloch, or some other place altogether.) were given to the Carmelites for their financial security. The Hirschhorn family made further donations. In 1511, an extension was built on the south wall of the nave of the church; in 1515, this became St Anne's Chapel, dedicated to the mother of Saint Mary.

The Lords of Hirschhorn seem later to have converted to Lutheranism, because between 1522 and 1529 they installed a Protestant pastor in the church, and demanded that the Carmelites not wear the monkly habits of their order. In 1530, the Carmelites were taken under the protection of Emperor Charles V. They were tolerated by the Hirschhorns until 1543, when Hans IX dissolved the monastery. After his death in 1569, his widow Anna (née Göbel von Ravensburg) lived in it as her dower house. The Carmelites complained to the Emperor and to the Reichskammergericht, and decisions were given in their favour in 1571 and 1596. (Note: Identification of the relevant Emperor depends on the dates of the complaint and of the decision. Maximilian II was Holy Roman Emperor 1564-1576 and Rudolf II 1576-1612.) The Hirschhorns ignored those decisions, and demonstrated their power in around 1590 by replacing the altar in St Anne's Chapel with a family tomb.

During the Thirty Years' War (1618-1648), Frederick III (Lord of Hirschhorn 1628-1632), foreseeing victory by the Catholic powers, built a new Protestant church (the modern Marktkirche ("Market Church")) in Hirschhorn. The appointment as governor of the Palatinate of Heinrich von Metternich, a Catholic, justified his caution. In 1629, Frederick had to return monastery and church to the Carmelites. After his death, Hirschhorn fell under the rule of the Archbishop-Elector of Mainz, who re-established the monastery as a centre for re-catholicisation of the neighbouring communities and parishes.

From 1636 to 1732, the church served as the Catholic parish church in Hirschhorn. In 1689, a new high altar was installed; it was renovated in the middle of the 18th century. In 1799, some of the organ pipes were damaged by gunfire and had to be repaired. (Note: The identity of those who damaged the organ pipes does not seem to have been recorded. In 1799, the French invaded the Palatinate, and the damage may have been caused by the fighting that ensued.)

In 1803, the monastery was dissolved, the church was closed, and the movables were sold at auction. In 1810, the civil authorities in Darmstadt considered demolishing the church because of the cost of its upkeep. On 17 March 1812, Grand Duke Louis I gave the church to the town of Hirschhorn, which also considered its demolition. In 1840, a further auction of church contents took place, after which only the exterior walls remained. In 1859, the community decided to preserve and renovate the church; in 1860, a temporary roof was constructed. In 1886, the town gave the church to the Catholic community, who undertook a comprehensive renovation. This was completed in 1910; and on 8 August, it was consecrated as a parish church. In 1912, some restoration work was performed on the old mural paintings. In 1969-1970, parts of the ceiling were renovated and brought back closer to their original condition. From 1998 on, further renovation has taken place.

== Description ==
The church has a single nave, whose roof supports a small central tower. The chancel is to the east, and the keystone of its vaulted roof bears the coat of arms of the lords of Hirschhorn. On the west wall is a carved sandstone lattice in Gothic style. It originally divided the body of the church from the chancel (i.e. it served as a rood screen), but was moved to its present location no later than 1618. The high altar is neo-Gothic.

St Anne's Chapel, on the south side, has its own gable roof and two windows with stone tracery. The ceiling vaults bear the coats of arms of Hirschhorn and Handschuhsheim, and a portrait of Eucharius von Hirschhorn.

The church still contains some memorials to the Lords of Hirschhorn. These include: a memorial plaque to Hans V (co-founder, died 18 November 1426) and his son Philipp I (died 16 August 1436) on the south wall of the choir; the double-tombs (presumably of husband and wife) of Melchior (died 1476) and Kunigunde (née von Oberstein, died 1457), and of Hans VIII (died 1513) and Irmgard (née von Handschuhsheim, died 1496), which bear their life-size effigies; under the rood loft (between nave and chancel), the tombs of three sons of Hans VIII, Philipp II (died 1522), Engelhard III (died 1529) and Georg (died 1543); and the tomb of Hans IX (son of Engelhard III, died 1569), which bears his effigy in full armour.

== Gallery ==
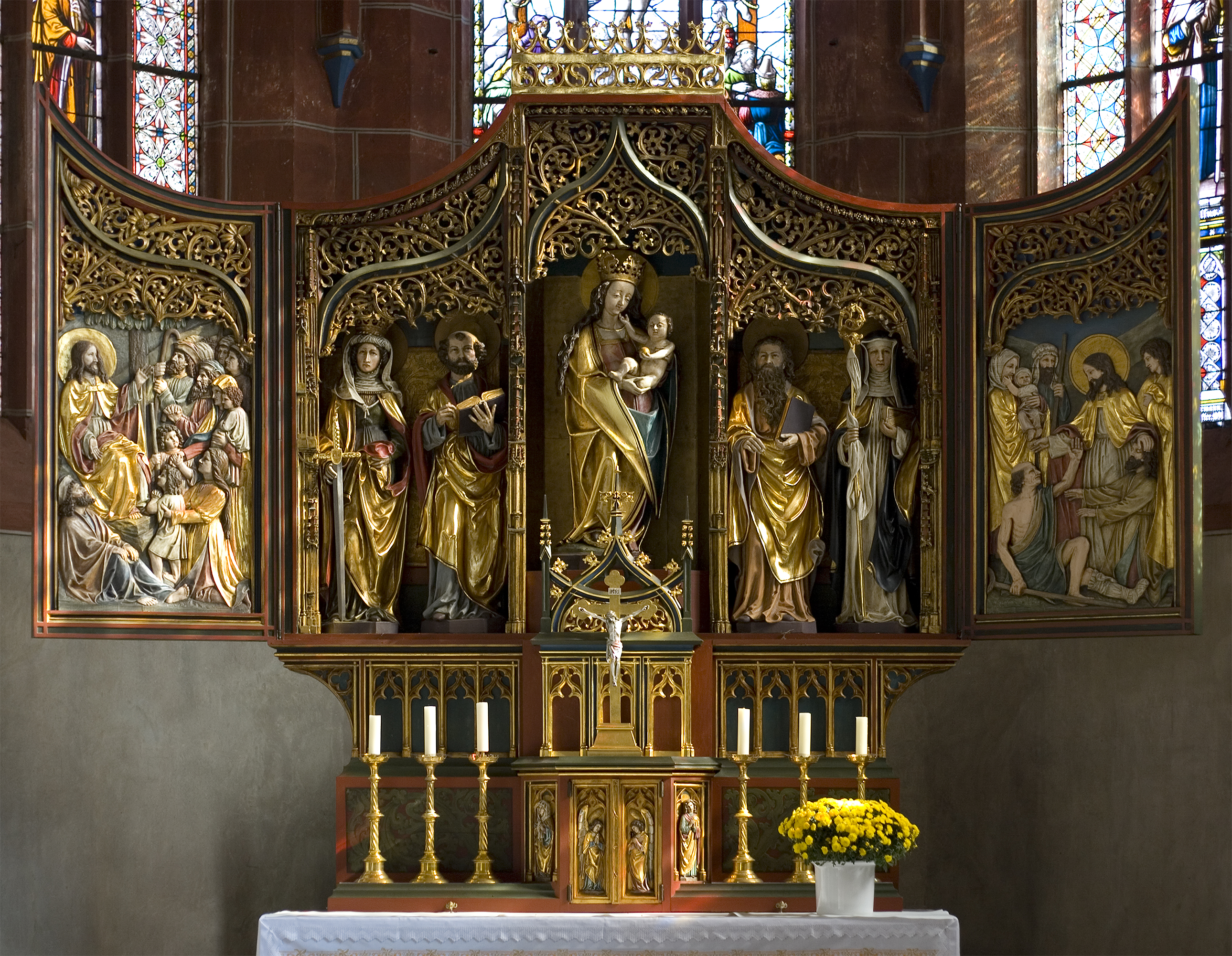
The high altar

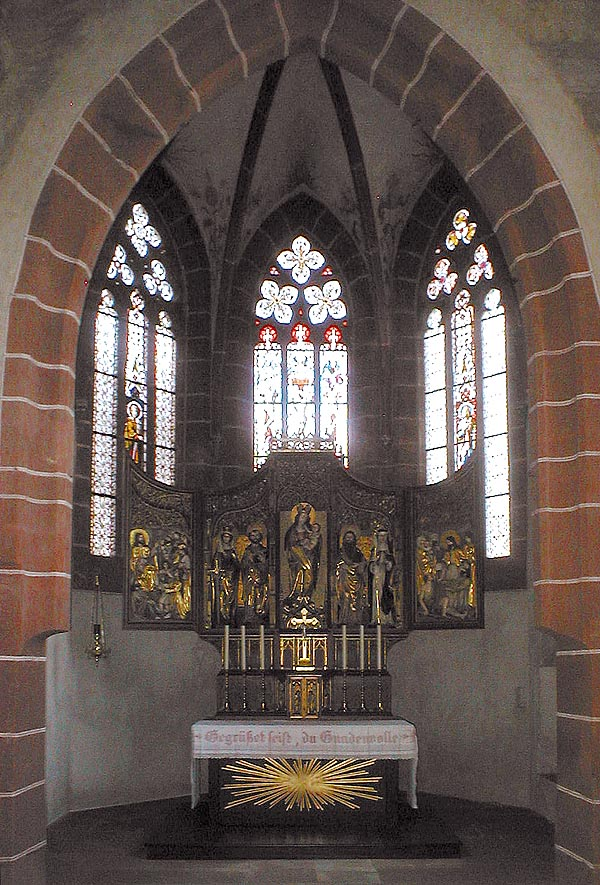
The high altar, viewed from the nave

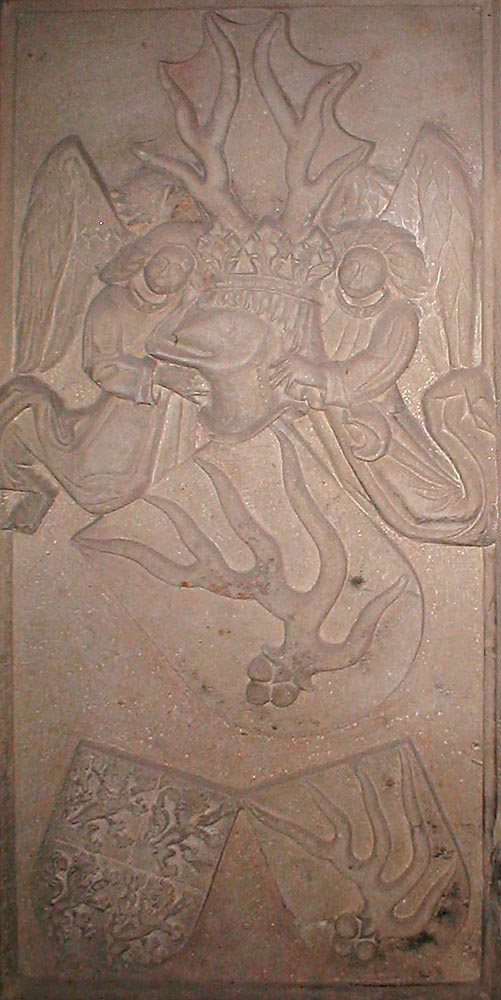
The dual memorial of Hans V and Philipp I von Hirschhorn
