= Hirschhorn (Neckar) =

- Town
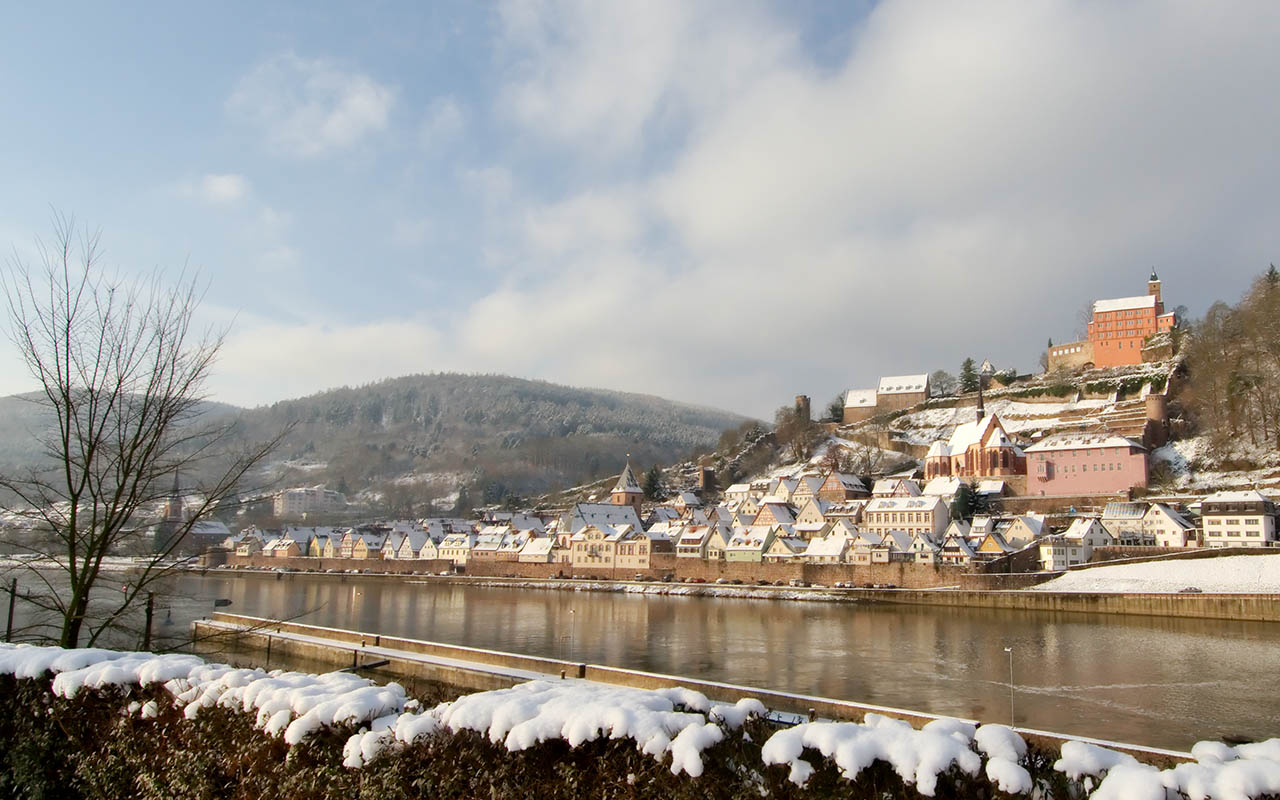

- Coat of arms

- Location of Hirschhorn within Bergstraße district
- Interactive map of Hirschhorn
- Location within Germany Location within Hesse
- Coordinates: 49°27′N 8°54′E
- Country: Germany
- State: Hesse
- Admin. region: Darmstadt
- District: Bergstraße
- Subdivisions: 5

Government
  - Mayor (2022–28): Martin Hölz

Area
  - Total: 30.85 km^{2} (11.91 sq mi)
- Elevation: 126 m (413 ft)

Population (2025-12-31)
  - Total: 3,460
  - Density: 112/km^{2} (290/sq mi)
- Time zone: UTC+01:00 (CET)
  - Summer (DST): UTC+02:00 (CEST)
- Postal codes: 69434, 64757 (Unter-Hainbrunn), 69412 (Igelsbach)
- Dialling codes: 06272, 06271, 06275
- Vehicle registration: HP
- Website: www.hirschhorn.de

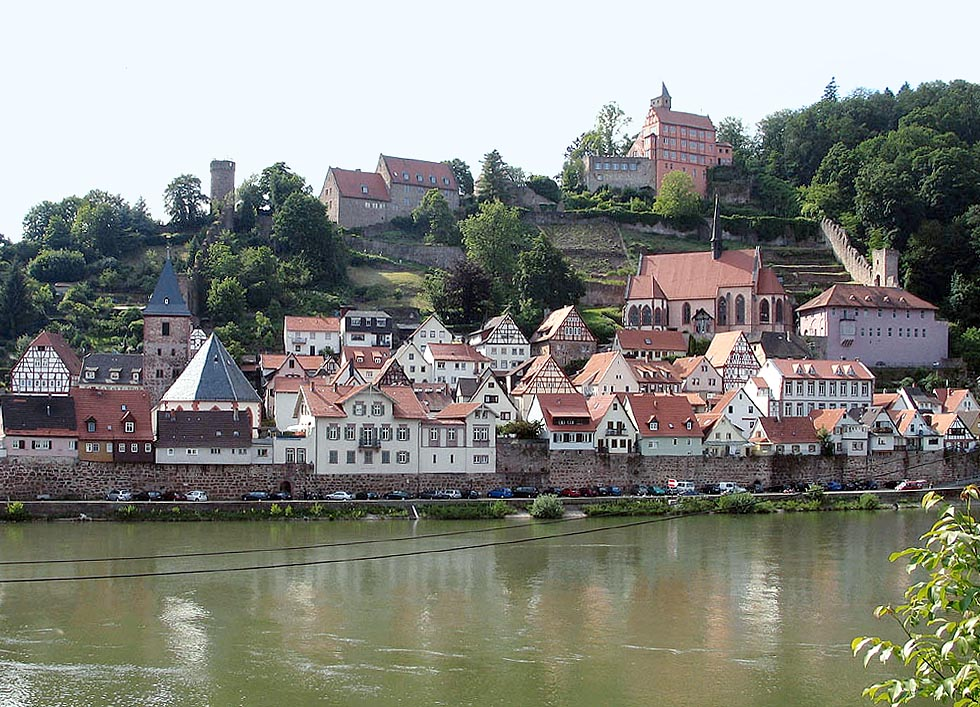
View of the historic town centre and the castle from the south bank of the Neckar

Hirschhorn (Neckar) (German pronunciation: [ˈhɪʁʃhɔʁn]) is a small town in the Bergstraße district of Hesse, Germany, and is known as "The Pearl of the Neckar valley”. Hirschhorn is a climatic health resort situated in the Geo-Naturpark Bergstraße-Odenwald.

== Geography ==
=== Location ===
Hirschhorn is situated at a horseshoe bend of the River Neckar, roughly 19 km east of Heidelberg. The Neckar has dug its way through the wooded hills of the Odenwald here. Hirschhorn stretches along the right bank of the Neckar, i.e. north of the river. Ersheim, Hirschhorn's oldest part, has the distinction, however, of being the only bit of Hesse south of the Neckar. In Hirschhorn, two northern tributaries, the Ulfenbach and the Finkenbach, join to become the Laxbach before flowing into the Neckar.

=== Neighbouring communities ===
In the north, Hirschhorn borders the villages of Heddesbach (Rhein-Neckar-Kreis, Baden-Württemberg) and Brombach (part of Eberbach), and on the parish of Rothenberg (Odenwaldkreis). The town of Eberbach (east of Hirschhorn) is also in the Rhein-Neckar-Kreis and therefore in Baden-Württemberg. South of Hirschhorn there is the parish of Schoenbrunn (Rhein-Neckar-Kreis); the town of Neckarsteinach is towards the south-west, and to the west of Hirschhorn there is the town of Schoenau (Rhein-Neckar-Kreis), with the forest district of Michelbuch in between, which has its own peculiar status and does not belong to any village or town.

=== Constituent communities ===
Apart from the town itself, the following villages belong to Hirschhorn:

- Langenthal (in the Ulfenbach valley)
- Unter-Hainbrunn (in the Finkenbach valley)
- Hessisch-Igelsbach (Badisch-Igelsbach is part of Eberbach)

== History ==
=== Ersheim ===
The first document in which the settlement of Ersheim is mentioned is the Lorsch codex in an endowment dated 773 (Lorsch Documents, no. 2624). This settlement, which in 1023 under the name of Erasam belonged to the property of a monastery affiliated to Lorsch, St Michael's on Heiligenberg near Heidelberg, was one of the oldest in the Neckar valley. Whereas almost the whole of the surrounding area came into the possession of the diocese of Worms in the 11th century, Ersheim together with the nearby village of Ramsau downriver on the right bank remained an exclave of Lorsch. From here several villages were founded in forest clearings from the 12th century onward, among them Weidenau, Unter-Hainbrunn, Igelsbach and Krautlach, but they were largely abandoned again afterwards.

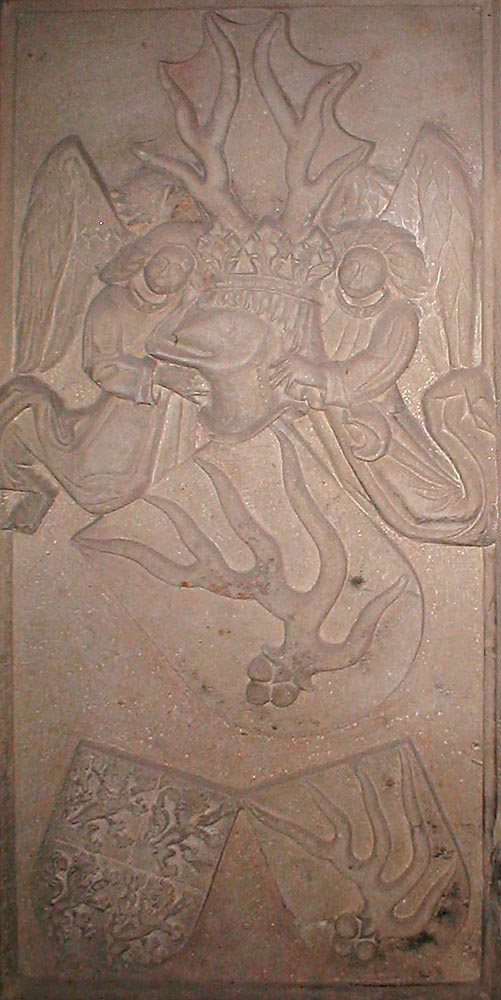
Grave plate of Hans V of Hirschhorn, local lord about 1400

=== Foundation of the town by the Lords of Hirschhorn ===
The town of Hirschhorn southwest of Ersheim on the right bank of the Neckar derives its name from its founders, the Lords of Hirschhorn, whose coat of arms shows a stag's antler. The first Lord of Hirschhorn was probably a son of a knight of Steinach. Hirschhorn Castle (Burg Hirschhorn) was built about 1250/60 on land given as a fief by Lorsch Abbey, which since 1232 was in the possession of the Archbishop of Mainz. Engelhard I (1329–61) increased his influence and his dominions considerably through Imperial fiefdoms and land mortgaged to him in return for loans. His son, Engelhard II, waged various feuds and was placed under the Imperial ban; Engelhard II's sons, however, managed to enlarge the family's estates again.
Hirschhorn (Hirtzhorn) was surrounded by a town wall after the brothers Hans V, Albrecht and Eberhard of Hirschhorn had received its town charter from King Wenceslaus in 1391. When Elector Palatine Ruprecht III was elected King in 1400, Hans V of Hirschhorn was employed in Imperial service as an adviser, diplomat, and financier. His diplomatic missions also took him to the English court. King Henry V of England held Hans in such high esteem that he granted him a lifelong annual payment of 100 marks.
Hirschhorn was endowed with the right to have a weekly market in 1404. The oldest town seal dates from 25 July 1406. It was in that year that Hans V, together with his brothers, founded the Carmelite monastery with its Church of the Annunciation on the slope below the castle. The first enlargement of the town (Vorstadt) is mentioned as early as 1413. The inhabitants of the neighbouring villages sought protection within the precincts of the fortified town, so Ersheim, Ramsau, Krautlach and Weidenau were soon abandoned. For centuries Ersheim only consisted of the Ziegelhütte ("brick plant", built in 1553) and the church compound.
Between 1522 and 1529, the Knights of Hirschhorn converted to Protestantism. They quarrelled with the Carmelites and closed their monastery down in 1543. In 1555 the town was hit by the Plague, and in 1556 a devastating fire destroyed nearly the whole of the oldest part of the town (Hinterstädtchen). Extensive flooding aggravated by thawing ice occurred in 1565.

=== Decline in the Thirty Years' War ===
While Hirschhorn was not involved in the German Peasants' War, major changes were brought about by the Thirty Years' War. After the Lords of Hirschhorn had died out with the demise of Frederic III in September 1632 - he had fled to Heilbronn in order to escape the turmoil of the war - the castle and the town passed to the archdiocese of Mainz. The Plague of 1635 decimated the population. After the end of Swedish occupation in 1636, Hirschhorn was mortgaged to an official at the court of the Elector of Cologne, Rudolf Raitz von Frentz. The population, which had already been afflicted by the war, had to suffer exploitation and impoverishment. The Carmelites moved back into their monastery. Around the middle of the seventeenth century, Hirschhorn's population only amounted to a fifth (c. 200) of what it had been at the beginning of that century. Following the Peace of Westphalia (1648), new inhabitants from Palatinate, the Electorates of Mainz and Trier, Lorraine, Tyrol and Switzerland settled in the town. Between 1676 and 1699, Hirschhorn was mortgaged to Westphalian baron Johann Wilhelm von der Reck, but in 1700 direct rule by the Electorate of Mainz was established. Hirschhorn was now the seat of an Amtskellerei (an administrative unit) within the higher administrative unit (Oberamt) of Starkenburg with its centre in Heppenheim.

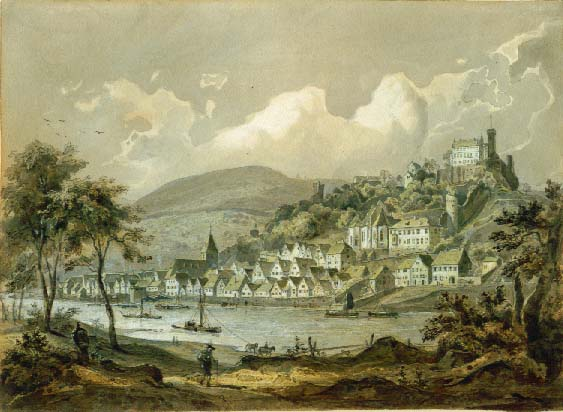
Hirschhorn 1848

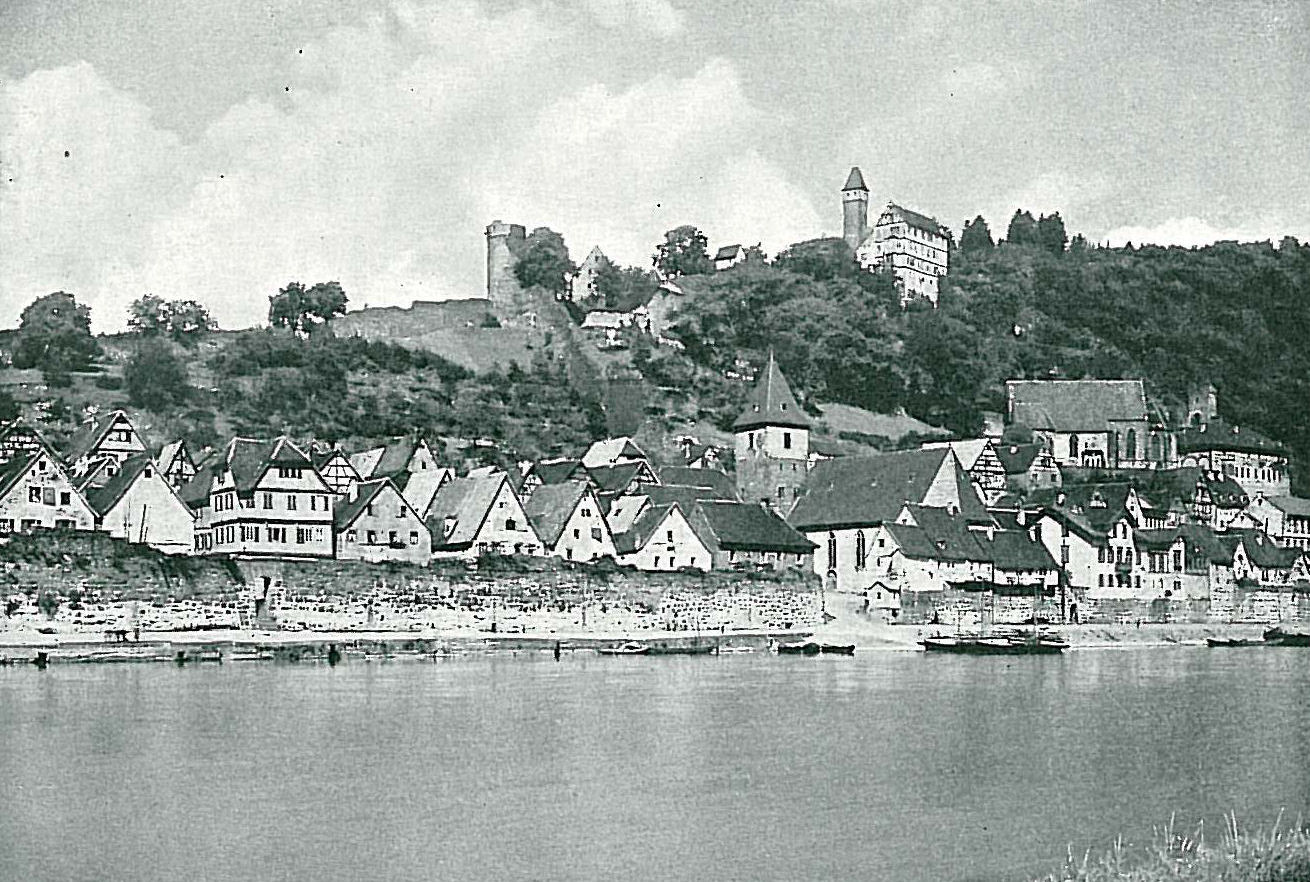
Hirschhorn 1896

=== Transfer to Hesse in 1803 ===
In 1803, Hirschhorn came into the possession of the Grand Duchy of Hesse-Darmstadt, and the monastery was again dissolved. From 1821 to 1832 Hirschhorn was an administrative district of its own, then it became part of the district of Heppenheim, and from 1848 to 1852 it belonged to the district of Erbach. There were skirmishes between revolutionaries and Federal troops in and around Hirschhorn in 1849 in connection with the revolution of 1848/49 in Baden. In 1852 Hirschhorn was joined to the district of Lindenfels, and in 1856 it returned to the district of Heppenheim, which later became the district of Bergstraße.

Hirschhorn around 1900

Steam navigation on the Neckar was introduced in 1841 and meant a moderate economic upturn. Horse-drawn barges finally disappeared from the river in 1878, when a seventy-mile-long chain was put on the river bed on which tugs could pull themselves upstream or downstream. A lot of bargemen became redundant and lost their jobs. The Neckar Valley Railway started to operate, connecting Hirschhorn with Heidelberg and Mosbach. The railway station was built outside the historical precinct of the town in the direction of Neckarsteinach, thus providing an incentive for further expansion of the town in this direction. On the Neckar, a weir with a lock and a bridge was completed in 1933. A second lock was added in 1959. The bridge linked Hirschhorn and Ersheim, which had been practically deserted centuries before; so as early as in the 1930s a few houses and a new school for Hirschhorn (which was enlarged in 1970) were built on the left bank.

=== Hirschhorn since the Second World War ===
When the Second World War ended, Hirschhorn had to accommodate large numbers of evacuees, and also expellees, mainly from Sudetenland. By the end of 1946, there were about 400 evacuees and about 415 refugees. The lack of space in the town itself made it necessary to create a new residential area on the Ersheim side. The cultivated plots and orchards of the previous centuries had to give way to housing. By 1982, nearly 1,000 homes had been built there. Today more people live in Ersheim than in the old part of the town. In 1960 Hirschhorn was recognized as a climatic health resort (Luftkurort). The village of Langenthal became part of Hirschhorn in 1972. In 1976, work was begun on the project "bridge - tunnel - bridge", which was completed in 1982 and provides a bypass for through traffic on the B 37 (Bundesstraße 37). The modern gym in Jahnstrasse was opened in 1983. The "once-in-a-century" flood of 1993 was particularly bad and left considerable damage.

== Politics ==
=== Town council ===
On March 14, 2021, the municipal election yielded the following results, compared to previous municipal elections:

Political grouping		% 2021	Seats; 2021	% 2016	Seats; 2016	% 2011	Seats; 2011	% 2006	Seats; 2006	% 2001	Seats; 2001
CDU	Christian Democratic Union	43,1	6	36,9	6	38,5	7	42,1	7	56,7	10
SPD	Social Democratic Party	23,2	4	26,9	5	31,1	5	28,2	5	43,3	7
Profil Hirschhorn	Profil Hirschhorn	33,8	5	36,2	6	30,4	5	29,6	5	–	–
Total		100,0	15	100,0	17	100,0	17	100,0	17	100,0	17
Voter turnout in %		51,5		51,2		58,6		53,2		57,3	

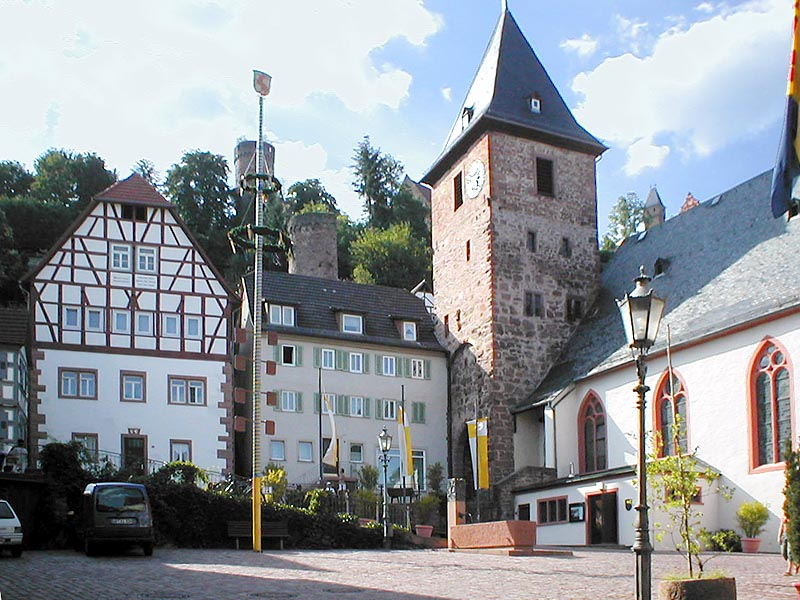
Marketplace with Catholic parish church

=== Mayor ===
According to the Hessian municipal constitution, the mayor is the chairman of the municipal council (German: Magistrat), which in the city of Hirschhorn includes six honorary city council members in addition to the mayor. The mayor since July 3, 2022, is Martin Hölz. His predecessors in office were:

- Oliver Berthold (2016-2022)
- Rainer Sens (2011-2016). He took office on June 15, 2011, was voted out of office in a referendum on June 5, 2016, and left office at the end of June 6, 2016. Until his successor took office, First City Councilor Karlheinz Happes (Profil Hirschhorn) took over the town council.
- Ute Stenger (1999–2011)
- Ilona Dörr (CDU) (1990–1999)
- Kurt Lambert (CDU) (1984–1990)

=== Coat of arms ===
Arms of the town

Banner flag

Blazon: "In gold a reared red stag (Hirsch) with a blue tongue."

The city of Hirschhorn in the Bergstraße district was approved by the Hessian Minister of the Interior on August 5, 1964, to change the previous coat of arms. The stag is a canting symbol. The colours go back to the coat of arms of the former local nobility, the Lords of Hirschhorn, who had an upright stag with five tails as their coat of arms. The coat of arms of the local nobility can still be seen on the historic buildings of the town.

The flag of the town of Hirschhorn was approved on September 4, 1964, and is described as follows: "On flag cloth banded in blue and yellow, applied to the cross point, the municipal coat of arms."

=== Twin Town ===
- Château-Landon, Seine-et-Marne, France since 1981

== Culture ==
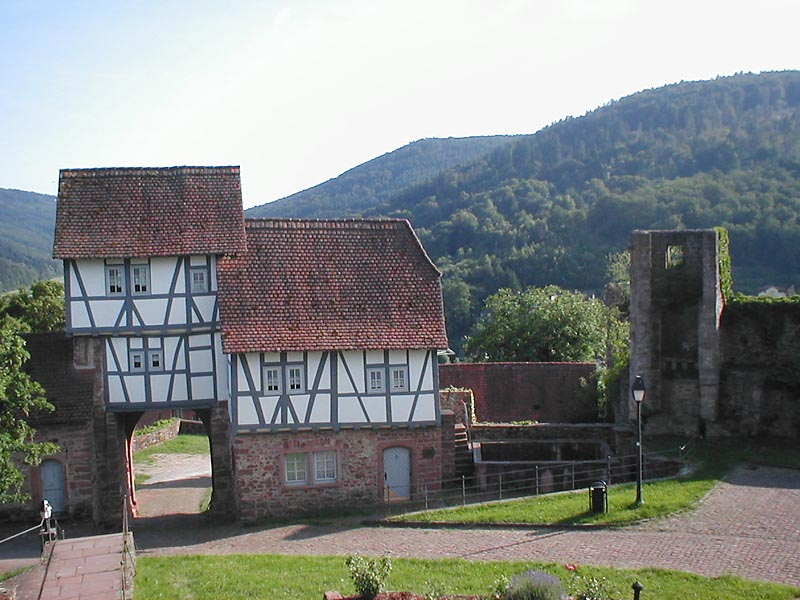
Hirschhorn Castle’s gatehouse

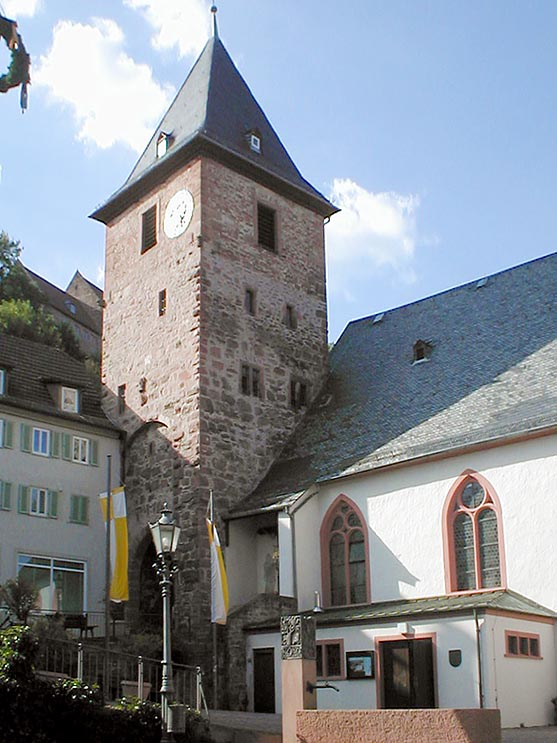
Catholic parish church with gate tower

=== Historical buildings ===
- Medieval Hirschhorn Castle occupies a mountain ridge above the town. In the castle, which is fortified by walls and towers, a keep, a great hall, stables and several gates and outbuildings can still be seen.
- The Carmelite Monastery Church of the Annunciation, consecrated in 1406, with its St Anne's chapel from 1513 is situated below the castle. A large number of gravestones of the Lords of Hirschhorn and also a Gothic sandstone rood screen can be seen there. Next to the church, there is the monastery building, nowadays the vicarage and also the home of a small group of Carmelite monks.
- The parish church of the Immaculate Conception was built as a Lutheran church from 1628 to 1630. In the course of the Counter-Reformation it was closed in 1636, and in 1730/31 it was re-opened as a Catholic parish church. The far older gate tower Mitteltor from 1392 serves as its belfry. The medieval town centre is still surrounded by its original town wall.
- The Protestant church, near Grabengasse, was consecrated in 1892.
- Ersheim Church on the left bank of the river, on a sort of peninsula within its horseshoe bend, was first mentioned in 773 (in the Lorsch codex) and is said to be the oldest church in the Neckar valley. It also contains some frescoes from the 14th and 15th centuries.
- Numerous half-timbered buildings have been preserved in the old part of Hirschhorn.
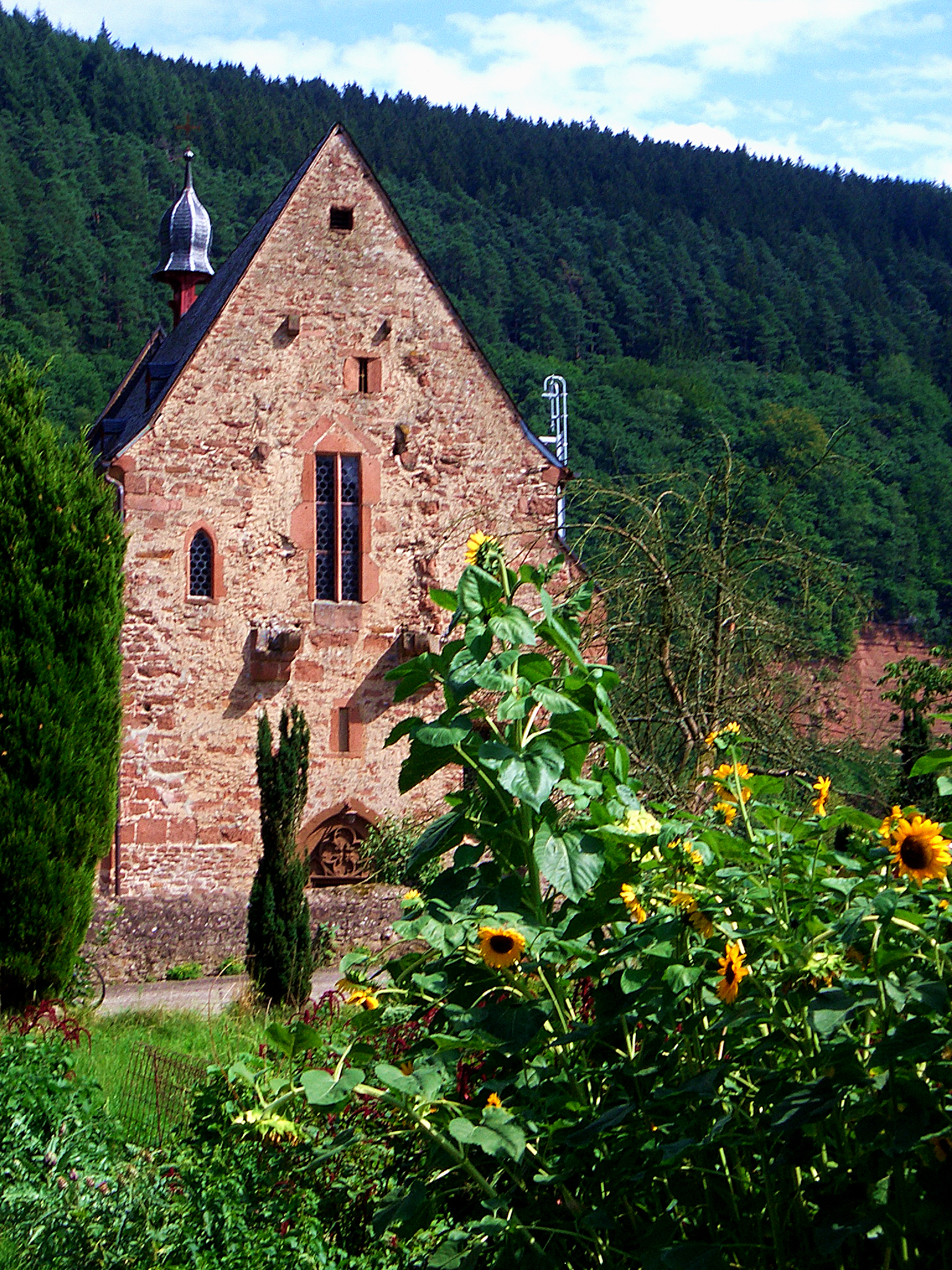
Ersheim Church

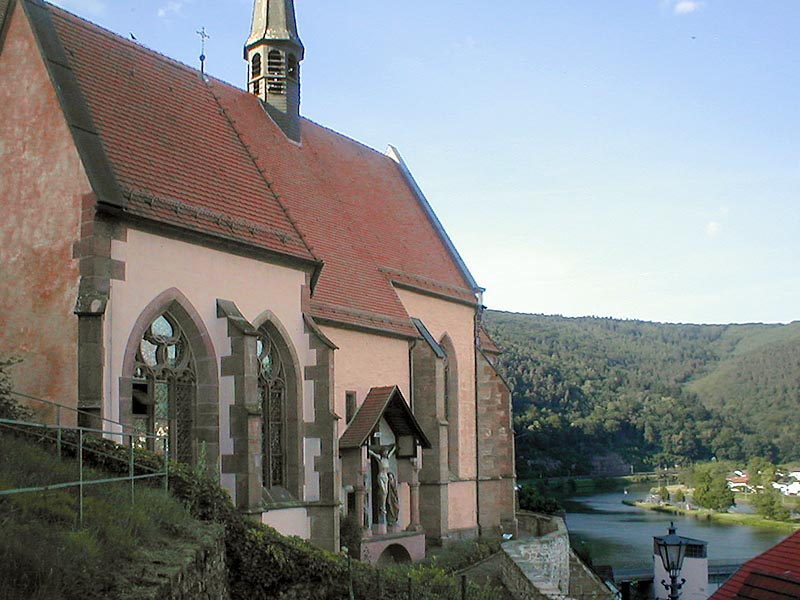
Monastery church

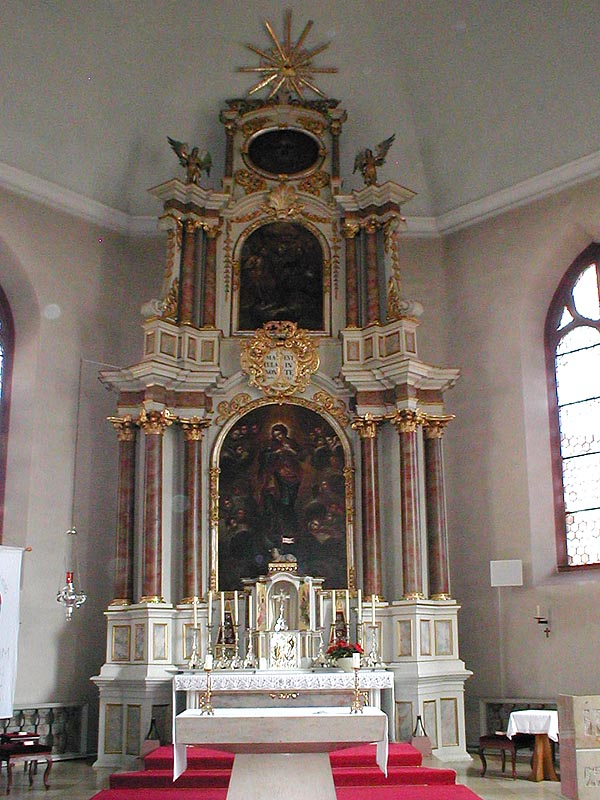
Altar of the Catholic parish church

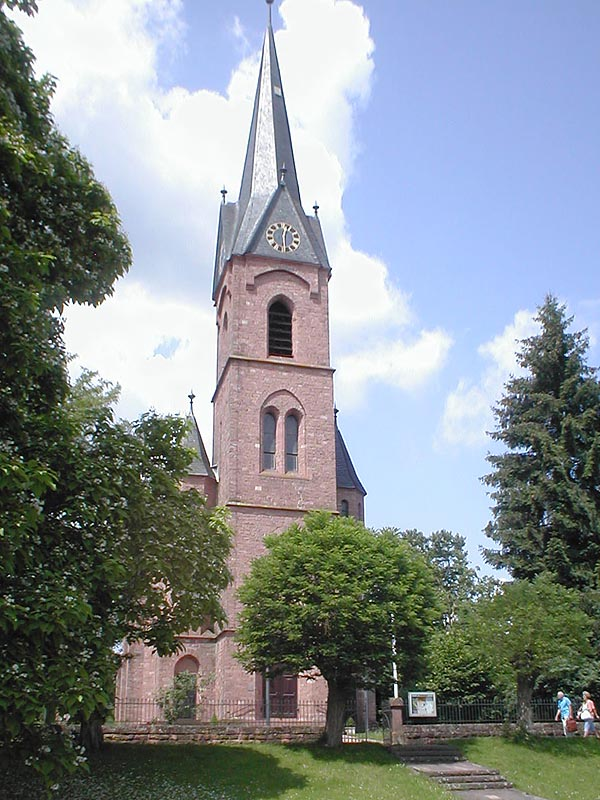
Protestant Church

=== Museum ===
Langbein Museum, on Alleeweg at the junction of Grabengasse, displays antiquities and natural history specimens that had been collected by the 19th-century Hirschhorn innkeeper and amateur taxidermist Carl Langbein (1816-1881). It shares its building, which used to be a forestry office, with the tourist information. Between May and September, this is also the starting point for free guided tours of the town and of the castle on Saturdays.

=== Hirschhorn in art and literature ===
In 1844 Joseph Mallord William Turner, the famous English Romantic artist, painted some watercolours of several places in the Neckar valley. He was on a trip to Switzerland, Heidelberg, and the Rhine. Two watercolours of Hirschhorn Castle are in the possession of The Tate Gallery, London, as well as two sketches of Hirschhorn with the church of Ersheim in the foreground.

J.M.W. Turner, Hirschhorn on the Neckar from the South

J.M.W. Turner, Hirschhorn on the Neckar from the North

Adolf Schmitthenner, a minister at the Church of the Holy Spirit in Heidelberg at the beginning of the 20th century, wrote a novel about Frederic, the last of the knights of Hirschhorn, who died in 1632, allegedly as the result of a curse by the mother of his cousin whom he had killed in a duel. Set against the background of the Thirty Years' War, Das Deutsche Herz gives a vivid impression of the age of chivalry in its decline.

Another famous visitor to Hirschhorn was Mark Twain. He travelled from Heilbronn to Hirschhorn by boat, stayed overnight at the hotel "Zum Naturalisten" on August 9, 1878, and continued his journey to Heidelberg by coach and train. In his book A Tramp Abroad, the boat becomes a raft, and the travellers end up in Hirschhorn after a terrible storm on the Neckar from which they just manage to escape. "I dozed off to sleep while contemplating a great white stuffed owl which was looking intently down on me from a high perch with the air of a person who thought he had met me before but could not make out for certain." This same owl can still be seen at Langbein Museum today. Twain's description of Hirschhorn is still as true as it was in 1878: "...Hirschhorn is best seen from a distance, down the river. Then the clustered brown towers perched on the green hilltop, and the old battlemented stone wall stretching up and over the grassy ridge and disappearing in the leafy sea beyond, make a picture whose grace and beauty entirely satisfy the eye."

In his book Gestalten der Kindheit (People in my Childhood), which was first published as a text in a literary magazine in 1948, Heinrich Weis remembers Hirschhorn people and places of his childhood in the years before the First World War. Weis was one of the literary editors of Badische Zeitung in Freiburg from 1946 to 1965.

The first president of the Federal Republic of Germany, Theodor Heuss, also fondly remembers a visit to Hirschhorn in 1925 ("Von Ort zu Ort" - "From one place to another"). Lying in the grass on the left bank opposite the town and the castle, he thinks, "You can be wonderfully lazy here". Little did he know that years later this very spot would be the site of Hirschhorn's new school building. Heuss then wanted to draw some of the wooden Baroque figures in Ersheim Church - and was locked in by mistake. It was only by ringing the church bell that he was able to draw attention to his plight.

== Economy and infrastructure ==
=== Transport ===
Route diagram of the RheinNeckar S-Bahn

- By rail: The RheinNeckar S-Bahn connects Hirschhorn with Heidelberg and Mannheim in the west and from there with the whole network of German Rail. Towards the northeast, the railway line leads to Mosbach and Osterburken, whereas another branch carries on along the Neckar to Heilbronn and Stuttgart. During the week, S-Bahn trains run every half hour, at the weekends the intervals are longer (usually an hour).
- By road: Bundesstrasse 37 (which is combined with Bundesstrasse 45 in this part of the Neckar valley) links Hirschhorn with Heidelberg and the motorways to the north, south and west, with Sinsheim and the region south of the Neckar and towards the Black Forest, and with Heilbronn and all the roads and motorways into the east, northeast and southeast. Through traffic is led past Hirschhorn over two bridges and through a tunnel, thus avoiding the long curve of the river where Hirschhorn is situated. The Odenwald hills and valleys can also easily be reached by car.

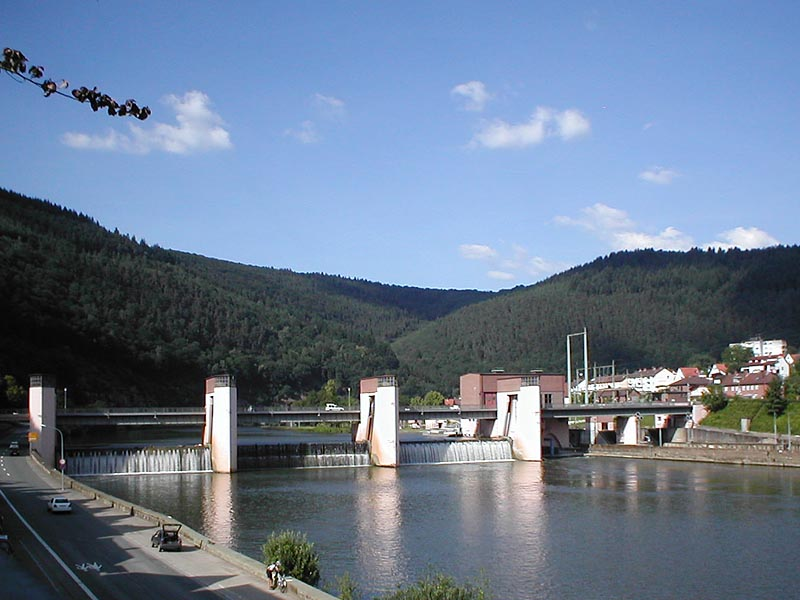
Neckar lock

- The River Neckar itself is a busy artery, too. Weirs and locks make the Neckar a navigable waterway, which is used by barges and pleasure boats. The weir and lock at Hirschhorn were built in 1933, together with a bridge across the Neckar, which led to a rapid expansion of the town on the south bank.

=== Major employers ===
- Ajax Tocco - Intec Induction (induction heating equipment)
- Biesinger (meters for electricity, gas, water etc.)
- Checkpoint Meto ("shrink management" solutions for retailers; labelling)
- Contact (labelling; shrink management)
- Dekodur (laminate technology)
- GH Induction GmbH (induction heating equipment)

=== Education ===
- Neckartalschule Hirschhorn (primary school)

=== Leisure and sport ===
- Gymnasium and sports field on Jahnstrasse
- Primary school gymnasium
- Campsite swimming pool
- Neckar Valley cycling path
- Stoppomat: a timekeeping installation for cycling and other sports

== Sources and further reading ==
- Alfred Röder: Von Ersheim zu Hirschhorn, Magistrat der Stadt Hirschhorn, 1984
- Ulrich Spiegelberg: Das Schloss Hirschhorn am Neckar, Schnell und Steiner GmbH, Regensburg 2008
- Hirschhorn Castle on the Neckar River, ed. Verwaltung der Staatlichen Schlösser und Gärten Hessen, Schnell und Steiner GmbH, Regensburg 2008, ISBN 978-3-7954-6665-7
- Christina Kimmel: Hans V. von Hirschhorn im Dienst der Kurpfalz, Verlag Regionalkultur, Ubstadt-Weiher 1999, ISBN 3-89735-124-2
- Ulrich Spiegelberg: Hirschhorn - Stadt und Umgebung, Deutscher Kunstverlag, Muenchen / Berlin 2007, ISBN 978-3-422-02087-0
- Ulrich Spiegelberg, Hirschhorn und seine Kirchen, Deutscher Kunstverlag, Muenchen / Berlin 2006, ISBN 978-3-422-02036-8
- Adolf Schmitthenner: Das deutsche Herz, 3. Auflage, Stadt Hirschhorn, 1999, ISBN 3-927409-00-6 (first edition 1927)
- Mark Twain: A Tramp Abroad, Mineola (Dover edition) 2002, ISBN 0-486-42445-6
- Heinrich Weis: Gestalten der Kindheit, Worms 1968
- Theodor Heuss: Von Ort zu Ort, Deutsche Verlagsanstalt, Stuttgart 1986, ISBN 3-421-06225-0
