= Wetterau I =

Federal electoral district of Germany

176 Wetterau I
- Electoral district for the Bundestag
- Wetterau I in 2025
- State: Hesse
- Population: 243,000 (2019)
- Electorate: 176,897 (2021)
- Major settlements: Bad Vilbel; Bad Nauheim; Friedberg
- Area: 745.8 km^{2}

Current electoral district
- Created: 1949
- Party: CDU
- Member: Thomas Pauls
- Elected: 2025

Wetterau I is an electoral constituency (German: Wahlkreis) represented in the Bundestag. It elects one member via first-past-the-post voting. Under the current constituency numbering system, it is designated as constituency 176. It is located in central Hesse, comprising most of the Wetteraukreis district.

Wetterau I was created for the inaugural 1949 federal election. From 2021 to 2025, it was represented by Natalie Pawlik of the Social Democratic Party (SPD). Since 2025 it has been represented by Thomas Pauls of the CDU.

== Geography ==
Wetterau I is located in central Hesse. As of the 2021 federal election, it comprises the entirety of the Wetteraukreis district excluding the municipalities of Altenstadt, Büdingen, Gedern, Glauburg, Hirzenhain, Kefenrod, Limeshain, and Ortenberg.

== History ==
Wetterau I was created in 1949, then known as Friedberg. In the 1976 through 2009 elections, it was named Wetterau. It acquired its current name in the 2013 election. In the 1949 election, it was Hesse constituency 11 in the numbering system. From 1953 through 1976, it was number 136. From 1980 through 1998, it was number 134. In the 2002 and 2005 elections, it was number 178. In the 2009 through 2021 elections, it was number 177. From the 2025 election, it has been number 176.

Originally, the constituency comprised the districts of Büdingen and Friedberg. From 1976 through 1998, it was coterminous with the Wetteraukreis district. In the 2002 through 2009 elections, it comprised the Wetteraukreis district and the municipalities of Bad Soden-Salmünster, Brachttal, and Wächtersbach from the Main-Kinzig-Kreis district. It acquired its current borders in the 2013 election.

Election	No.	Name	Borders
1949	11	Friedberg	Büdingen district; Friedberg district
1953	136	Friedberg	Büdingen district; Friedberg district
1957	136	Friedberg	Büdingen district; Friedberg district
1961	136	Friedberg	Büdingen district; Friedberg district
1965	136	Friedberg	Büdingen district; Friedberg district
1969	136	Friedberg	Büdingen district; Friedberg district
1972	136	Obertaunuskreis (Hochtaunuskreis)	Büdingen district; Friedberg district
1976	136	Wetterau	Wetteraukreis district
1980	134	Wetterau	Wetteraukreis district
1983	134	Wetterau	Wetteraukreis district
1987	134	Wetterau	Wetteraukreis district
1990	134	Wetterau	Wetteraukreis district
1994	134	Wetterau	Wetteraukreis district
1998	134	Wetterau	Wetteraukreis district
2002	178	Wetterau	Wetteraukreis district; Main-Kinzig-Kreis district (only Bad Soden-Salmünster, Brachttal, and Wächtersbach municipalities)
2005	178	Wetterau	Wetteraukreis district; Main-Kinzig-Kreis district (only Bad Soden-Salmünster, Brachttal, and Wächtersbach municipalities)
2009	177	Wetterau	Wetteraukreis district; Main-Kinzig-Kreis district (only Bad Soden-Salmünster, Brachttal, and Wächtersbach municipalities)
2013	177	Wetterau I	Wetteraukreis district (excluding Altenstadt, Büdingen, Gedern, Glauburg, Hirzenhain, Kefenrod, Limeshain, and Ortenberg municipalities)
2017	177	Wetterau I	Wetteraukreis district (excluding Altenstadt, Büdingen, Gedern, Glauburg, Hirzenhain, Kefenrod, Limeshain, and Ortenberg municipalities)
2021	177	Wetterau I	Wetteraukreis district (excluding Altenstadt, Büdingen, Gedern, Glauburg, Hirzenhain, Kefenrod, Limeshain, and Ortenberg municipalities)
2025	176	Wetterau I	Wetteraukreis district (excluding Altenstadt, Büdingen, Gedern, Glauburg, Hirzenhain, Kefenrod, Limeshain, and Ortenberg municipalities)

== Members ==
The constituency was first represented by Wilhelm Knothe of the Social Democratic Party (SPD) from 1949 until his death in 1952. Fellow party member Kurt Moosdorf won the subsequent by-election, but Willi Richter replaced him as SPD candidate and representative in the 1953 federal election. Richter was succeeded by Lucie Beyer in 1957. Georg Schlaga then served from 1969 to 1983. Christian Schwarz-Schilling of the Christian Democratic Union (CDU) was elected in 1983 and was representative until 1998. Nina Hauer won the constituency for the SPD in 1998 and served three terms. Lucia Puttrich of the CDU was then representative from 2009 to 2013. Oswin Veith was elected in 2013 and re-elected in 2017. He resigned in March 2020 to become chairman of Oberhessische Versorgungsbetriebe (OVAG). Natalie Pawlik was elected for the SPD in 2021.

Election	Member	Party	%
1949	Wilhelm Knothe	SPD	33.1
1952	Kurt Moosdorf	SPD	
1953	Willi Richter	SPD	37.3
1957	Lucie Beyer	SPD	41.1
1961	Lucie Beyer	SPD	47.1
1965	Lucie Beyer	SPD	49.8
1969	Georg Schlaga	SPD	51.3
1972	Georg Schlaga	SPD	53.8
1976	Georg Schlaga	SPD	47.8
1980	Georg Schlaga	SPD	49.6
1983	Christian Schwarz-Schilling	CDU	44.2
1987	Christian Schwarz-Schilling	CDU	45.3
1990	Christian Schwarz-Schilling	CDU	44.2
1994	Christian Schwarz-Schilling	CDU	46.3
1998	Nina Hauer	SPD	46.3
2002	Nina Hauer	SPD	46.4
2005	Nina Hauer	SPD	43.3
2009	Lucia Puttrich	CDU	41.0
2013	Oswin Veith	CDU	47.1
2017	Oswin Veith	CDU	36.4
2021	Natalie Pawlik	SPD	29.7
2025	Thomas Pauls	CDU	33.7

== Election results ==
=== 2025 election ===
Federal election (2025): Wetterau I
Notes:	Blue background denotes the winner of the electorate vote. Pink background denotes a candidate elected from their party list. Yellow background denotes an electorate win by a list member, or other incumbent. A ✓ or ✗ denotes status of any incumbent, win or lose respectively.						
Party	Candidate	Votes	%	±%	Party votes	%	±%
CDU	Thomas Pauls	49,929	33.7	▲5.3	45,704	30.7	▲7.1
SPD	✗ Natalie Pawlik	38,192	25.7	▼3.9	26,144	17.6	▼8.6
AfD	Klaus Hermann	25,930	17.5	▲9.2	25,828	17.4	▲8.9
Greens	Joshua Edel	14,407	9.7	▼4.2	19,686	13.2	▼2.7
Left	Lukas Freiberger	7,726	5.2	▲2.4	10,598	7.1	▲3.6
FDP	Peter Heidt	5,766	3.9	▼7.1	7,963	5.4	▼8.5
BSW					5,714	3.8	New
FW	Cenk Gönül	3,830	2.6	▼0.5	2,377	1.6	▼0.4
Tierschutzpartei					1,990	1.3	▼0.3
Volt	Markus Maienschein	2,575	1.7	New	1,425	1.0	▲0.6
PARTEI					824	0.6	▼0.3
BD					221	0.1	New
Humanists					130	0.1	0.0
MLPD					29	<0.1	0.0
Informal votes		1,442			1,164		
Total valid votes		148,355			148,633		
Turnout		149,797	84.7	▲6.1			
CDU gain from SPD	Majority	11,737	8.0	N/A			

=== 2021 election ===
Federal election (2021): Wetterau I
Notes:	Blue background denotes the winner of the electorate vote. Pink background denotes a candidate elected from their party list. Yellow background denotes an electorate win by a list member, or other incumbent. A ✓ or ✗ denotes status of any incumbent, win or lose respectively.						
Party	Candidate	Votes	%	±%	Party votes	%	±%
SPD	Natalie Pawlik	40,618	29.7	▲0.6	35,909	26.2	▲3.5
CDU	Armin Häuser	38,807	28.3	▼8.1	32,419	23.6	▼8.4
Greens	Michaela Colletti	18,996	13.9	▲5.6	21,917	16.0	▲6.5
FDP	Peter Heidt	15,000	11.0	▲2.9	19,043	13.9	▲1.1
AfD	Andreas Lichert	11,318	8.3	▼2.7	11,680	8.5	▼3.1
FW	Cenk Gönül	4,238	3.1	▲1.3	2,812	2.0	▲1.1
Left	Julian Eder	3,904	2.9	▼2.1	4,905	3.6	▼3.2
Tierschutzpartei					2,255	1.6	▲0.5
dieBasis	Eva Rosen	2,411	1.8		1,915	1.4	
PARTEI					1,153	0.8	0.0
Pirates	Stephan Flindt	1,633	1.2		771	0.6	▲0.2
Team Todenhöfer					637	0.5	
Volt					559	0.4	
NPD					352	0.3	▼0.3
Gesundheitsforschung					230	0.2	
V-Partei3					162	0.1	▼0.1
ÖDP					145	0.1	▼0.1
Humanists					139	0.1	
Bündnis C					114	0.1	
Bündnis 21					50	0.0	
LKR					39	0.0	
DKP					29	0.0	0.0
MLPD					22	0.0	0.0
Informal votes		2,010			1,678		
Total valid votes		136,925			137,257		
Turnout		138,935	78.5	▼0.2			
SPD gain from CDU	Majority	1,811	1.4				

=== 2017 election ===
Federal election (2017): Wetterau I
Notes:	Blue background denotes the winner of the electorate vote. Pink background denotes a candidate elected from their party list. Yellow background denotes an electorate win by a list member, or other incumbent. A ✓ or ✗ denotes status of any incumbent, win or lose respectively.						
Party	Candidate	Votes	%	±%	Party votes	%	±%
CDU	✓ Oswin Veith	49,891	36.4	▼10.6	43,951	32.0	▼8.9
SPD	Natalie Pawlik	39,773	29.0	▼2.9	31,152	22.7	▼4.7
AfD	Klaus Herrmann	14,987	10.9		15,895	11.6	▲5.6
Greens	Kathrin Anders	11,368	8.3	▲0.9	13,002	9.5	▲0.1
FDP	Peter Heidt (Note: Heidt entered the Bundestag on the FDP list after the resignation of Nicola Beer in July 2019.)	11,047	8.1	▲5.3	17,462	12.7	▲6.8
Left	Julian Simon Eder	6,719	4.9	▲0.1	9,249	6.7	▲1.6
Tierschutzpartei					1,632	1.2	
FW	Thorsten Schwellnus	2,417	1.8	▼0.1	1,299	0.9	▼0.2
PARTEI					1,199	0.9	▲0.4
NPD	Stefan Jagsch	719	0.5	▼1.3	811	0.6	▼0.9
Pirates					544	0.4	▼1.6
DM					249	0.2	
V-Partei³					239	0.2	
BGE					233	0.2	
ÖDP					229	0.2	
BüSo					27	0.0	▼0.1
MLPD					24	0.0	0.0
DKP					23	0.0	
Informal votes		1,932			1,633		
Total valid votes		136,921			137,220		
Turnout		138,853	78.7	▲3.6			
CDU hold	Majority	10,118	7.4	▼7.8			

=== 2013 election ===
Federal election (2013): Wetterau I
Notes:	Blue background denotes the winner of the electorate vote. Pink background denotes a candidate elected from their party list. Yellow background denotes an electorate win by a list member, or other incumbent. A ✓ or ✗ denotes status of any incumbent, win or lose respectively.						
Party	Candidate	Votes	%	±%	Party votes	%	±%
CDU	Oswin Veith	60,118	47.1	▲5.7	52,419	40.9	▲7.4
SPD	Stefan Lux	40,805	31.9	▼1.0	34,937	27.3	▲2.7
Greens	Antje Gesinn	9,497	7.4	▲0.1	11,991	9.4	▼2.1
AfD					7,608	5.9	
Left	Gabriele Faulhaber	6,174	4.8	▼1.0	6,615	5.2	▼2.1
FDP	Natascha Colette Baumann	3,527	2.8	▼6.4	7,586	5.9	▼12.0
Pirates	Marc Stephan Weitz	2,863	2.2		2,535	2.0	▼0.1
FW	Rebecca Scholz	2,422	1.9		1,440	1.1	
NPD	Stefan Jagsch	2,364	1.9	0.0	1,860	1.5	▼0.3
PARTEI					604	0.5	
REP					194	0.2	▼0.1
PRO					170	0.1	
BüSo					110	0.1	0.0
SGP					57	0.0	
MLPD					23	0.0	0.0
Informal votes		3,710			3,331		
Total valid votes		127,770			128,149		
Turnout		131,480	75.1	▼0.6			
CDU hold	Majority	19,313	15.2	▲7.3			

=== 2009 election ===
Federal election (2009): Wetterau
Notes:	Blue background denotes the winner of the electorate vote. Pink background denotes a candidate elected from their party list. Yellow background denotes an electorate win by a list member, or other incumbent. A ✓ or ✗ denotes status of any incumbent, win or lose respectively.						
Party	Candidate	Votes	%	±%	Party votes	%	±%
CDU	Lucia Puttrich	73,702	41.0	▼0.9	60,038	33.4	▼1.2
SPD	✗ Nina Hauer	59,420	33.1	▼10.2	45,085	25.1	▼9.6
FDP	Achim Güssgen	16,284	9.1	▲4.9	31,612	17.6	▲5.1
Greens	Christian Kolb	12,425	6.9	▲3.0	19,242	10.7	▲1.6
Left	Gabriele Faulhaber	11,116	6.2	▲2.2	13,681	7.6	▲2.6
Pirates					3,623	2.0	
NPD	Daniel Lachmann	3,792	2.1	▼0.1	3,426	1.9	▼0.1
Tierschutzpartei	Christa Rust	2,631	1.5		2,069	1.2	▲0.3
REP					677	0.4	▼0.3
Independent	Manuel Hachenburger	328	0.2				
BüSo					182	0.1	0.0
DVU					138	0.1	
MLPD					45	0.0	0.0
Informal votes		4,122			4,002		
Total valid votes		179,698			179,818		
Turnout		183,820	74.5	▼4.2			
CDU gain from SPD	Majority	14,282	7.9				

=== 2005 election ===
Federal election (2005):Wetterau
Notes:	Blue background denotes the winner of the electorate vote. Pink background denotes a candidate elected from their party list. Yellow background denotes an electorate win by a list member, or other incumbent. A ✓ or ✗ denotes status of any incumbent, win or lose respectively.						
Party	Candidate	Votes	%	±%	Party votes	%	±%
SPD	✓ Nina Hauer	80,828	43.3	▼3.1	64,729	34.7	▼4.4
CDU	Klaus Minkel	78,156	41.9	▲0.3	64,594	34.6	▼3.4
FDP	Achim Güssgen	7,788	4.2	▼0.9	23,215	12.4	▲3.6
Left	Martin Hinz	7,439	4.0	▲3.2	9,267	4.96	▲3.9
Greens	Brigitte Nell-Düvel	7,251	3.9	▼0.3	17,051	9.1	▼0.8
NPD	Carsten von Waffenstein	4,176	2.2	▲0.7	3,695	2.0	▲1.0
Tierschutzpartei					1,566	0.8	▲0.8
REP					1,221	0.7	▲0.1
Independent	Jürgen Demuth	1,039	0.6				
GRAUEN					797	0.4	▲0.2
SGP					231	0.1	
BüSo					172	0.1	▲0.1
MLPD					83	0.0	
Informal votes		4,468			4,524		
Total valid votes		186,677			186,621		
Turnout		191,145	78.7	▼1.5			
SPD hold	Majority	2,672	1.4				
