= Florstadt =

- Town
- Coat of arms

- Location of Florstadt within Wetteraukreis district
- Interactive map of Florstadt
- Location within Germany Location within Hesse
- Coordinates: 50°18′57″N 8°51′47″E
- Country: Germany
- State: Hesse
- Admin. region: Darmstadt
- District: Wetteraukreis
- Subdivisions: 6 districts

Government
  - Mayor (2024–30): Daniel Imbescheid (CDU)

Area
  - Total: 39.6 km^{2} (15.3 sq mi)
- Elevation: 156 m (512 ft)

Population (2025-12-31)
  - Total: 9,073
  - Density: 229/km^{2} (593/sq mi)
- Time zone: UTC+01:00 (CET)
  - Summer (DST): UTC+02:00 (CEST)
- Postal codes: 61197
- Dialling codes: 06035, 06041 (Nieder-Mockstadt)
- Vehicle registration: FB
- Website: www.florstadt.de

Florstadt (German pronunciation: [ˈfloːɐ̯ʃtat]) is a town in the Wetteraukreis, in Hesse, Germany. It is located approximately 26 kilometers (16 miles) northeast of Frankfurt am Main. It received town privileges in 2007.

== Rivers ==
The river Nidda and its tributary the Horloff flow through the area of the town.

== Location ==
Florstadt borders on the town Reichelsheim in the north, on Ranstadt in the northeast, on Glauburg in the east, on Altenstadt and Niddatal in the south, and on Friedberg in the west.

== Districts ==
The town is divided into six districts: Leidhecken, Nieder-Florstadt, Nieder-Mockstadt, Ober-Florstadt, Staden and Stammheim.
