= Waldbach (Schwalbach) =

River in Hesse, Germany

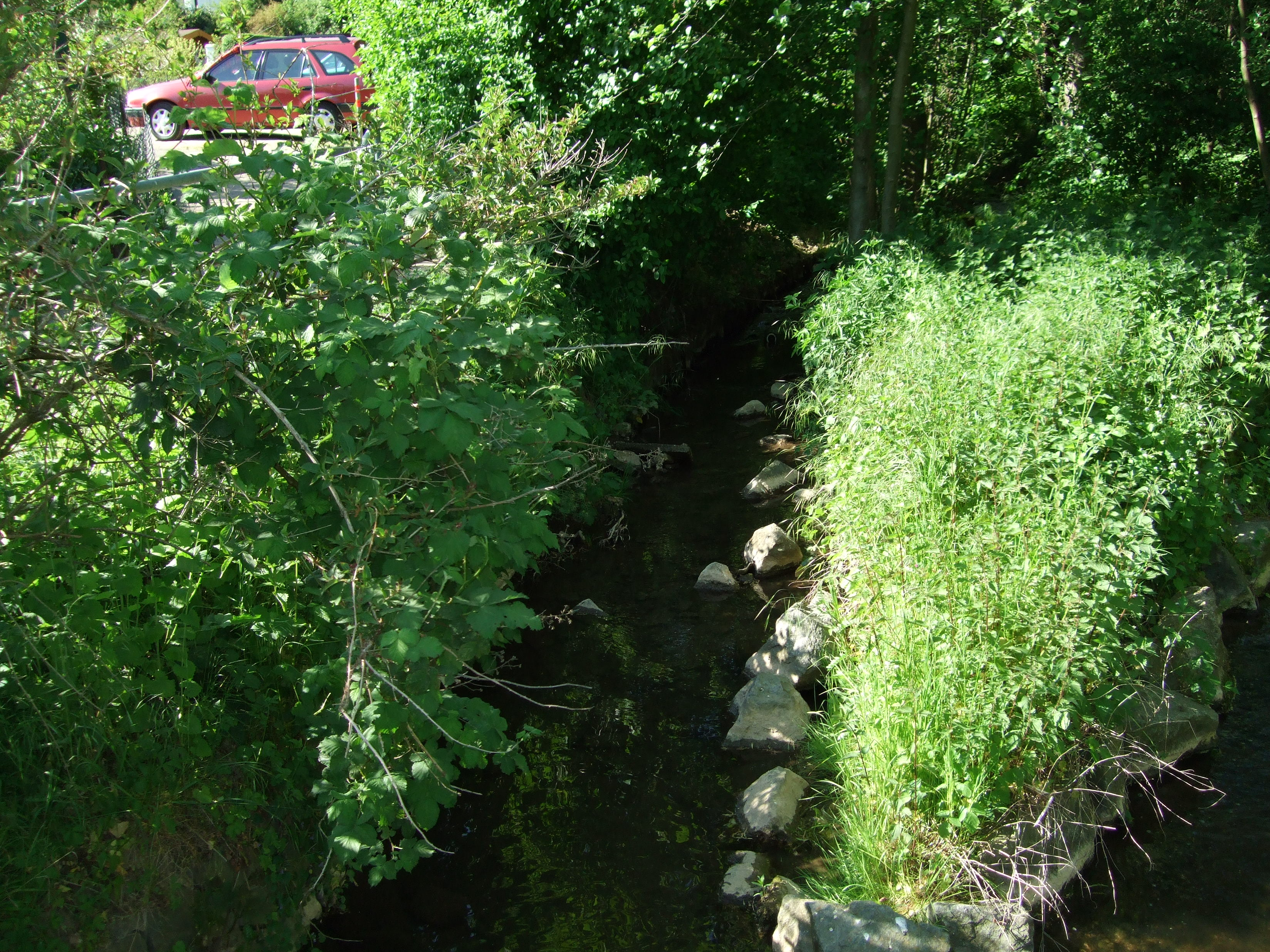

Location
- Country: Germany
- State: Hesse

Physical characteristics
- Mouth
  - location: Schwalbach
  - coordinates: 50.1478°N 8.5364°E

Basin features
- Progression: Schwalbach→ Sulzbach→ Nidda→ Main→ Rhine→ North Sea

Waldbach is a river of Hesse, Germany. At its confluence with the Sauerbornsbach in Schwalbach am Taunus, the Schwalbach is formed.

== See also ==
- List of rivers of Hesse
