= Schwalbach (Sulzbach) =

River in Germany

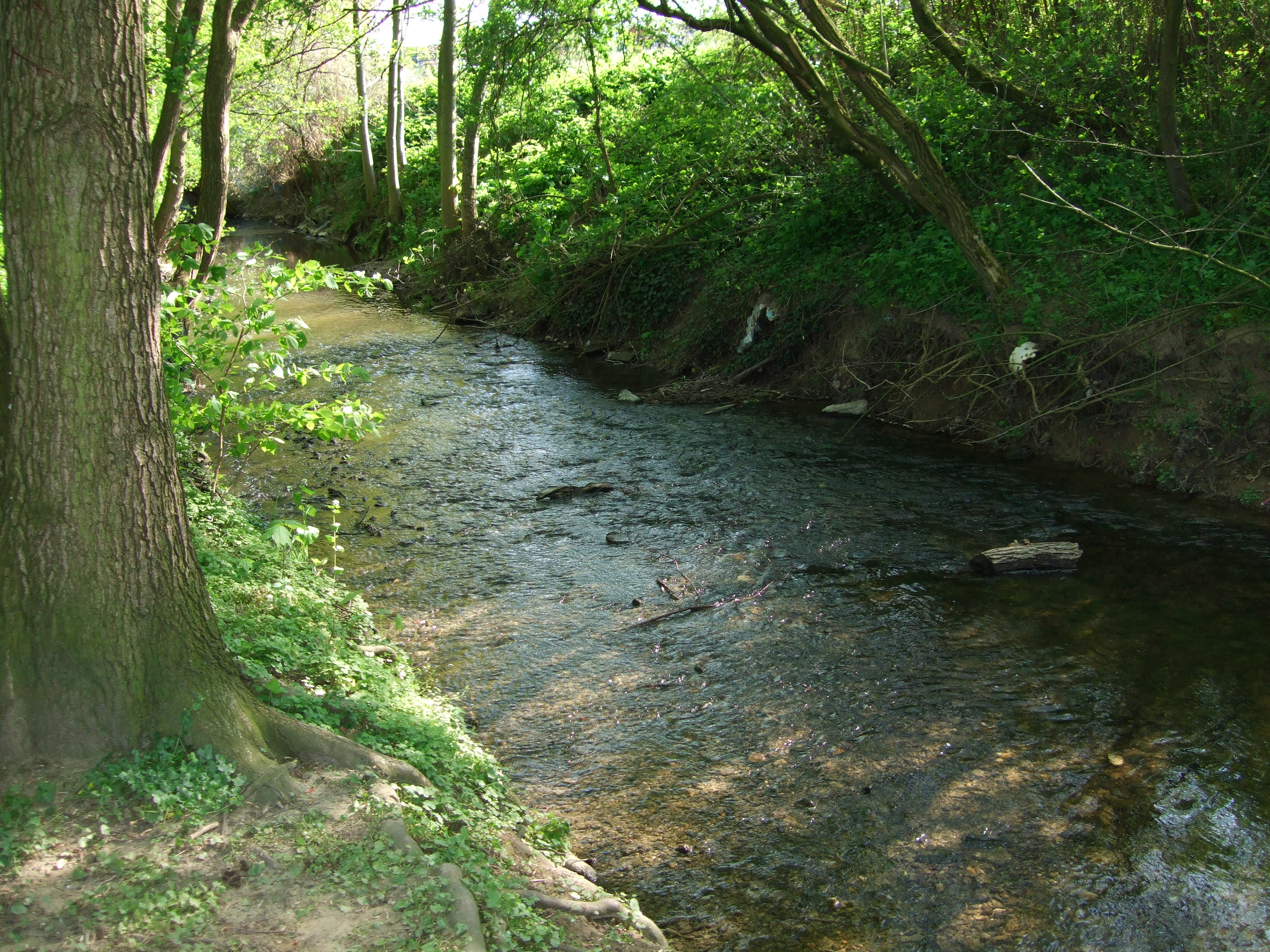

Location
- Country: Germany
- States: Hesse

Physical characteristics
- Mouth
  - location: Sulzbach
  - coordinates: 50°07′44″N 08°32′27″E

Basin features
- Progression: Sulzbach→ Nidda→ Main→ Rhine→ North Sea

Schwalbach is a river of Hesse, Germany. It is formed in Schwalbach am Taunus at the confluence of the rivers Sauerbornsbach and Waldbach. It is a left tributary of the Sulzbach, into which it flows near Sulzbach.

== See also ==
- List of rivers of Hesse
