= Sauerbornsbach =

River in Germany

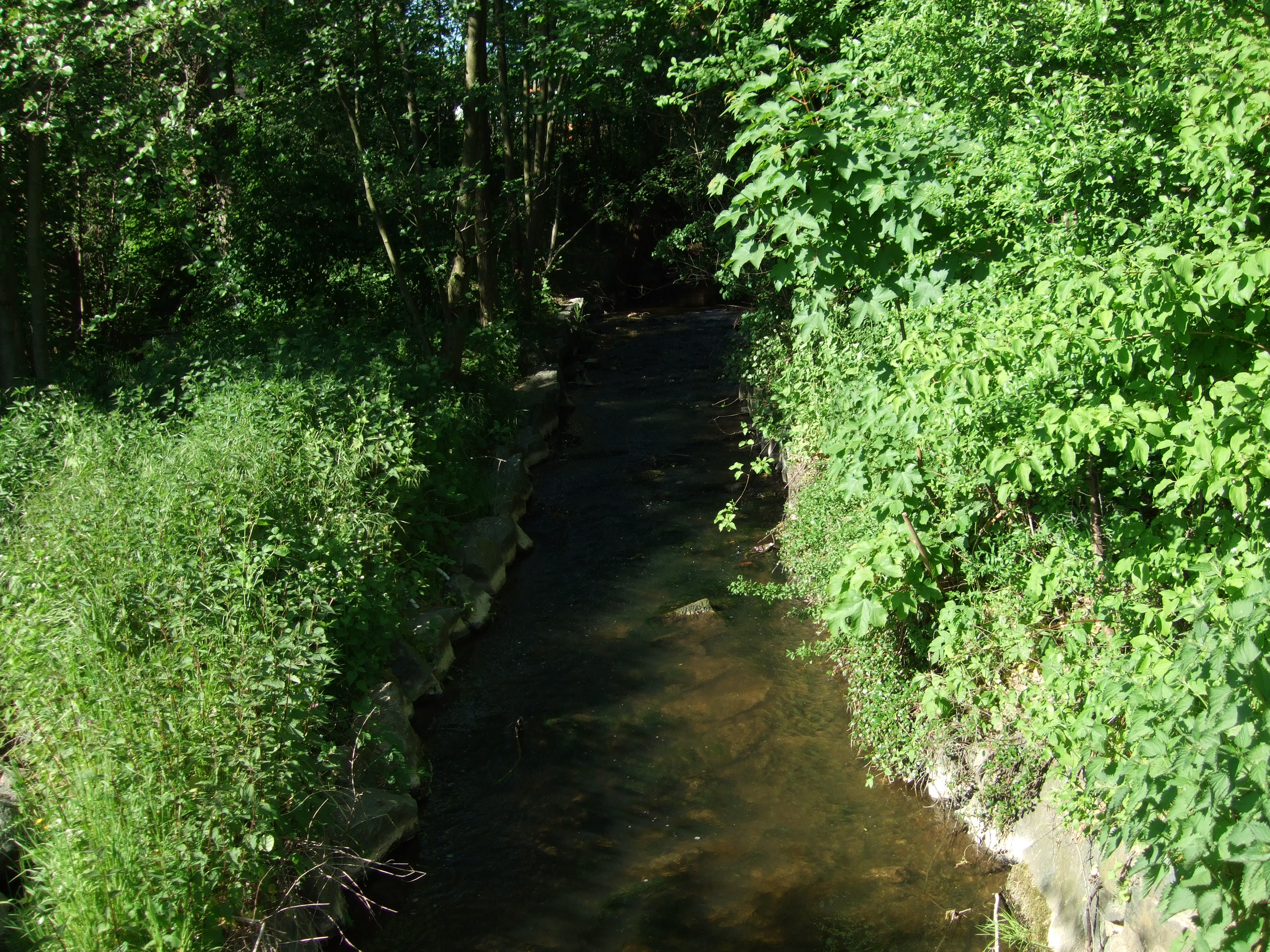

Location
- Country: Germany
- State: Hesse

Physical characteristics
- Mouth
  - location: Schwalbach
  - coordinates: 50.1478°N 8.5364°E

Basin features
- Progression: Schwalbach→ Sulzbach→ Nidda→ Main→ Rhine→ North Sea

Sauerbornsbach is a small river of Hesse, Germany.

The upper course of the Sauerbornsbach is sometimes called Hollerbornbach, sometimes the Hollerbornbach is considered as the right and the Rentbach as the left headstream of the Sauerbornsbach.

At the Sauerbornsbach's confluence with the Waldbach in Schwalbach am Taunus, the Schwalbach is formed.

== See also ==
- List of rivers of Hesse
