= Thomas Pauls =

German politician (born 1986)

Thomas Pauls MdB
- Pauls in 2026

Member of the Bundestag; for Wetterau I
- Incumbent
- Assumed office 25 March 2025
- Preceded by: Natalie Pawlik

Personal details
- Born: 3 October 1986 (age 40) Würselen, West Germany
- Party: Christian Democratic Union
- Children: 1
- Education: University of Cologne; Maastricht University

Thomas Pauls (born 3 October 1986) is a German politician who was elected as a member of the Bundestag in 2025. He has served as chairman of the Christian Democratic Employees' Association in Wetterau since 2024.
