= Bernd Siebert (politician) =

German politician (1949–2023)

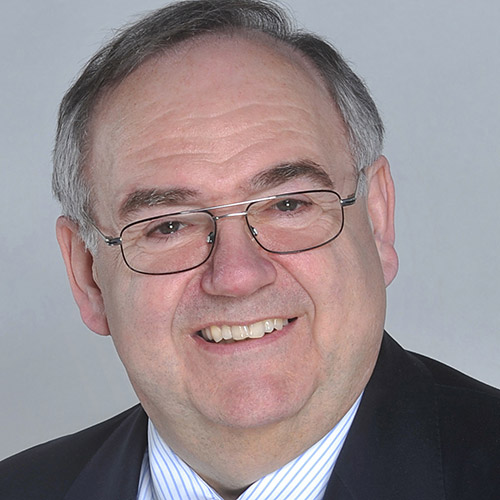
- Siebert in 2014

Member of the Bundestag; from Hesse
- In office 2 March 2020 – 26 October 2021
- Preceded by: Oswin Veith
- Succeeded by: Natalie Pawlik
- Constituency: Wetterau I
- In office 6 September 2010 – 24 October 2017
- Preceded by: Lucia Puttrich
- Succeeded by: Multi-member district
- Constituency: Wetterau (2010–2013); State list (2013–2017)
- In office 10 November 1994 – 27 October 2009
- Constituency: State list

Member of the Landtag of Hesse
- In office 5 April 1991 – 21 November 1994
- Preceded by: Multi-member district
- Succeeded by: Eva Ludwig
- Constituency: State list

Personal details
- Born: 17 October 1949 Gudensberg, Hesse, West Germany
- Died: 16 December 2023 (aged 74)
- Party: Christian Democratic Union
- Children: 2

Bernd Siebert (17 October 1949 – 16 December 2023) was a German politician of the Christian Democratic Union (CDU) who served as a member of the Bundestag from the state of Hesse from 1994 to 2009, from 2010 to 2017 and from 2020 to 2021.

== Life and career ==
Siebert was first elected to the German Parliament in 1994. In parliament, he served a member of the Defense Committee. From 2005 to 2009, he was his parliamentary group's spokesperson for defense policy. He died on 16 December 2023, at the age 74.
