= Laisbach =

River in Germany

Location
- Country: Germany
- State: Hesse

Physical characteristics
- Mouth
  - location: Nidda
  - coordinates: 50.3609°N 8.9581°E
- Length: 17.9 km (11.1 mi)

Basin features
- Progression: Nidda→ Main→ Rhine→ North Sea

Laisbach is a river of Hesse, Germany. It flows into the Nidda near Ranstadt.

== See also ==
- List of rivers of Hesse
