= Salzbach =

Salzbach may refer to:

- Salzbach (Lauter), a river of Rhineland-Palatinate, Germany, tributary of the Lauter
- Salzbach (Nidda), a river in Hesse, Germany, tributary of the Nidda
- Salzbach (Elbbach), a river in Hesse, Germany, tributary of the Elbbach
- Salzbach (Seemenbach), a river in Hesse, Germany, tributary of the Seemenbach
- Salzbach (Wiesbaden), a river in Hesse, Germany, at Wiesbaden, tributary of the Rhine
- Marquard von Salzbach, a Teutonic Knight
- Solanka (German name Salzbach), a village in Poland
- Salzbach, the occasional German name of the river Sajó in central Slovakia and northeastern Hungary
