= Dornbach =

Dornbach may refer to:

- Maximilian Dörnbach (born 1995), German track cyclist
- Dornbach (Eschbach), a river of Hesse, Germany, tributary of the Eschbach
- Dörnbach (Rockenhausen), a part of the town Rockenhausen, Rhineland-Palatinate, Germany
- Dornbach (Vienna), a part of the Vienna district Hernals, Austria
