= Ulfa =

Ulfa may refer to:

- Ulfa (river), of Hesse, Germany
- United Liberation Front of Assam
- Zakia Ulfa, Indonesian Badminton Player
- Ulfa, a district of Nidda, Hesse, Germany
- Ulfa (gastropod), a genus in family Pyramidellidae
