= Kalbach (disambiguation) =

Kalbach is a municipality in the district of Fulda, in Hesse, Germany.

Kalbach may also refer to:

- Kalbach (Nidda), a river of Hesse, Germany, tributary of the Nidda
- Kalbach-Riedberg, a district of Frankfurt am Main, Germany, formed of Kalbach and Riedberg

== See also ==
- Herbert W. Kalmbach
