= Wehrbach (Nidda) =

River in Germany

Location
- Country: Germany
- State: Hesse

Physical characteristics
- Mouth
  - location: Nidda
  - coordinates: 50.3352°N 8.9159°E

Basin features
- Progression: Nidda→ Main→ Rhine→ North Sea

Wehrbach is a small river in Hesse, Germany. It flows into the Nidda near Florstadt.

== See also ==
- List of rivers of Hesse
