= Eschbach (Nidda) =

River of Hesse, Germany

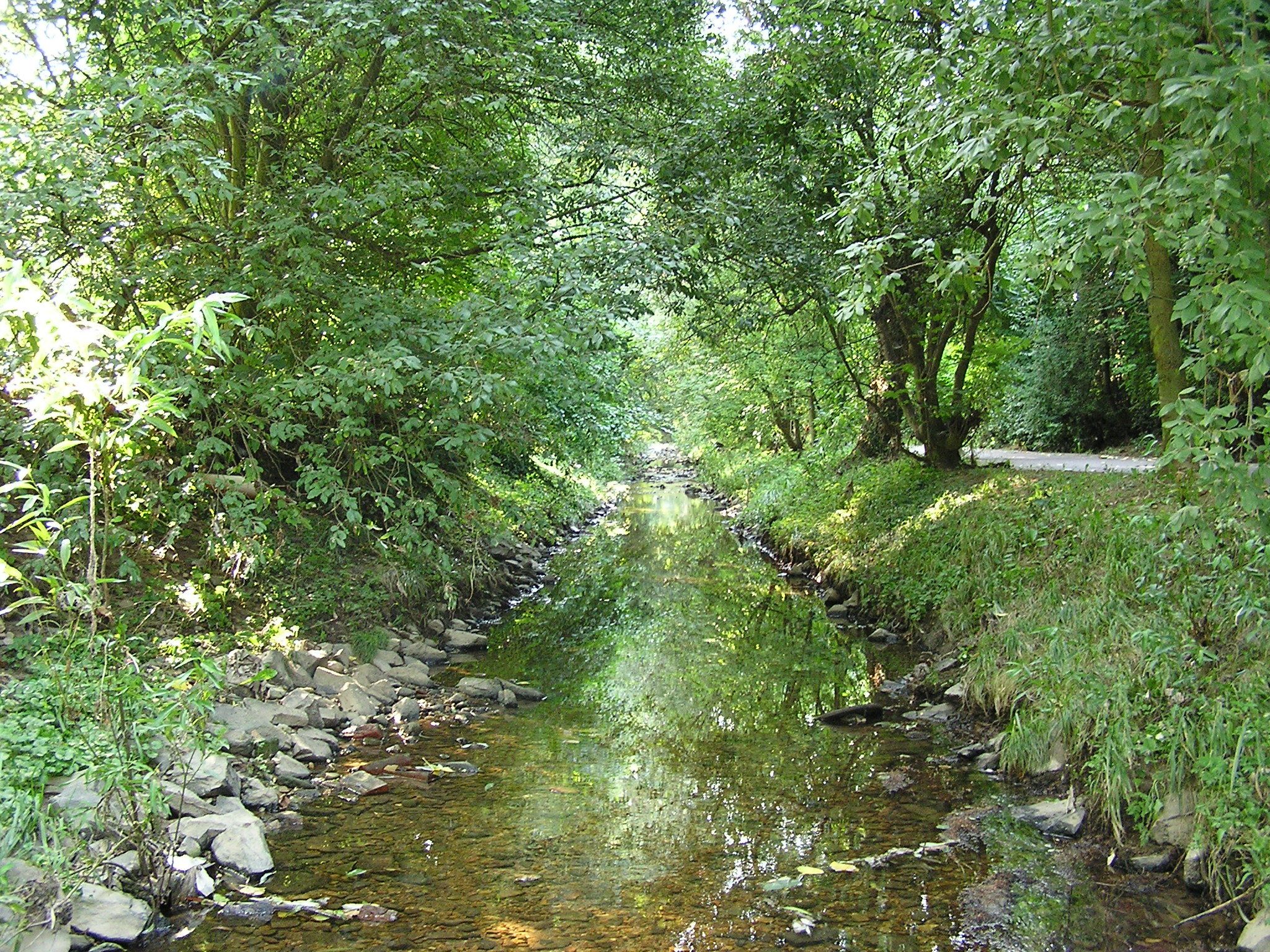

Location
- Country: Germany
- State: Hesse

Physical characteristics
- Mouth
  - location: Nidda
  - coordinates: 50°10′52″N 8°41′53″E
- Length: 8.1 km (5.0 mi)

Basin features
- Progression: Nidda→ Main→ Rhine→ North Sea

Eschbach (German pronunciation: [ˈɛʃbax]) is a river of Hesse, Germany. It is a tributary of the Nidda near Bad Vilbel. From the confluence of its source rivers Dornbach and Heuchelbach to its outflow into the Nidda, is 8.1 km long.

== See also ==
- List of rivers of Hesse
