= Dornbach (Eschbach) =

River in Hesse, Germany

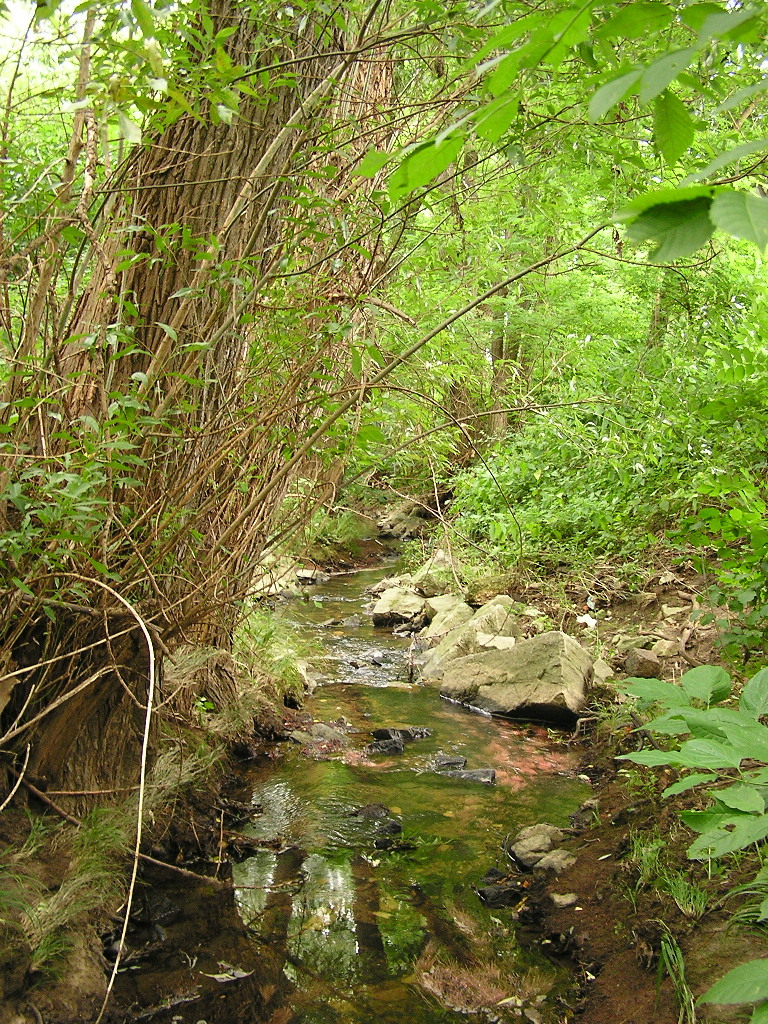
- The “Eschbach” in Bad Homburg, Germany, 8 August 2006

Location
- Country: Germany
- State: Hesse

Physical characteristics
- Mouth
  - location: Eschbach
  - coordinates: 50.2208°N 08.6265°E
- Length: 9.9 km (6.2 mi)

Basin features
- Progression: Eschbach→ Nidda→ Main→ Rhine→ North Sea

Dornbach (in its upper course: Kaltes Wasser) is a river of Hesse, Germany. It flows into the Eschbach in Bad Homburg vor der Höhe.

== See also ==
- List of rivers of Hesse
