= Stefan Jagsch =

German politician

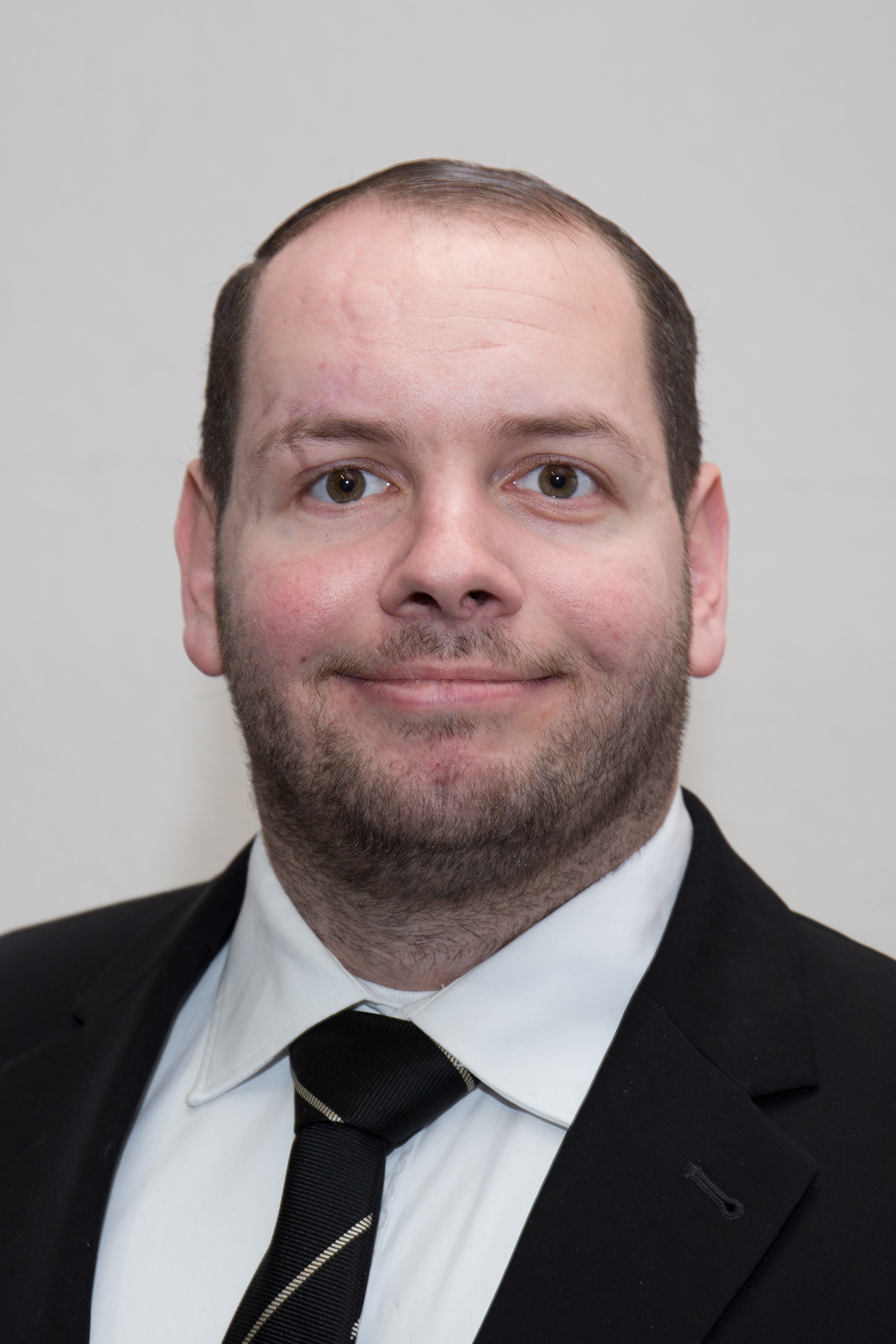
Stefan Jagsch in 2017.

Stefan Jagsch (born 8 August 1986 in Hanau) is a German politician from the extreme-right National Democratic Party of Germany.

In September 2019 he was unanimously elected as representative of Waldsiedlung (Altenstadt, Hesse), which led to irritation in other parties at national level. He was eventually removed by the town council after it reversed its decision in a controversial plebiscite of seven to one among the eight members on the council; he was the sole dissenter. Jagsch has vowed to take legal action in response to the decision to remove him from the town council.
