= Gierbach =

River in Germany

Location
- Country: Germany
- State: Hesse

Physical characteristics
- Mouth
  - location: Nidda
  - coordinates: 50.4727°N 9.0803°E
- Length: 10.5 km (6.5 mi)

Basin features
- Progression: Nidda→ Main→ Rhine→ North Sea

Gierbach is a river of Hesse, Germany. It flows into the Nidda in Rainrod.

== See also ==
- List of rivers of Hesse
