= Erlenbach (Nidda) =

River in Germany

Location
- Country: Germany
- State: Hesse

Physical characteristics
- Mouth
  - location: Nidda
  - coordinates: 50.1786°N 8.7214°E
- Length: 30.0 km (18.6 mi)
- Basin size: 86 km^{2} (33 sq mi)

Basin features
- Progression: Nidda→ Main→ Rhine→ North Sea

Erlenbach (German: [ˈɛʁlənbax]) is a river of Hesse, Germany. It flows into the Nidda in Bad Vilbel.

== See also ==
- List of rivers of Hesse
