= Hohensteinerbach =

River in Germany

Location
- Country: Germany
- States: Hesse

Physical characteristics
- Mouth
  - location: Nidda
  - coordinates: 50.4120°N 9.0153°E

Basin features
- Progression: Nidda→ Main→ Rhine→ North Sea

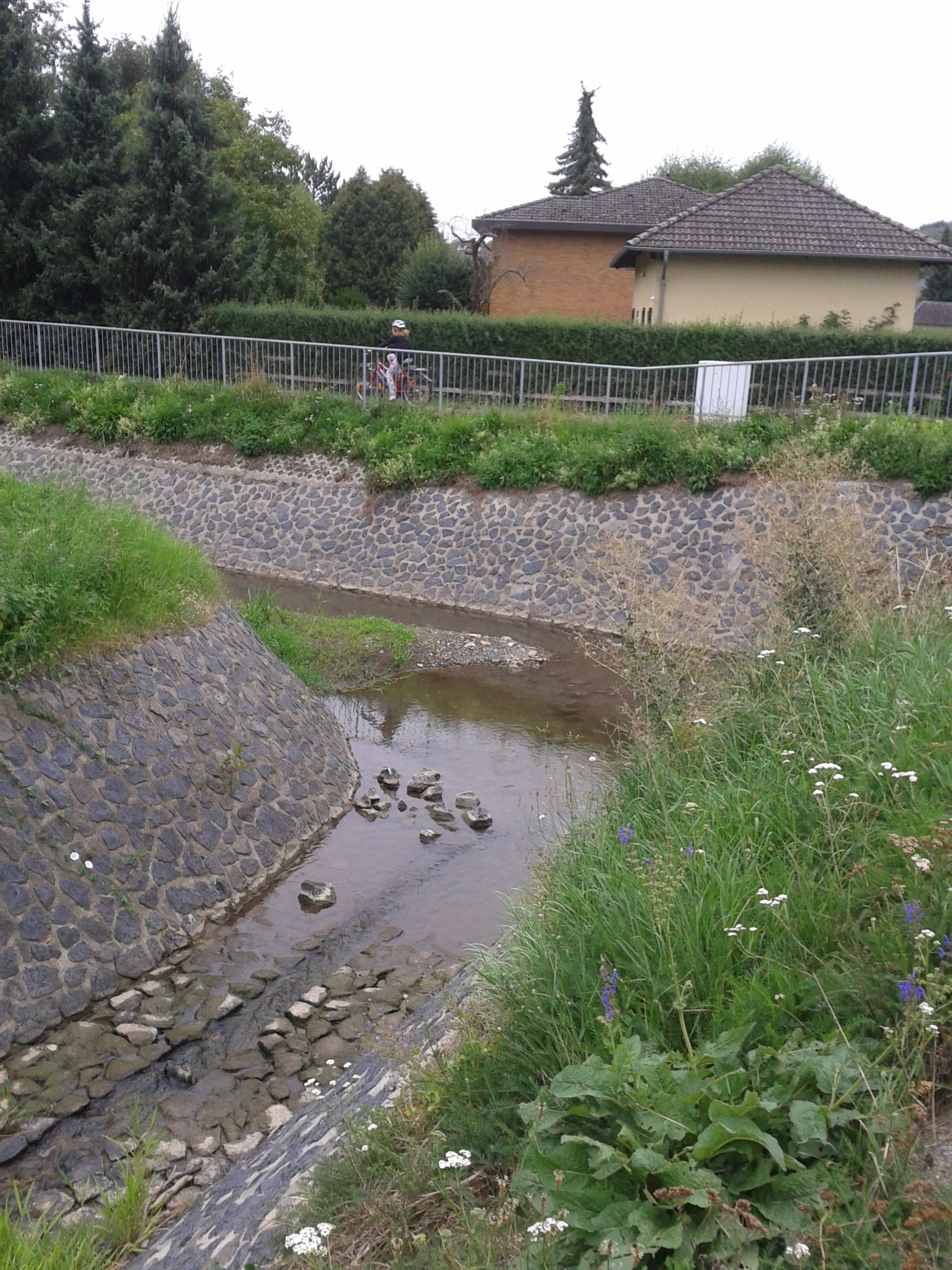

The Hohensteinerbach (with Haißbach) is an almost 6.5 km long left and south-eastern tributary of the Nidda in the Wetterau region of Hesse.

== Geography ==
=== Quellbäche ===
The Hohensteinerbach is formed by the confluence of the Haißbach and the Buchborngraben, east of the Nidda district of Michelnau.

=== Haißbach ===
The Haißbach is the 2.2 km long, north-eastern and right-hand tributary. The name Haißbach is falling out of use, so many people refer to the whole stream as Hohensteinerbach.

The stream flows south-west through the woodland meadows of the reserve and joins the Buchborngraben at the Häuserwiese meadow at an altitude of about 370 metres above sea level.

==== Buchborngraben ====
The Buchborngraben is the 2.5 km long, southern and left source stream. It is also considered by many to be a tributary of the Hohensteinerbach.

==== Course ====
The resulting stream, the Hohensteinerbach, flows through the nature reserve for just under a kilometre through mixed woodland and then through the village of Michelnau. There, in the village, it is fed first on the left by a meadow ditch and then on the other side by the Mörsbach. After leaving the village, it crosses under the L 3185 and continues through fields and meadows. At the Liebmühle, the river joins the Liebholzgraben on the left. The Hohensteinerbach now flows through mixed woodland to the north, past a quarry, then to the south, past two small ponds, before reaching the outskirts of the town of Nidda.

It crosses Hohensteiner Straße and finally, in the town of Nidda, flows from the left into the Flutgraben, a tributary of the Nidda, at about 135 metres above sea level.

=== Spring brooks and tributaries ===
- Haißbach (right-hand spring brook), 2.2 km
- Buchborngraben (left spring brook), 2.5 km
- Mörsbach [place code (GKZ) 248151826] (right), 0.8 km
- Liebholzgraben [place code (GKZ) 248151828] (left), 0.6 km

=== Places ===
The Hohensteinerbach flows through the following villages:

- Nidda-Michelnau
- Nidda

== See also ==
- List of rivers of Hesse
