= Natalie Pawlik =

German politician

Natalie Pawlik MdB
- Pawlik in 2021

Member of the Bundestag; from Hesse
- Incumbent
- Assumed office 26 October 2021
- Preceded by: Bernd Siebert
- Constituency: Wetterau I (2021–2025); State list (2025–present)

Personal details
- Born: 26 August 1992 (age 34) Vostok, Abatsky District, Tyumen Oblast, Russia
- Party: Social Democratic
- Education: University of Giessen

Natalie Pawlik (born 26 August 1992) is a German politician (SPD). She has been a member of the German Bundestag since 2021 and, since 2025, has served as the Federal Government Commissioner for Migration, Refugees, and Integration as well as Minister of State at the Federal Ministry of Labour and Social Affairs. Prior to that, from 2022 to 2025, she was the Federal Government Commissioner for Matters Related to Ethnic German Resettlers and National Minorities.

== Early life and education ==
Pawlik came to Germany with her family when she was six years old. After a short time in the initial reception camp in Friedland, they moved to Bad Nauheim in the Wetteraukreis of Hesse, where she grew up. Her schooldays began at the Wilhelmskirche elementary school. After graduating from secondary school, she obtained her vocational diploma in design at the Johann-Philipp-Reis Schule in Friedberg. This was followed by a bachelor's degree in history and cultural studies and a master's degree in society and cultures of modernity at the Justus Liebig University in Giessen.

Alongside her studies, Pawlik began working in the parliamentary office of Member of the European Parliament Udo Bullmann. Since 2020, she has headed Bullmann's constituency office in Frankfurt am Main. She likes to emphasize that many social democratic reforms, such as the opening of education systems, BAföG and the abolition of tuition fees in Hesse, made her life's journey possible.

She was active as a district school spokesperson in the Wetterau state student council, where at that time she found her political home with the SPD. At university she was active in the student parliament and as a speaker for university policy in the General Students' Committee.

== Political career ==
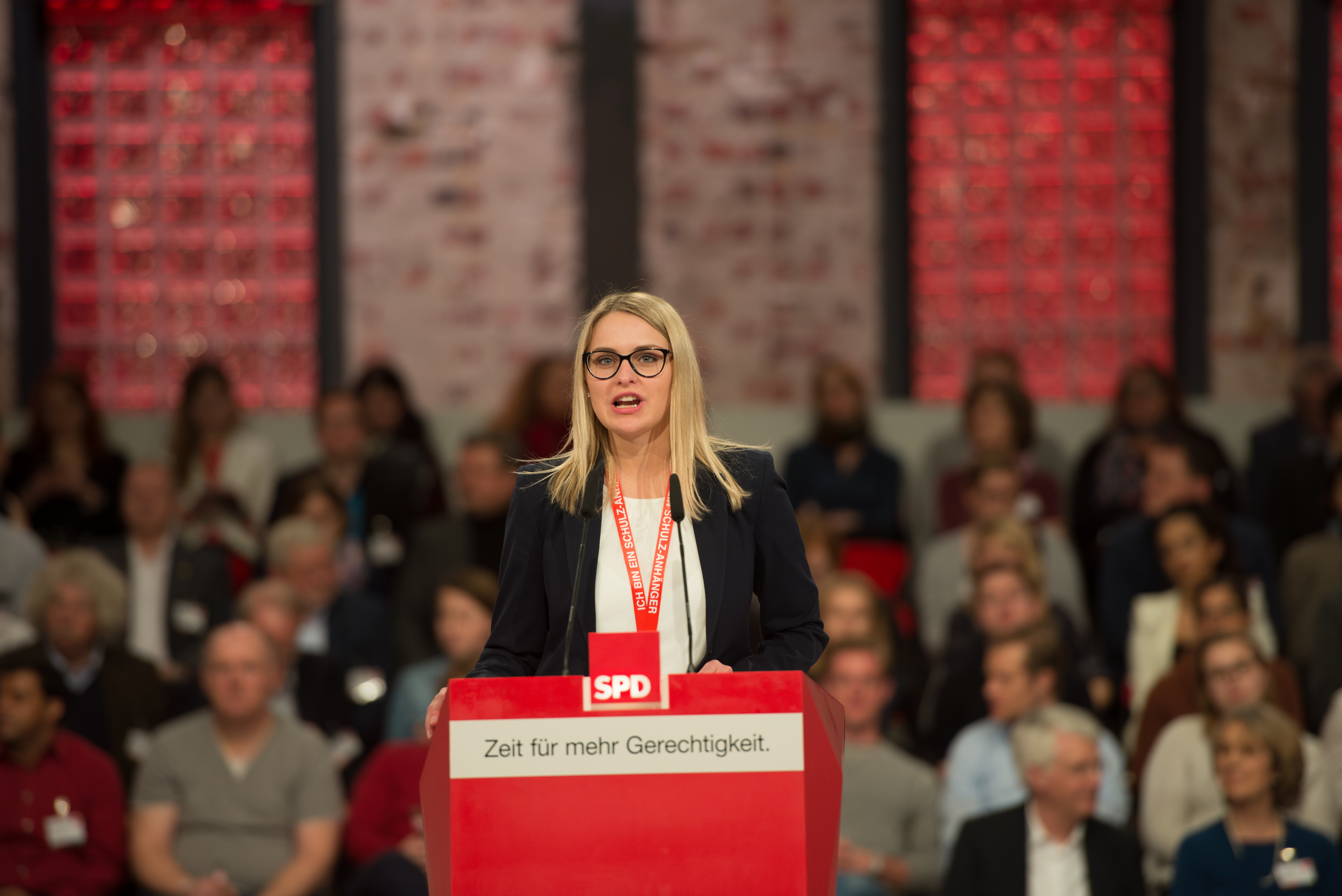
Natalie Pawlik at the extraordinary federal party conference of the SPD in Berlin in March 2017

=== Career in local politics ===
Since the 2011 local elections in Hesse, Pawlik has been a city councillor in Bad Nauheim. Together with Sinan Sert, she is chairwoman of the SPD parliamentary group and a member of the main and finance committee. She was elected to the Wetterau district council in the 2016 local elections in Hesse. There she worked in the areas of youth, social affairs, family and health and advocated for equality and at the youth welfare commission.

=== Member of the German Parliament (2021–present) ===
In the 2021 national election, Pawlik ran in the constituency Wetterau I, winning the constituency with 29.7% and becoming the directly elected member of the 20th German Bundestag.

In parliament, Pawlik has since been serving on the Committee on Labour and Social Affairs. In this capacity, she is her parliamentary group’s rapporteur for social security benefits and training.

Within her parliamentary group, Pawlik belongs to the Parliamentary Left, a left-wing movement.

On 14 April 2022, Pawlik was appointed by Federal Minister of the Interior and Community Nancy Faeser to succeed Bernd Fabritius as the Federal Government Commissioner for Matters Related to Ethnic German Resettlers and National Minorities.

In the negotiations to form a Grand Coalition under the leadership of Friedrich Merz's Christian Democrats (CDU together with the Bavarian CSU) and the SPD following the 2025 German elections, Pawlik was part of the SPD delegation in the working group on labour and social affairs, led by Carsten Linnemann, Stephan Stracke and Katja Mast.

== Other activities ==
- German United Services Trade Union (ver.di), Member
