= Michelbach (Nidda) =

River in Germany

Location
- Country: Germany
- States: Hesse

Physical characteristics
- Mouth
  - location: Nidda
  - coordinates: 50.4945°N 9.1159°E

Basin features
- Progression: Nidda→ Main→ Rhine→ North Sea

Michelbach is a river of Hesse, Germany. It is a left tributary of the Nidda near Schotten.

== See also ==
- List of rivers of Hesse
