= Oswin Veith =

German politician (born 1961)

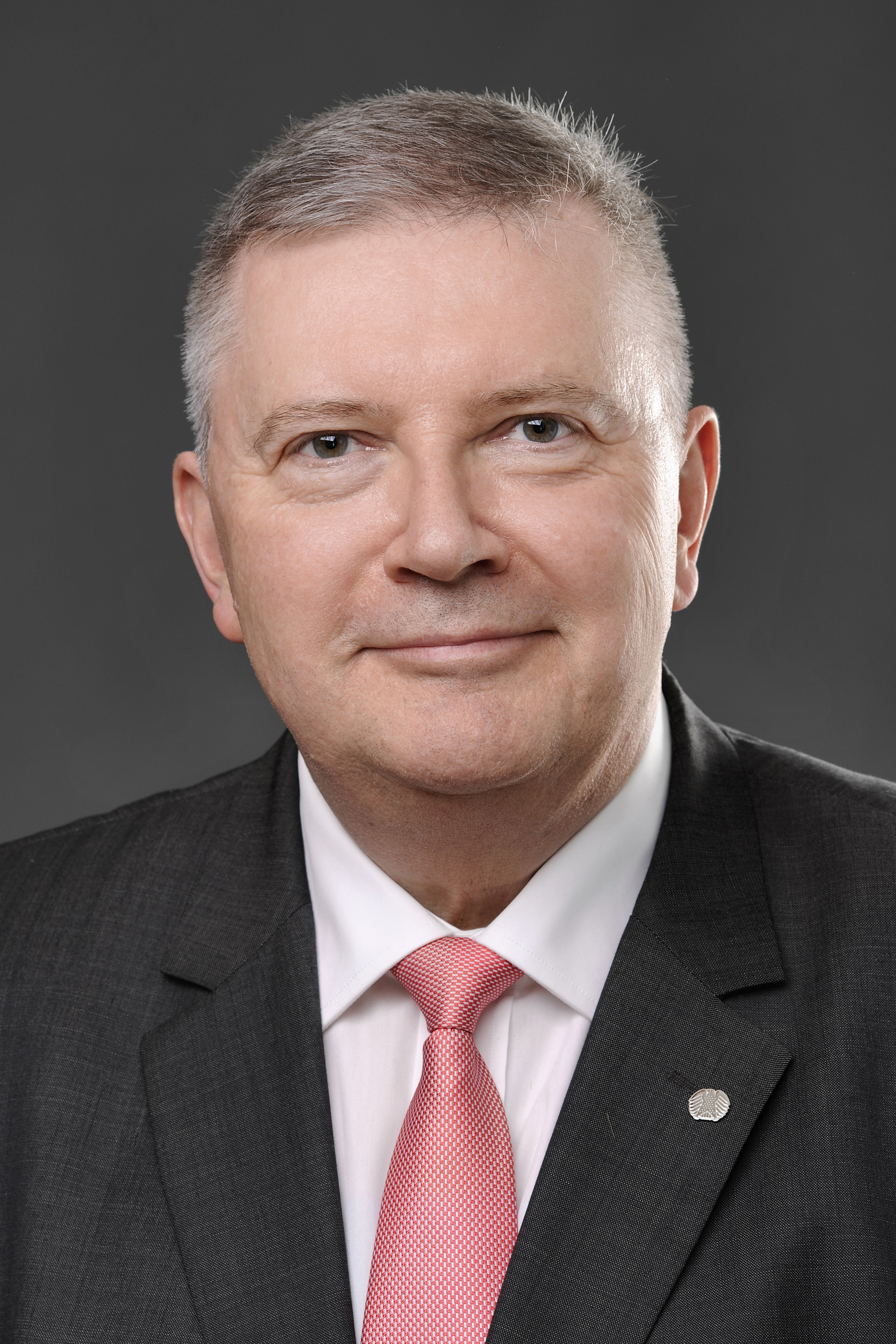
- Veith in 2015

Member of the Bundestag; for Wetterau I
- In office 22 October 2013 – 1 March 2020
- Preceded by: Bernd Siebert
- Succeeded by: Bernd Siebert

Personal details
- Born: 16 May 1961 (age 65) Ober-Wöllstadt, West Germany
- Party: Christian Democratic Union
- Children: 1
- Education: University of Giessen

Oswin Veith (born 16 May 1961) is a German politician who represents the CDU. He was a member of the German Bundestag from September 2013 to March 2020.

Veith is married and has one child.

Incumbent
Other offices
Preceded by Roderich Kiesewetter	President of the Reservist Association of Deutsche Bundeswehr; 2016–2019	Succeeded by Patrick Sensburg
