= Eichelbach (Nidda) =

River in Germany

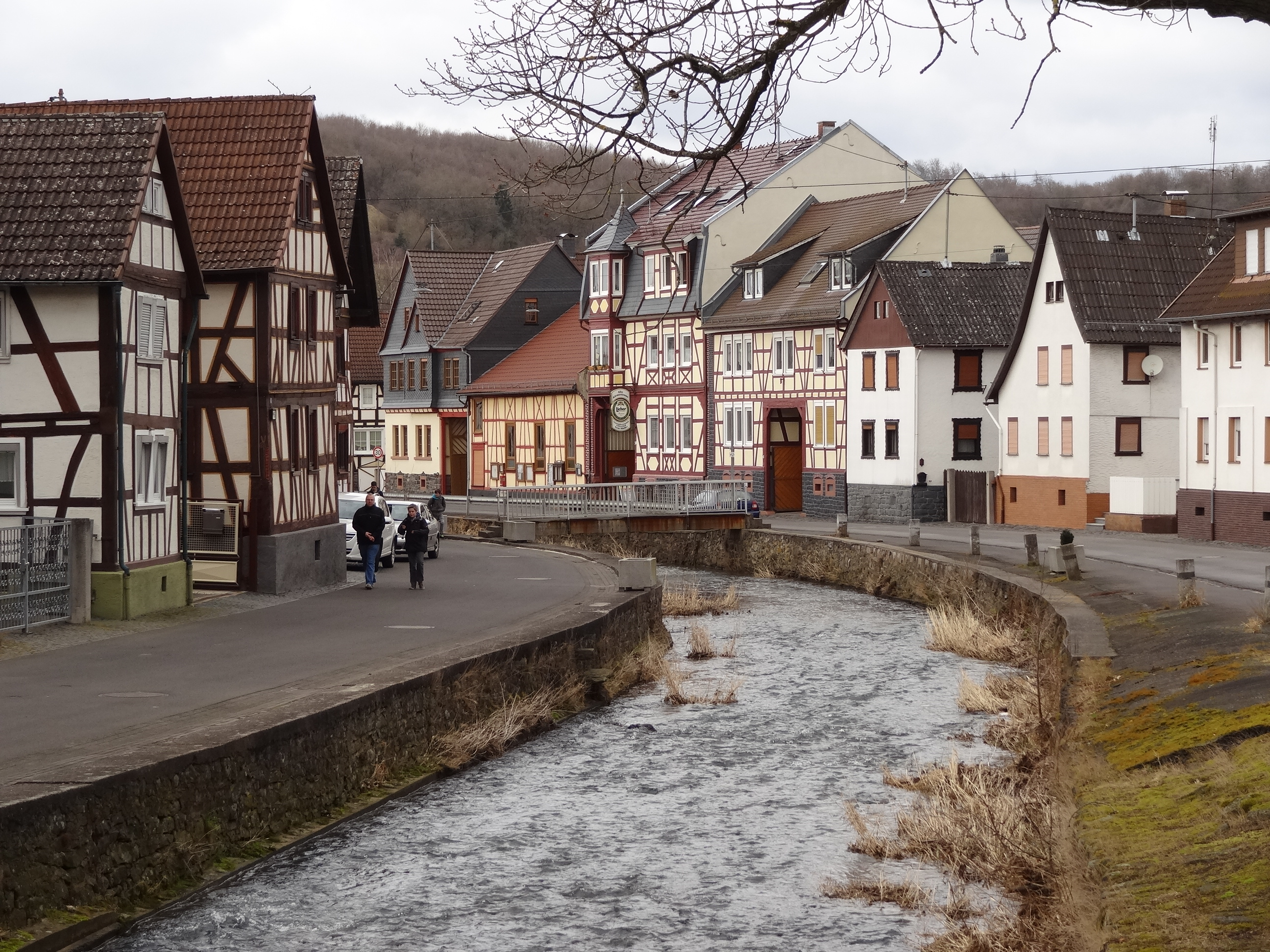
- The Eichelbach in the Nidda district Eichelsdorf

Location
- Country: Germany
- State: Hesse

Physical characteristics
- Source: Vogelsberg north of Hoherodskopf, east of Schotten (Breungeshain)
  - elevation: 700 m (2,300 ft)
- Mouth: Nidda (Eichelsdorf), into the Nidda river
  - coordinates: 50°27′18″N 9°3′18″E
  - elevation: 165 m (541 ft)
- Length: 18.2 km (11.3 mi)
- Basin size: 37.6 km^{2} (14.5 sq mi)
- Discharge
  - average: .5787 m^{3}/s (20.44 cu ft/s)

Basin features
- Tributaries
  - left: Eckardsbach (Waidbach), Schandwiesenbach
- Progression: Nidda→ Main→ Rhine→ North Sea

The Eichelbach is a river of Hesse, Germany. It is a tributary of the Nidda, 18 kilometres (11 mi) long.

== Geography ==
=== Course ===
The Eichelbach has its source in Vogelsberg, north of the Hoherodskopfes and east of the town Schotten-Breungeshain. It discharges into the Nidda river at the town of Nidda. Since the summer of 2009 a retention basin is being built upstream from Eichelsdorf by the Nidda water board, with a capacity of 390,000 cubic metres (320 acre⋅ft), to protect the villages on the Eichelbach and the Nidda.

=== Villages ===
The Eichelbach flows through the following villages:

- Breungeshain
- Busenbornn
- Eschenrod
- Wingershausen
- Eichelsachsen
- Eichelsdorf

=== Tributaries ===
- Eckardsbach (Waidbach) (left)
- Schandwiesenbach (left)

=== Water quality ===
The water quality of the Eichelback is deemed good.

== See also ==
- List of rivers of Hesse
