= Urselbach =

River in Germany

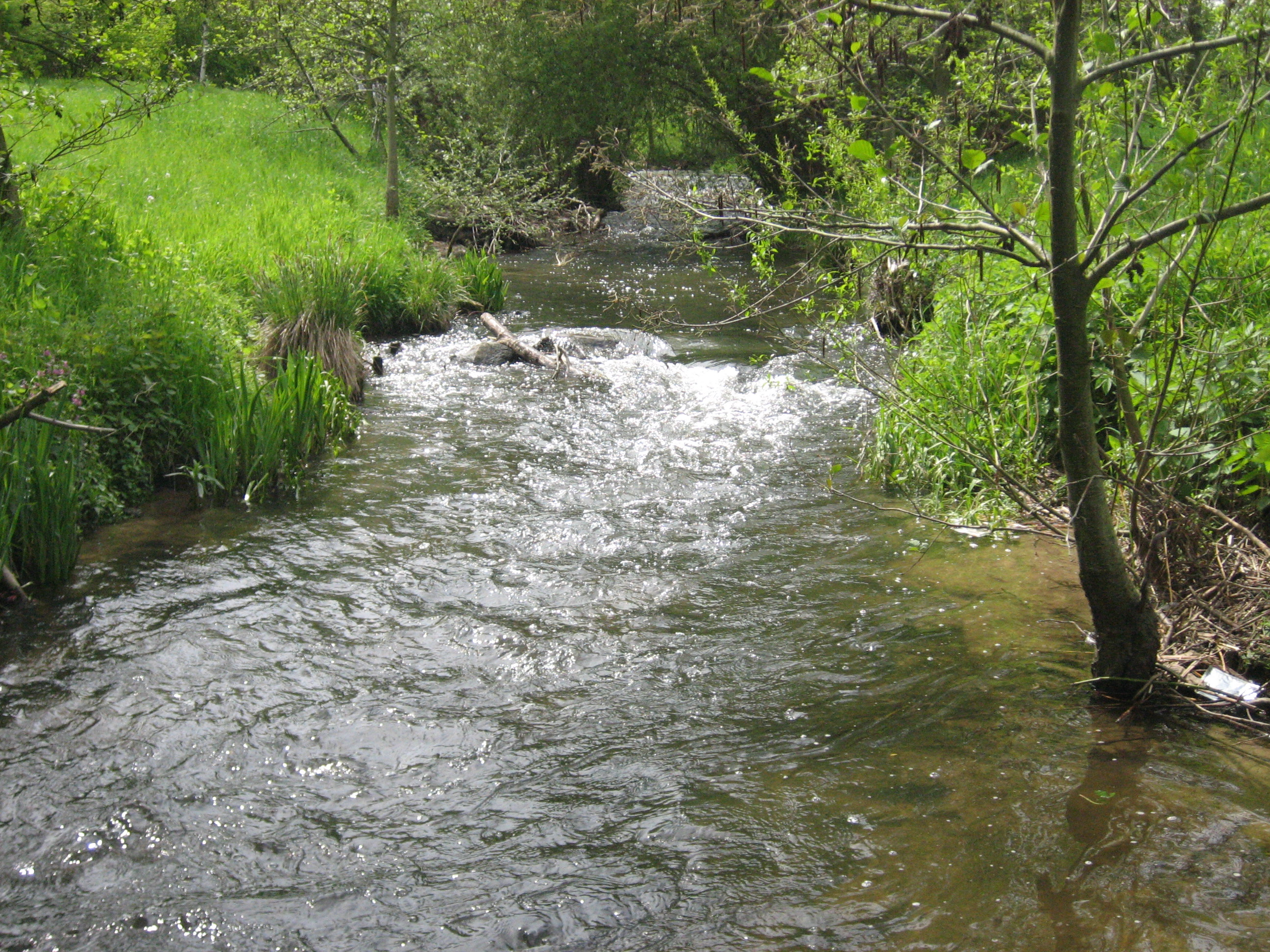

Location
- Country: Germany
- State: Hesse

Physical characteristics
- Mouth
  - location: Nidda
  - coordinates: 50.1625°N 8.6522°E
- Length: 16.1 km (10.0 mi)

Basin features
- Progression: Nidda→ Main→ Rhine→ North Sea

Urselbach is a river of Hesse, Germany. It flows into the Nidda in Heddernheim.

== See also ==
- List of rivers of Hesse
