= Graswiesenbach =

River in Germany

Location
- Country: Germany
- States: Hesse

Physical characteristics
- Mouth
  - location: Nidda
  - coordinates: 50.5220°N 9.1727°E

Basin features
- Progression: Nidda→ Main→ Rhine→ North Sea

Graswiesenbach is a small river of Hesse, Germany. It flows into the Nidda in Rudingshain. It originates in the Vogelsberg mountain at an altitude of about 713 m above sea level just north of the Rudingshainer Flösser.

It flows in a west-southwestern direction, first through forest and then through grassland before finally flowing into the Nidda. At this stage the river is at an altitude of about 423 m above sea level.

Graswiesenbach is approx. 4.0 km long and ends about 290 altitude meters below its origin, thus it has an average bottom slope of about 73 ‰.

== See also ==
- List of rivers of Hesse
