= Hohlbach (Nidda) =

River in Germany

Location
- Country: Germany
- States: Hesse

Physical characteristics
- Mouth
  - location: Nidda
  - coordinates: 50.5125°N 9.1425°E

Basin features
- Progression: Nidda→ Main→ Rhine→ North Sea

The Hohlbach (German pronunciation: [ˈhoːlbax]) is a small river of Hesse, Germany. It flows into the Nidda near Schotten.

== See also ==
- List of rivers of Hesse
