= Steinbach (Nidda) =

River in Hesse, Germany

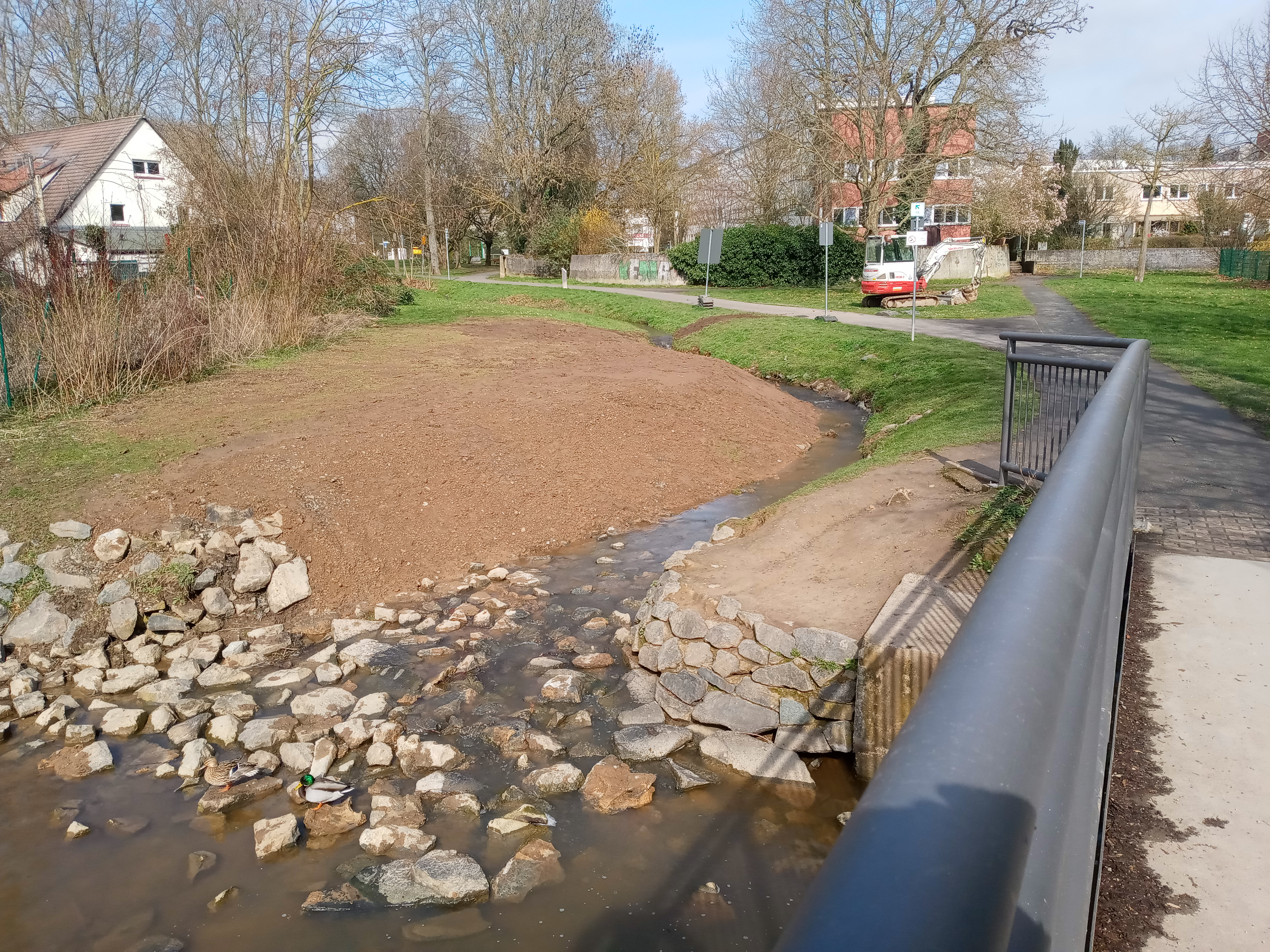

Location
- Country: Germany
- State: Hesse

Physical characteristics
- Mouth
  - location: Nidda
  - coordinates: 50°09′01″N 8°37′32″E

Basin features
- Progression: Nidda→ Main→ Rhine→ North Sea

Steinbach is a small river of Hesse, Germany. It is a right tributary of the Nidda in Praunheim.

== See also ==
- List of rivers of Hesse
