= Kalbach (Nidda) =

River in Germany

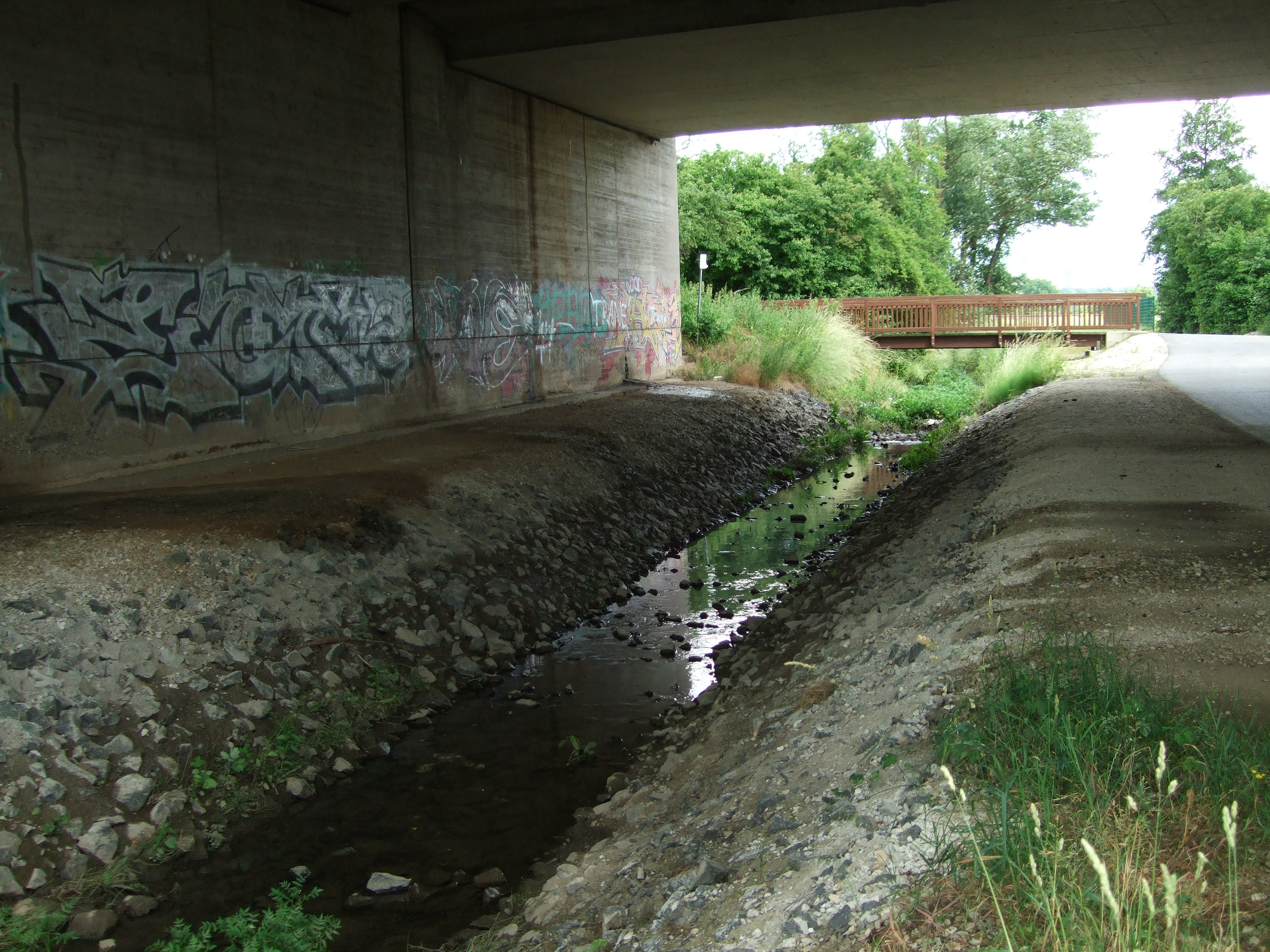
- The Kalbach in Frankfurt-Kalbach

Location
- Country: Germany
- State: Hesse

Physical characteristics
- Source
  - location: Bommersheim
- Mouth
  - location: Nidda in Bonames
  - coordinates: 50°10′42″N 8°39′52″E
- Length: 5.3 km (3.3 mi)

Basin features
- Progression: Nidda→ Main→ Rhine→ North Sea

The Kalbach is a stream or small river of Hesse, Germany. It flows into the Nidda from the right in Bonames. The Kalbach rises near the town of Oberursel.

== See also ==
- List of rivers of Hesse
