= Limeshain =

- Municipality
- Coat of arms

- Location of Limeshain within Wetteraukreis district
- Interactive map of Limeshain
- Location within Germany Location within Hesse
- Coordinates: 50°15′38″N 8°59′26″E
- Country: Germany
- State: Hesse
- Admin. region: Darmstadt
- District: Wetteraukreis
- Subdivisions: 3 districts

Government
  - Mayor (2020–26): Adolf Ludwig (SPD)

Area
  - Total: 12.5 km^{2} (4.8 sq mi)
- Elevation: 127 m (417 ft)

Population (2025-12-31)
  - Total: 5,542
  - Density: 443/km^{2} (1,150/sq mi)
- Time zone: UTC+01:00 (CET)
  - Summer (DST): UTC+02:00 (CEST)
- Postal codes: 63694
- Dialling codes: 06047, 06048
- Vehicle registration: FB
- Website: www.limeshain.de

Limeshain (German pronunciation: [ˈliːməshaɪn]) is a municipality in the Wetteraukreis, in Hesse, Germany. It is located approximately 28 kilometers northeast of Frankfurt am Main.
