= Ulfa (river) =

River in Germany

Location
- Country: Germany
- State: Hesse

Physical characteristics
- Mouth
  - location: Nidda
  - coordinates: 50.4389°N 9.0231°E
- Length: 11.3 km (7.0 mi)

Basin features
- Progression: Nidda→ Main→ Rhine→ North Sea

Ulfa is a river of Hesse, Germany. It flows into the Nidda in Unter-Schmitten.

== See also ==
- List of rivers of Hesse
