= Salzbach (Nidda) =

River in Germany

Location
- Country: Germany
- States: Hesse

Physical characteristics
- Mouth
  - location: Nidda
  - coordinates: 50°23′22″N 8°58′25″E

Basin features
- Progression: Nidda→ Main→ Rhine→ North Sea

Salzbach is a small river of Hesse, Germany. It is a right tributary of the Nidda near Geiß-Nidda.

== See also ==
- List of rivers of Hesse
