= Ortenberg, Hesse =

Ortenberg
- Town
- Coat of arms

- Location of Ortenberg within Wetteraukreis district
- Interactive map of Ortenberg
- Location within Germany Location within Hesse
- Coordinates: 50°21′21″N 9°3′19″E
- Country: Germany
- State: Hesse
- Admin. region: Darmstadt
- District: Wetteraukreis
- Subdivisions: 10 districts

Government
  - Mayor (2018–24): Ulrike Pfeiffer-Pantring (SPD)

Area
  - Total: 54.7 km^{2} (21.1 sq mi)
- Elevation: 136 m (446 ft)

Population (2025-12-31)
  - Total: 8,351
  - Density: 153/km^{2} (395/sq mi)
- Time zone: UTC+01:00 (CET)
  - Summer (DST): UTC+02:00 (CEST)
- Postal codes: 63683
- Dialling codes: 06046
- Vehicle registration: FB
- Website: www.ortenberg.net

Ortenberg (German pronunciation: [ˈɔʁtn̩bɛʁk]) is a town in the Wetteraukreis district, in Hesse, Germany. It is located 22 km east of Friedberg, and 38 km northeast of Frankfurt am Main.

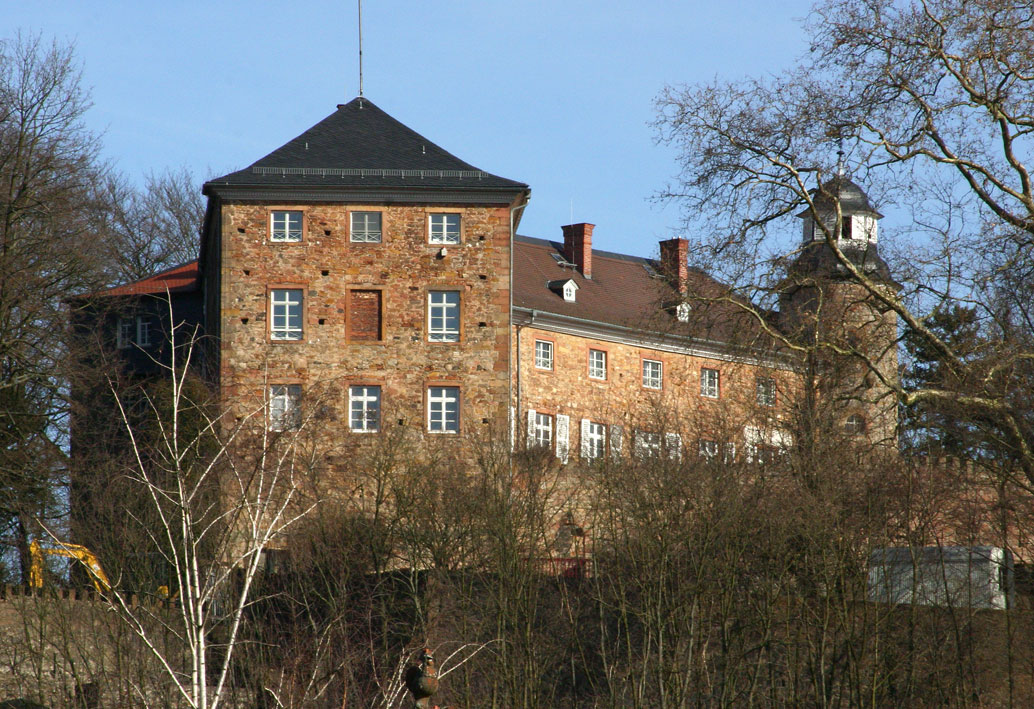
The castle of Ortenberg, Schloss Ortenberg

== Districts ==
Ortenberg consists of the following districts: Bergheim, Bleichenbach, Eckartsborn, Effolderbach, Gelnhaar, Lißberg, Ortenberg, Selters, Usenborn and Wippenbach.

== Local council ==
The elections in March 2016 showed the following results:

- Seats
- SPD 13
- CDU 9
- FWG 6
- BiO 3
