= Niddatal =

- Town
- Coat of arms

- Location of Niddatal within Wetteraukreis district
- Interactive map of Niddatal
- Location within Germany Location within Hesse
- Coordinates: 50°17′54″N 8°48′50″E
- Country: Germany
- State: Hesse
- Admin. region: Darmstadt
- District: Wetteraukreis
- Subdivisions: 4 districts

Government
  - Mayor (2020–26): Michael Hahn (CDU)

Area
  - Total: 40.25 km^{2} (15.54 sq mi)
- Elevation: 121 m (397 ft)

Population (2025-12-31)
  - Total: 9,765
  - Density: 242.6/km^{2} (628.4/sq mi)
- Time zone: UTC+01:00 (CET)
  - Summer (DST): UTC+02:00 (CEST)
- Postal codes: 61194
- Dialling codes: 06034
- Vehicle registration: FB
- Website: www.niddatal.de

Niddatal (German pronunciation: [ˈnɪdaˌtaːl], lit. 'Nidda Valley') is a town in the Wetteraukreis district in Hesse, Germany. It is located on the river Nidda, 6 km southeast of Friedberg and 22 km northeast of Frankfurt am Main.

The town is divided into four districts: Assenheim, Ilbenstadt, Kaichen, Bönstadt.

== History ==
=== Assenheim ===
Assenheim was first mentioned as a township in 1139. Assenheim Castle existed between the years 1170 – 1780. Its ruins are still visible today.

=== Ilbenstadt ===
Ilbenstadt's first mention as an Eluistat was in 818. At the time, Ilbenstadt consisted of two cloisters. Its Church St. Maria, Petrus und Paulus was elevated to Basilica Minor status in 1929 by Pope Pius XI.

=== Kaichen ===
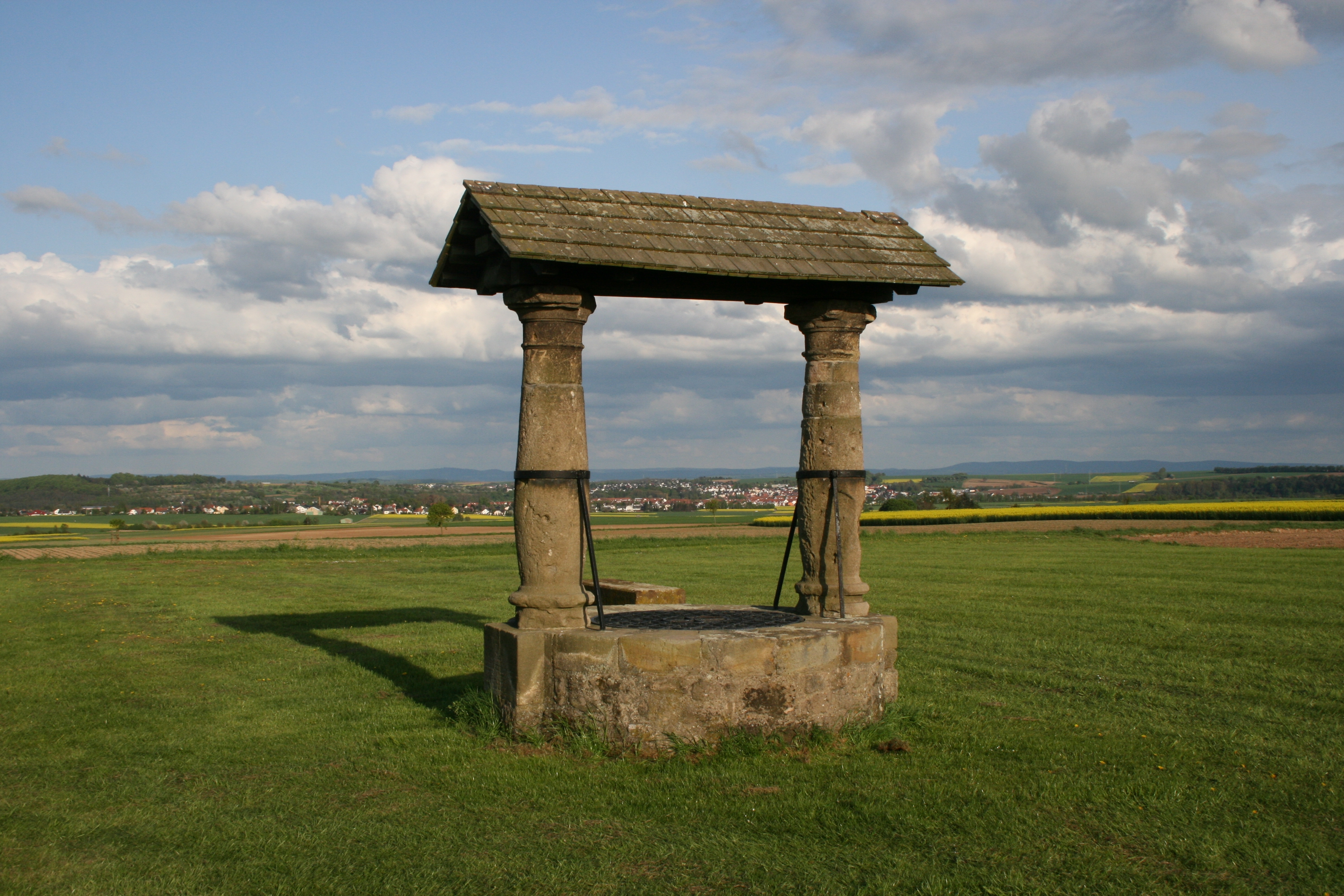
A reconstructed Roman fountain near Niddatal-Kaichen.

Kaichen was founded by a Anshelmus de Cochene in 1231. Around 1400, Kaichen's first church was built and rebuilt in 1737 and a baptismal font was added. One of the most popular places in Kaichen is the Gericht zu Kaichen which was a court able to declare to a death penalty.

=== Bönstadt ===
Bönstadt first was the property of the counts of Falkenstein, and later of Isenburg-Büdingen, which made Bönstadt belong to Assenheim castle. Documentary, in former times Bönstadt had meant Benstad in 1184. In 1970, the townships of Assenheim, Ilbenstadt, Bönstadt and Kaichen merged to form modern-day Niddatal. As of January 2009, the town's population stands at 9,360. The area is characterised by agricultural activities, but in its former past, trade played a fundamental role in the local economy.

== Politics ==
Local elections in Niddatal have yielded the following results:

Parties		% 2016	Seats; 2016	% 2011	Seats; 2011	% 2006	Seats; 2006	% 2001	Seats; 2001
CDU	Christian Democratic Union of Germany	30,1	9	39,7	12	42,3	13	39,9	12
SPD	Social Democratic Party of Germany	44,6	14	35,5	11	37,1	12	35,9	11
GRÜNE	Alliance 90/The Greens	8,6	3	15,5	5	7,2	2	8,5	3
FWG	Freie Wählergemeinschaft Niddatal (Free Voters Niddatal)	—	—	7,7	2	9,1	3	15,7	5
FDP	Free Democratic Party (Germany)	11,5	3	1,6	1	4,3	1	—	—
LINKE	The Left (Germany)	5,2	2	—	—	—	—	—	—
Total		100,0	31	100,0	31	100,0	31	100,0	31
Turnout in %		56,9		49,0		47,2		56,6	

== Sights ==
=== Ilbenstadt ===
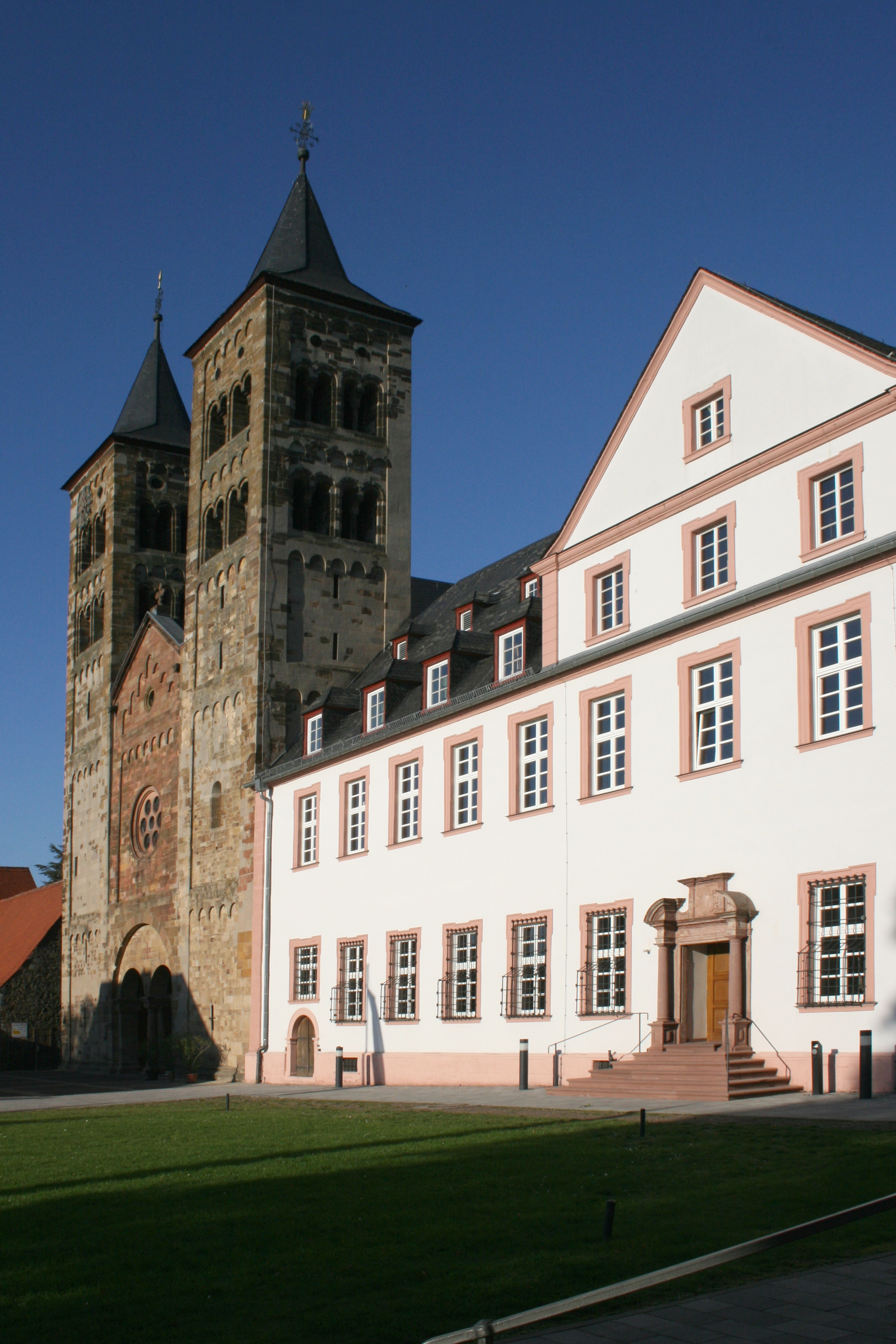
Basilica Maria, St. Petrus und Paulus.

Basilica Maria St. Petrus und Paulus was donated by St. Gottfried von Cappenberg in 1123. St. Cappenberg was interred there in 1127 and Pope Pius XI elevated the Church to Basilica Minor status in 1929. Due to secularization in 1803, its cloister was abrogated. After World War II, the Roman Catholic Diocese of Mainz repurchased the cloister from the state Hesse.

Today the church is a landmark of Ilbenstadt which is also visible because of the eternalisation on town emblem. Regionally, the church is also known as Dom der Wetterau (cathedral of Wetterau)
