= Wetteraukreis =

Coordinates: 50°22′N 8°55′E

- District
- Flag Coat of arms
- Country: Germany
- State: Hesse
- Adm. region: Darmstadt
- Capital: Friedberg

Government
  - District admin.: Jan Weckler (CDU)

Area
  - Total: 1,101.71 km^{2} (425.37 sq mi)

Population (31 December 2025)
  - Total: 310,526
  - Density: 281.858/km^{2} (730.009/sq mi)
- Time zone: UTC+01:00 (CET)
  - Summer (DST): UTC+02:00 (CEST)
- Vehicle registration: FB, BÜD
- Website: www.wetteraukreis.de

The Wetteraukreis is a Kreis (district) in the middle of Hesse, Germany. Neighbouring districts are Landkreis Gießen, Vogelsbergkreis, Main-Kinzig-Kreis, district-free Stadt Frankfurt, Hochtaunuskreis and Lahn-Dill-Kreis.

== History ==
The district was created in 1972 when the two districts Friedberg and Büdingen were merged.

== Geography ==
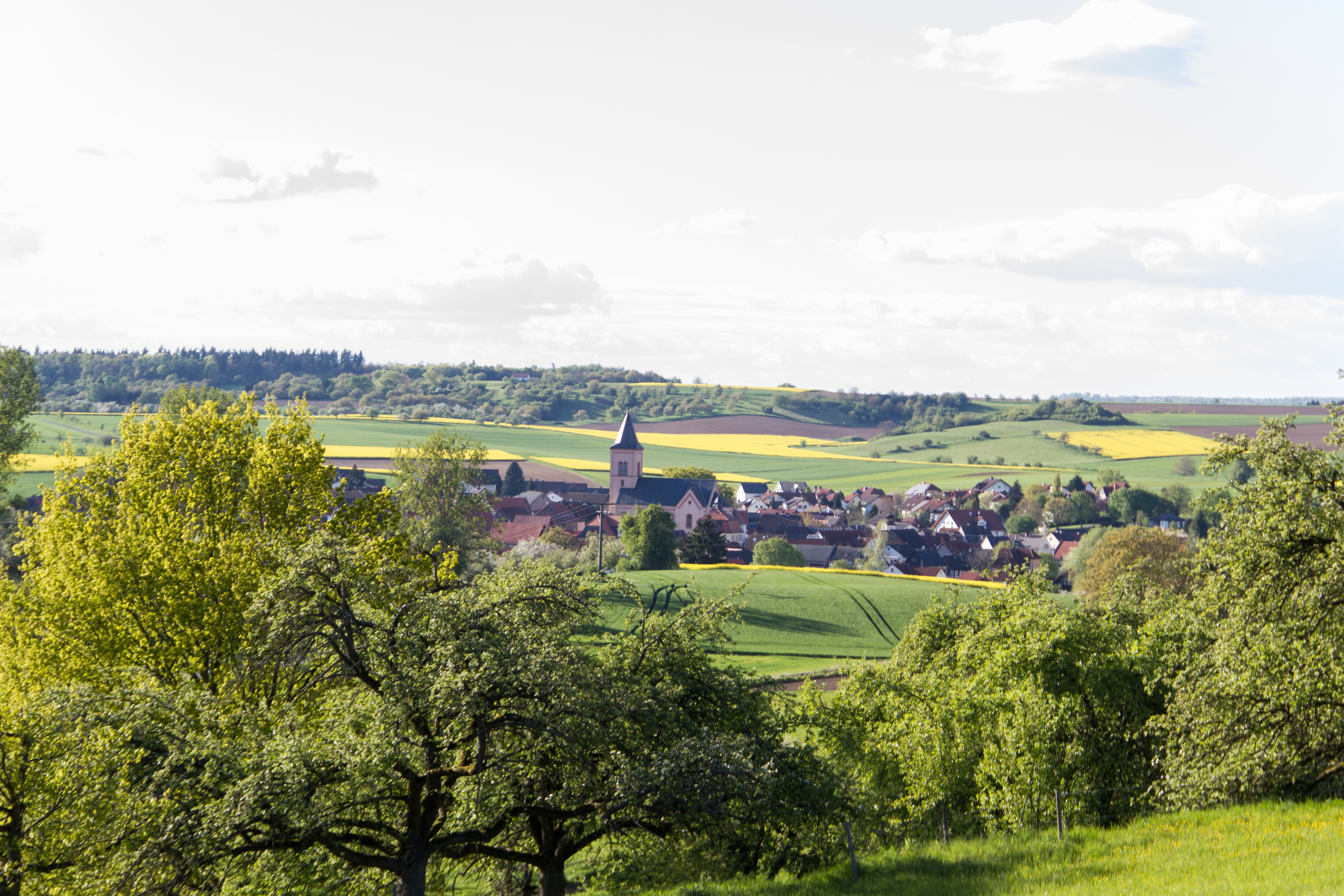
Area view of Eckartshausen

The district is located between the Taunus mountains and the Vogelsberg volcanic mountain. The main rivers of the district are the Nidda River and the Wetter River.

== Coat of arms ==
The imperial eagle in the top of the coat of arms was chosen because the Wetterau was imperial possession in the past. The bars in the bottom derive from the lords of Isenburg-Büdingen, who owned most of the area. The wavy line depicts the river Wetter which flows through the capital Friedberg.

== Towns and municipalities ==
Clickable map of towns and municipalities in the district

Towns
1. Bad Nauheim
2. Bad Vilbel
3. Büdingen
4. Butzbach
5. Florstadt
6. Friedberg
7. Gedern
8. Karben
9. Münzenberg
10. Nidda
11. Niddatal
12. Ortenberg
13. Reichelsheim
14. Rosbach vor der Höhe
Municipalities
1. Altenstadt
2. Echzell
3. Glauburg
4. Hirzenhain
5. Kefenrod
6. Limeshain
7. Ober-Mörlen
8. Ranstadt
9. Rockenberg
10. Wölfersheim
11. Wöllstadt

== Transport ==
Rhein-Main-Verkehrsverbund (RMV)

The district is located in the area of the public transport association Rhein-Main-Verkehrsverbund (RMV).
