= Ranstadt =

- Municipality
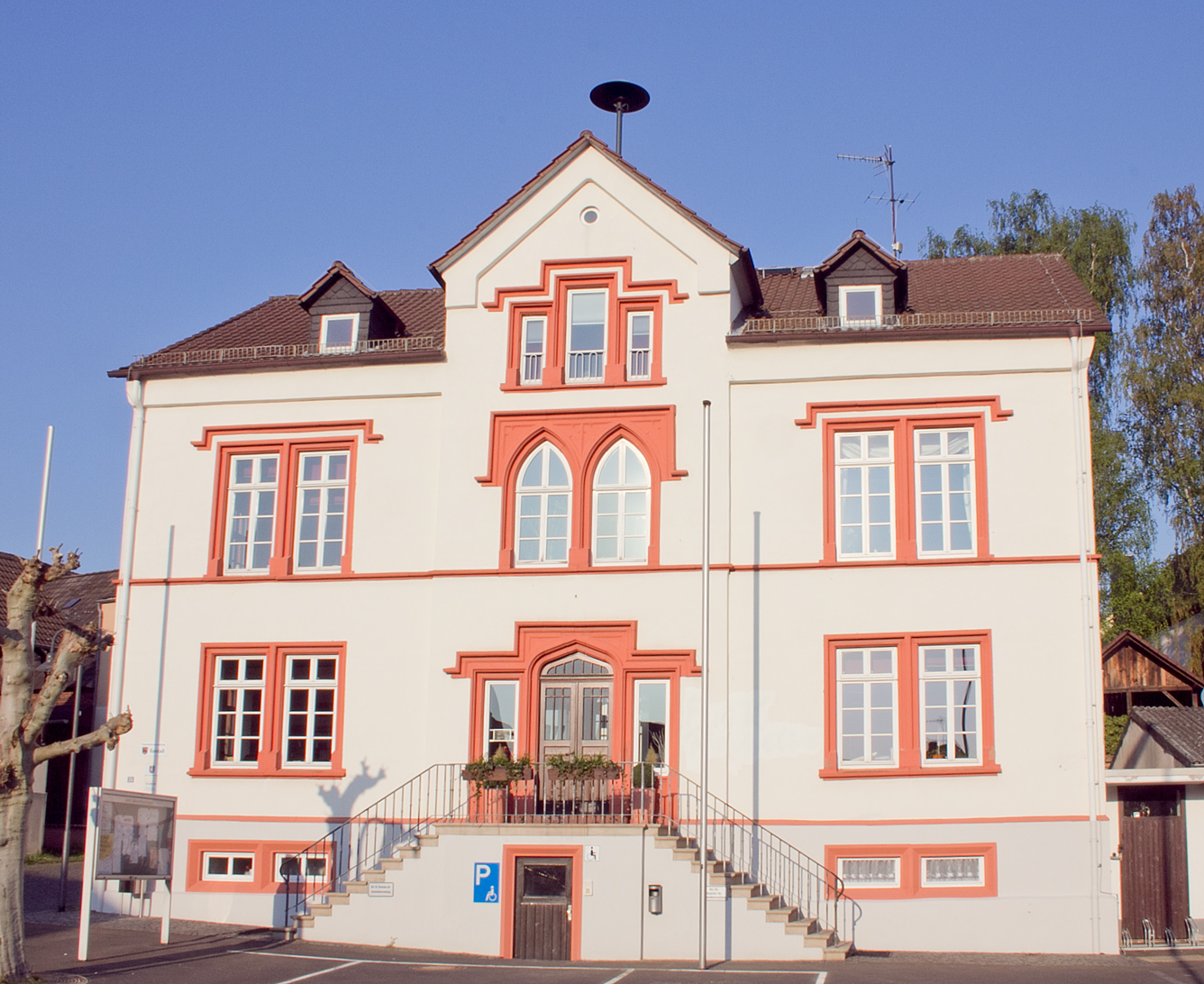
- Town hall

- Coat of arms

- Location of Ranstadt within Wetteraukreis district
- Interactive map of Ranstadt
- Location within Germany Location within Hesse
- Coordinates: 50°21′27″N 8°59′3″E
- Country: Germany
- State: Hesse
- Admin. region: Darmstadt
- District: Wetteraukreis
- Subdivisions: 5 districts

Government
  - Mayor (2021–27): Cäcilia Reichert-Dietzel (SPD)

Area
  - Total: 34.26 km^{2} (13.23 sq mi)
- Elevation: 201 m (659 ft)

Population (2025-12-31)
  - Total: 5,376
  - Density: 156.9/km^{2} (406.4/sq mi)
- Time zone: UTC+01:00 (CET)
  - Summer (DST): UTC+02:00 (CEST)
- Postal codes: 63691
- Dialling codes: 06041
- Vehicle registration: FB, BÜD
- Website: www.ranstadt.de

Ranstadt (German pronunciation: [ˈʁanʃtat]) is a municipality in the Wetteraukreis, in Hesse, Germany. It is located approximately 35 kilometers northeast of Frankfurt am Main.

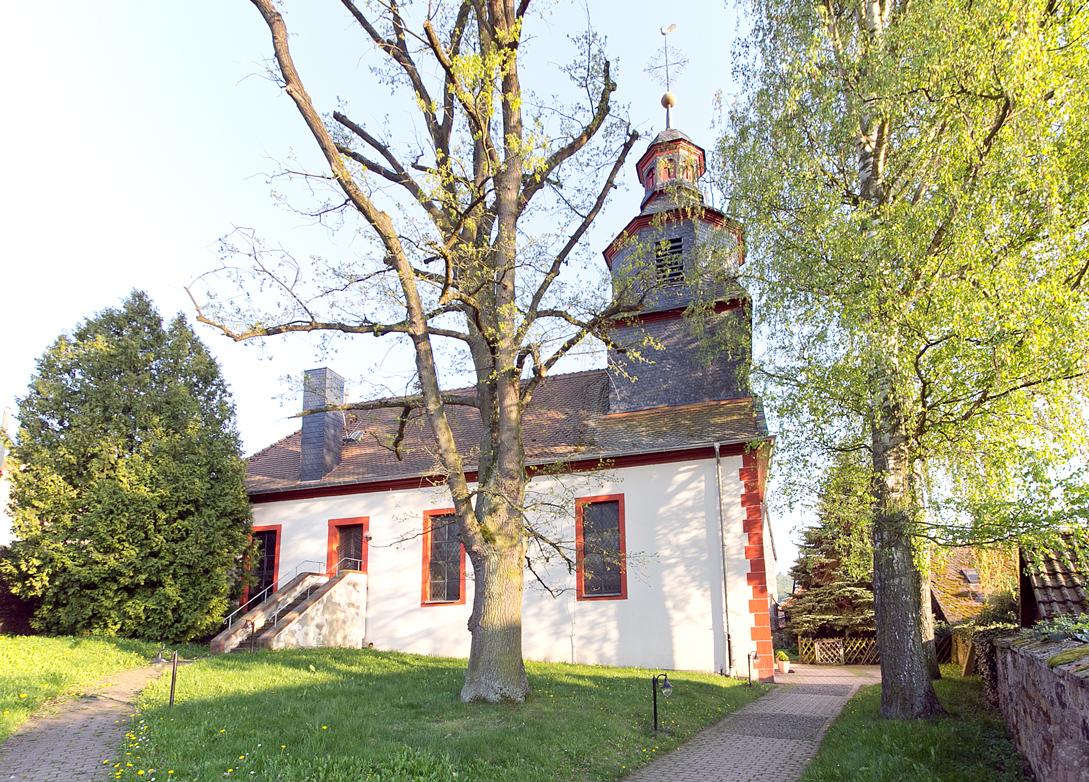
Church
