= Altenstadt, Hesse =

Altenstadt
- Municipality
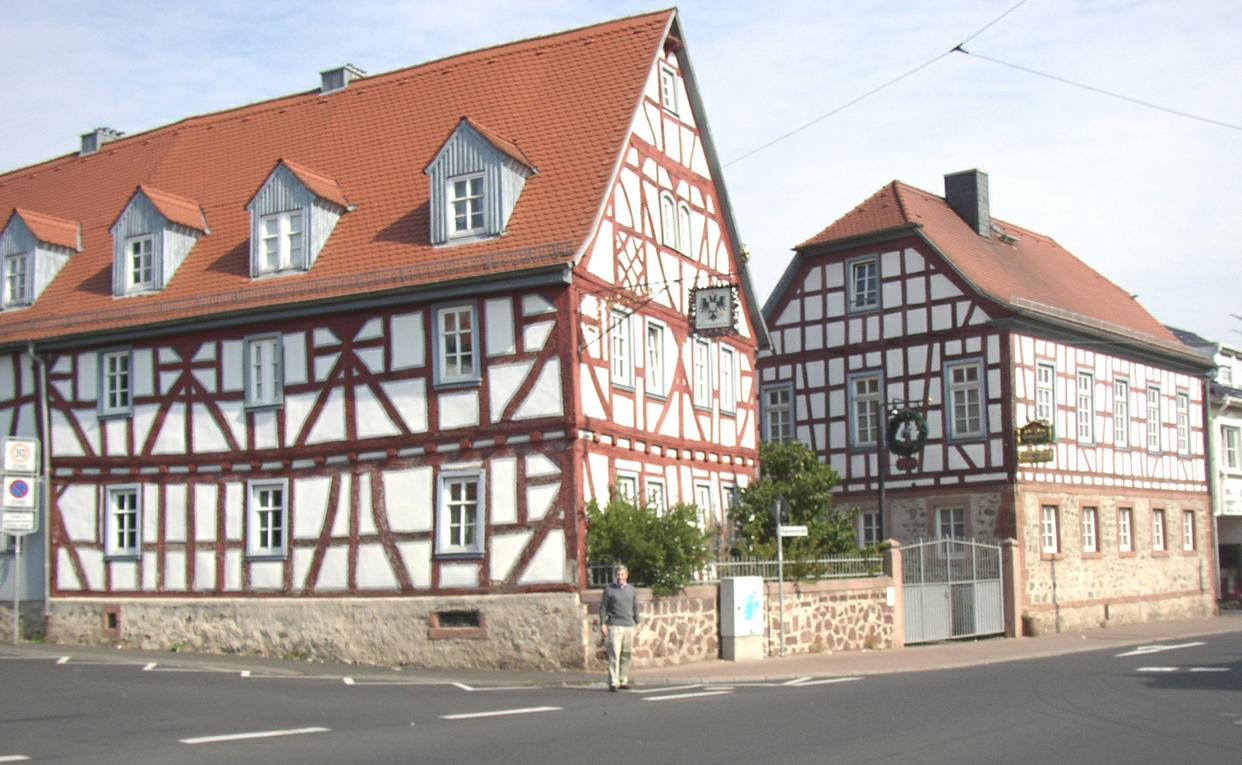
- Altenstadt, Schwarzer Adler Inn

- Coat of arms

- Location of Altenstadt within Wetteraukreis district
- Interactive map of Altenstadt
- Location within Germany Location within Hesse
- Coordinates: 50°17′08″N 8°56′42″E
- Country: Germany
- State: Hesse
- Admin. region: Darmstadt
- District: Wetteraukreis
- Subdivisions: 8 districts

Government
  - Mayor (2024–30): Dominic Imhof (Ind.)

Area
  - Total: 30.09 km^{2} (11.62 sq mi)
- Elevation: 120 m (390 ft)

Population (2025-12-31)
  - Total: 12,668
  - Density: 421.0/km^{2} (1,090/sq mi)
- Time zone: UTC+01:00 (CET)
  - Summer (DST): UTC+02:00 (CEST)
- Postal codes: 63674
- Dialling codes: 06047
- Vehicle registration: FB
- Website: www.altenstadt.de

Altenstadt (German pronunciation: [ˈaltn̩ʃtat]) is a municipality in the district Wetteraukreis, in Hesse, Germany. It is situated in the Nidder valley, approx. 27 kilometers north-east of Frankfurt am Main.

== Municipal structure ==
Since the local government reorganisation in Hesse 1972, the municipality has comprised the districts Altenstadt, Heegheim, Höchst an der Nidder, Lindheim, Enzheim, Oberau, Rodenbach and Waldsiedlung. The Engelthal Abbey is situated just outside town, and Oppelshausen, which consists of a few houses next to the Altenstadt golf course.

== History ==
Altenstadt was crossed by the limes, the former border fortification of the Roman Empire. According to excavations, Altenstadt was a Roman garrison in the first half of the second century (about 250 AD).

The first documented mention of the municipality Altenstadt took place in 767 AD, which makes Altenstadt the oldest municipality of Upper Hesse.

== Notable persons ==
Rudolf Ehrmann was born in Altenstadt in 1879. He became Professor at the Friedrich-Wilhelms-Universität Berlin for Inner Medicine and one of the most prominent German Physician of first half of the 20th century. He was a personal general practitioner to Albert Einstein who helped him to emigrate to the United States in 1939. In 1945 he became a US citizen.

One of the inhabitants of Altenstadt was the justice inspector Friedrich Kellner, who alternated his work-week between Laubach and Altenstadt during World War II. Kellner recorded the misdeeds of the Nazis in a ten-volume diary which was on display in 2005 at the George Bush Presidential Library. A Canadian documentary, My Opposition: the Diaries of Friedrich Kellner, was produced in 2006.

The Lutheran missionary Georg Heinrich Schwarz was born in Höchst an der Nidder in 1868. He laboured in the Cape Bedford Mission, North Queensland, Australia, for 55 years. The anniversary of his arrival is still celebrated there each year in September and known as Muni Day.

On 5 September 2019, Stefan Jagsch from the extreme-right NPD was elected the Mayor of the Waldsiedlung unopposed, which led to irritation in other parties at national level.
