= Sulzbach (Nidda) =

River in Hesse, Germany

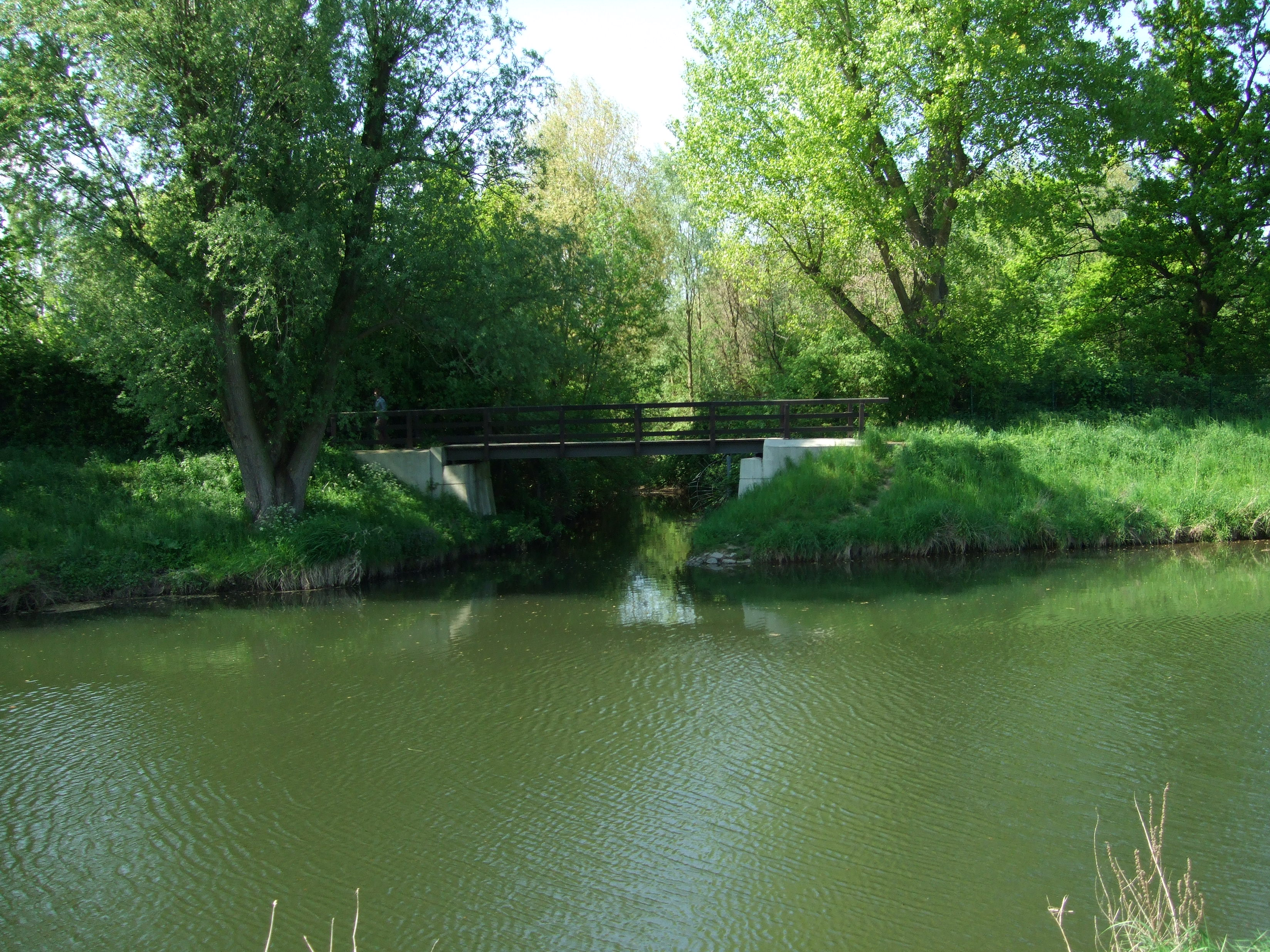

Location
- Country: Germany
- State: Hesse

Physical characteristics
- Mouth
  - location: Nidda
  - coordinates: 50.1087°N 8.5666°E
- Length: 12.3 km (7.6 mi)

Basin features
- Progression: Nidda→ Main→ Rhine→ North Sea

Sulzbach (German pronunciation: [ˈzʊltsbax]) is a river of Hesse, Germany. It is a right tributary of the Nidda, into which it flows in the western part of Frankfurt, close to its discharge into the Main. It flows through Bad Soden and Sulzbach.

== See also ==
- List of rivers of Hesse
