= Nidda (river) =

River in Germany

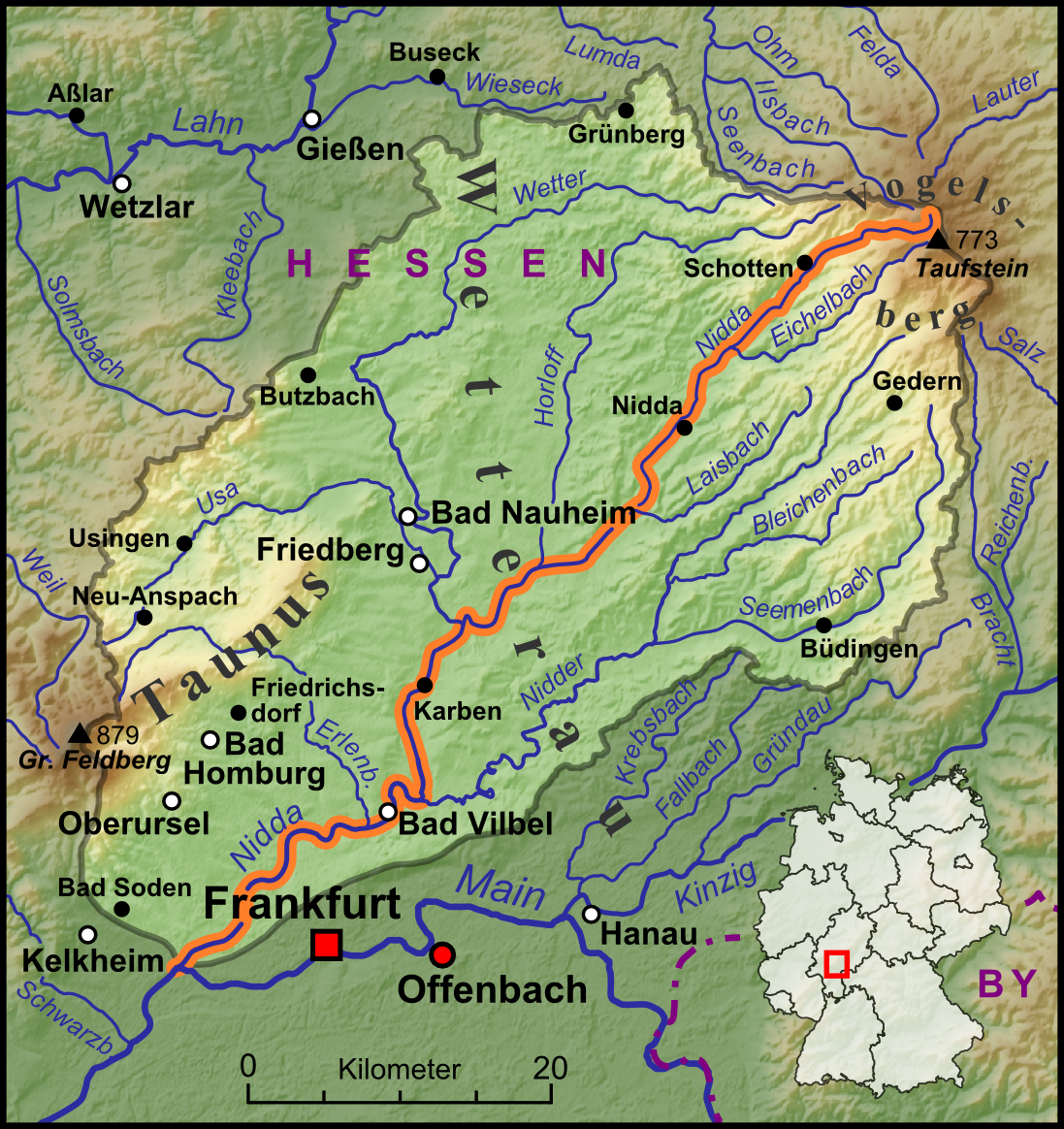
- Map of the Nidda river

Location
- Country: Germany
- State: Hesse

Physical characteristics
- Source
  - location: Vogelsberg
  - elevation: 720 m (2,360 ft)
- Mouth
  - location: Main
  - coordinates: 50°5′58″N 8°33′5″E
- Length: 90.0 km (55.9 mi)
- Basin size: 1,941 km^{2} (749 sq mi)

Basin features
- Progression: Main→ Rhine→ North Sea
- Tributaries
  - left: Nidder
  - right: Horloff, Wetter

The Nidda (German pronunciation: [ˈnɪda]) is a right-bank tributary of the river Main in Hesse, Germany.

It springs from the Vogelsberg on the Taufstein mountain range near the town of Schotten. It flows through the Niddastausee dam, and then through the towns of Nidda, Niddatal, Karben, and Bad Vilbel. At Harheim it reaches the Frankfurt am Main city area, and, after 90 km, flows into the Main in Höchst.

In the 1920s and 1960s, the flow of the Nidda was regulated to reduce the risk of floods. The original numerous meanders turned into bayous, while the riverbed was straightened and made deeper.

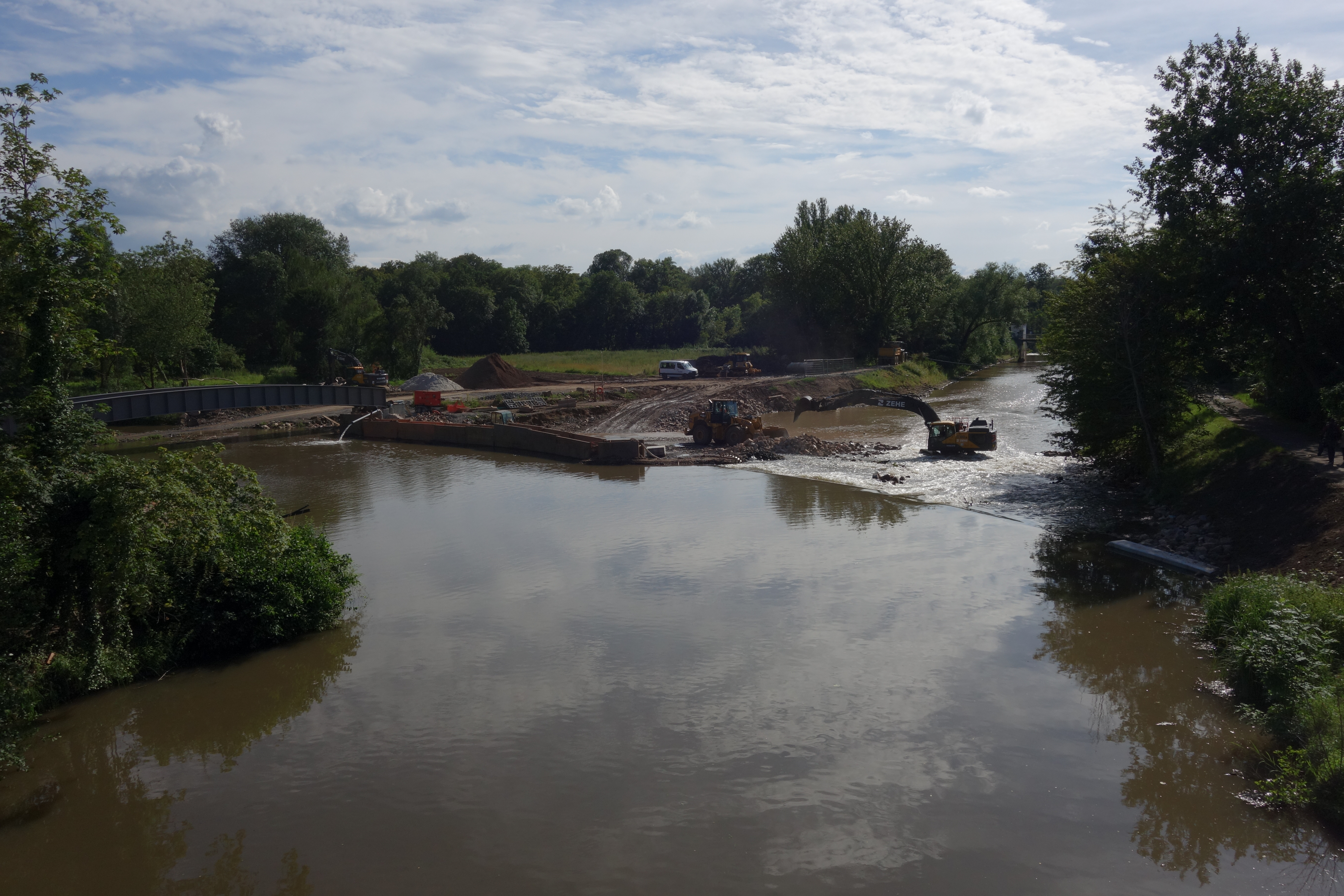
Renaturation works at Sossenheimer Wehr (Sossenheim weir, visible in the background), near highway intersection Westkreuz Frankfurt in 2024

Since 1993, the Nidda gets partially restored to its natural state, beginning in Frankfurt-Berkersheim. Also a bicycle path was built along the river. From 2012 to 2013 the old weir in Frankfurt-Höchst has been demolished and substituted by a so called "Streichwehr": A type of weir which allows fishes to move freely as well as it is also usable to avoid floods. Since 2023 the same process is in progress at the weir in Frankfurt-Sossenheim.

== Tributaries ==
The following rivers are tributaries to the river Nidda (from source to mouth):

- Left: Michelbach, Läunsbach, Eichelbach, Hohensteinerbach, Laisbach, Wehrbach, Selzenbach, Nidder, Edelbach
- Right: Graswiesenbach, Hohlbach, Gierbach, Ulfa, Salzbach, Hollergraben, Horloff, Wetter, Rosbach, Geringsgraben, Erlenbach, Eschbach, Kalbach, Urselbach, Steinbach, Westerbach and Sulzbach.
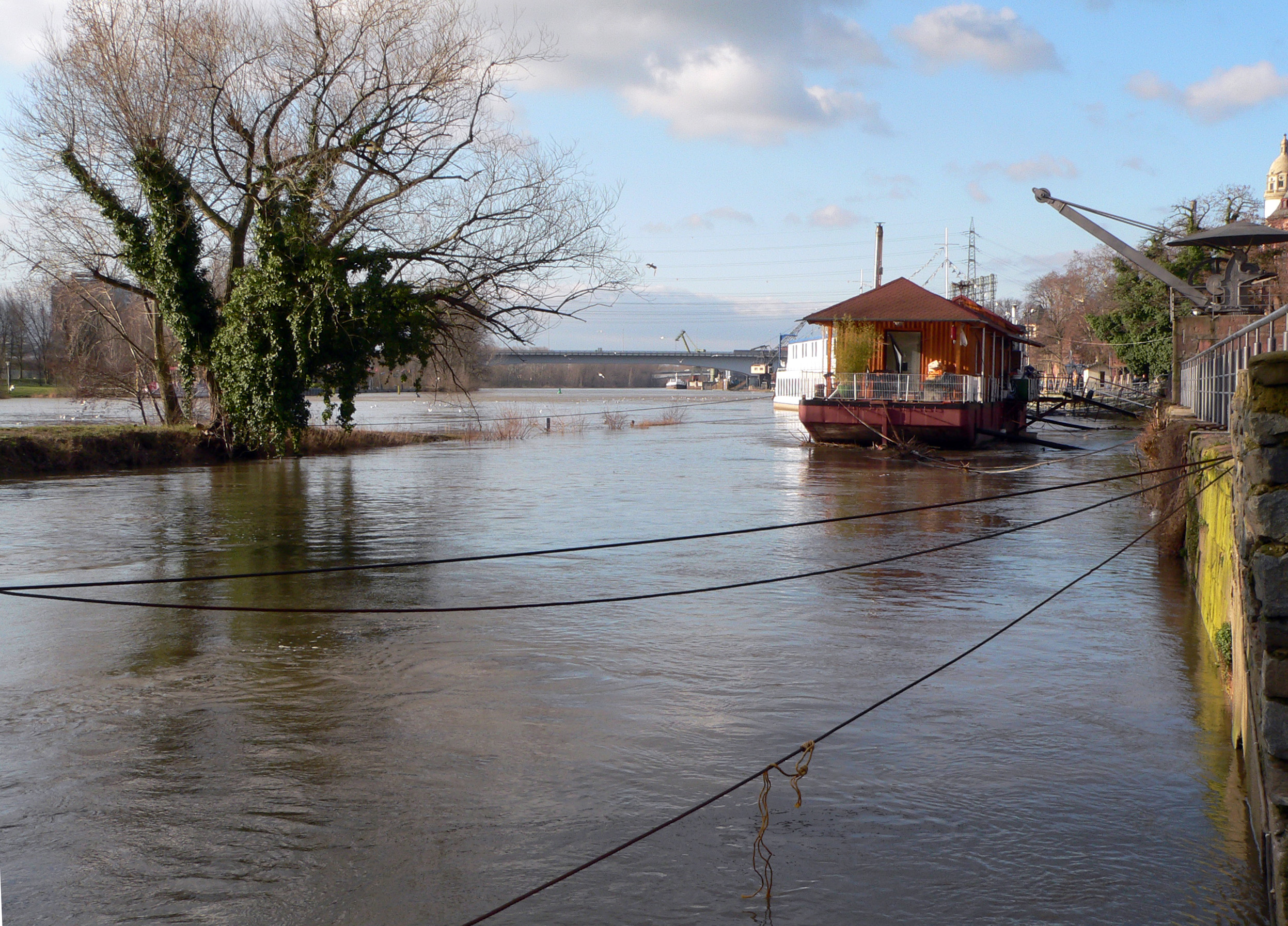
Nidda estuary „Wörthspitze“ with houseboats

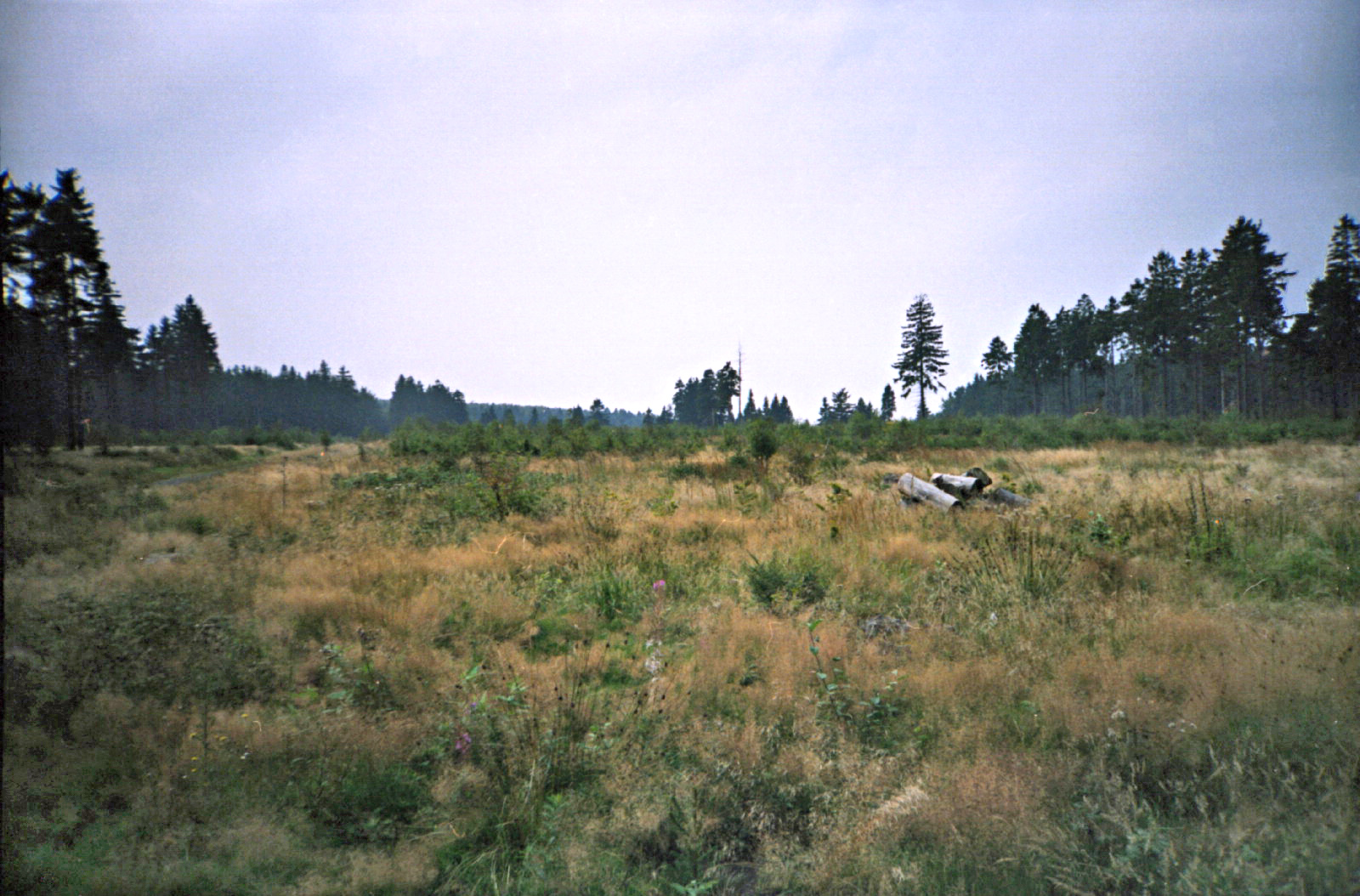
The area around the source of the Nidda

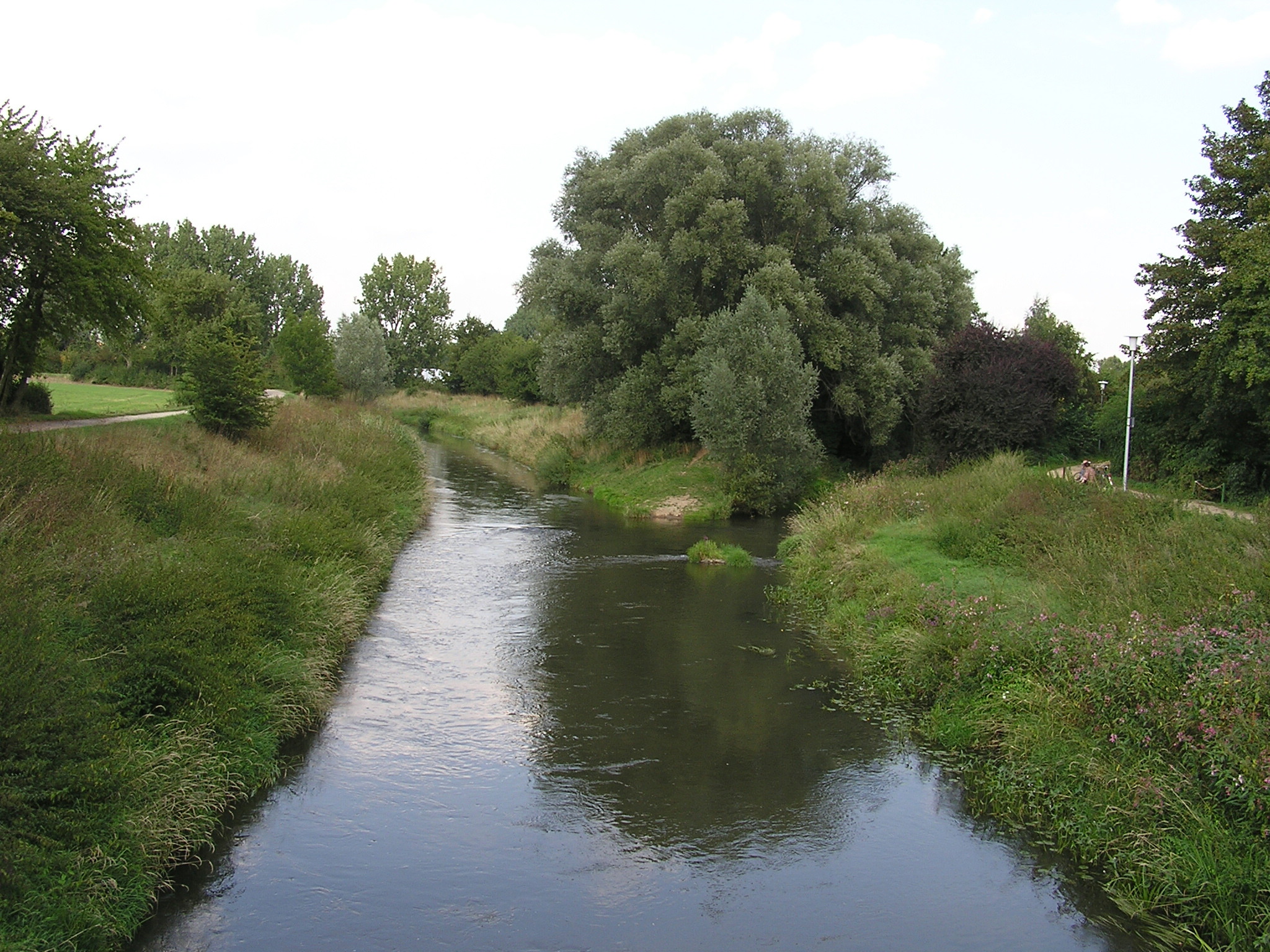
Mouth of the tributary Nidder
