= Steinkopf (Taunus) =

Mountain in Hesse, Germany

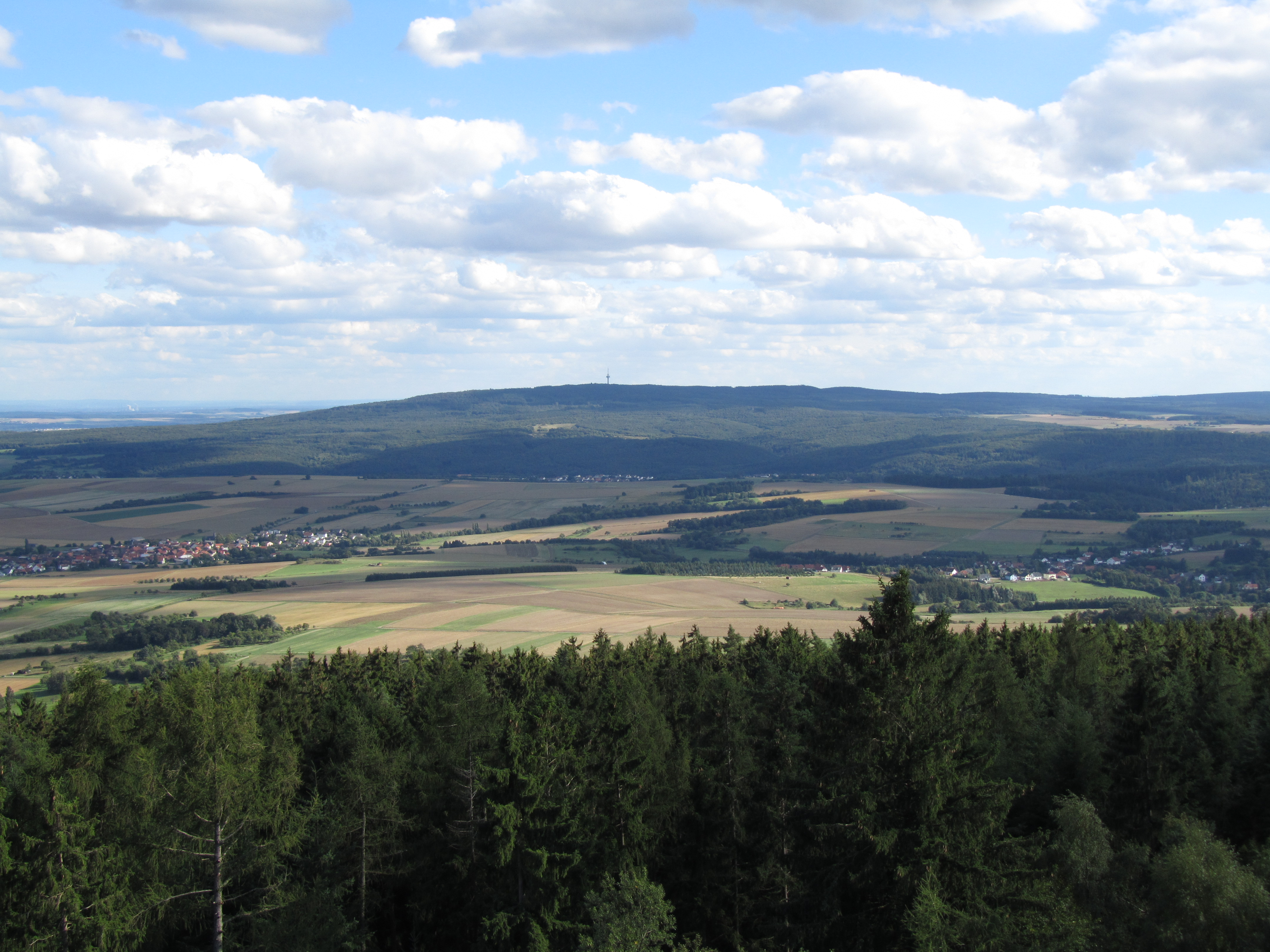
- View from the Hausberg Tower looking SSE to the Steinkopf about 10 km away

Highest point
- Elevation: 518 m above sea level (NHN) (1,699.5 ft)
- Prominence: 173 m ↓ Saddle at Hof Löwenheck in Wehrheim
- Isolation: 10.17 km → northeast slope of the Roßkopf
- Listing: – Telecommunication tower – Winterstein Tower (viewing tower)
- Coordinates: 50°19′37.5″N 8°39′38.2″E

Geography
- Location within Hesse
- Location: near Ober-Rosbach, Pfaffenwiesbach; Wetteraukreis, Hochtaunuskreis; Hesse (Germany)
- Parent range: Taunus

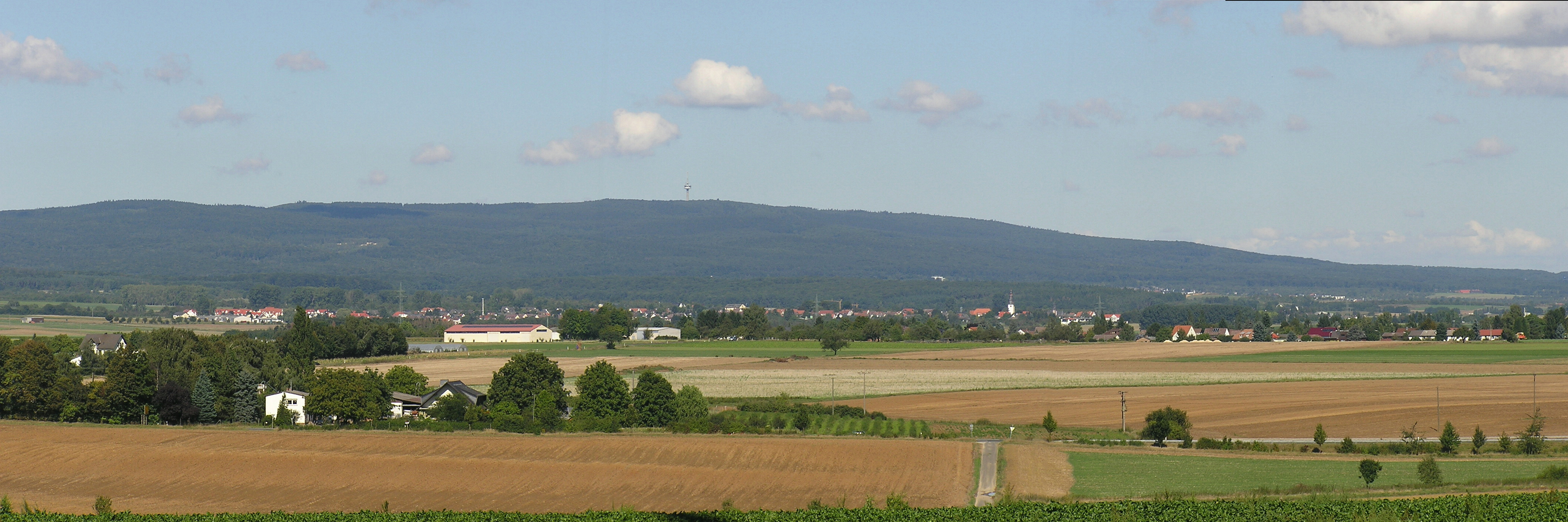
View from Karben northwest to Steinkopf with Typenturm radio tower and the hill spur of Winterstein to the right

The Steinkopf near Ober-Rosbach in the county of Wetteraukreis and Pfaffenwiesbach in the county of Hochtaunuskreis in the German state of Hesse is a hill, 518 m above sea level (NHN), in the eastern Taunus and the easternmost Taunus eminence over 300 m. It has an isolation of 10.170 km and a prominence of 173 m and is thus one of the five independent summits in the Taunus. The Steinkopf is a landmark visible from a long distance especially for the immediately adjacent region of Wetterau to the east.

== Geography ==
=== Location ===
The Steinkopf rises in the Taunus Nature Park between Ober-Rosbach, which belongs to Rosbach vor der Höhe in the Wetteraukreis, and the village of Pfaffenwiesbach, which is part of Wehrheim in the Hochtaunuskreis; the border between the two counties runs around 200 m northwest of the summit of the wooded Steinkopf. The summit is located in Wetterau, 3.3 km northwest of Ober-Rosbach, 4.2 km west of Ockstadt in the borough of Friedberg, on whose boundary it lies, and 3.7 km east of Pfaffenwiesbach.

About 850 m north-northeast of the summit is the hill spur of Winterstein (482.3 m) and 400 m south of the summit is the Dachskopf (512.6 m). In front of the latter are the Mainzer Kopf (420.9 m) in the south-east and the Kuhkopf (approx. 500 m) in the south-west about 1 km away. They are all part of the Steinkopf massif.

The stream of Holzbach rises on the western flanks of the Steinkopf and the Seebach on its northeast hillside, both flowing into the Usa. In addition, the Wetter tributary, the Straßbach, rises on the eastern flank of the Steinkopf and the Rosbach tributary, the Fahrenbach, on the south-southeast flank of the Dachskopf.

A section of the A 5 autobahn runs past the lower slopes of the Steinkopf on the eastern side, between the services at Rasthof Wetterau and the junction of Friedberg. The Steinkopf is a striking landmark when seen from the intersection of Gambacher Kreuz, especially for traffic coming from the north.

=== Impact crater ===
According to investigations by a team from the University of Marburg, a meteorite may have fallen between the Steinkopf and the Salzberg (341.1 m), 2.7 km to the south-southeast near Ober-Rosbach, which could have formed the valley of the Fahrenbach, which resembles an impact crater. A precise geological investigation of rock samples could not find any indications of impact metamorphism, only quartzite with the usual deformations caused by orogeny.

== Usage ==
=== Limes with forts ===
The Upper Germanic-Rhaetian Limes runs along the western flanks of the Steinkopf and has three forts (Kleinkastell), one at Kaisergrube in the northwest and two near the Kuhkopf.

=== Telecommunication tower ===
On the summit region of the Steinkopf is a 105.35-metre-high high telecommunication tower (Typenturm), which may be seen in good weather from Frankfurt over the Wetterau to the Vogelsberg. The tower, which went into operation in 1972, was originally also used as a TV transmitter, but today it only serves as a directional and mobile radio system.

=== Military use ===
Since 1949 an area on the southwest flank has been used as an ammunition depot, initially by the United States Armed Forces, and since 1997 by the Bundeswehr. An area of 3200 ha on the north side was designated as a military training area, but only 70 hectares were used. In the meantime, 59.44 ha of these are located on the Eichkopf north-east of the Winterstein as Special Area of Conservation.(FFH no. 5617-302) At the subsequent northern edge of the base were the transmission bunkers of the FHQ Adlerhorst, to the northeast and southeast of the base two US Army depots.

=== Quarry ===
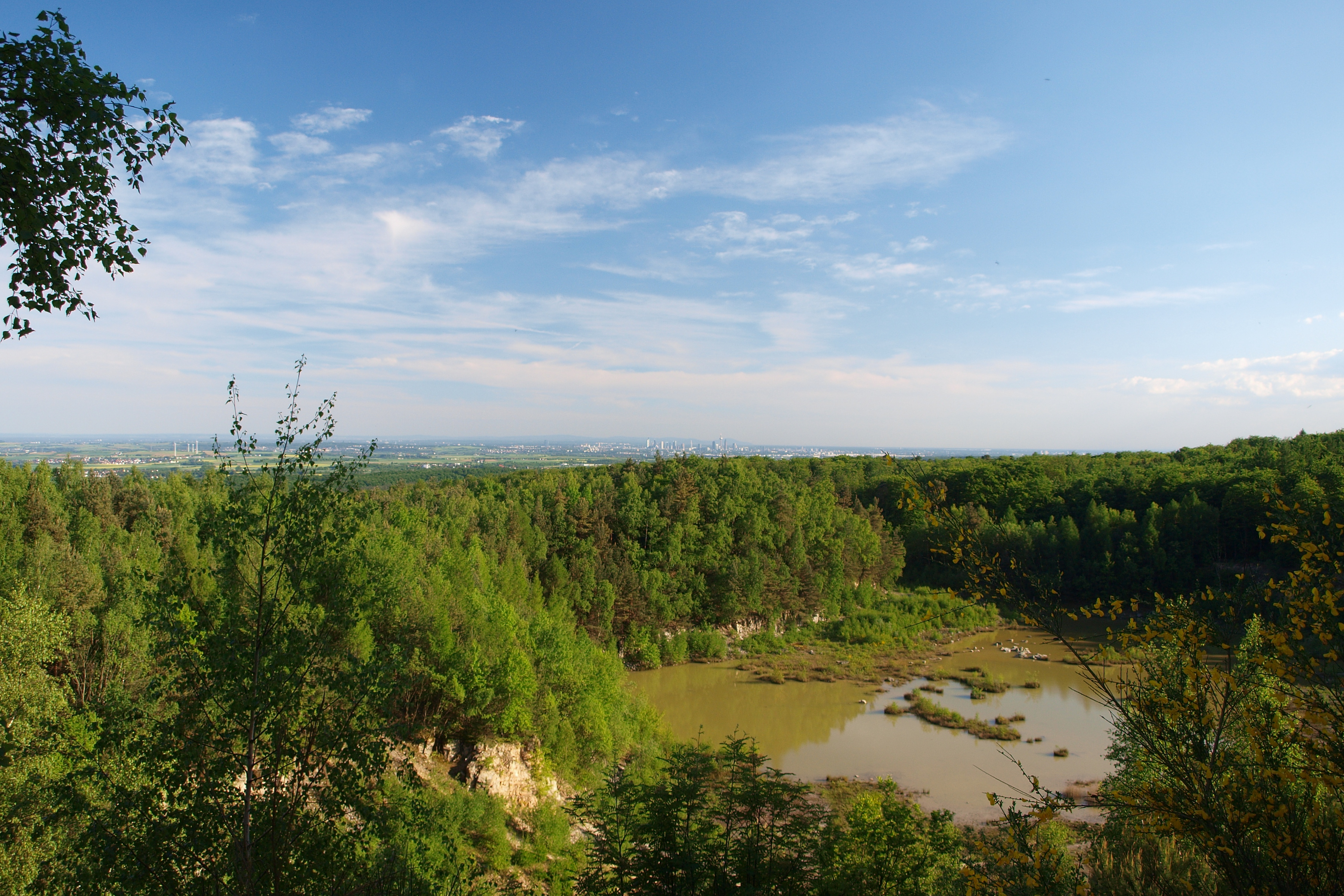
View from the vantage point over the former quartzite quarry at Saukopf

On the south-eastern slopes of the Saukopf, southwest of the Steinkopf and also near Ober-Rosbach there was a quartzite-quarry, parts of which have become a nature reserve since 2010 called the Quarzitbruch bei Rosbach (CDDA-No. 555514019; 5.14 hectares).

=== Mining ===
Beginning in Roman times and intensified in the 19th century, mining was carried out on lead and silver.

== Winterstein ==
=== Location ===
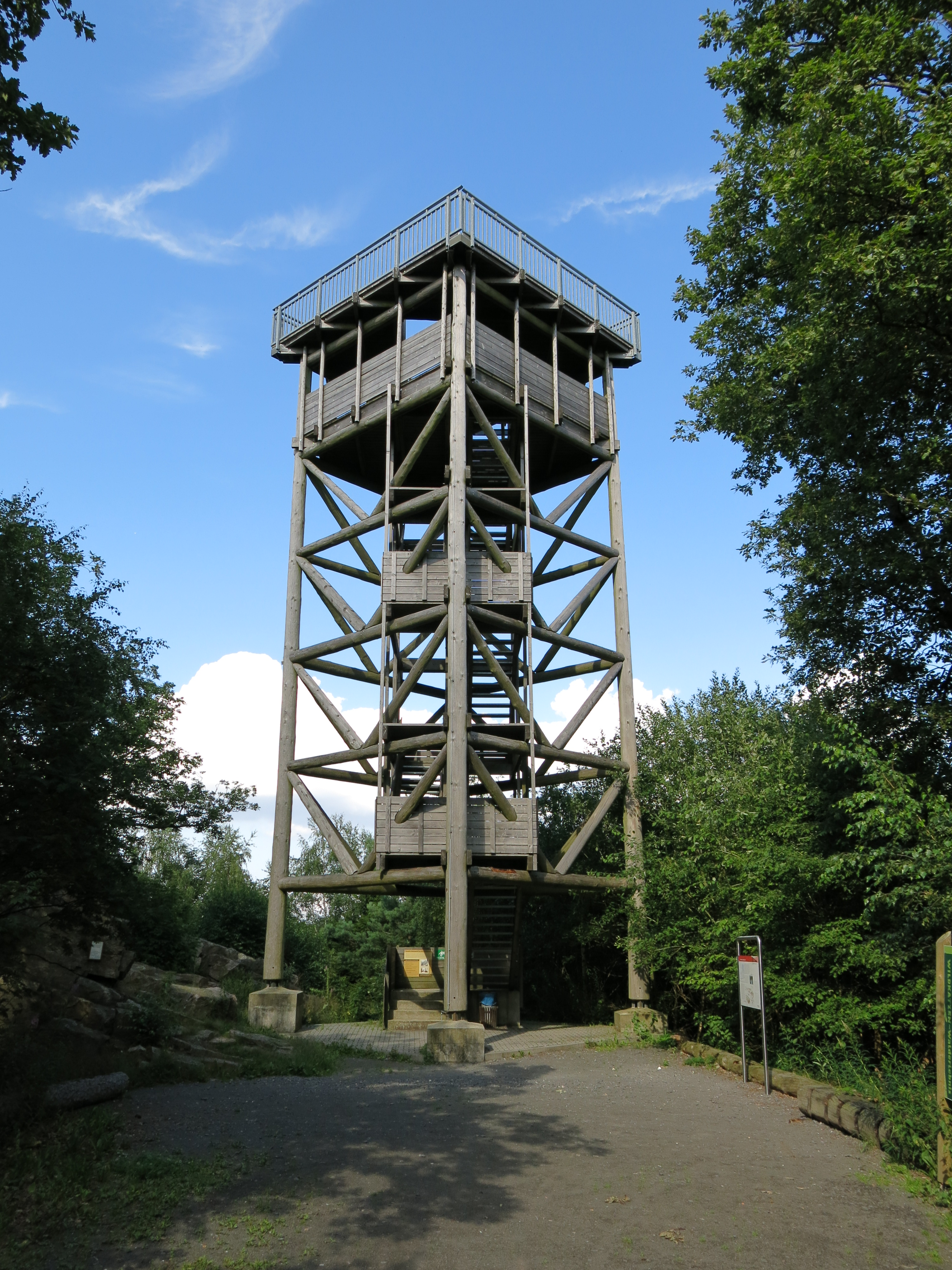
The Winterstein Tower

The Winterstein (50°20′1.2″N 8°40′2.1″E, 482.3 m) is a hill spur about 850 m north-northeast of the Steinkopf summit, which does not stand out from the Steinkopf when seen from the low-lying Wetterau. It is located 3.8 km west of Ockstadt in the municipality of Ober-Mörlen. In the surrounding area, the entire Steinkopf massif is often referred to as the Winterstein. Only this spur is shown on many maps, although it is lower than the Steinkopf summit.

=== Winterstein Tower ===
As early as 1888, the Taunus Club in Wetterau built a small wooden observation tower on the Winterstein. In 2004 this was demolished due to its dilapidation. Through a citizens' initiative, people in Ober-Mörlen, Bad Nauheim and Friedberg succeeded, with the help of donations from companies, institutions, etc., in erecting a new, higher, five-story wooden tower (17.65 m) with two viewing platforms built entirely from Douglas Fir wood and called Winterstein. The topping-out ceremony took place on 1 May 2005 and the tower was inaugurated on 3 July 2005.

Its lower viewing platform is 13.9 metres high and can be reached via 4 concrete and 71 metal steps. The upper one is 16.73 metres high is another 14 metal steps higher. The square upper platform has a side length of 6.7 m and is surrounded by a 1.15-metre-high metal parapet. From there, at a height of 498.41 m the view extends to the Westerwald to the northwest, to the Gladenbach Uplands to the north, to the Wetterau to the east and, beyond that, to the Vogelsberg, to the Spessart to the southeast and to Frankfurt to the south and, beyond it, to the Odenwald. In very good visibility there are views to the north of the Rothaar Mountains, to the north-northeast of the Kellerwald, to the northeast of the Knüll mountains, to the east of the Rhön mountains and to the south, 150 km away, the Black Forest.

== Tourism ==
On the northern flank of Steinkopf and Winterstein is the Winterstein hikers' car park (335 m), which can be accessed from Wintersteinstraße and is signposted from the commercial district of Ober-Mörlen. To the west the E3 European long distance path runs past the Steinkopf, crossing the limes. Starting in Pfaffenwiesbach to the west, it runs through the valley of the Wiesbach to the Limes at Kapersburg and continues through the forest to the Kuhkopf (approx. 500 m) and Dachskopf (512.6 m). The summit is easily accessible on this route.

The 7 km long adventure trail Wildcat Experience (Wildkatzen-Walderlebnis) runs over the Winterstein. This circular route set up by the BUND begins and ends at the hiking car park of Winterstein. It leads past the Winterstein observation tower. On this trail, which runs along narrow paths in many places, about 190 vertical metres have to be climbed.
