= Fauerbach =

Fauerbach may refer to:

- Fauerbach (Usa), a river of Hesse, Germany, tributary of the Usa
- Fauerbach, a district of Friedberg, Hesse, Germany
- Fauerbach, a district of Nidda, Hesse, Germany
- Fauerbach vor der Höhe, a district of Butzbach, Hesse, Germany
