= Vogelthal-Bach =

River in Germany

Location
- Country: Germany
- State: Hesse

Physical characteristics
- Mouth
  - location: Usa
  - coordinates: 50.3629°N 8.6396°E

Basin features
- Progression: Usa→ Wetter→ Nidda→ Main→ Rhine→ North Sea

Vogelthal-Bach is a small river of Hesse, Germany. It flows into the Usa near Ober-Mörlen.

== See also ==
- List of rivers of Hesse
