= Forbach (Usa) =

River of Hesse, Germany

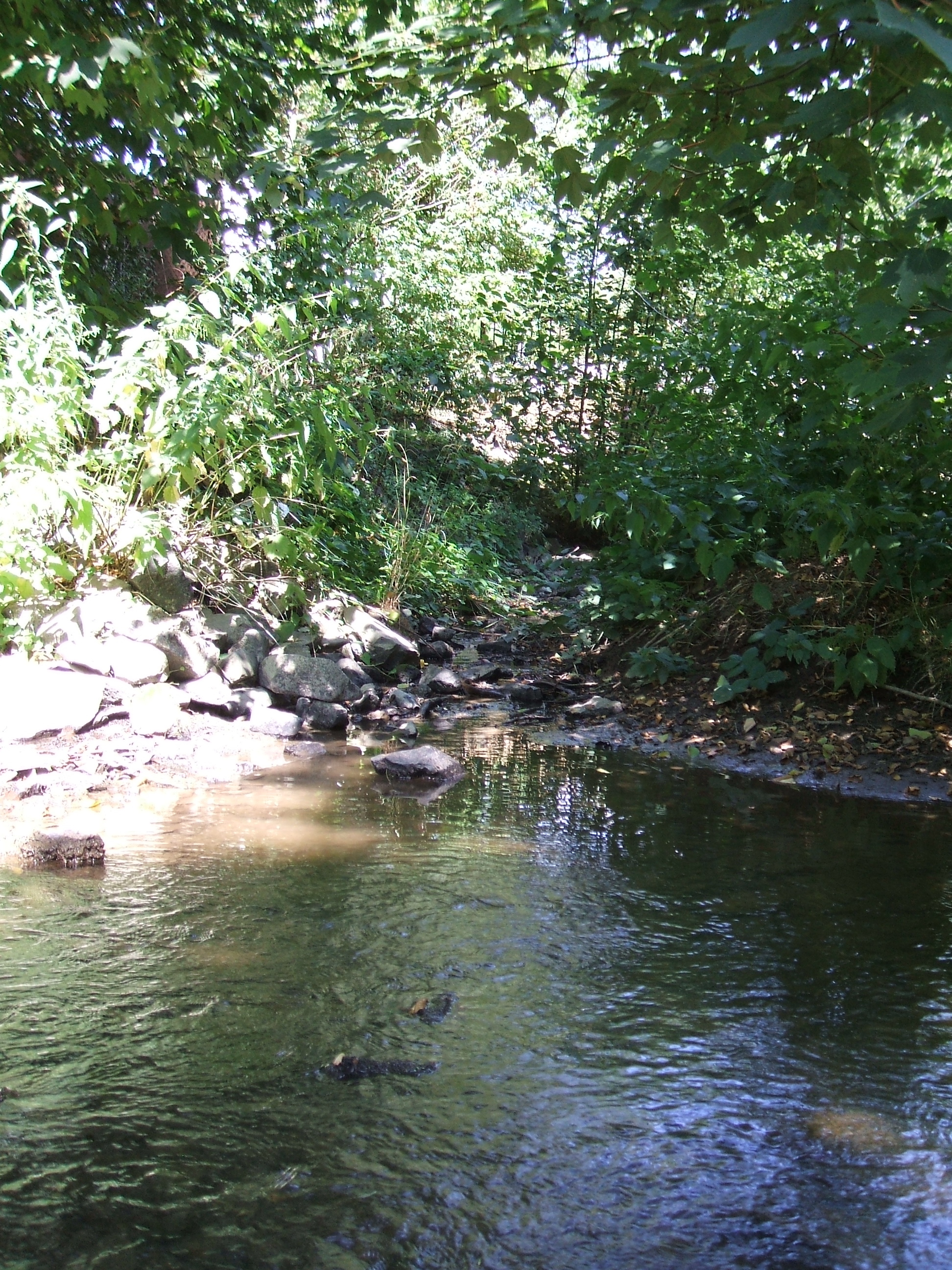

Location
- Country: Germany
- State: Hesse

Physical characteristics
- Mouth
  - location: Usa
  - coordinates: 50°21′57″N 8°37′36″E

Basin features
- Progression: Usa→ Wetter→ Nidda→ Main→ Rhine→ North Sea

Forbach is a small river of Hesse, Germany. It flows into the Usa near Ober-Mörlen.

== See also ==
- List of rivers of Hesse
