= Aitzenbach =

River in Germany

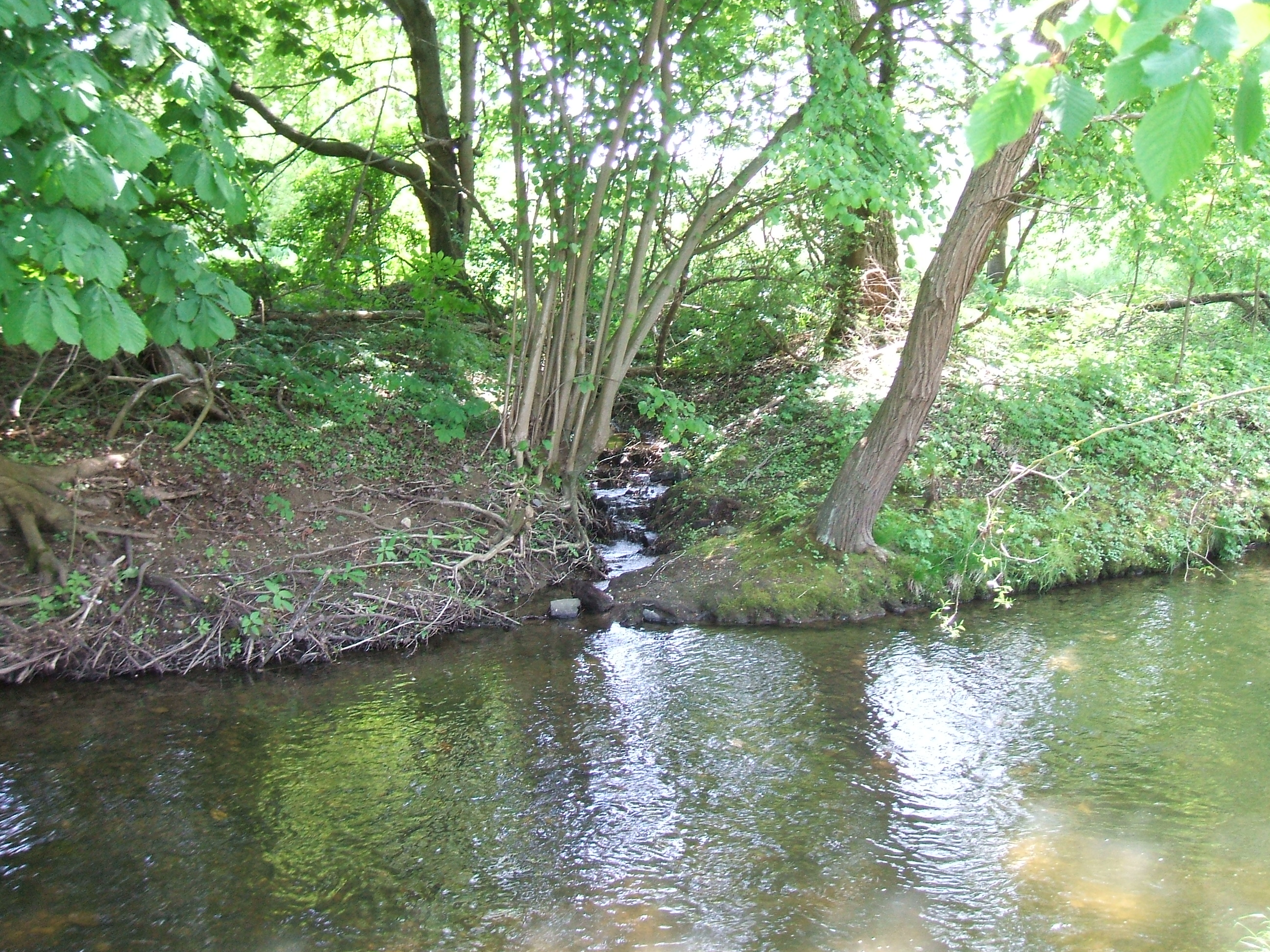

- Location of mouth

Location
- Country: Germany
- State: Hesse

Physical characteristics
- Mouth
  - location: Usa
  - coordinates: 50.3662°N 8.6706°E

Basin features
- Progression: Usa→ Wetter→ Nidda→ Main→ Rhine→ North Sea

Aitzenbach (German pronunciation: [ˈaɪtsn̩bax]) is a small river of Hesse, Germany. It is a right and southern tributary of the Usa, joining it near Ober-Mörlen.

== See also ==
- List of rivers of Hesse
