= Kittelbach =

Kittelbach may refer to:

- Kittelbach (Düssel), a river of North Rhine-Westphalia, Germany, tributary of the Düssel
- Kittelbach (Röllbach) a river of Hesse, Germany, tributary of the Röllbach
