= Pilot und Flugzeug =

- Frequency: Monthly
- Publisher: Pilot und Flugzeug Verlags GmbH
- Founded: 1980; 45 years ago
- Country: Germany
- Based in: Friedberg
- Language: German
- Website: Pilot und Flugzeug
- ISSN: 0175-0143

Pilot und Flugzeug (meaning Pilot and Aircraft in English) is a German language general aviation magazine published monthly in Germany.

== History ==
Pilot und Flugzeug was founded by Heiko Teegen in 1980. The magazine is published by Pilot und Flugzeug Verlags GmbH on a monthly basis.

The magazine quickly became known for very critical journalism. After the sudden and unexpected death of Heiko Teegen in the summer 2003, Jan Brill took over as editor in chief. Every year the readers are invited to join a fly out, a short, usually European-wide flight route. Also, ever other year, Pilot und Flugzeug undertakes longer transcontinental "reader journeys", which enable general aviation pilots to take longer trips in groups. These journeys are prepared and supported by the staff of the magazine. The reader journeys have gone around the world (2013) been to South America twice and go to North America regularly to Oshkosh for the annual airshow EAA AirVenture Oshkosh.
