= Stockheimer Bach =

River in Germany

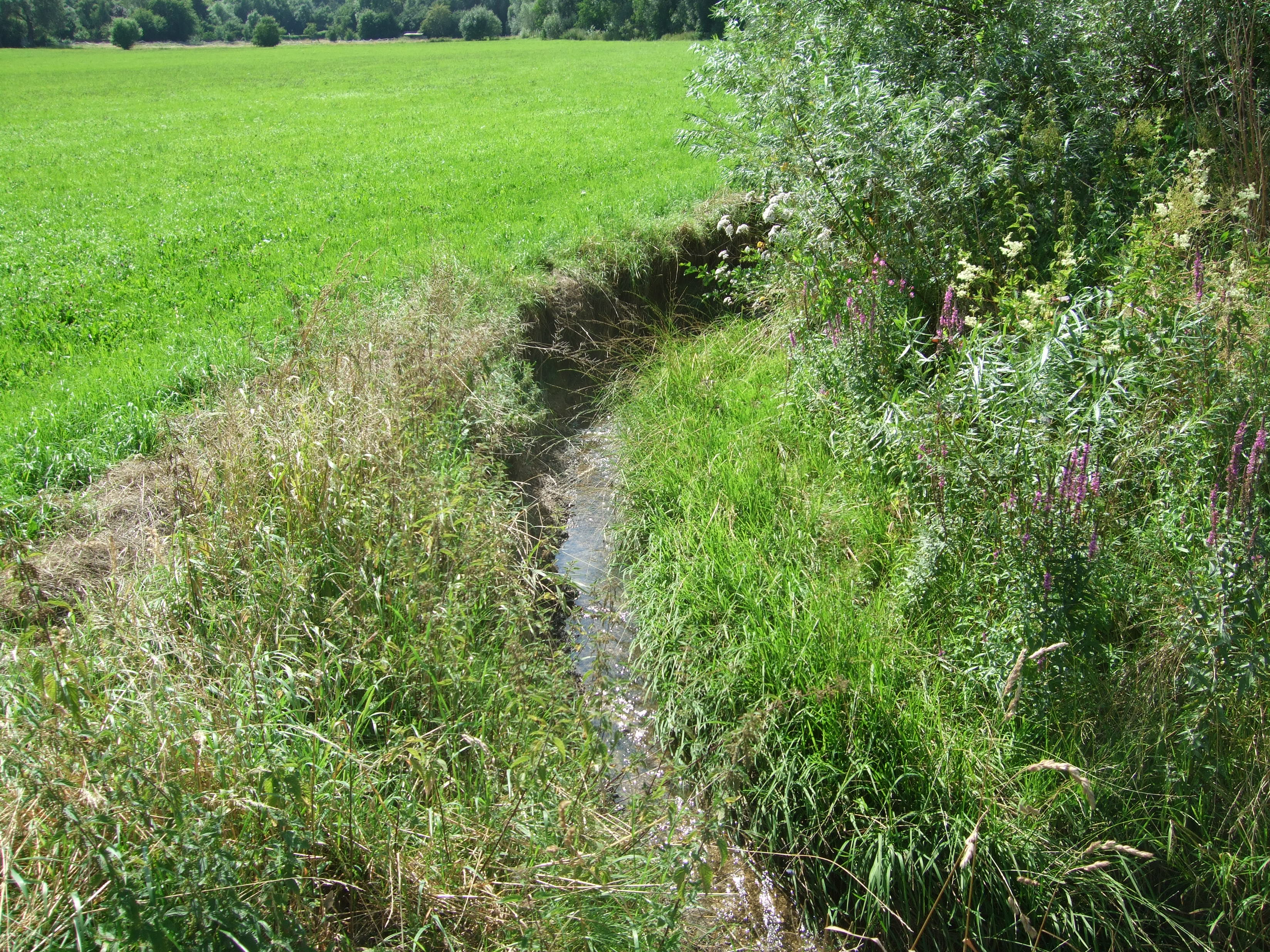

Location
- Country: Germany
- State: Hesse

Physical characteristics
- Mouth
  - location: Usa
  - coordinates: 50°19′57″N 8°33′07″E

Basin features
- Progression: Usa→ Wetter→ Nidda→ Main→ Rhine→ North Sea

Stockheimer Bach is a small river of Hesse, Germany. It flows into the Usa near Usingen.

== See also ==
- List of rivers of Hesse
