= Deutergraben =

River in Germany

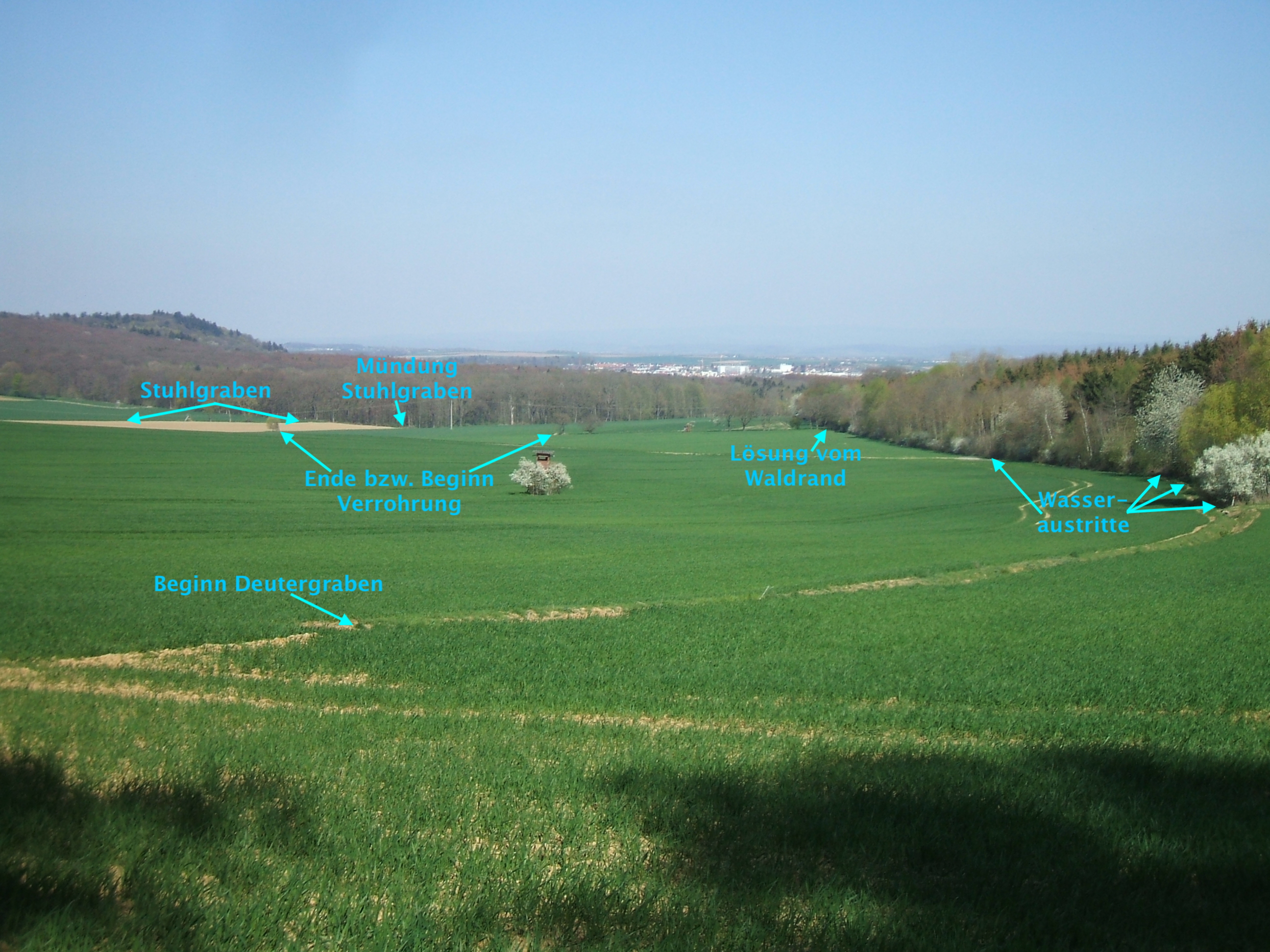

Location
- Country: Germany
- State: Hesse

Physical characteristics
- Mouth
  - location: Usa
  - coordinates: 50°21′20″N 8°44′54″E

Basin features
- Progression: Usa→ Wetter→ Nidda→ Main→ Rhine→ North Sea

The Deutergraben is a 4¼ km long river located near Hesse, Germany. It is a tributary of the Usa river. The confluence occurs in Bad Nauheim.

== See also ==
- List of rivers of Hesse
