= Dittenbach =

River in Germany

Location
- Country: Germany
- Location: Hesse

Physical characteristics
- Mouth
  - location: Usa
  - coordinates: 50.3487°N 8.5706°E

Basin features
- Progression: Usa→ Wetter→ Nidda→ Main→ Rhine→ North Sea

Dittenbach is a small river of Hesse, Germany. It flows into the Usa near Wernborn.

== See also ==
- List of rivers of Hesse
