= Michelbach (Usa) =

River in Hesse, Germany

- An old boundary stone in the Michelbach

Location
- Country: Germany
- State: Hesse

Physical characteristics
- Mouth
  - location: Usa
  - coordinates: 50.3560°N 8.5796°E
- Length: 8.1 km (5.0 mi)

Basin features
- Progression: Usa→ Wetter→ Nidda→ Main→ Rhine→ North Sea

Michelbach is a river of Hesse, Germany. It is a left tributary of the Usa in Wernborn (part of Usingen).

== See also ==
- List of rivers of Hesse
