= Eschbach (Usa) =

River in Hesse, Germany

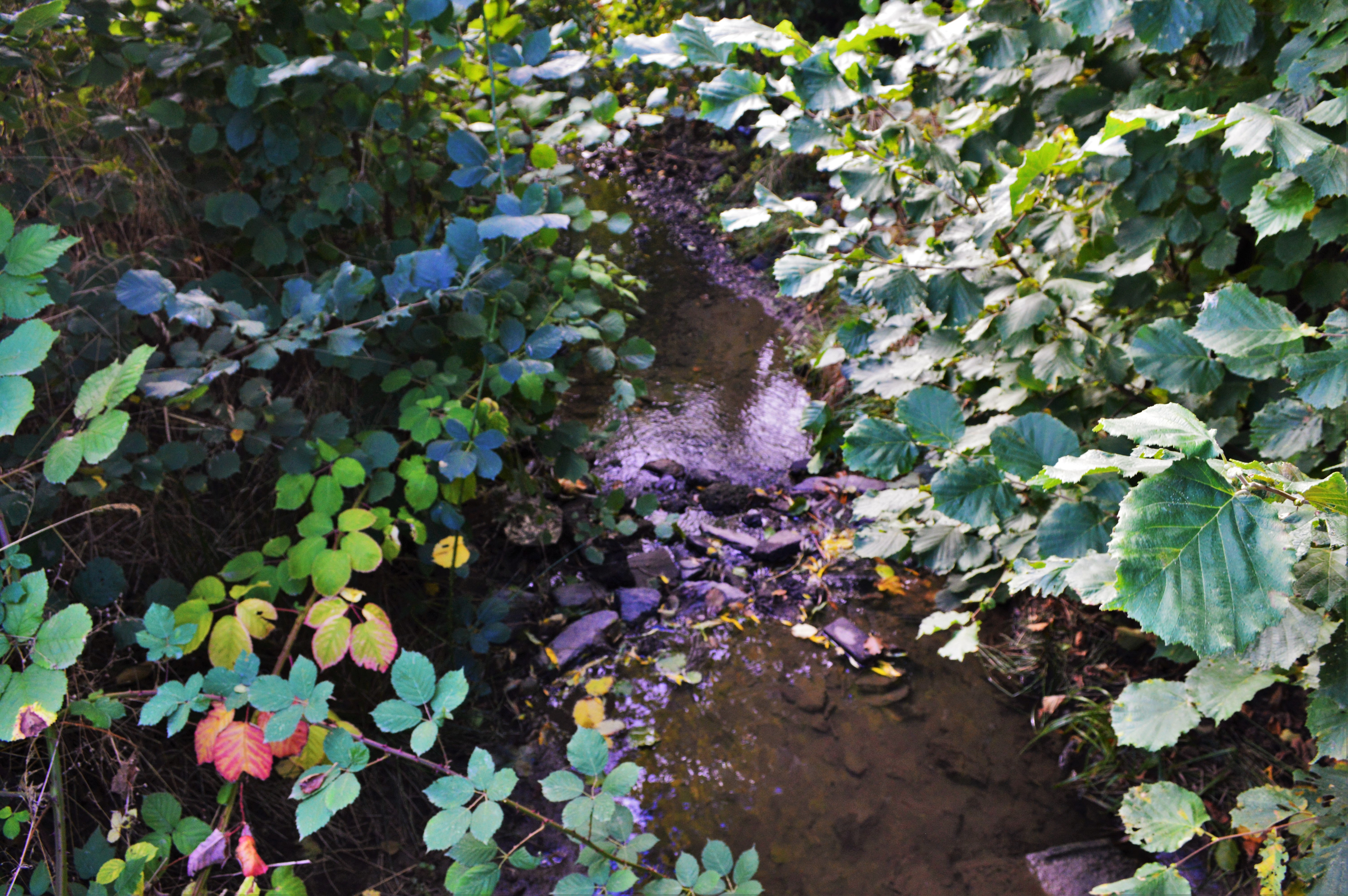
- The Eschbach

Location
- Country: Germany
- State: Hesse

Physical characteristics
- Mouth
  - location: Usa
  - coordinates: 50.3421°N 8.5634°E

Basin features
- Progression: Usa→ Wetter→ Nidda→ Main→ Rhine→ North Sea

Eschbach (German pronunciation: [ˈɛʃbax]) is a small river of Hesse, Germany. It is a left tributary of the Usa near Usingen.

== See also ==
- List of rivers of Hesse
