= Seebach (Usa) =

River in Germany

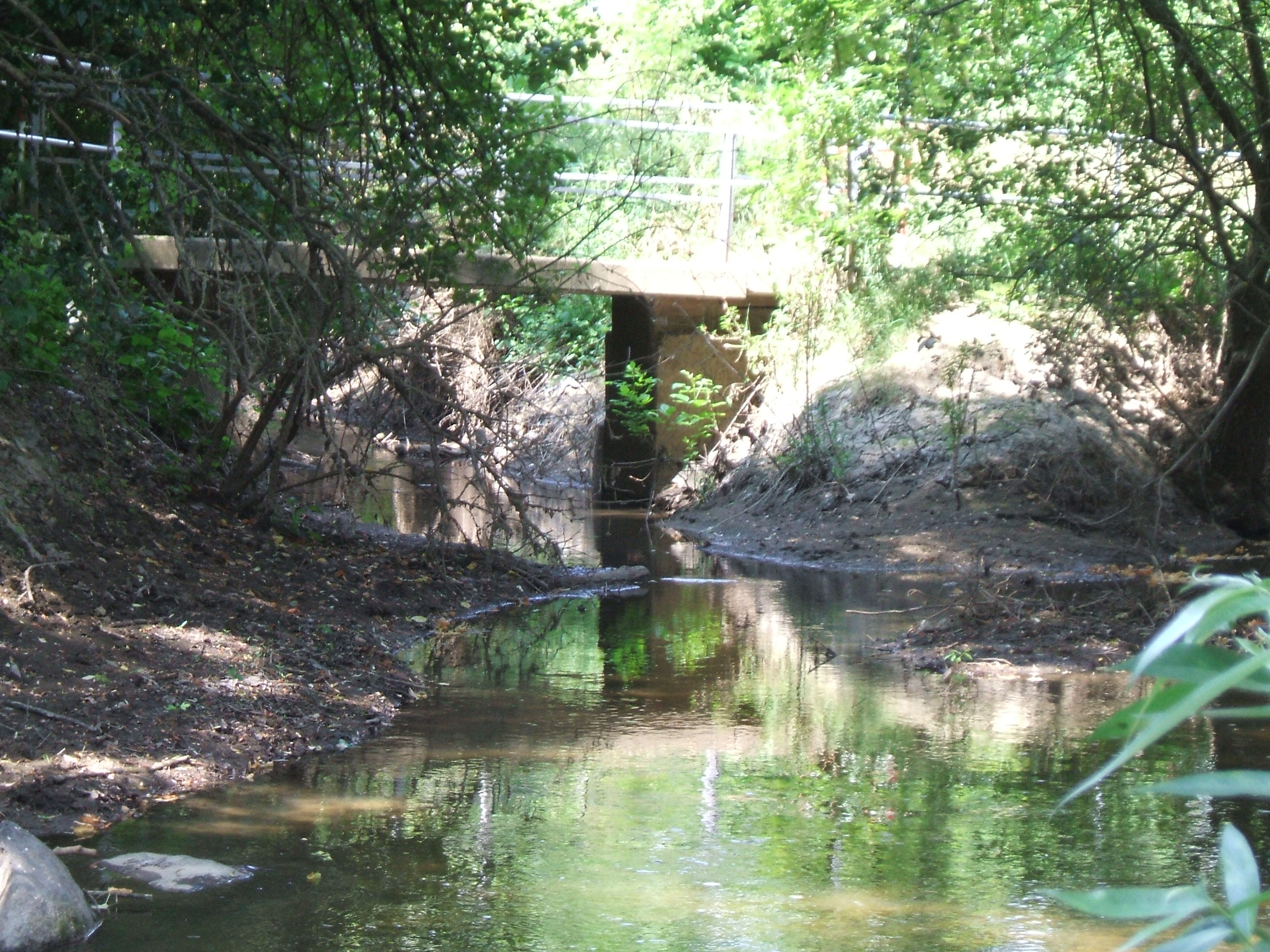

Location
- Country: Germany
- State: Hesse

Physical characteristics
- Mouth
  - location: Usa
  - coordinates: 50.3438°N 8.7559°E
- Length: 6.7 km (4.2 mi)

Basin features
- Progression: Usa→ Wetter→ Nidda→ Main→ Rhine→ North Sea

Seebach (German pronunciation: [ˈzeːbax]) is a river of Hesse, Germany. It flows into the Usa near Friedberg.

== See also ==
- List of rivers of Hesse
