= Arnsbach (Usa) =

River in Germany

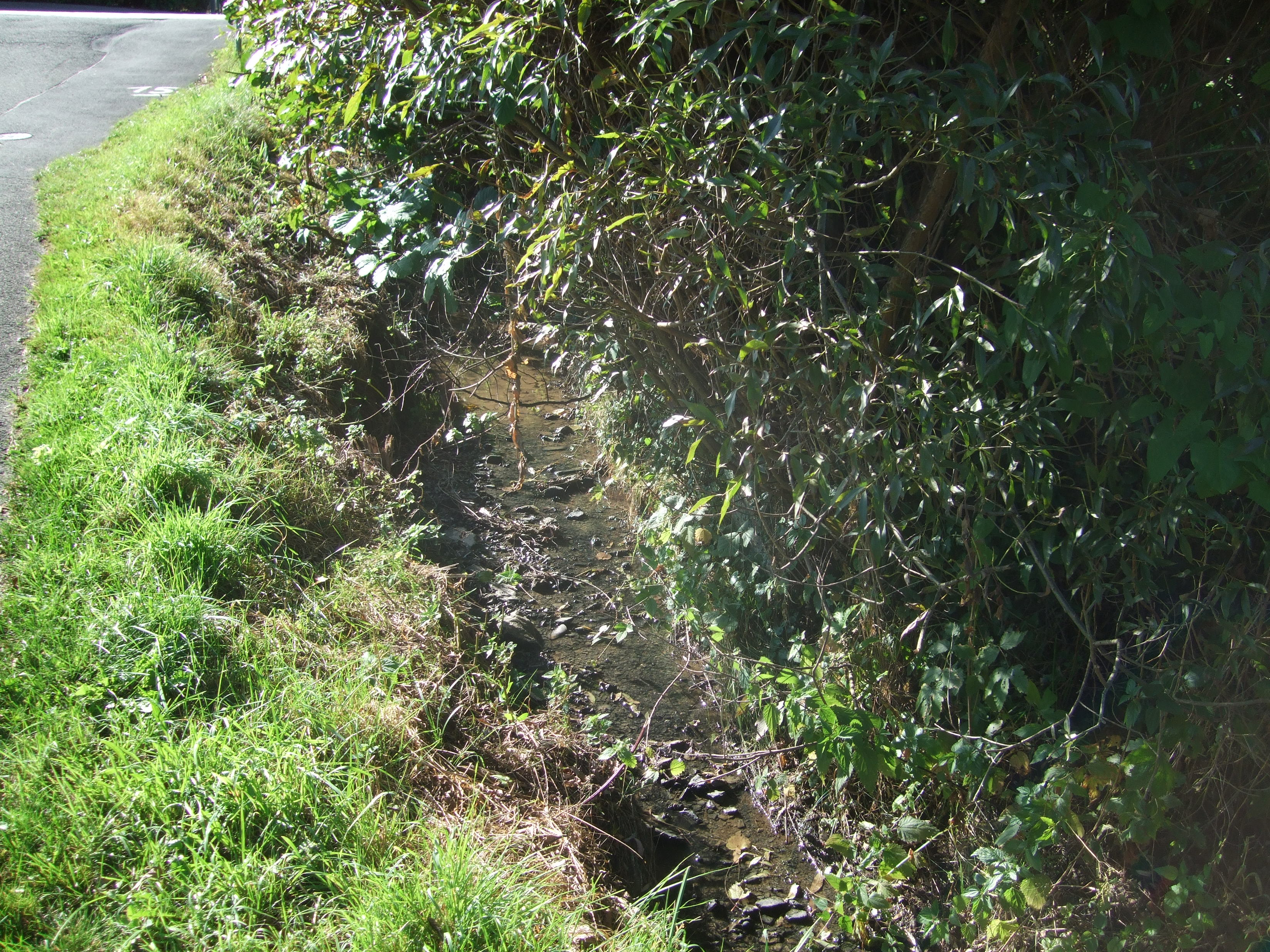

- Location of mouth in Hesse

Location
- Country: Germany
- State: Hesse

Physical characteristics
- Mouth
  - location: Usa
  - coordinates: 50°18′58″N 08°31′22″E

Basin features
- Progression: Usa→ Wetter→ Nidda→ Main→ Rhine→ North Sea
- Tributaries
  - right: Häuserbach

The Arnsbach is a small river in the area of Neu-Anspach in Hesse, Germany. The four-kilometer-long Arnsbach flows into the Usa near Usingen.

== See also ==
- List of rivers of Hesse
