= Fauerbach (Usa) =

River in Germany

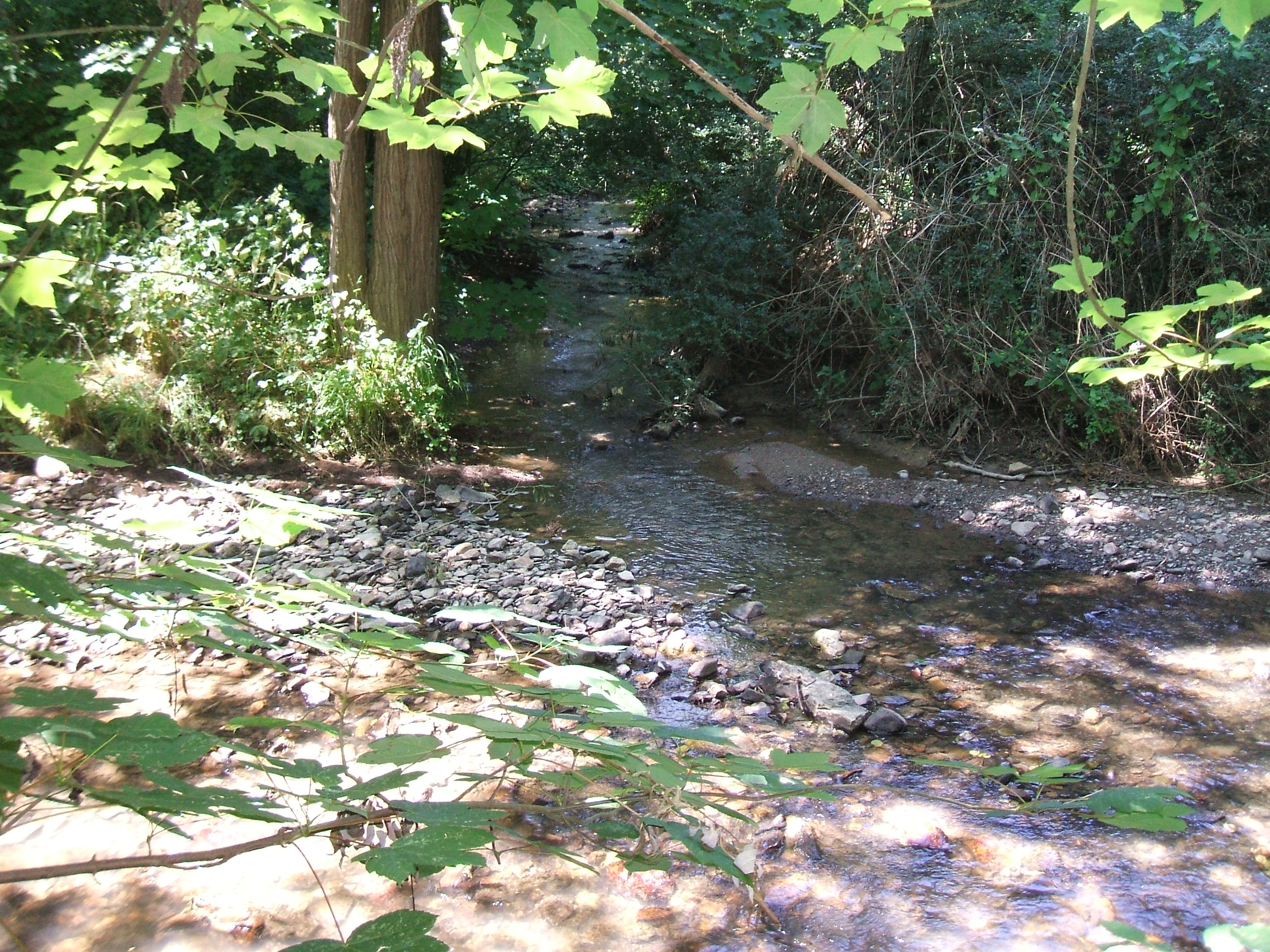

Location
- Country: Germany
- State: Hesse

Physical characteristics
- Mouth
  - location: Usa
  - coordinates: 50.3729°N 8.6821°E
- Length: 9.7 km (6.0 mi)

Basin features
- Progression: Usa→ Wetter→ Nidda→ Main→ Rhine→ North Sea

The Fauerbach is a river of Hesse, Germany. It is a left and northern tributary of the Usa in Ober-Mörlen.

== See also ==
- List of rivers of Hesse
