= Röllbach (Usa) =

River in Germany

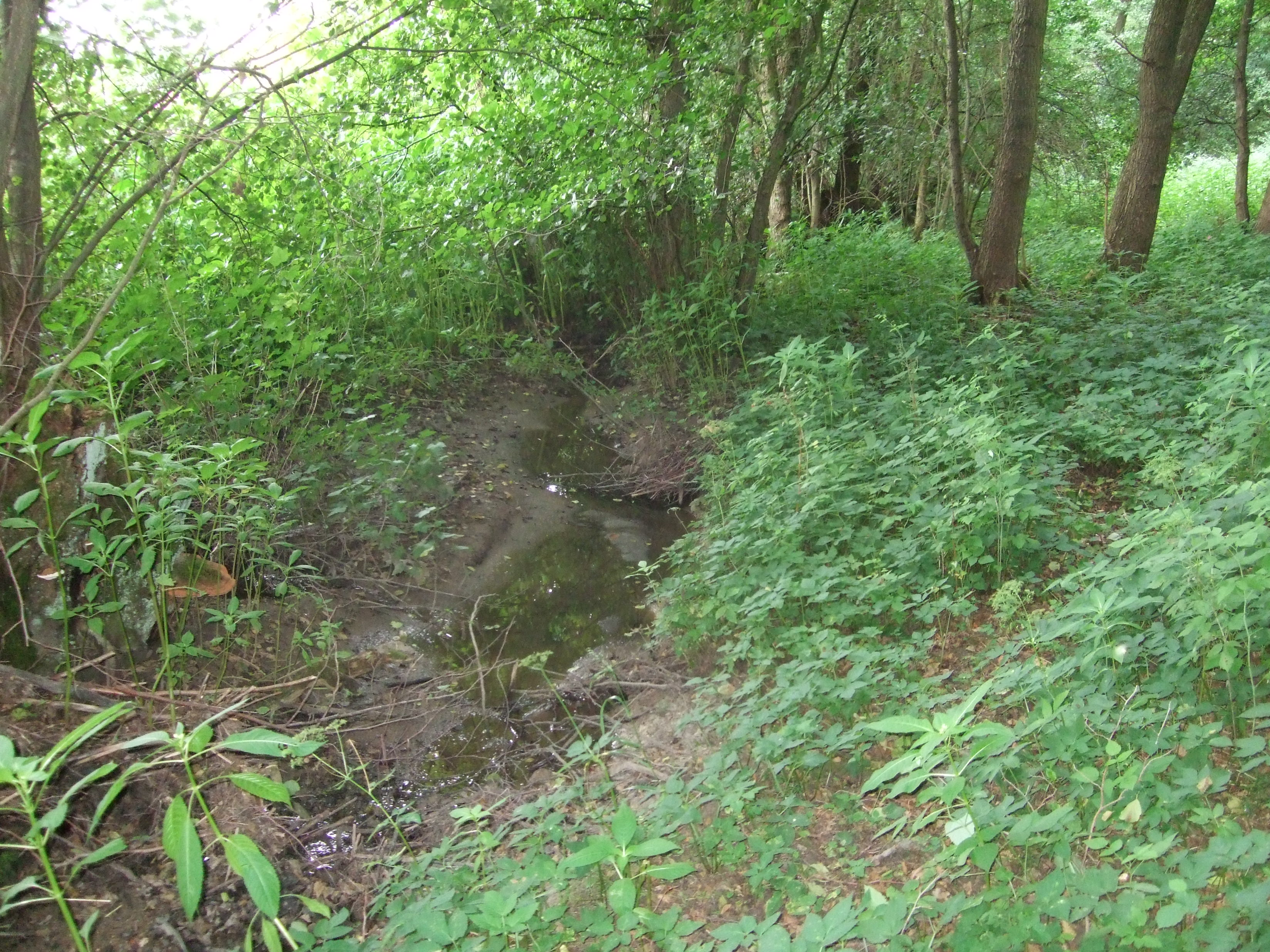

Location
- Country: Germany
- States: Hesse

Physical characteristics
- Mouth
  - location: Usa
  - coordinates: 50.3329°N 8.5545°E

Basin features
- Progression: Usa→ Wetter→ Nidda→ Main→ Rhine→ North Sea
- Tributaries
  - right: Kittelbach

Röllbach (German pronunciation: [ˈʁœlbax]) is a small river of Hesse, Germany. It is a right tributary of the Usa near Usingen.

== See also ==
- List of rivers of Hesse
