= Hausberg (Taunus) =

Coordinates: 50°24′41″N 8°36′54″E

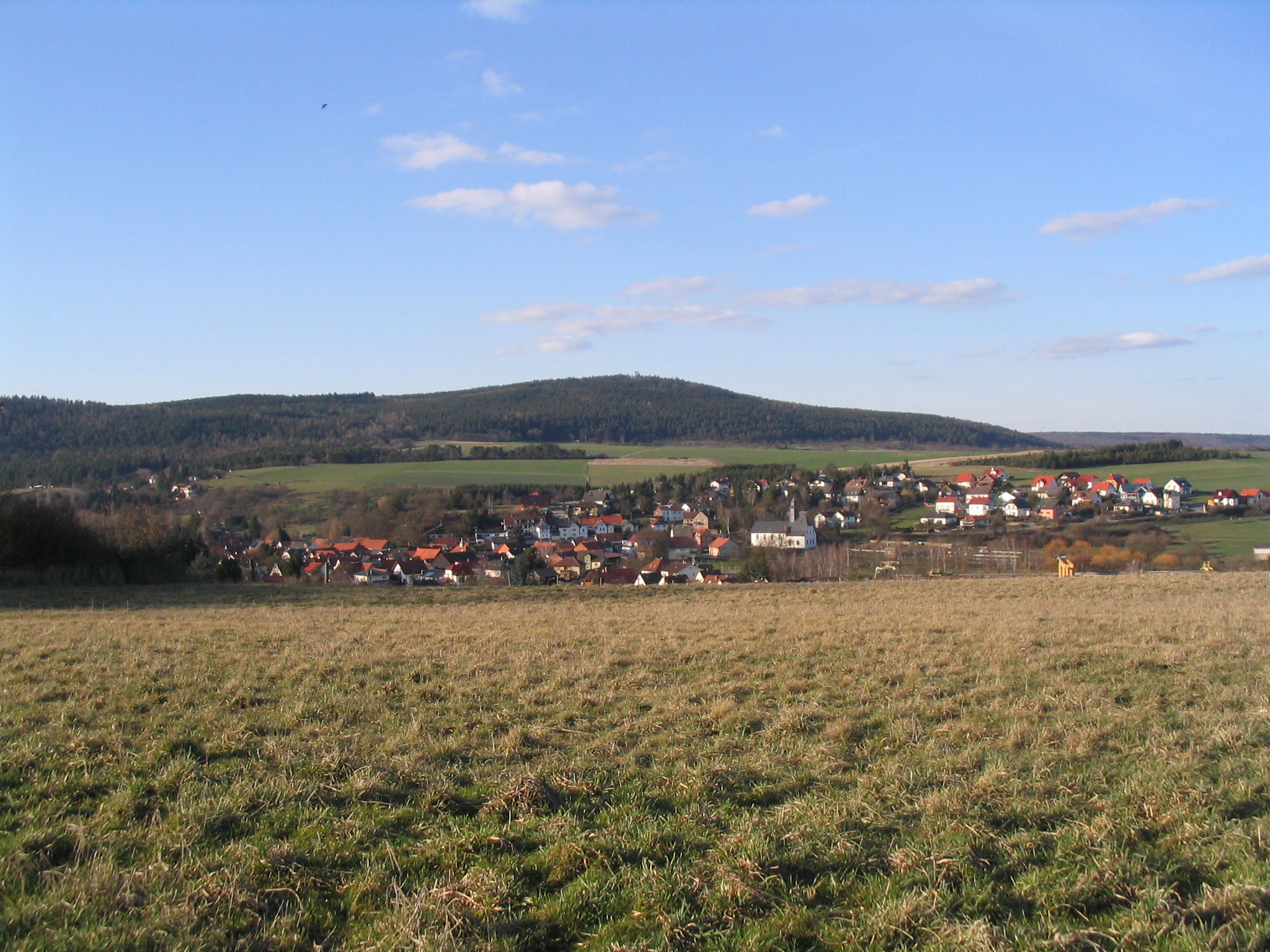
- Hausberg seen from Münster, March 2009

Highest point
- Elevation: 486 m (1,594 ft)

Geography
- Location: Hesse, Germany

The Hausberg is a mountain with an elevation of 486 m next to Butzbach in Hesse, Germany. It is part of the Taunus mountain range and located at its easternmost part, bordering the fertile landscape of the Wetterau, which is of a much lower altitude. Therefore, the mountain is well situated for look-out and in 1873 a first lookout tower was erected on its top. In 1875 a storm damaged the tower severely, but it was repaired the following year and remained in use until 1941 when it was demolished due to being in disrepair. More than 60 years later, in June 2007, the construction of a new tower started and was completed in May 2008. The new tower's total height is 23 meters, with a roofed observation deck at 19 meters.

The Hausberg and its neighbouring Brülerberg were the site of an ancient Celtic ringfort from the La Tène period. The excavation and research of its remains started in 1911. There are also remains from the Roman period in the neighbourhood. The Limes Germanicus traverses through the foothills of the Hausberg and one of its smaller forts, the Hunnenkirchhof, is located close to the mountain.

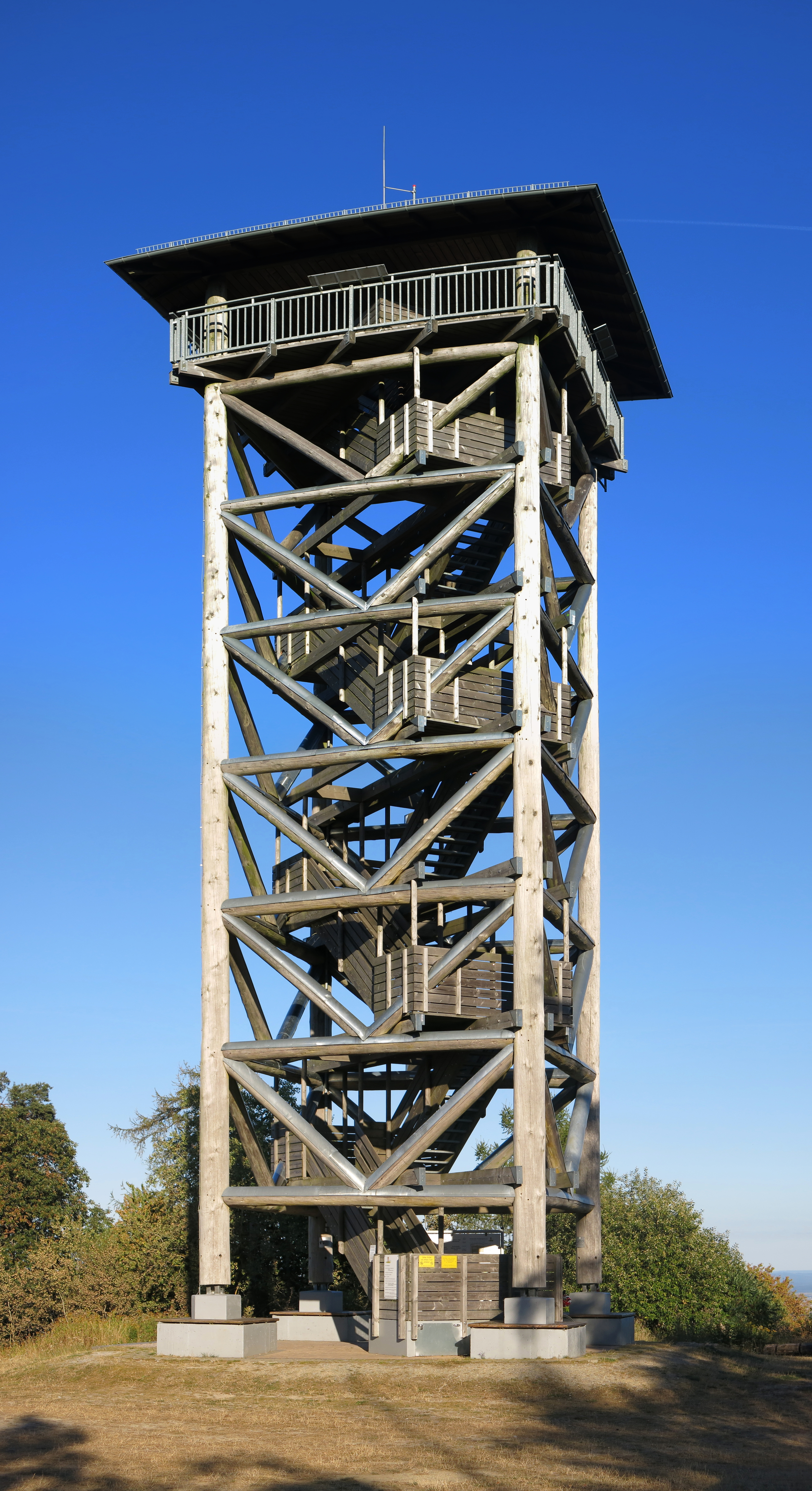
Lookout tower, August 2016

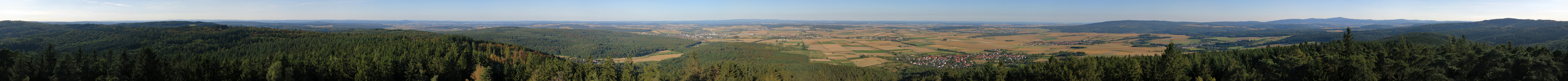
Panoramic view (360°) from the lookout tower
