= Wetterau =

Fertile area by the Wetter river in Germany

Coordinates: 50°17′N 8°57′E

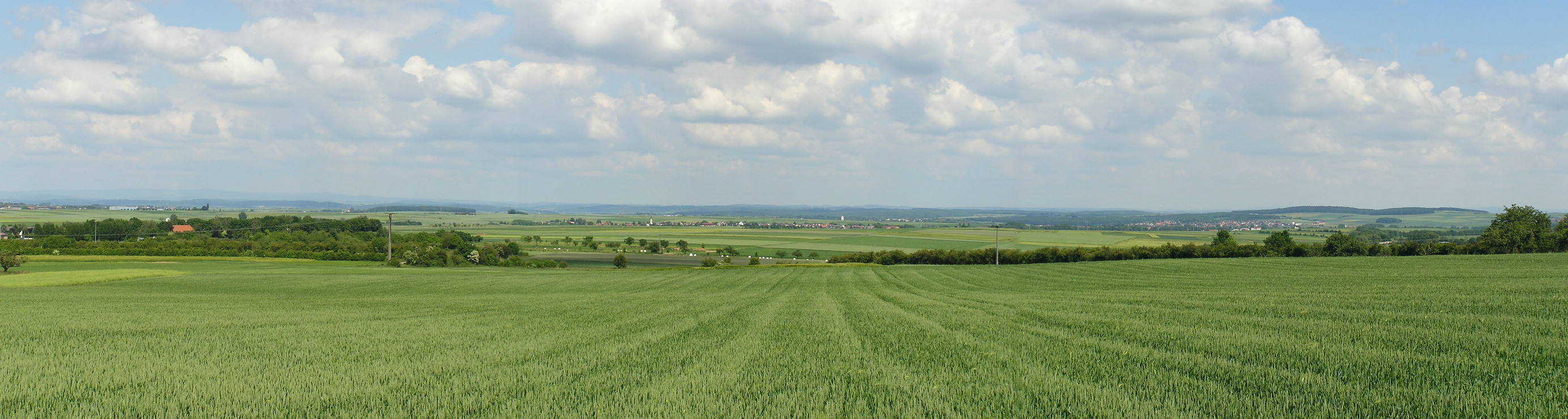
The Wetterau, photographed from the western edge between Rosbach and the district Rodheim. The view is oriented to the east; the Nidda flows through the valley in the foreground.

The Wetterau (German pronunciation: [ˈvɛtɐʔaʊ], lit. 'Wetter meadow') is a fertile undulating tract, watered by the Wetter, a tributary of the Nidda River, in the western German state of Hesse, between the hilly province Oberhessen and the north-western Taunus mountains.

Bettina von Arnim writes of Wetterau in her text Diary of a Child in the chapter "Journey to the Wetterau".

== Geography ==
The Wetterau is located north of Frankfurt am Main, on the eastern side of the Taunus and south-west of the Vogelsberg. The main part of the region is taken up by the political region Wetteraukreis. The region got its name from the small creek Wetter, but the region is crossed by several other creeks and rivers - for example, the Nidda, Nidder, Horloff and Usa.

== History ==
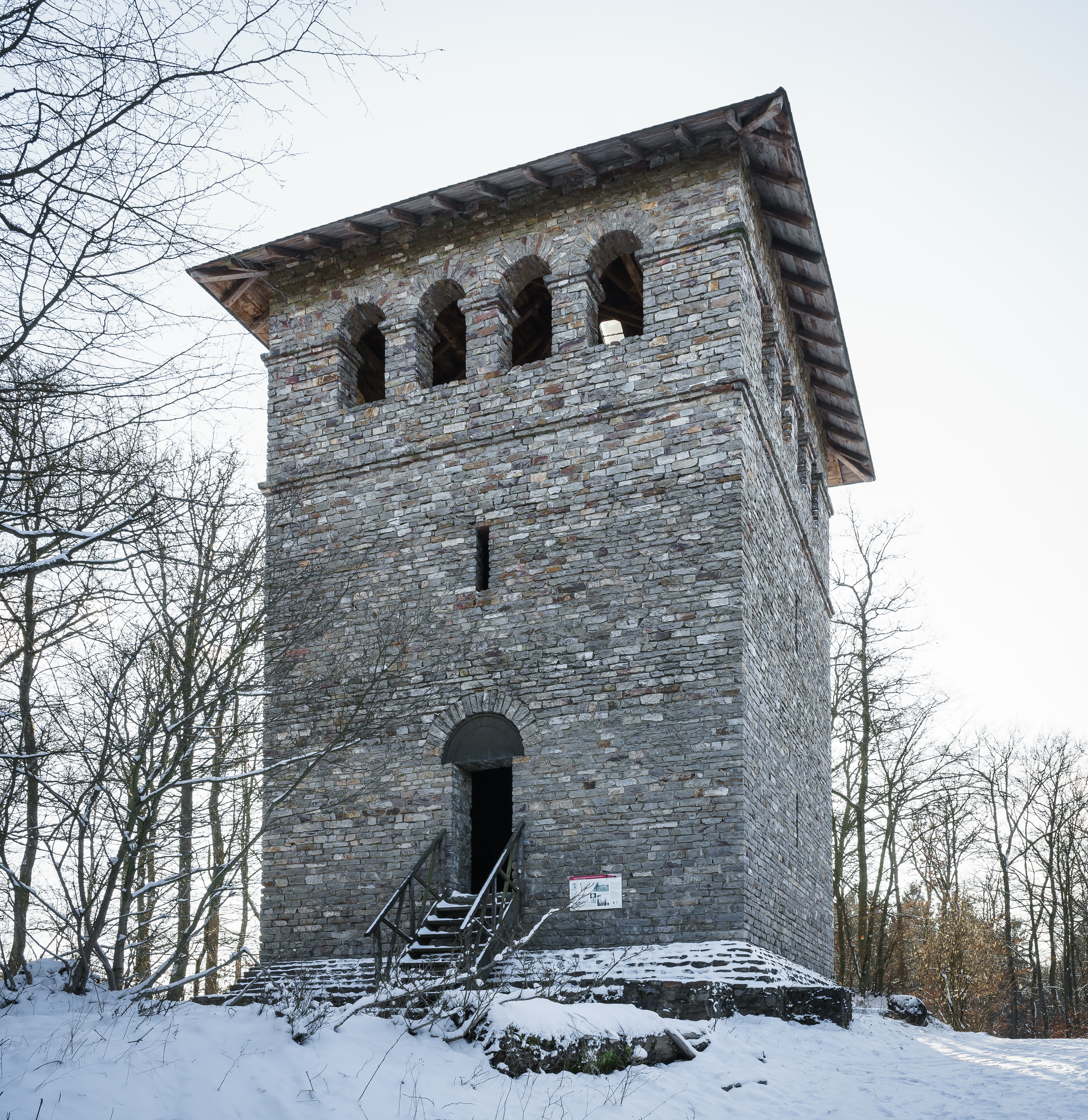
Roman tower (reconstruction) at limes

The Wetterau has a long history and is one of the oldest cultural landscapes in Germany. It was always a very fertile region and was populous from as early as the Neolithic Age. Artifacts from successive civilizations that populated the area also exist. Prominent discoveries are tombs from the Bronze Age, Stufe Wölfersheim or from the Celts, Glauberg. Many historical findings are exhibited in the Wetterau-Museum in Friedberg.

The Wetterau was of high strategic relevance for the Roman Empire during its advance into the free Germania. After the end of the Germanic and Gallic wars (58 to 51 BC) a number of Roman forts and roads were built in the Wetterau. A series of fortifications, part of the limes, surrounded the fertile Wetterau region. The region was part of Germania.

=== Middle Ages ===
The first documented reference is from 779 in the Codex Aureus of Lorsch.

The economic power of the Wetterau has increased continuously through specific promotion of its urban centres Frankfurt am Main, Wetzlar, Gelnhausen and Friedberg since Frederick I, Holy Roman Emperor. The cities with their magnificent buildings were important bases for the royal travels and central places for exercising royal rights in the areas of economy and jurisdiction. The economic power was reflected in the right for coinage of the Lords of Hagen-Münzenberg and the urban right to hold markets. Since the 13th century the latter developed into a regular series of fairs in Frankfurt and Friedberg. The Frankfurt Trade Fair still continues this tradition nowadays.

At the end of the Staufer period and with the extinction of the Münzenberg family in 1255 the different political powers of the Wetterau became more obvious, in particular the powerful families in Hanau, Eppstein and Isenburg-Büdingen.

=== Modern times ===
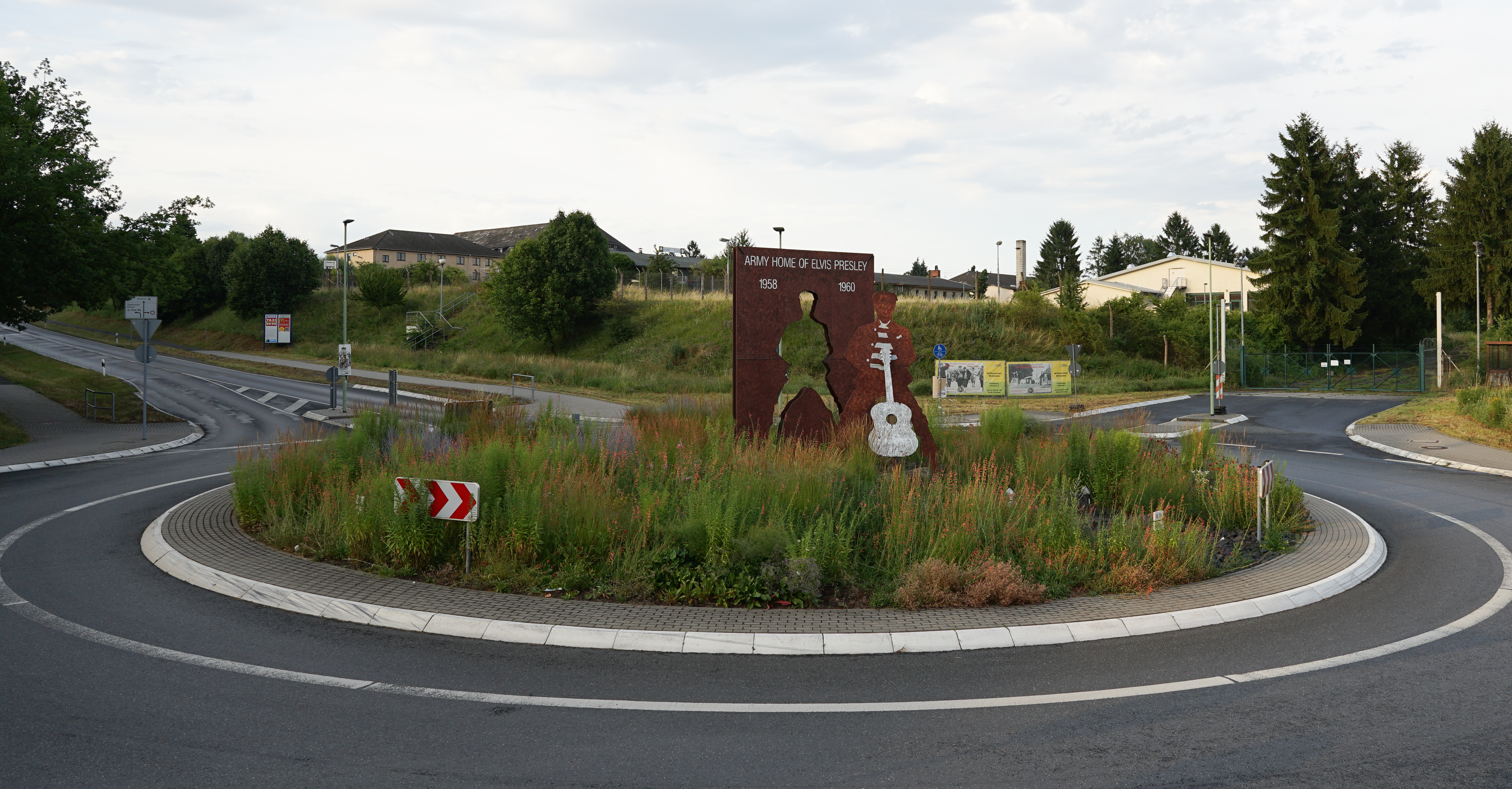
Elvis Presley monument at former Ray Barracks, Friedberg (Hesse)

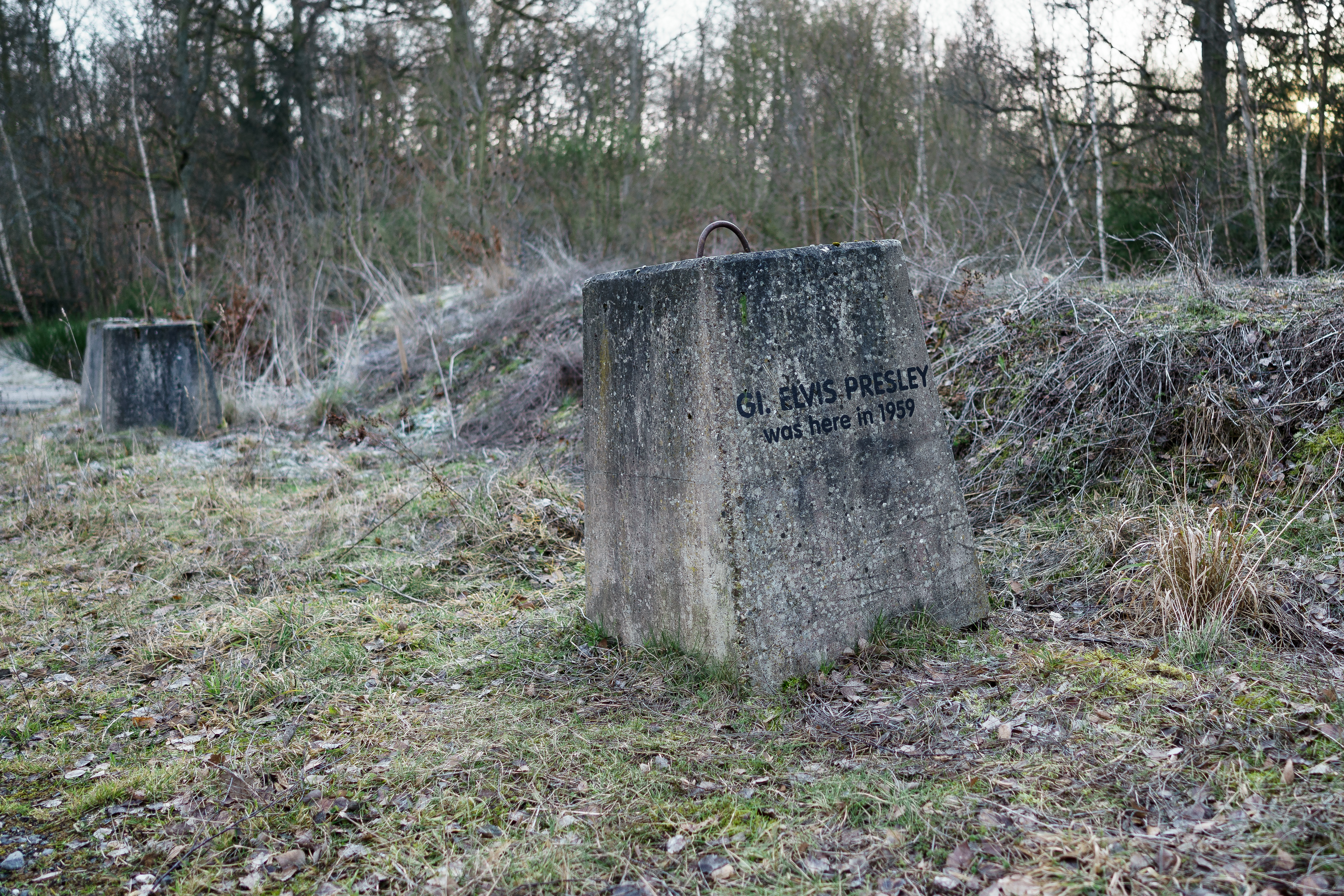
Elvis Presley memorial at former U.S. proving ground Eichkopf near Ober-Mörlen

The regional unity of the Wetterau was not primarily a political concept, but rather its result. Since 1422 the late medieval policy initially led to establishment of the estates of the realm, the alliance of knights, and lords and counts of the Wetterau. These supported the development of a regional identity that even survived increasing urban differentiation.

Four stabilizing elements characterize the transition from medieval to modern times in the Wetterau:

- Four imperial cities, of which eventually only Frankfurt had significance;
- A network of knights and nobility, the Wetterau knighthood, that was concentrated in the imperial castle in Friedberg;
- Twenty count lineages that distinguished themselves form the lower gentry;
- A number of joint ownerships of cities (Friedberg, Kronberg, Falkenstein, Gelnhausen, Lindheim, Dorheim, Staden, Florstadt); often these were identical with the two groups mentioned before.

== Sources ==
- Kümmerly+Frey: The New International Atlas. Rand McNally (1980)
