= Holzbach (Usa) =

River in Germany

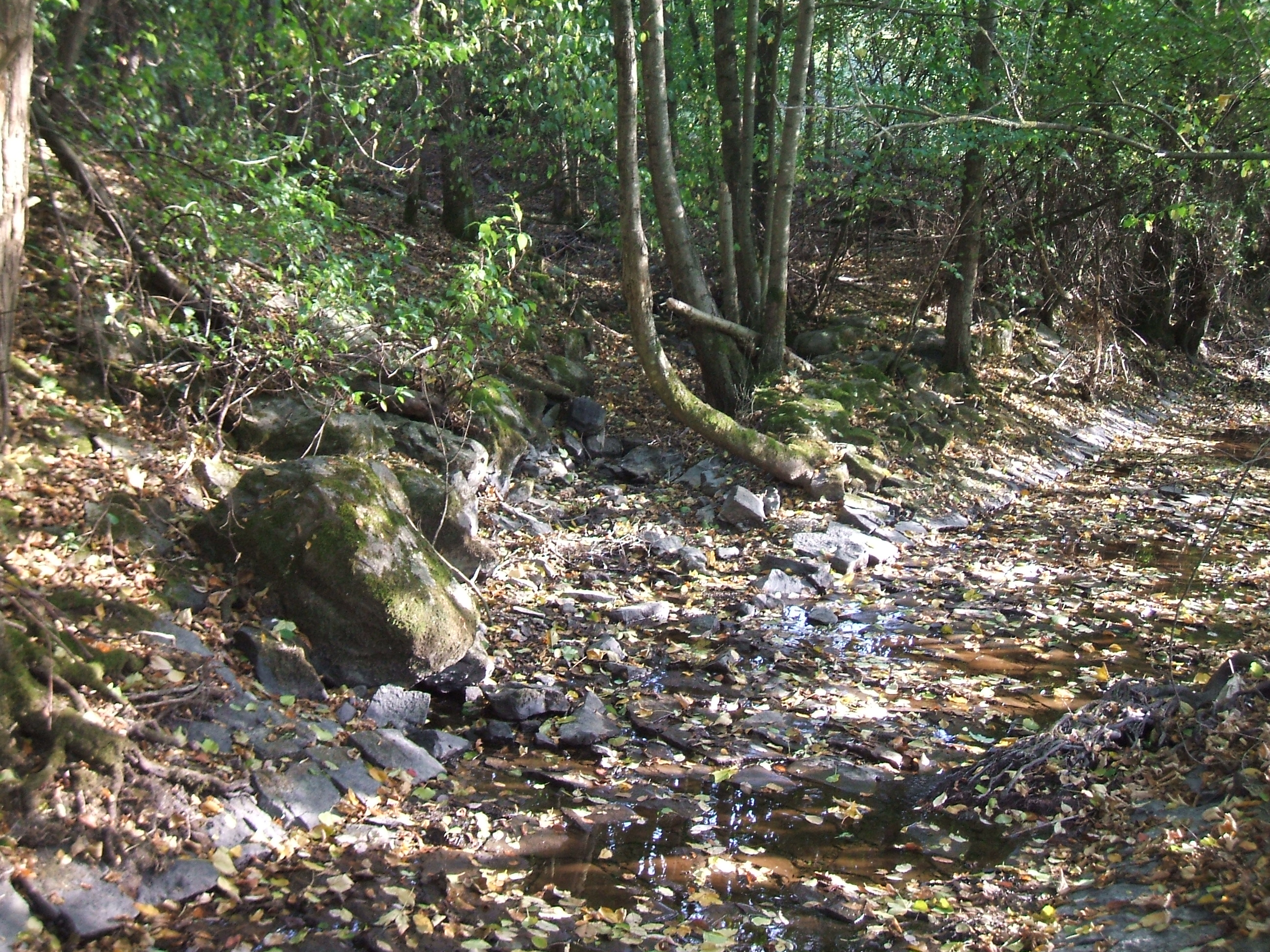

Location
- Country: Germany
- States: Hesse

Physical characteristics
- Mouth
  - location: Usa
  - coordinates: 50.3568°N 8.5925°E

Basin features
- Progression: Usa→ Wetter→ Nidda→ Main→ Rhine→ North Sea

The Holzbach (German pronunciation: [ˈhɔlt͡sˌbax]) is a river of Hesse, Germany. It is a right tributary of the Usa near Usingen-Kransberg. It only carries water intermittently and in sections. It rises from springs on the western slope of the Winterstein-Taunus ridge and crosses the northern edge of the Wehrheim district of Friedrichsthal. Below Forsthausstrasse, its valley marks the southwestern border of the Münster-Maibach sill.

== See also ==
- List of rivers of Hesse
