= Butzbach =

- Town
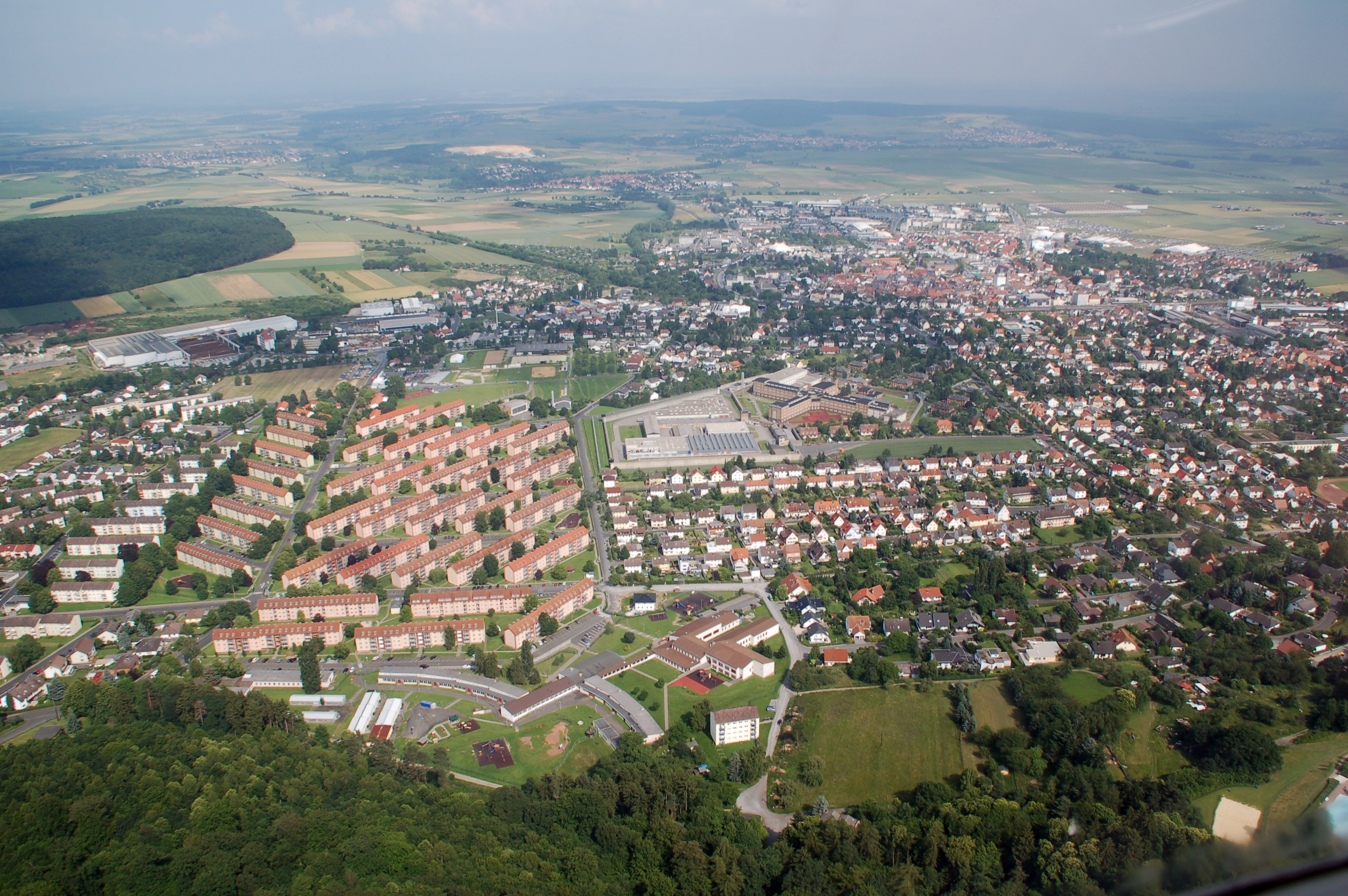
- Aerial view

- Coat of arms

- Location of Butzbach within Wetteraukreis district
- Interactive map of Butzbach
- Location within Germany Location within Hesse
- Coordinates: 50°26′12″N 8°39′44″E
- Country: Germany
- State: Hesse
- Admin. region: Darmstadt
- District: Wetteraukreis
- Subdivisions: 14 districts

Government
  - Mayor (since 2025): Sascha Huber (CDU)

Area
  - Total: 106.6 km^{2} (41.2 sq mi)
- Elevation: 199 m (653 ft)

Population (2025-12-31)
  - Total: 27,181
  - Density: 255.0/km^{2} (660.4/sq mi)
- Time zone: UTC+01:00 (CET)
  - Summer (DST): UTC+02:00 (CEST)
- Postal codes: 35510
- Dialling codes: 06033
- Vehicle registration: FB
- Website: www.stadt-butzbach.de

Butzbach (German pronunciation: [ˈbʊtsbax]) is a town in the Wetteraukreis district in Hessen, Germany. It is located approximately 16 km south of Gießen and 35 km north of Frankfurt am Main.

In 2007, the town hosted the 47th Hessentag state festival from 1 to 10 June.

The "Landgrafenschloss" ("landgraves' castle"), used by the United States Army until 1990, is now utilized by the city council. The so-called "Roman Way Housing" of the United States Army with more than 1,000 apartments was returned to the German government in October 2007 and has since been renovated and rented out to the public. The town's marketplace is enclosed by timber framing. The "Schrenzer" hill (or Heidelbeerberg, 385 m) overlooks the town and the country north of Frankfurt, called Wetterau. Another much higher mountain nearby is the Hausberg (486 m) which features a lookout tower.

== Boroughs of Butzbach ==
Butzbach consists of the boroughs Bodenrod, Butzbach (urban core), Ebersgöns, Fauerbach vor der Höhe, Griedel, Hausen-Oes, Hoch-Weisel, Kirch-Göns, Maibach, Münster, Nieder-Weisel, Ostheim, Pohl-Göns and Wiesental.

== Twin towns – sister cities ==
Butzbach is twinned with:

- Collecchio, Italy (2012)
- Eilenburg, Germany (1990)
- Saint-Cyr-l'École, France (2008)
- Teplá, Czech Republic (2008)

== Notable people ==
- Gabriel Biel (c. 1420–1495), scholastic philosopher and theologian; longtime Propst of the Brothers of the Common Life in Butzbach
- Johann Jakob Griesbach (1745–1812), biblical textual critic.
- Friedrich Ludwig Weidig (1791–1837), theologian, pastor and teacher; worked here 22 years as teacher and rector of the school
- Lorenz Diefenbach (1806–1883), librarian, pastor, Germanist, lexicographer and writer
- Friedrich Schwally (1863–1919), orientalist
- Ernst Glaeser (1902–1963), writer
- Peter Krick (born 1944), figure skater
- Dieter Enders (born 1946), chemist and asymmetric synthesis expert
- Siegfried Zielinski (born 1951), media scientist and university lecturer
- Ron Gardenhire (born 1957), baseball manager
