= Usa (Germany) =

River in Germany

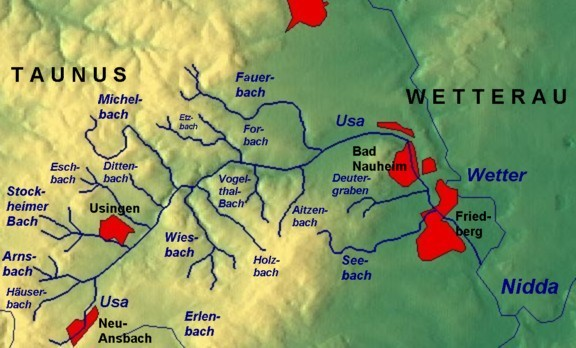
- Usa drainage

Location
- Country: Germany

Physical characteristics
- Source
  - location: Taunus
- Mouth
  - location: Wetter
  - coordinates: 50.3199°N 8.7846°E
- Length: 34.1 km (21.2 mi)
- Basin size: 184 km^{2} (71 sq mi)

Basin features
- Progression: Wetter→ Nidda→ Main→ Rhine→ North Sea

The Usa (German pronunciation: [ˈuːza]) is a river that is 34 km (21 miles) long in Hesse, Germany. It is right tributary of the Wetter, which it joins at the outskirts of Friedberg. Its source is in the Taunus mountains, near the town Neu-Anspach. The principal towns along the river are Usingen, Bad Nauheim and Friedberg.

== Tributaries ==
The following rivers are tributaries to the river Usa (from source to mouth):

- Left: Ansbach, Arnsbach, Schleichenbach, Stockheimer Bach, Eschbach, Dittenbach, Michelbach, Detzelbach, Forbach, Fauerbach
- Right: Heisterbach, Schlichenbach, Röllbach, Wiesbach, Holzbach, Vogelthal-Bach, Aitzenbach, Hainbach, Deutergraben, Seebach

== See also ==
- List of rivers of Hesse
