= Friedberg, Hesse =

Friedberg
- Town
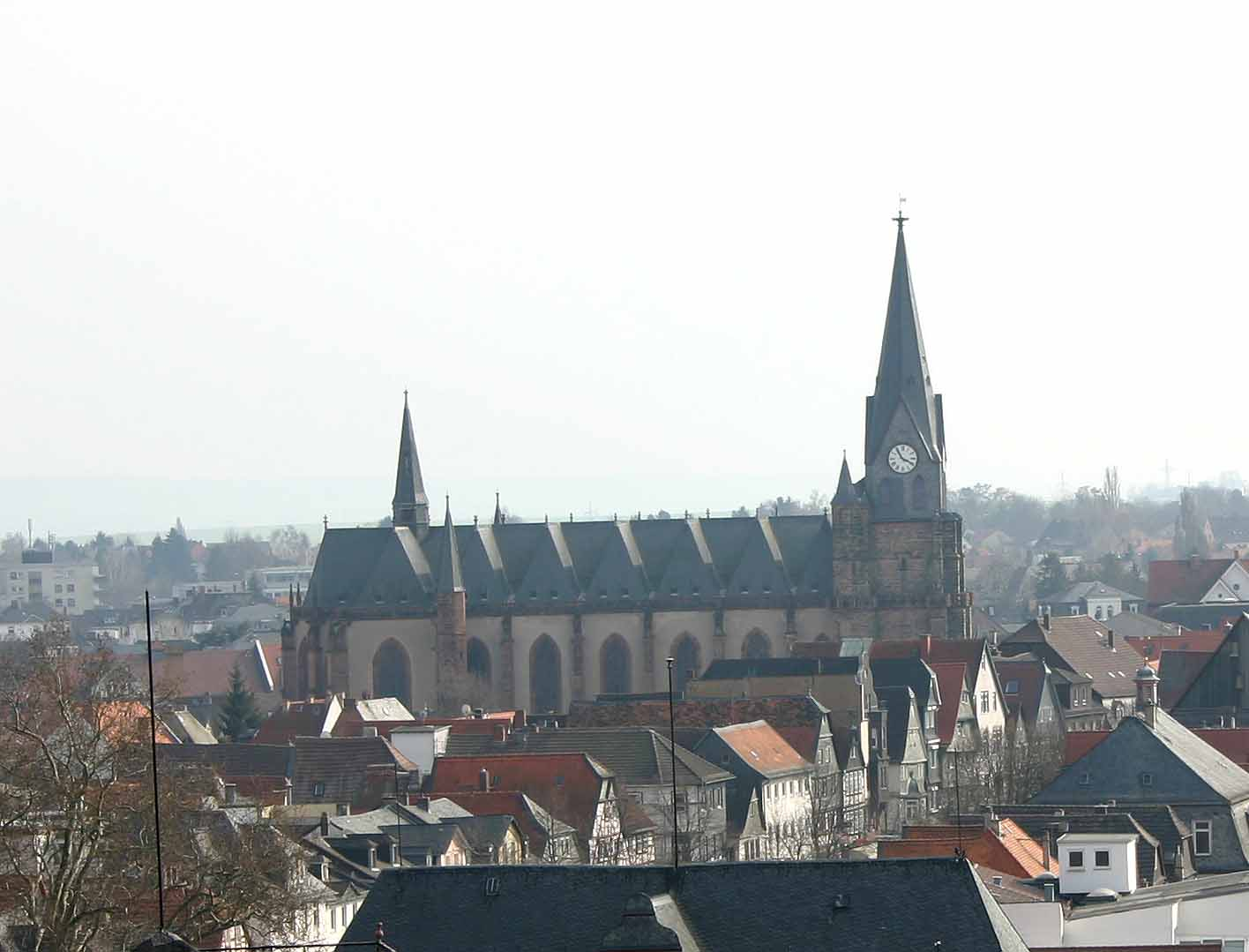
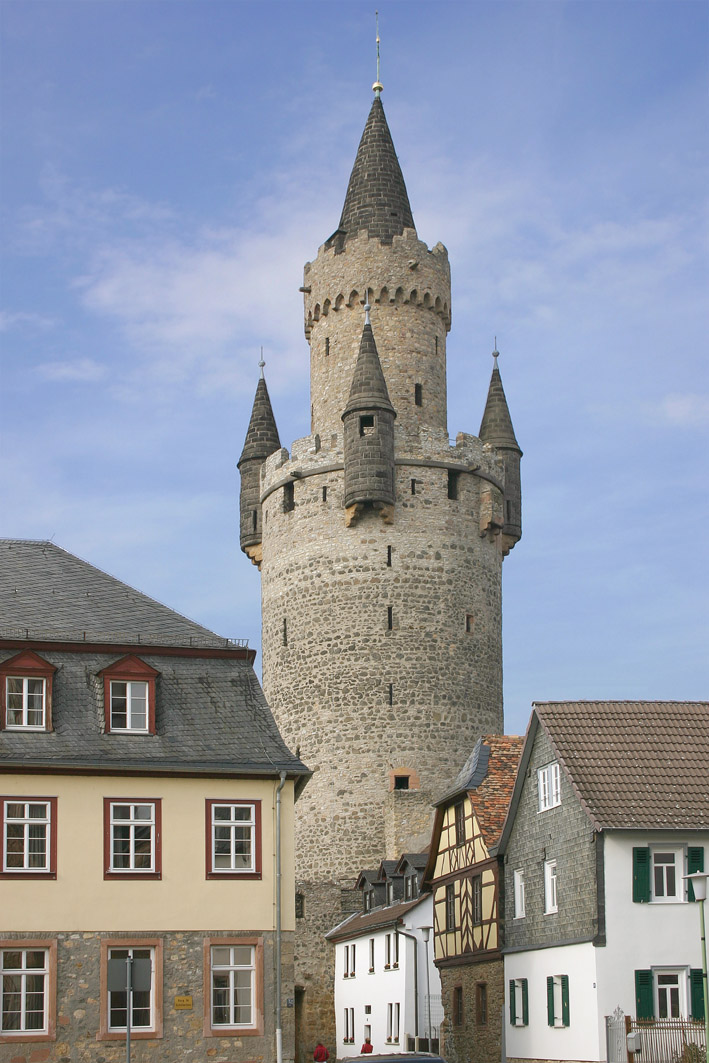
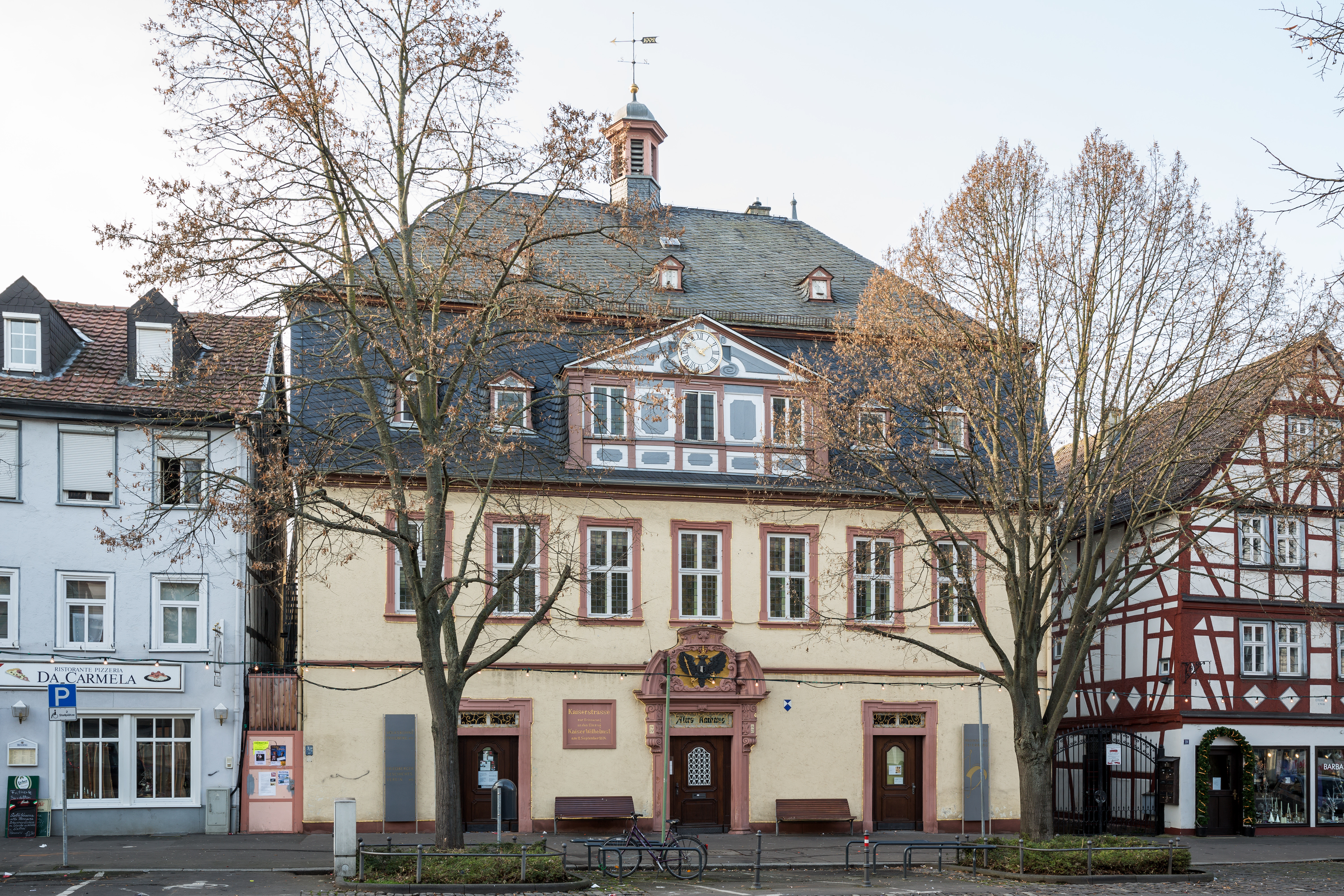
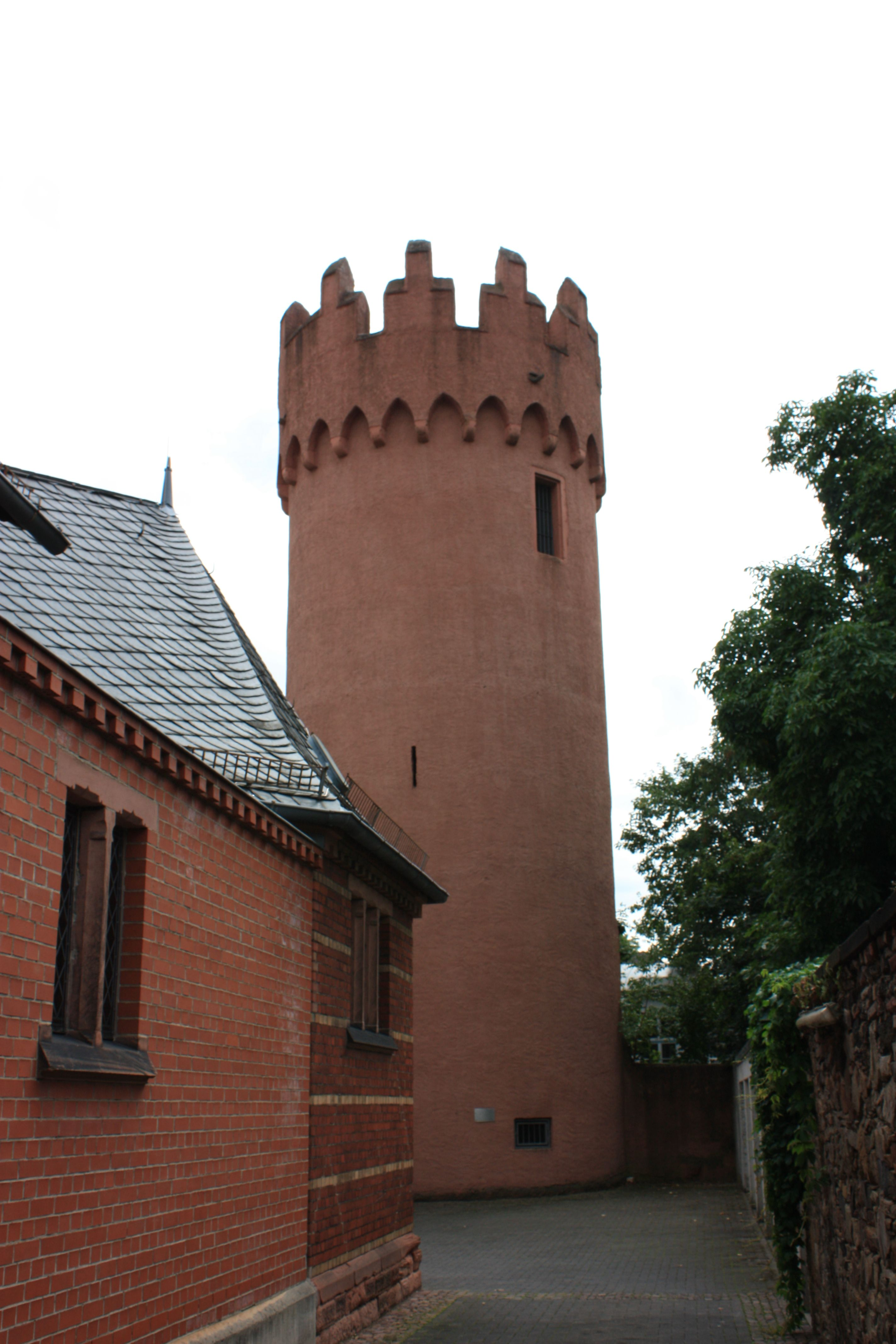
- Old town Adolfsturm Old town hall Roter Turm

- Flag Coat of arms

- Location of Friedberg within Wetteraukreis district
- Interactive map of Friedberg
- Location within Germany Location within Hesse
- Coordinates: 50°20′N 8°45′E
- Country: Germany
- State: Hesse
- Admin. region: Darmstadt
- District: Wetteraukreis
- Subdivisions: 6 districts

Government
  - Mayor (2023–29): Kjetil Dahlhaus

Area
  - Total: 50.18 km^{2} (19.37 sq mi)
- Elevation: 140 m (460 ft)

Population (2025-12-31)
  - Total: 30,448
  - Density: 606.8/km^{2} (1,572/sq mi)
- Time zone: UTC+01:00 (CET)
  - Summer (DST): UTC+02:00 (CEST)
- Postal codes: 61169
- Dialling codes: 06031
- Vehicle registration: FB
- Website: www.friedberg-hessen.de

Friedberg (German pronunciation: [ˈfʁiːtbɛʁk]; official name: Friedberg (Hessen)) is a town and the capital of the Wetteraukreis district, in Hesse, Germany. In 1966, the town hosted the sixth Hessentag state festival, in 1979 the 19th.

== Geographical location ==
Friedberg is located about 30 kilometres (19 miles) north of Frankfurt am Main in the Wetterau region. The town is located on the river Usa, just before it flows into the Wetter. The parish church in the center of the town is located 159 meters (522 ft) above sea level. To the west, the Friedberg area extends into the Taunus mountain range up to the 518 meters (1,699 ft) high Steinkopf.

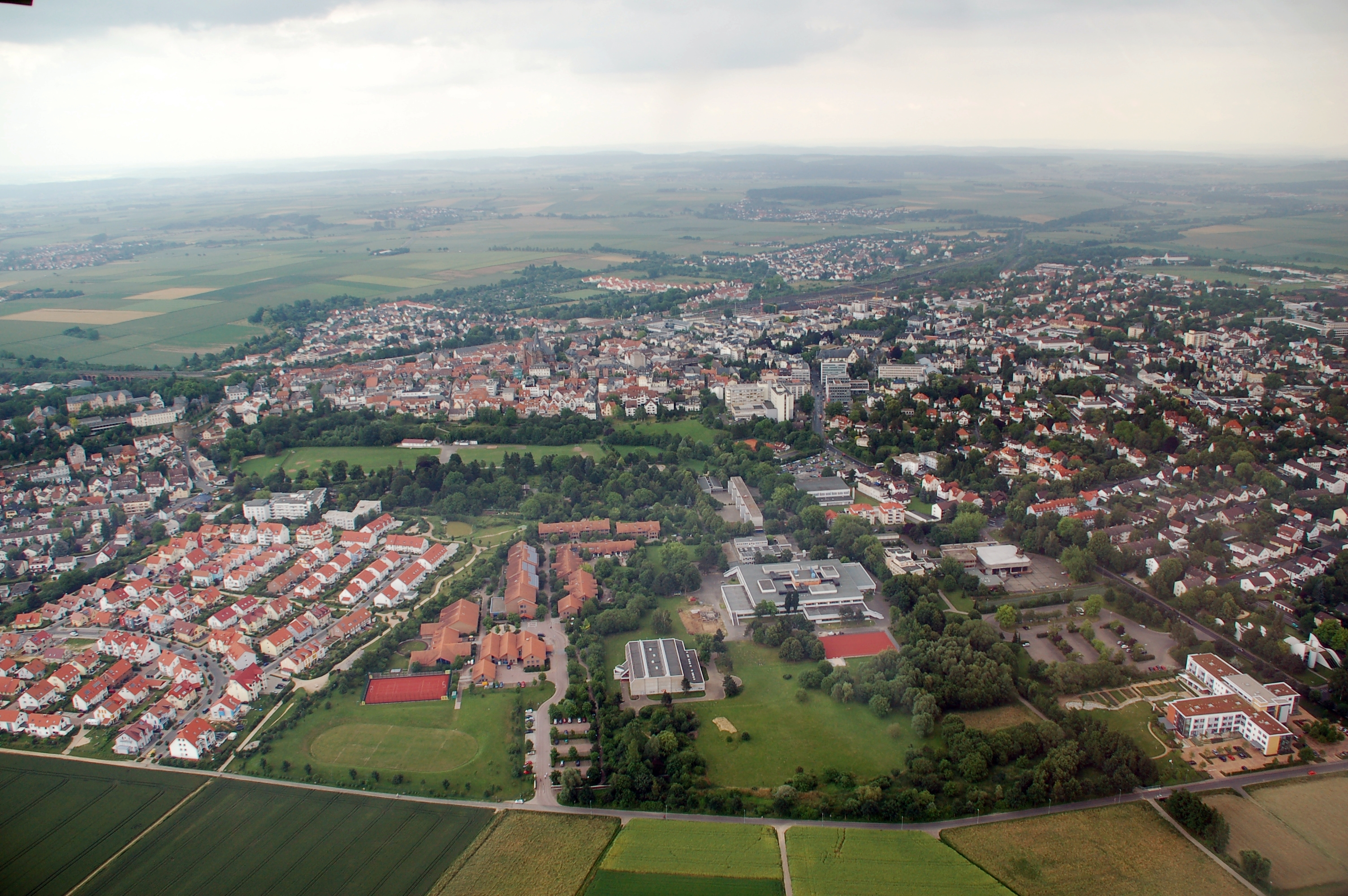
Aerial view of Friedberg

== Division of the town ==
The town consists of 7 districts:

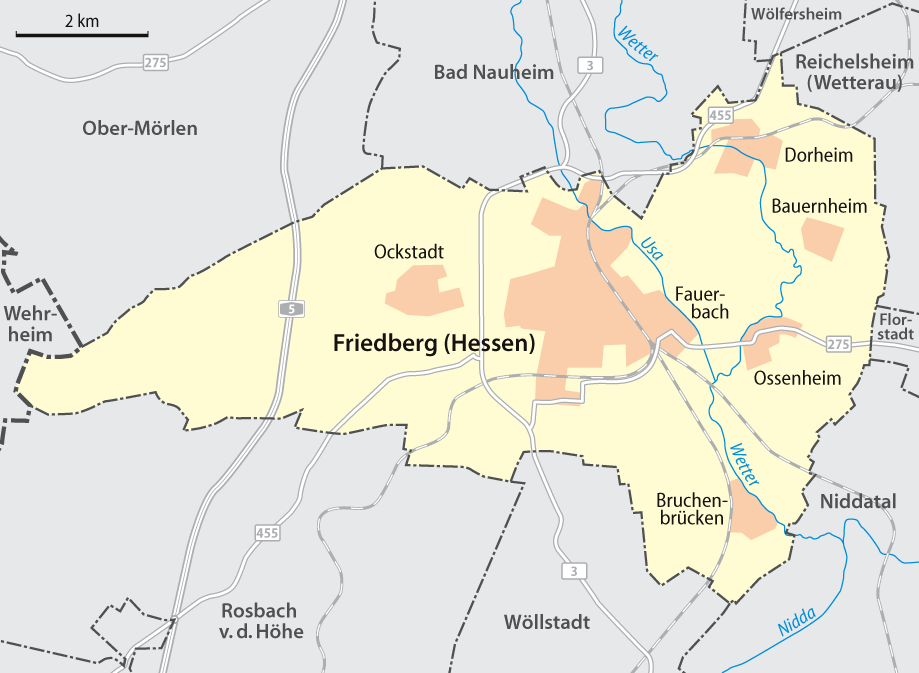
Map of Friedberg

- Bruchenbrücken
- Friedberg
- Dorheim
- Ockstadt
- Bauernheim
- Fauerbach
- Ossenheim

== History ==
The old city was refounded by the Hohenstaufen dynasty of the Holy Roman Empire, conveniently located at important trading routes. The city initially rivaled Frankfurt am Main economically, with an important annual trading fair, and initial rapid expansion, though its economic fortunes soon dwindled.

City tranquility was hampered by continuous rivalry between the two entities that made up Friedberg: The city and the castle of Friedberg that were politically independent from each other and in permanent competition, often quite maliciously, resulting in bitter rivalry that culminated once in the ransacking and destruction of the castle by angry citizens. In central Italy and Lombardy similar struggles between count and commune fueled the politics of Guelf and Ghibelline parties.

The city became a Free Imperial City (Freie Reichsstadt) of the Holy Roman Empire with a charter given in 1211. From the 14th-15th centuries, a 'noble republic' existed where twelve noble families shared a single castle. Between 1337 and 1498, the constitution for the castle developed with a network of knightly families with rights to elect a Burggraf (burgrave), two Baumeister, and twelve Regimentsburgmannen. They carried out numerous functions such as representing the community, maintaining the buildings and governing the affairs of the city. The Friedberg 'noble republic' was unusual in that it was sustained by a large number of families and its organization was formalized by a constitution. Under Napoleon, it was incorporated in the Grand Duchy of Hesse (Hesse-Darmstadt).

Friedberg sits atop a basalt plateau overlooking the Usa and has been populated at least since Roman times. The relics of a Mesolithic settlement have been found in Bruchenbrücken, a suburb of Friedberg. Castle Hill was the location of a Roman military camp, part of the limes or border fortifications and presumably identical with the castellum in monte tauno that is quoted in Roman records during the 1st century AD, though this is still under discussion. Ruins of the camp, as well as other Roman ruins, have been found and conserved, such as the remains of Roman public baths (thermae). The Roman settlement was abandoned during the retreat of the Romans on the Rhine frontier by 260 AD. The crown and ports atop the Adolfsturm (the most prominent feature of the Friedberg castle) was restored during the 1980s.

Friedberg's old town quarter once housed a prosperous Jewish community that was totally wiped out during World War II. Many of Friedberg's Jews fled to Palestine and the United States before the Holocaust, but all remaining Jews were deported in 1942 to Treblinka. The Judenbad (Jewish bath) contains a memorial to the fallen Jewish soldiers who fought for their fatherland during World War I. Today, only the medieval Jewish ceremonial bath, old synagogue arson memorial, and memorial plaque at one of the city's secondary schools are reminders of this part of the city's past. Sir Ernest Oppenheimer, diamond mining entrepreneur and former owner of De Beers was born and raised in Friedberg.

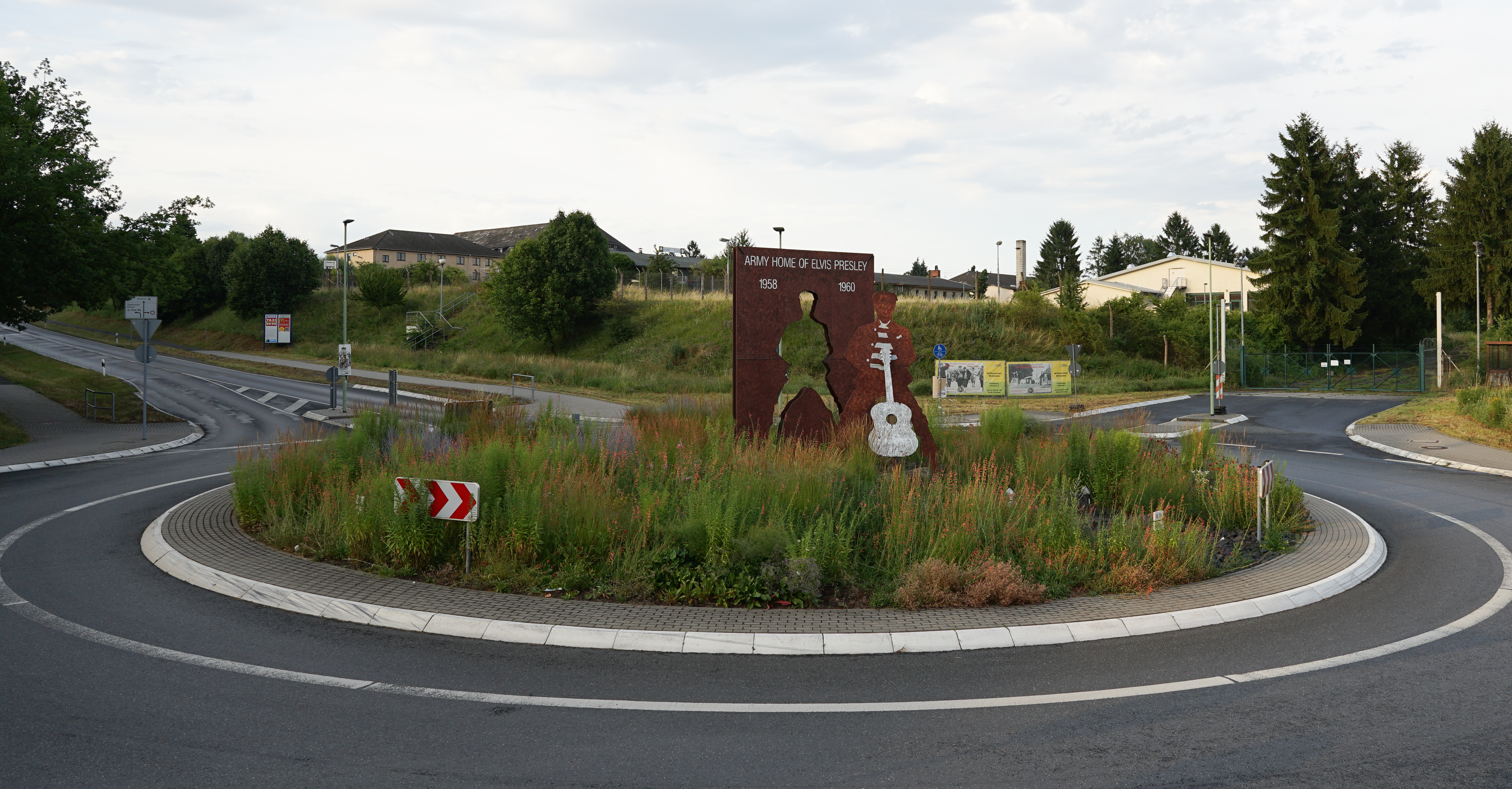
Elvis Presley-Monument at former Ray Barracks, Friedberg (Hesse), Germany

Friedberg was the home to the U.S. Army installation Ray Barracks. From approximately 1956 to 2007, Ray Barracks was the home of 3rd Brigade 3rd Armored Division. Elvis Presley served in 1st Bn 32nd Armor, whose motor pool and tanks were used in filming Presley's "GI Blues" (1960). The 1st Brigade 1st Armored Division was located here as well as in Gießen, Germany. The 1st Brigade (otherwise known as Ready First) was located at Ray Barracks from 1992 to 2007 when the installation was closed permanently and was returned to the city of Friedberg. The base is notable as the duty station of Elvis Presley during his military stint in Europe, who lived in nearby Bad Nauheim. Elvis Presley Platz was named for the American star and is in the main shopping center of the town. Presley's battalion, redesignated the 4th Battalion, 67th Armor, "Bandits," would be later commanded back-to-back by West Point classmates and future Army Generals Albert Bryant, Jr. and Martin Dempsey (the former Chairman of the Joint Chiefs of Staff), who maintained their office above the "Elvis Aaron Presley Mess Hall," originally funded by Presley. Ray Barracks is further known for being the first duty station of former US Secretary of State and retired four-star General Colin Powell, who was stationed there as a Second Lieutenant in 1958.

== Transport ==
Friedberg's main station is on the Main-Weser Railway and is the northern terminal of Frankfurt's S-Bahn line S6 and also a stop for German Intercity trains and several regional railway lines.

== Twin towns – sister cities ==
Friedberg is twinned with:

- Entroncamento, Portugal
- Magreglio, Italy
- Villiers-sur-Marne, France
- Chippenham, United Kingdom

Friedberg was previously twinned with Bishop's Stortford in the United Kingdom but in 2011, the English town council controversially ended its 45-year-old relationship with the city, as well as Villiers-sur-Marne in France.

== Notable people ==
- Erasmus Alberus (1500–1553), humanist, religious reformer and friend of Martin Luther
- Hayim ben Bezalel (died 1588), rabbi
- Leopold Cassella (1766–1847), entrepreneur
- Siegfried Schmid (1774–1859), writer
- Abraham Marcus Hirschsprung (1789–1871), founder of A.M. Hirschsprung & Sønner
- Oscar Hertwig (1849–1922), zoologist
- Richard Hertwig (1850–1937), zoologist
- Albert Windisch (1878–1967), painter, Academy Professor and typographer
- Sir Ernest Oppenheimer (1880–1957), diamond and gold mining entrepreneur, financier and philanthropist, controlled De Beers and founded the Anglo American Corporation of South Africa
- Albert Stohr (1890–1961), bishop of Mainz
- Ingrid Hornef (born 1940), painter, installation artist, sculptor
- Herfried Münkler (born 1951), political scientist
- Mathias Herrmann (born 1962), actor
- René Pollesch (1962–2024), theatre director and playwright
- Benjamin Herrmann (born 1971), film producer
- Ike Moriz (born 1972), singer, songwriter and actor
- Christof Leng (born 1975), politician
- Dexter Langen (born 1980), footballer
- Kamghe Gaba (born 1984), sprinter
- Till Helmke (born 1984), sprinter
- Kollegah (born 1984), rapper
