= Ober-Mörlen =

- Municipality
- Coat of arms

- Location of Ober-Mörlen within Wetteraukreis district
- Interactive map of Ober-Mörlen
- Location within Germany Location within Hesse
- Coordinates: 50°22′22″N 8°41′26″E
- Country: Germany
- State: Hesse
- Admin. region: Darmstadt
- District: Wetteraukreis
- Subdivisions: 2 districts

Government
  - Mayor (2018–24): Kristina Paulenz (SPD)

Area
  - Total: 37.65 km^{2} (14.54 sq mi)
- Elevation: 240 m (790 ft)

Population (2025-12-31)
  - Total: 5,768
  - Density: 153.2/km^{2} (396.8/sq mi)
- Time zone: UTC+01:00 (CET)
  - Summer (DST): UTC+02:00 (CEST)
- Postal codes: 61239
- Dialling codes: 06002
- Vehicle registration: FB
- Website: www.ober-moerlen.de

Ober-Mörlen (German pronunciation: [ˈoːbɐ ˈmœʁlən], lit. 'Upper Mörlen', in contrast to "Lower Mörlen") is a municipality in the Wetteraukreis, in Hesse, Germany. It is located approximately 29 kilometers north of Frankfurt am Main.

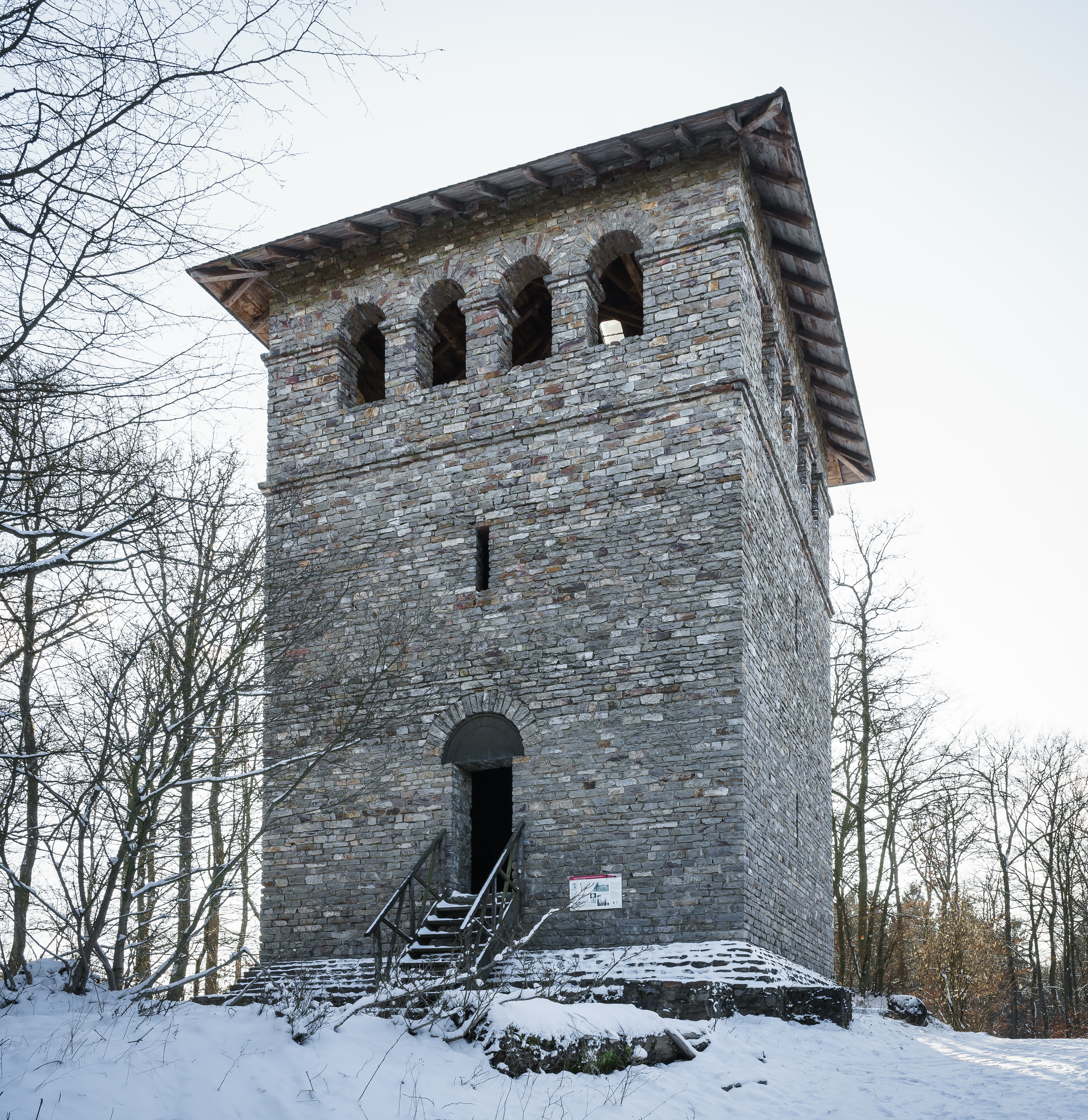
Cultural sight: Roman tower (reconstruction) at Gaulskopf / Limes

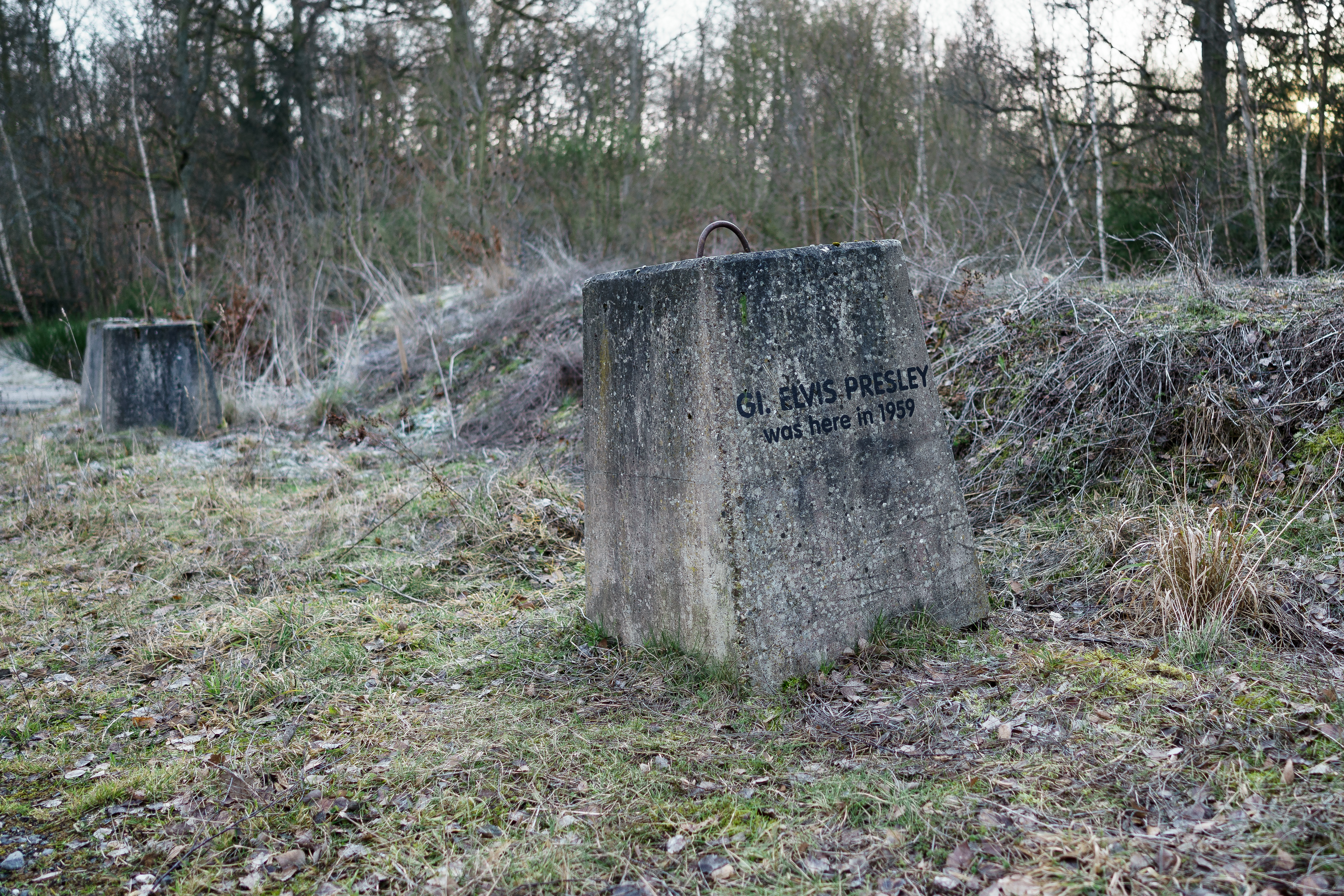
Elvis Presley Memorial at former U.S. proving ground Eichkopf near Ober-Mörlen
