= Wetter (river) =

River in Hesse, Germany

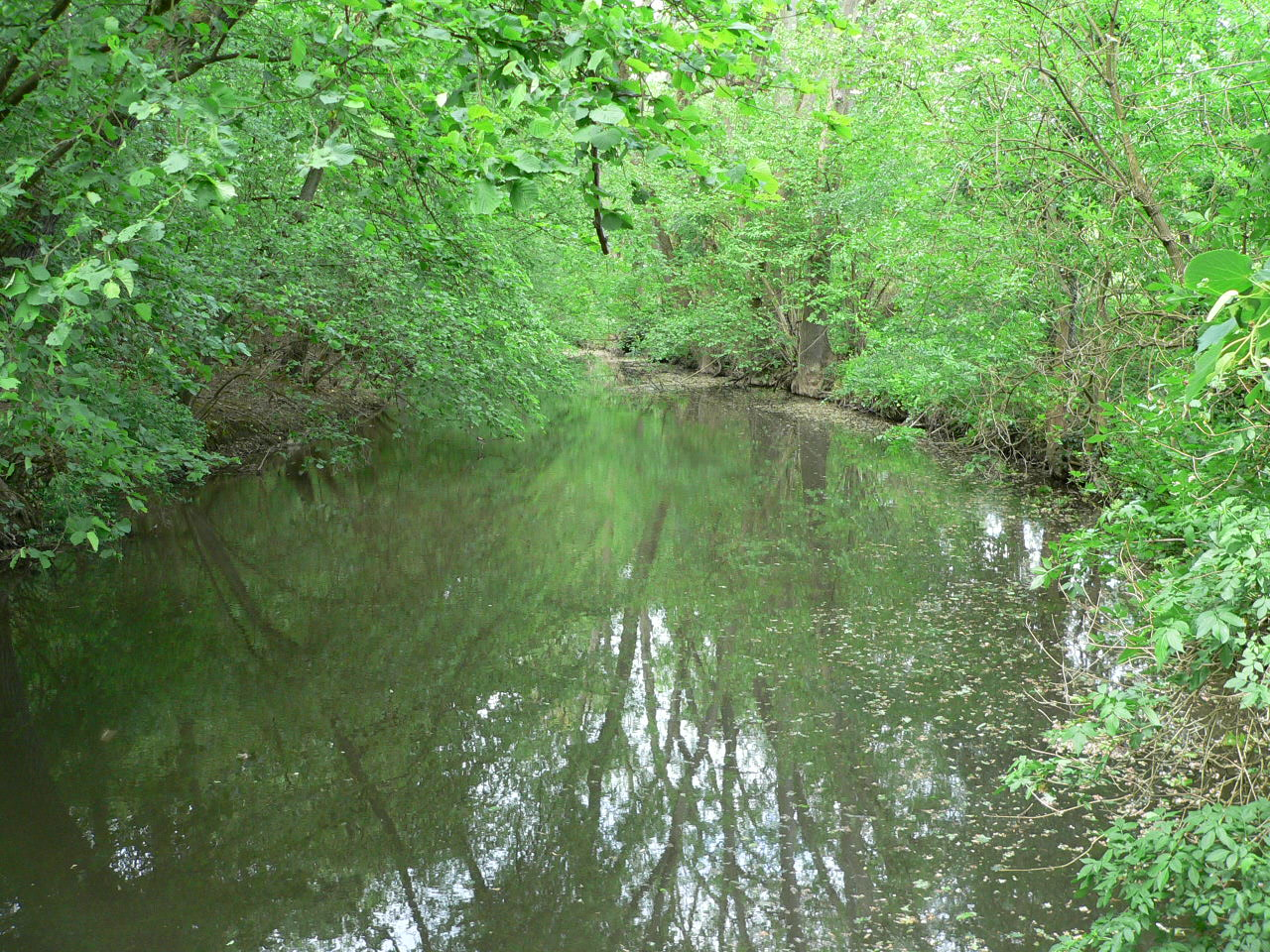
- Wetter river at Lich

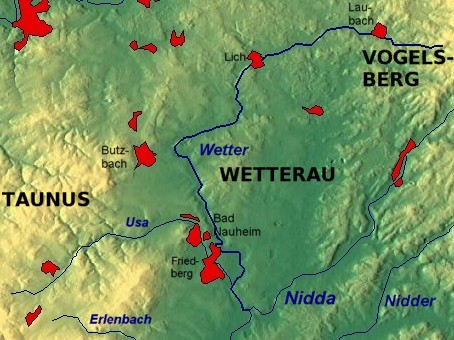

Location
- Country: Germany
- State: Hesse

Physical characteristics
- Source
  - location: Vogelsberg
- Mouth
  - location: Nidda
  - coordinates: 50°17′52″N 8°48′42″E
- Length: 68.8 km (42.8 mi)
- Basin size: 517 km^{2} (200 sq mi)

Basin features
- Progression: Nidda→ Main→ Rhine→ North Sea
- Tributaries
  - right: Äschersbach, Usa

The Wetter (German pronunciation: [ˈvɛtɐ]) is a 69-kilometre-long (43 mi) river in the state of Hesse, Germany. It is a right tributary to the Nidda which itself is a right tributary of the Main.

After leaving the Vogelsberg mountain range the river flows through the Wetterau, a fertile landscape just north of Frankfurt, which is named after the river. The principal towns along the river are Laubach, Lich, Bad Nauheim and Friedberg. The Wetter receives its largest tributary, the Usa, at Friedberg just before it finally joins the Nidda at Niddatal-Assenheim.

== Tributaries ==
The following rivers are tributaries to the river Wetter (from source to mouth):

- Left: Heegbrückerbach
- Right: Hirtenbach, Laubach, Lauter, Äschersbach, Albach, Usa, Straßbach
