= Pretorius =

Origin
- Origin: Latin
- Meaning: Leader

Pretorius is a common Afrikaans surname.

Recorded in several forms (including Praetor, Praetorius, Pratorius, Pretorius, (German), and in English Preater, Preter and Pretor), Pretorius is a surname of Germanic origins, although the ultimate origin is the Roman (Latin) word "praetor". This literally meant "leader", but was used in Imperial Rome to describe officials who led processions, as well as the Praetorian Guard, who provided the security for the Senate and the Imperial Roman family. Although apparently first recorded in England several centuries before Germany, which is probably because of lost medieval records, it is rare in England, although now found in some numbers in Austria, Switzerland and South Africa.

== People with the surname Pretorius ==
- André Pretorius, South African rugby player
- Andries Pretorius (1798–1853), Boer leader
- Andries Pretorius (rugby player), South African rugby player
- Karla Pretorius (1990-) South African and international netballer
- Dewald Pretorius, South African cricketer
- Dewald Pretorius (rugby union), South African rugby player
- Dwaine Pretorius, South African cricketer
- Frans Pretorius, South African-born, Canadian physicist
- Fransjohan Pretorius (1949), South African historian of the Second Boer War (1899–1902)
- Giovanni Pretorius (1972–2021), South African Olympic boxer
- Hattingh Pretorius, South African military commander
- Jackie Pretorius, racecar driver
- Jaco Pretorius, South African rugby player
- Johan Pretorius, South African separatist
- Kosie Pretorius, Namibian politician
- Marianne Pretorius, South African rock climber
- Mark Pretorius, South African theologian and philosopher
- Mark Pretorius (rugby union), South African rugby player
- Marthinus Wessel Pretorius first president of the South African Republic (often known as the Transvaal Republic) and son of Andries
- Nico Pretorius, South African rugby player
- Ryan Pretorius, American football place kicker from South Africa
- Sarel Pretorius, South African rugby player
- Spanner Pretorius, South African rugby player
- Trompie Pretorius, South African rugby player
- Johannes Christiaan (JC) Pretorius

== Fictional Characters ==
- Doctor Septimus Pretorius, fictional mad scientist in Bride of Frankenstein
- Edward Pretorius, fictional scientist and main antagonist in the horror film From Beyond

== See also ==
- Praetorius
- Pretoria
- Pastorius (disambiguation)
- Pistorius
