= Pfister (surname) =

- Language: German

Origin
- Meaning: baker (bakery)
- Region of origin: Bavaria, Switzerland, Austria

Other names
- Variant forms: Pister, Pfisterer, Feaster; Bäcker, Pistorius

Pfister is a German surname.

== Etymology ==
Pfister is an occupational surname derived from the Middle High German word phister, meaning baker, via the High German consonant shift that transformed the "p" into "pf". It is an occupational title based on the Latin word for baker, pistor.

The name is found most commonly in the regions where Upper German dialects are spoken (southern Germany, Austria and Switzerland), which were once part of the Roman Empire, while the native German word for baker, Bäcker, is found elsewhere.

The etymology is evident in old towns throughout these parts where a "Pfisterngasse" (Baker Street) is commonly found, such as Pfisterngasse in Solothurn.

=== Related names ===
- The surname Pister is a variant of Pfister where the High German consonant shift did not happen.
- The surname Feaster was adopted by some Pfisters that immigrated to the United States.

== Notable people with the surname ==
- Adolf Pfister (1810–1878), German Roman Catholic priest and educator
- Albrecht Pfister (c. 1420–1466), German pioneer of printing
- Albrecht Pfister (mathematician) (born 1934), German mathematician
- Betty Haas Pfister (1921–2011), American aviator
- Charles F. Pfister (1859–1927), American tannery magnate, bank financier and philanthropist
- Christian Pfister (born 1944), Swiss historian
- Christian Pfister (1857–1933), French historian
- Cody Pfister (born 1990), American mixed martial artist
- Daniel Pfister (born 1986), Austrian luger
- Dan Pfister (1936–2020), American baseball player
- Elise Pfister (1886–1944), Swiss theologian and cleric
- Enrico Pfister (born 1982), Austrian football player
- Enrico Pfister (curler) (born 1991), Swiss-Filipino curler
- Ernst Pfister (1947–2022), German politician
- George Pfister (1918–1997), American baseball player and executive
- Gerhard Pfister (born 1962), Swiss politician
- Hank Pfister (born 1953), American tennis player
- Hanspeter Pfister (born 1964), Swiss computer scientist
- Jacques Pfister (1903–1968), French racing cyclist
- Lauren Pfister (born 1951), American theologian
- LeRoy Pfister (1925–2002), American politician from Nebraska
- Manuel Pfister (born 1988), Austrian luger
- Marc Pfister (born 1989), Swiss-Filipino curler
- Marcus Pfister (born 1960), Swiss author and illustrator
- Martin Pfister (born 1963), Swiss politician
- Max Pfister (1932–2017), Swiss Romance studies scholar and linguist
- Nadia Pfister (born 1995), Swiss squash player
- Olivier Pfister, American physicist and university professor
- Oskar Pfister (1873–1956), Swiss Lutheran minister and psychoanalyst
- Otto Pfister (born 1937), German football manager
- Phil Pfister (born 1971), American strongman
- René Pfister (born 1943), Swiss racewalker
- Rita Pfister (born 1952), Swiss athlete
- Rudolf Pfister (1909–2000), Swiss pastor and academic
- Stephan Pfister (born 1956), Swiss curling player and coach
- Wally Pfister (born 1961), American cinematographer and director
- Willy Pfister (1928–2015), Swiss ice hockey player

== See also ==
- Pfister (disambiguation)
- Fister (disambiguation) § People
- Feaster (surname)
- Pfitzer (surname)
