= Cölln =

Former city constituting contemporary Berlin's Spree Island and Neuköllner Bezirk

Coordinates: 52°31′02″N 13°24′10″E

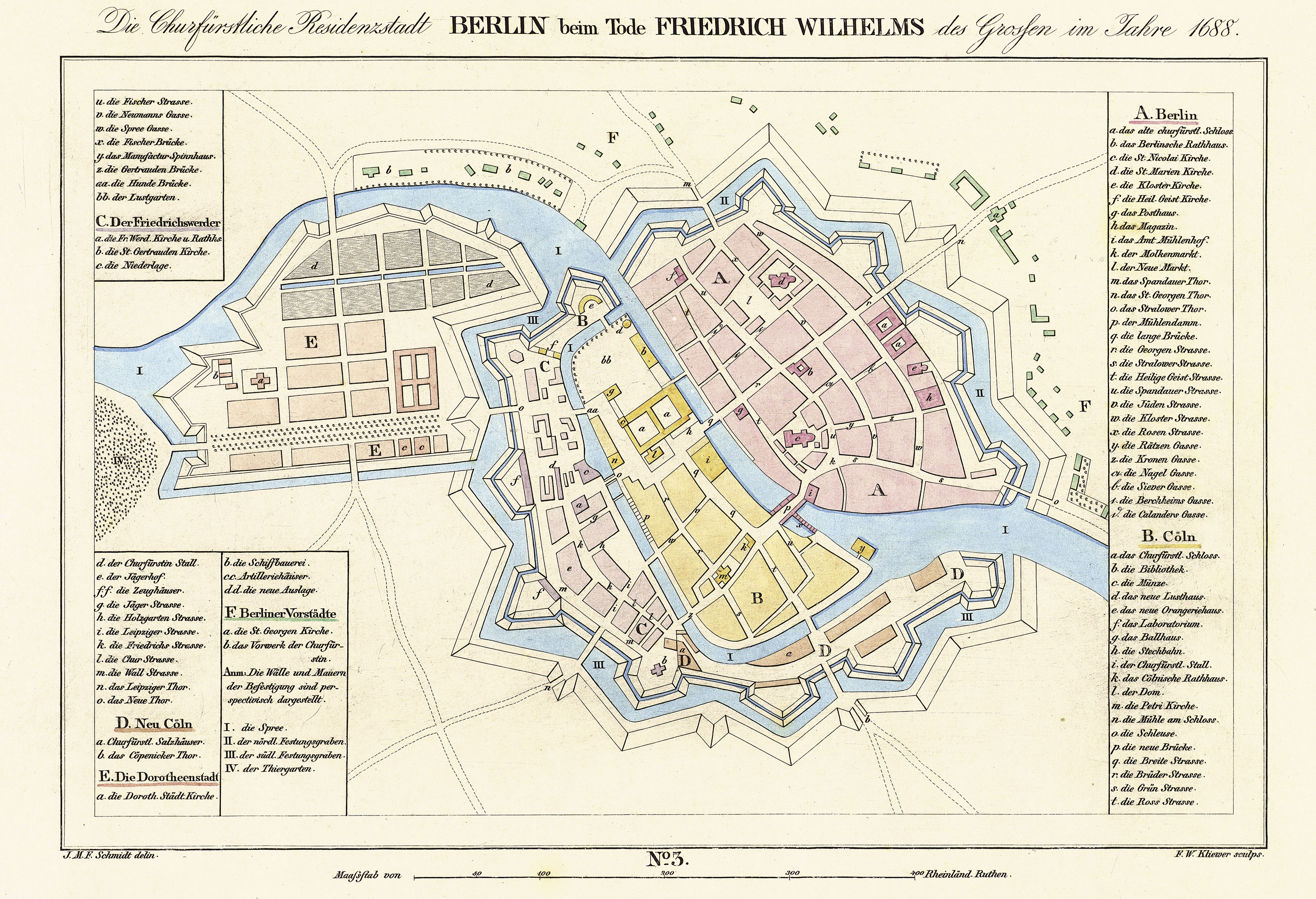
A 1686 map of Berlin and neighboring cities with Cölln labelled "B" and highlighted in yellow

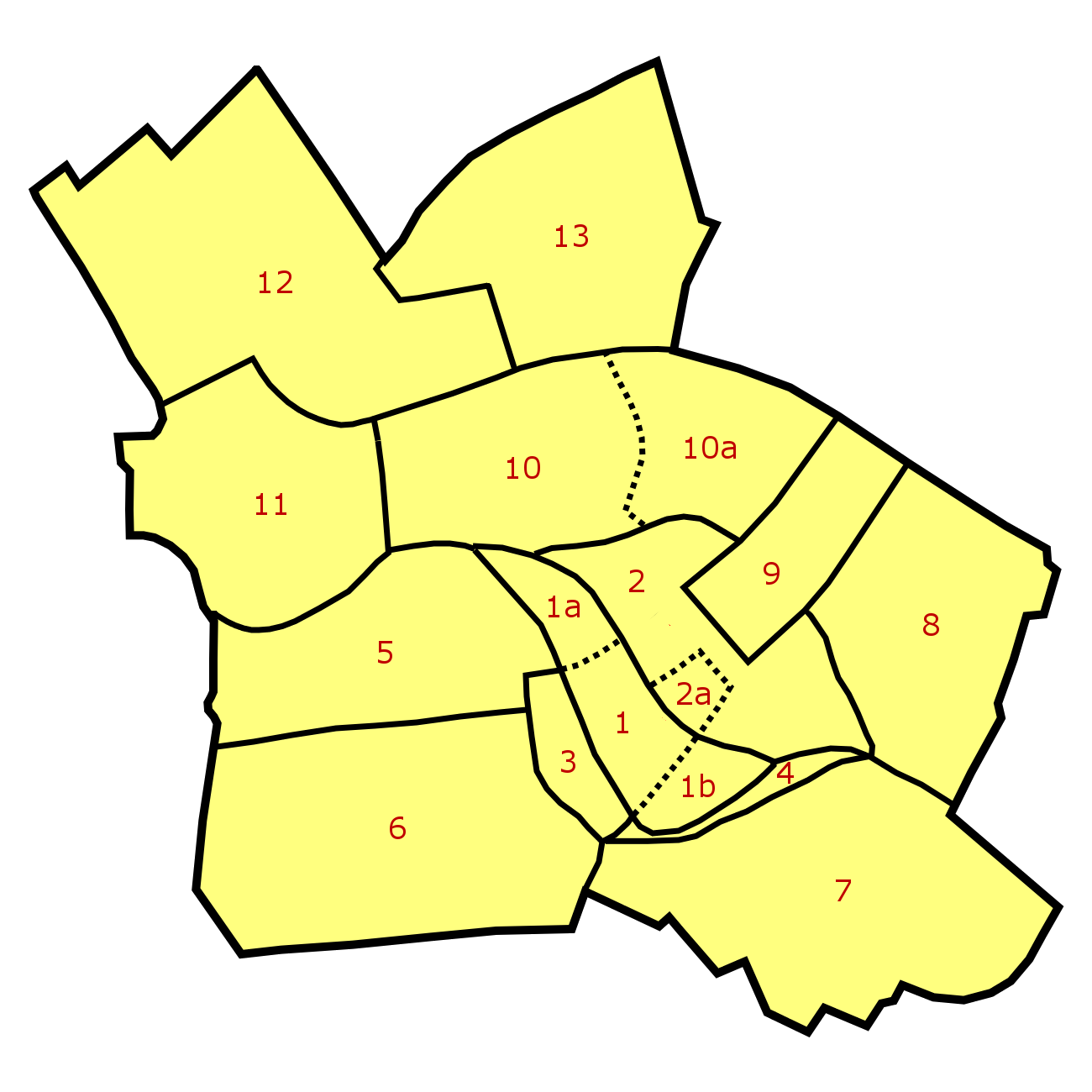
Quarters of Berlin-Mitte: Cölln (1); Museum Island (1a); Fisher Island (1b); Alt-Berlin (2); Nikolaiviertel (2a); Friedrichswerder (3); Neukölln am Wasser (4); Dorotheenstadt (5); Friedrichstadt (6); Luisenstadt (7); Stralauer Vorstadt (8); Alexanderplatz (9); Spandauer Vorstadt (10); Scheunenviertel (10a); Friedrich-Wilhelm-Stadt (11); Oranienburger Vorstadt (12); Rosenthaler Vorstadt (13)

Cölln (German pronunciation: [ˈkœln]) was the twin city of Old Berlin (Alt-Berlin) from the 13th century to the 18th century. Cölln was located on the Fisher Island section of Spree Island, opposite Altberlin on the western bank of the River Spree, until the cities were merged by Frederick I of Prussia to form Berlin in 1710. Today, the former site of Cölln is the historic core of the modern Berlin-Mitte locality of the Mitte borough in central Berlin.

== History ==
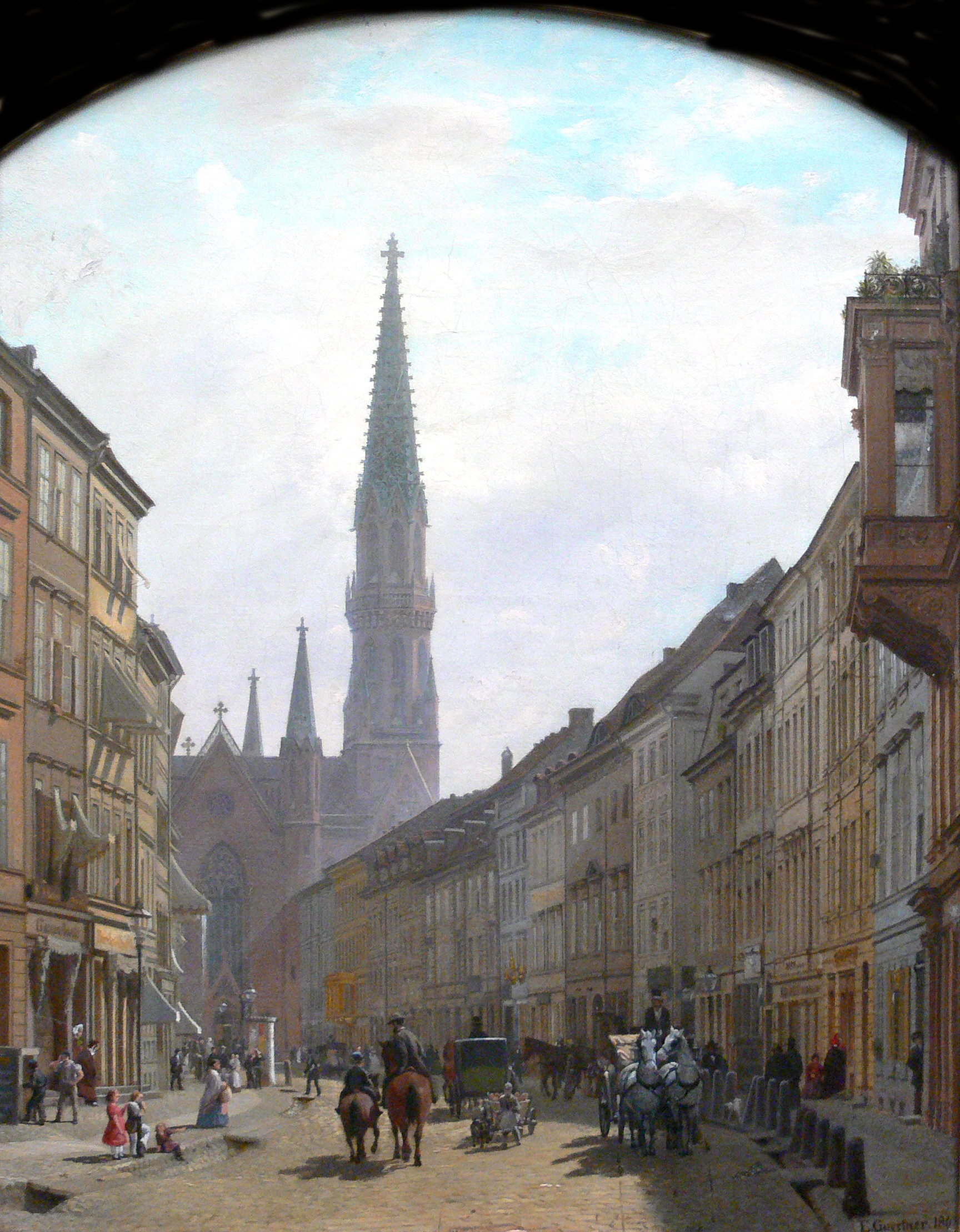
Cölln: Brüderstraße and St. Peter in the 19th century, by Eduard Gaertner

Cölln is first mentioned in a 1237 deed, denoting a priest Symeon of Cölln's (Symeon de Colonia) Saint Peter's Church as a witness. This date is commonly regarded as the origin of Berlin, though Altberlin on the eastern bank of the Spree river was not mentioned before 1244 and parts of modern Greater Berlin, such as Spandau and Köpenick, are even older.

Cölln and Altberlin were separated only by the river Spree, linked by the Mühlendamm causeway, hence there was a close connection right from the start. Since the trade route from Magdeburg to Frankfurt (Oder) crosses the twin town and the inland water-transportation routes also passed through it, Cölln-Berlin quickly came to prosperity. A second crossing, the Lange Brücke (Long Bridge), today the Rathausbrücke (Town Hall Bridge) was erected across the Spree in 1307 with a common town hall in the middle of it.

The common policy of Berlin and Cölln led 1307 to a first alliance with other towns (Brandenburg an der Havel, Frankfurt (Oder) and Salzwedel) in the March to defend their rights against the sovereign. The Elector Frederick II Irontooth of Brandenburg ended the autonomy of Cölln/Berlin and declared the twin town to his residence in 1451. In 1710 the twin cities Cölln and old Berlin merged by the order of King Frederick I to form the capital of Prussia. As Altberlin was twice as big as Cölln at that time, the merged city was named Berlin.

The name of Cölln survives in Berlin's southeastern quarter Neukölln ("New Cölln"), formerly Rixdorf, and the homonymous borough of Neukölln, which are geographically distinct from the historical Neu-Cölln, a southern extension of Cölln, originally also called Neu-Cölln am Wasser (Neu-Cölln by the water). As Neu-Kölln, it later became a small district of Berlin until the 1920 Greater Berlin Act. The Köllnischer Park and the street Am Köllnischen Park are both located in the former territory of Neu-Cölln. The Bärenzwinger enclosure situated in the park was until 2015 home to three brown bears—the bear is the heraldic animal of the city of Berlin— representing the cradle of the city.

== Places of interest ==
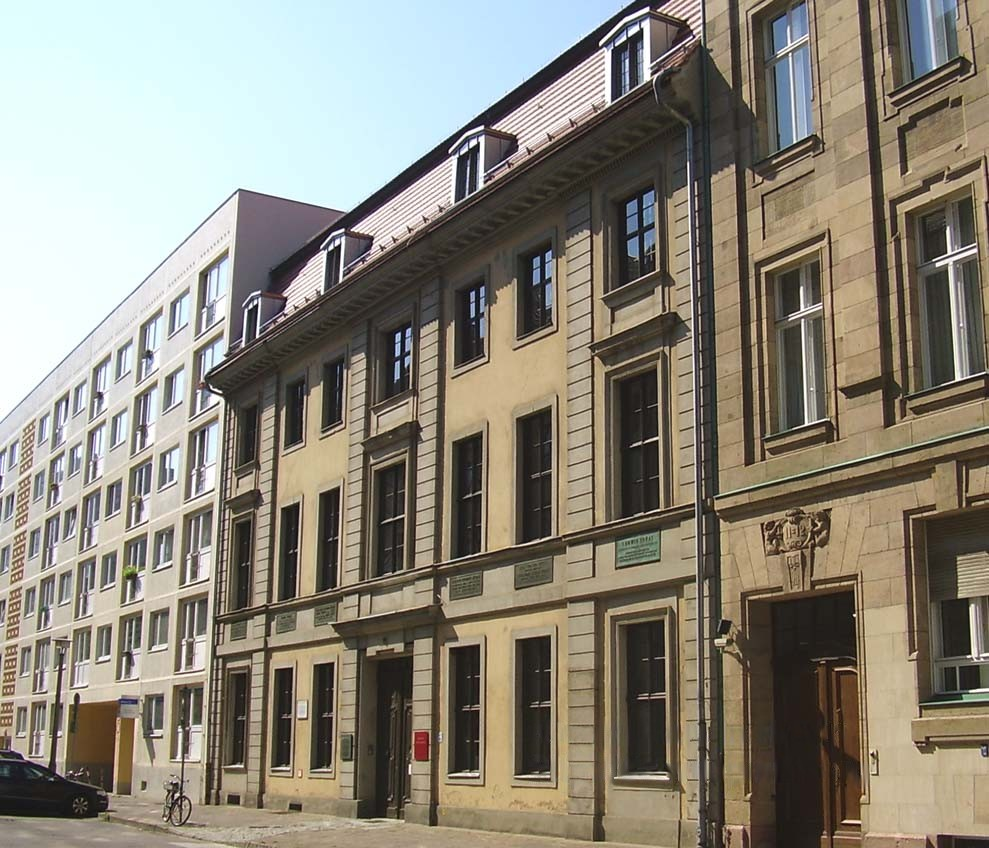
Nicolaihaus

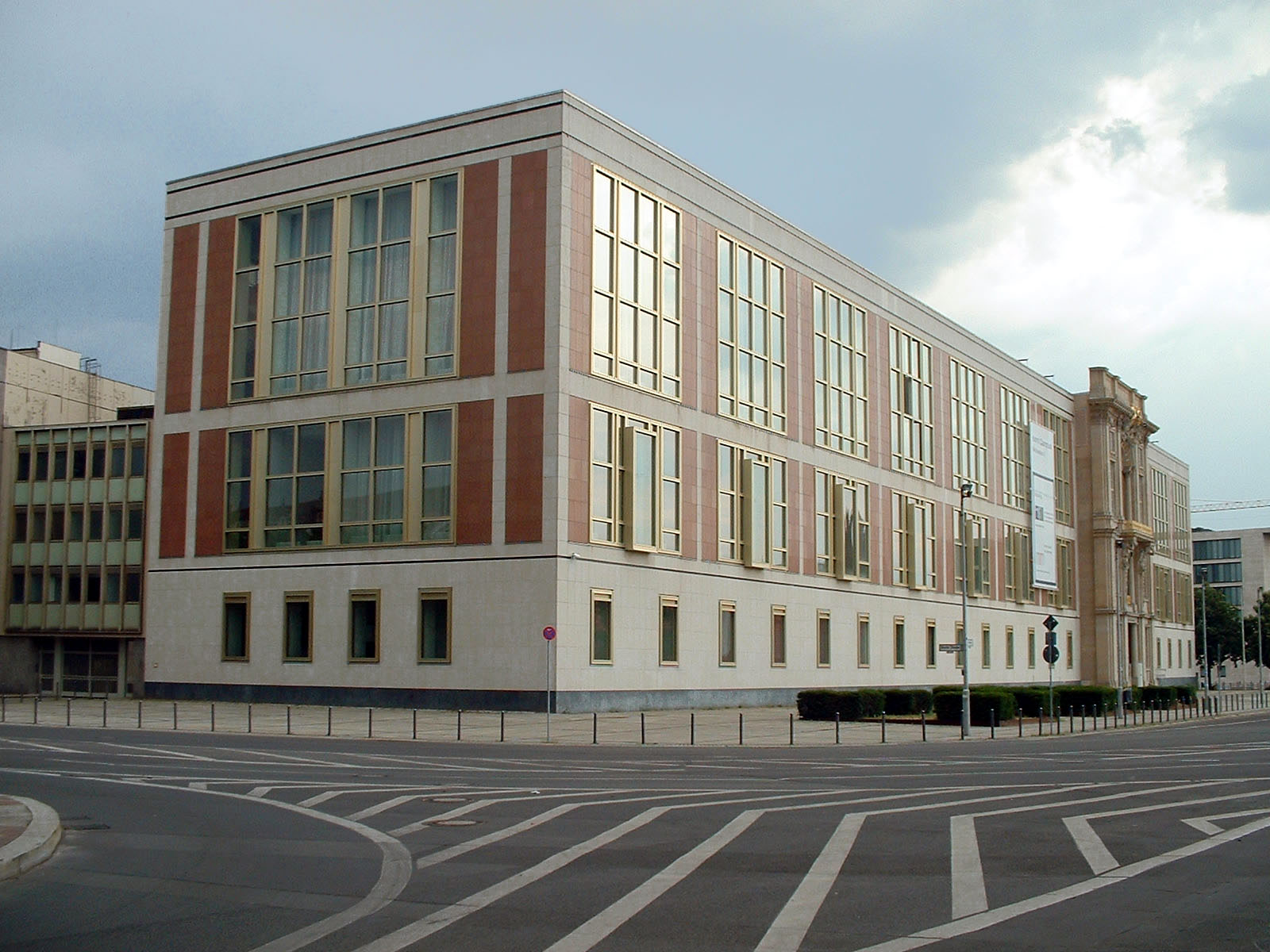
Staatsrat building

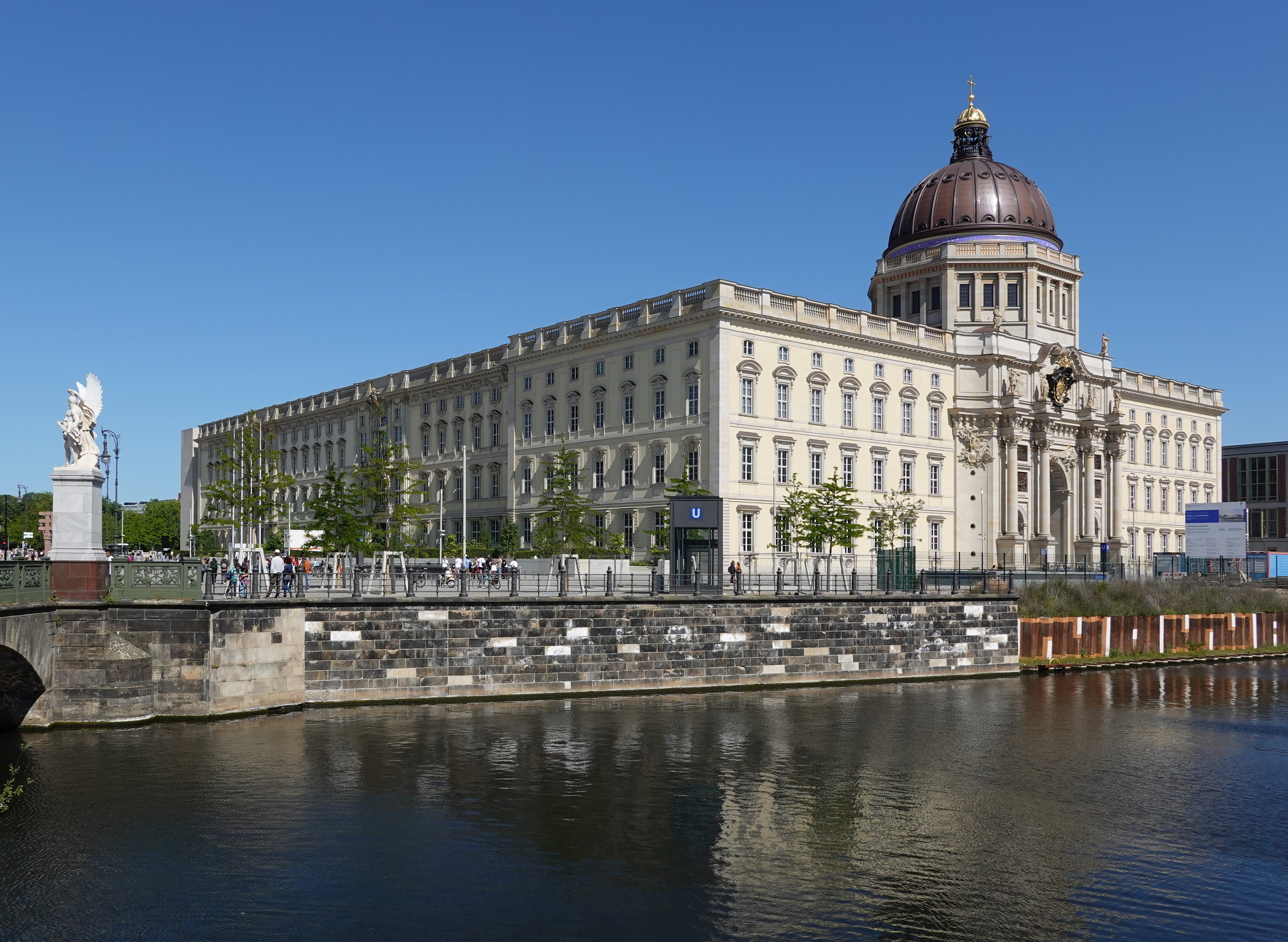
City Palace

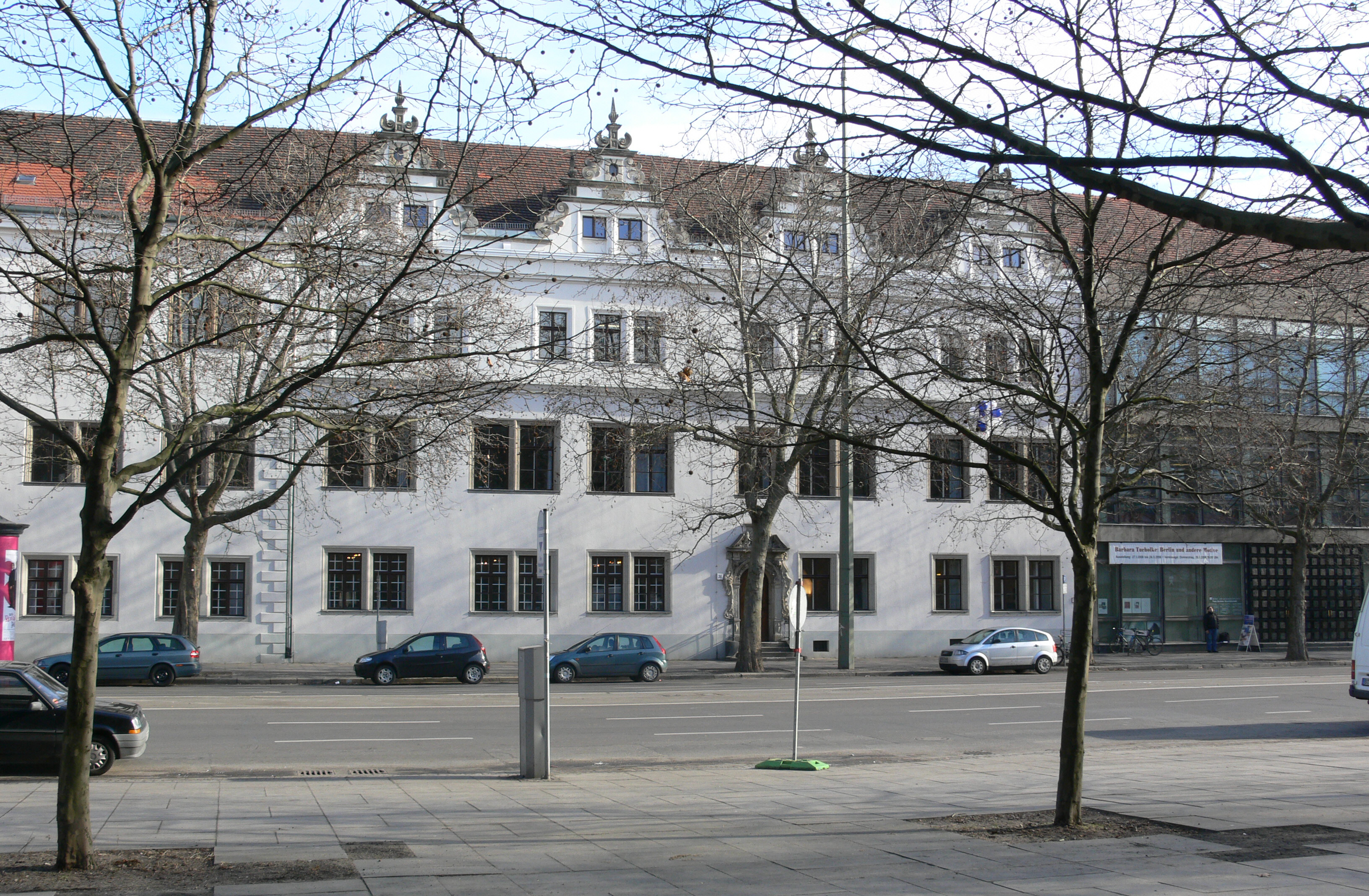
Ribbeckhaus

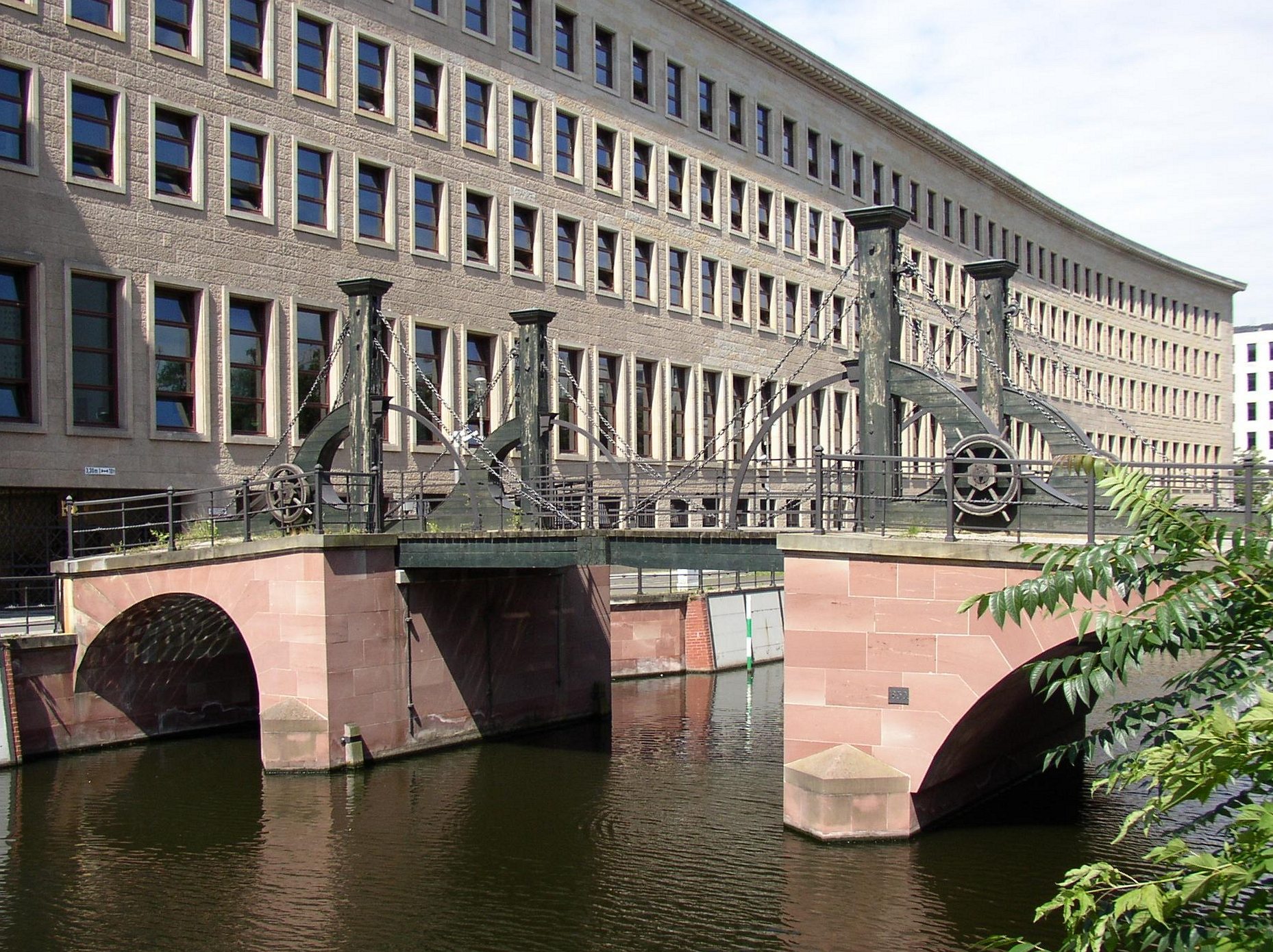
Jungfernbrücke

Cölln's centre the Saint Peter's Church, originally built about 1230 and reconstructed several times over the centuries, had been badly damaged by air raids and the Battle of Berlin in 1945. It was finally demolished in 1964. The church bore its name because many of Cölln's inhabitants depended on fishing. Today only the name of the Petriplatz square marks the site. From here the Brüderstraße runs north, named after the brothers of a former Dominican monastery established in 1297. Though most of the neighbourhood was destroyed, a few Baroque houses remained:

The bookseller Christoph Friedrich Nicolai lived on Brüderstraße 13 from 1787 until his death in 1811. Today the house is still called Nicolaihaus, it was erected about 1670 and had belonged to the merchant Johann Ernst Gotzkowsky from 1747 to 1773. Nicolai had it remodeled by the mason and composer Carl Friedrich Zelter, making it a meeting-point of intellectuals influenced by the Age of Enlightenment (Aufklärung) and Romanticism movement. In 1786 Honoré Mirabeau stayed here on his first trip to Berlin and so did the architect Karl Friedrich Schinkel, the sculptor Johann Gottfried Schadow, the printmaker Daniel Chodowiecki as well as the poet Theodor Körner in 1811. Körner's father Christian Gottfried Körner lived here as a Prussian Privy councillor from 1815 to 1828.

On Brüderstraße 10 stands the Galgenhaus (Gallows House), built about 1688. According to legend, a maidservant was hanged right in front of the house in 1735, being falsely accused of stealing a silver spoon. From 1742 on the building belonged to the early statistician Johann Peter Süßmilch, at this time provost of the Saint Peter's Church. The neighbouring building, built in 1905, is home of the Berlin representation of the Federal State of Saxony.

Nearby the Sperlingsgasse branches off, where the novelist Wilhelm Raabe lived from 1854 to 1856 and published his popular work Die Chronik der Sperlingsgasse. The small alley, at this time the Spreegasse, was renamed in 1931 on occasion of the author's hundredth anniversary. All former buildings on this street were demolished about 1960.

The northern part of the Brüderstraße today is covered by the 1964 building of the former Staatsrat of the German Democratic Republic. The façade at the Schloßplatz square includes the preserved portal No. IV of the Hohenzollern City Palace, where Karl Liebknecht on 9 November 1918 declared a free socialist republic of Germany. After German reunification the building served as the Chancellery from 1999 to 2001. Today it houses the European School of Management and Technology and the Hertie School of Governance. The area north of the Schloßplatz is the site of the historic City Palace. In accordance with a 2002 resolution by the federal Bundestag parliament, the City Palace was rebuilt.

Parallel to the Brüderstraße runs the Breite Straße (Broad Street), Cölln's main street. At the corner of the Schloßplatz are the buildings of the Old and the New Marstall riding stables of the Electors of Brandenburg, built in 1670 and 1901. Today the New Marstall is a seat of the Hanns Eisler Conservatory. On neighbouring Breite Straße 35 is the late Renaissance Ribbeckhaus from 1624, one of Berlin's oldest preserved residential buildings, which since 1920 houses the Central and Regional Library.

Three historic bridges connect Cölln with the 17th century extension of Friedrichswerder on the western bank of the Spree river: the Schleusenbrücke (Sluice Bridge) at the Schloßplatz, a steel construction erected in 1916, the Gertraudenbrücke with the statue of Saint Gertrude of Nivelles by the sculptor Rudolf Siemering from 1896 and the small Jungfernbrücke (Virgin's Bridge) built in 1798, Berlin's oldest and the only bascule bridge of the city.

== See also ==
- History of Berlin
