= Pister =

Pister is a surname of German origin. It is an occupational surname derived from the Middle High German word phister, meaning baker, which is based on the Latin word for baker, pistor.

The name later evolved into the more common surname Pfister via the High German consonant shift that transformed the "p" into "pf".

== Notable people with the name ==
- Hermann Pister (1885–1948), German war criminal, SS-Oberführer & commandant of Buchenwald concentration camp
- Karl S. Pister (1925–2022), American academic in engineering
- Kristofer Pister, American university professor of electrical engineering and computer sciences
- Phil Pister (1929–2023), American fishery biologist
- Thierry Pister (born 1965), Belgian football player and manager

== See also ==
- Bresler–Pister yield criterion, function devised to predict the strength of concrete under multiaxial stress states
