= Ocratia gens =

The Ocratia gens was an ancient Roman family. At least one member of this family, a quaestor named Titus Ocratius Valerianus, achieved senatorial rank.

== Origin ==
According to the philologist George Davis Chase, the name Ocratius may etymologically connect to the cognomina Ocra, Ocrea, and Oceratus.

== Members ==
This list includes abbreviated praenomina. For an explanation of this practice, see filiation.

- Aulus Ocratius Alex(ander?) M. l, a freedman mentioned on an inscription found near Capua.
- Gaius Ocratius C. f, mentioned on an inscription from Venafrum.
- Gaius Ocratius Lacon, composed a limestone votive inscription propitiating Jupiter Optimus Maximus, Epona, and the Genius loci. The text, which is dated to 187 CE, was uncovered in Doclea.
- Lucius Ocratius, mentioned as the father of an individual named Rutilia on an inscription from Antium.
- Lucius Ocratius, mentioned on an inscription from Volubilis dedicated to him posthumously by his spouse Julia Suavilla. He supposedly lived for thirty years, five months, and fifteen days. According to the historian Leonhard Curchin, it is possible that the phrase "Sena natus"—which appears on the inscription—may indicate that his family originated from Siena in Etruria.
- Lucius Ocratius Corinthus, husband of Ocratia Silvana.
- Lucius Ocratius Corinthus, mentioned on a funerary inscription from Luceria. He was supposedly the son of Ocratia Silvana and lived for thirty years and eleven days.
- Lucius Ocratius Saturnius, a Roman businessman. He is mentioned on an inscription from the year 154 CE, in which he is stated to have a partnership with two individuals named Cassius Apolaustus and Cassius Art[—]. It is likely that he is related to Ocratius Modestus, who also held a business relationship with Apolaustus. Saturnius may have fulfilled a similar role in the patronship to that of Modestus.
- Marcus Ocratius, mentioned on an inscription from Anazarbus written in the Ancient Greek language.
- Marcus Ocratius Longinus, mentioned on the same Ancient Greek inscription from Anazarbus as the aforementioned Marcus Ocratius.
- Marcus Ocratius M. l, a freedman and a pistor mentioned on a late 2nd-century CE inscription discovered near Capua.
- Ocra(tia) Anto[nian]a, mentioned on an inscription from Volubilis.
- (O)cratia C. (f), mentioned on an inscription from Campania.
- Ocratia C.f. Secunda, mentioned in an Ancient Greek inscription from Pepouza.
- Ocratia Ɔ. l. Dioclia, mentioned on an inscription from Caserta.
- Ocratia Fausta, a freedwomen of an individual named Decimus.
- Ocratia Felicula, mentioned on an inscription from Fundi.
- Ocratia L. f, mentioned on an inscription from Volubilis.
- Ocratia P. f, mentioned on an inscription from Narbo.
- Ocratia Secunda, mentioned on an inscription from Bagacum dedicated by an individual named Marcus Pompeius Victor, who was a quaestor and her spouse.
- Ocratia Secunda, mentioned on the same Ancient Greek inscription from Anazarbus as the aforementioned Marcus Ocratius.
- Ocratia Silvana, the wife of Lucius Ocratius Corinthus. She is also mentioned on the same inscription as her son Ocratius Corinthus.
- Ocratia (Sisenia?), mentioned on an inscription dating to the first two centuries CE. The artifact was discovered in Hispania Citerior near modern Santanyí. Her cognomen is alternatively rendered as Sicina by the Corpus Inscriptionum Latinarum.
- Ocratia T. l. Athenais, mentioned on an inscription from Rome.
- Ocratius, mentioned on an inscription from Brixia.
- [O]cratius, mentioned on an inscription from Otricoli.
- Ocratius, mentioned on an inscription from Volubilis. This inscription was erected by Sassius Pudens, the husband of a flaminica named Ocratiana, who was the daughter of Ocratius. It is likely that Ocratiana served as flaminica during the 1st-century CE, as Sassius Pudens is mentioned on another inscription that is dated to the same time frame.
- Ocratius Cresces, mentioned on an Ancient Greek inscription from Attica.
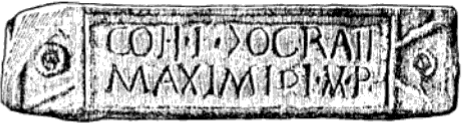
  Stone of Ocratius Maximus.
- Ocratius Fronto, mentioned on an inscription from Massa d'Albe.
- Ocratius Maximus, mentioned on an inscription from Deva. He was a Roman military officer belonging to the first cohort of his respective legion. It is possible that the original inscription was once placed within a city wall.
- Ocratius Modestus, a Roman businessman specializing in the oil and amphorae trade. In 145 CE, he partnered formed a partnership with an individual named Vinisius Aelius Aelianus. Later, in 154 CE, he is attested in another partnership with Cassius Apolaustus and Cassius Art[—]. According to the classicist Wim Broekaert, since Aelianus and Apolaustus are both associated with amphorae production in other inscriptions, it is likely that Modestus primarily managed the distribution of goods. It is likely that he is related to Ocratius Saturnius, who may have assumed his role in partnership with the two Cassi. Modestus and his partnership with Apolaustus are attested in another inscription, which—according to Broekaert—may indicate that any potential replacement by Saturnius must have only lasted for a brief period of time.
- Ocratius T. f, mentioned on an inscription from Peltuinum.
- Publius Ocratius, mentioned on an inscription uncovered near Capua.
- Publius Ocra(tius), mentioned on an inscription uncovered in Delos. It is unclear whether this individual resided on Delos.
- Quintus Ocratius Cissus, a freedman mentioned on an inscription from Rome.
- Quintus Ocratius Titianus, mentioned on an inscription from Volubilis. He was supposedly the brother of the senator Titus Ocratius Valerianus.
- Sextus Ocratius Publicanus, mentioned on an Ancient Greek inscription from Claros. He is likely that the son of Sextus Ocratius Sacerdos, who is mentioned in the same inscription.
- Sextus Ocratius Sacerdos, mentioned on the same inscription as his son Ocratius Publicanus.
- Titus Ocratius, mentioned on a funerary inscription from Rome.
- Titus Ocratius, mentioned on an inscription from Aveia.
- Titus Ocratius T. l. Sabbionis, mentioned on an inscription from Rome.
- Titus Ocratius Valerianus, mentioned on several inscriptions from Volubilis. He was supposedly a quaestor in the province of Baetica, likely around the end of the 2nd or the beginning of the 3rd century CE. Valerianus is the only known individual from Tingitana to have achieved Senatorial rank. He was also reportedly the brother of Quintus Ocratius Titianus.
