= Pfister =

Pfister may refer to:

- Pfister (firm), American plumbing fixtures company
- Pfister (surname)
- Pfister form, mathematical term for a specific polynomial
- The Pfister Hotel, Milwaukee, Wisconsin, U.S.
- Pfister & Vogel, American tannery company
- Pfisters Mühle, 1884 novel by German author Wilhelm Raabe
- The Pfister Siblings, Swiss-German comedy band

== See also ==
- Dombrowski v. Pfister (1965), United States Supreme Court case
- Fister (disambiguation)
