= Johannes Pistorius =

Johannes Pistorius may refer to:

- Jan de Bakker van Woerden (1499–1525), Dutch Catholic priest who was the first to be martyred for Protestant beliefs
- Johann Pistorius the Elder (1504–1583), German Protestant minister, who participated in several religious disputations between Catholics and Protestants
- Johann Pistorius Niddanus (the Younger) (1546–1608), German controversialist and historian, son of Johann Pistorius the Elder
- Johan Pistorius (died 1722), Danish grenadier executed for witchcraft
- Johannes Pistorius (badminton) (born 1995), German badminton player
