= Pfisterer =

Pfisterer is a surname. Notable people with the surname include:

- Alban "Snoopy" Pfisterer (born 1946), Swiss drummer and keyboardist
- Herman Pfisterer (1866–1905), musician
- Maximilian Pfisterer (born 1997), German ice dancer
- Paul Eddie Pfisterer (born 1951), German music and visual artist
- Ulrich Pfisterer (born 1951), German football player
- Ulrich Pfisterer (art historian) (born 1968), art historian

== See also ==
- Pfisterer Group, German corporation
