= Feaster =

Origin
- Language: German
- Region of origin: Anglosphere, most commonly the United States

Other names
- Variant form: Pfister

Feaster is a surname.

It is an Americanized surname based on the German surname Pfister, which is derived from the Latin word pistor, meaning baker. Some families named Pfister from Germany, Austria or Switzerland took on the name Feaster after immigrating to the United States.

== Notable people with the name ==
- Allison Feaster (born 1976), American basketball player
- Bill Feaster (1904–1950), American football player
- Boobie Feaster (born 2009), American football player
- Jay Feaster (born 1962), American ice hockey executive
- Mosheim Feaster (1867–1950), American soldier
- Rob Feaster (born 1973), American basketball player
- Tavien Feaster (born 1997), American football player
- Theresa Feaster, American ice hockey coach

== See also ==
- Feaster Branch, stream Benton County, Missouri, United States of America
