= Ambrosius Pelargus =

16th-century German theologian

Ambrosius Pelargus (c. 1493 – 5 July 1561) was a German Dominican theologian. He was skilled in Latin, Greek, and Hebrew. His polemical efforts were directed principally against the Anabaptists, the Iconoclasts, and those who rejected the Mass.

Pelargus was a humanist name, from the Greek pelargon, meaning stork; his real name is given as Storch.

== Life ==
Pelargus was born at Nidda, Hesse. He entered the Dominican order probably at Freiburg, Breisgau. He attended the Diet of Worms (1540) and the Council of Trent in 1546, as theologian and procurator of the Archbishop of Trier. On 10 May 1546, he addressed the assembled priests.

When the Council was transferred to Bologna in 1547, Emperor Charles V, incensed against Pelargus because he had favoured the transfer, induced the archbishop to recall him, but the latter chose him again as his theologian in 1561. He died at Trier.

== Works ==
His works include:

- "Apologia sacrificii eucharistiae contra Oecolampadium" (Basle, 1528);
- "Hyperaspismus, seu apologiae propugnatio..." (Basle, 1529);
- "Opuscula", against Anabaptists and Iconoclasts (Freiburg, 1534);
- "Divina S. Joannis Chrysos. Liturgia, e Graeco Latine ab Ambrosio Pelargo versa et illustrata" (Worms, 1541);
- "Inter Pelargum et Erasmum epistolae" (Cologne, 1539).
