= Nidda, Hesse =

Nidda
- Town
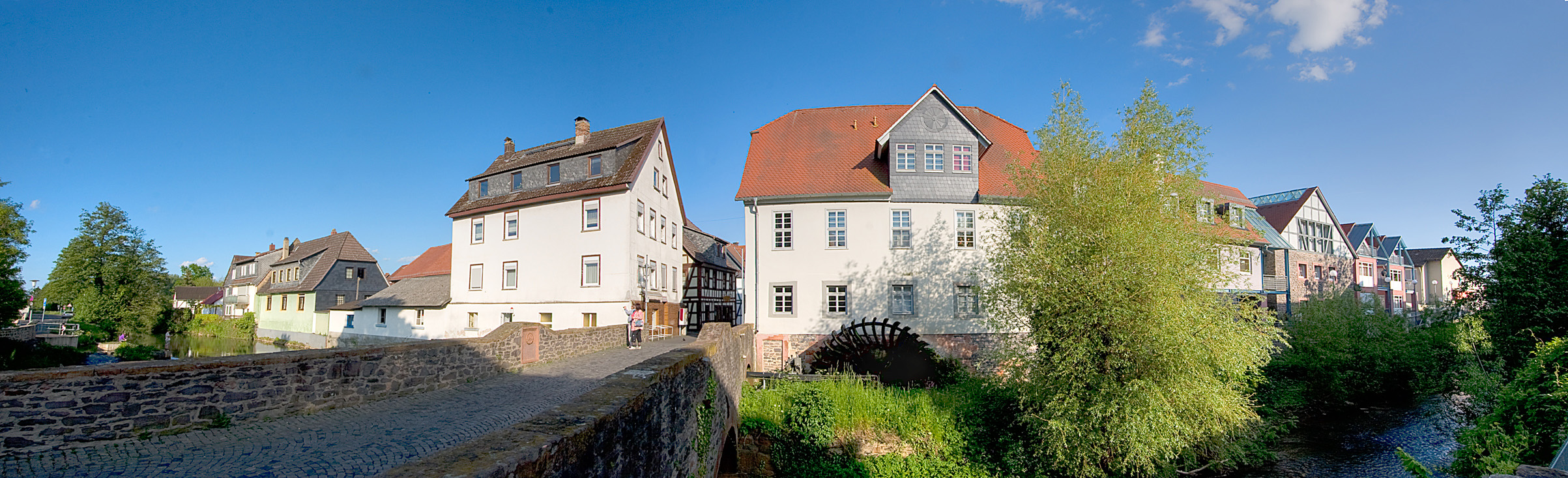

- Coat of arms

- Location of Nidda within Wetteraukreis district
- Interactive map of Nidda
- Location within Germany Location within Hesse
- Coordinates: 50°24′46″N 9°0′33″E
- Country: Germany
- State: Hesse
- Admin. region: Darmstadt
- District: Wetteraukreis
- Subdivisions: 18 districts

Government
  - Mayor (2022–28): Thorsten Eberhard (CDU)

Area
  - Total: 118.33 km^{2} (45.69 sq mi)
- Elevation: 131 m (430 ft)

Population (2025-12-31)
  - Total: 17,097
  - Density: 144.49/km^{2} (374.22/sq mi)
- Time zone: UTC+01:00 (CET)
  - Summer (DST): UTC+02:00 (CEST)
- Postal codes: 63667
- Dialling codes: 06043
- Vehicle registration: FB, BÜD
- Website: www.nidda.de

Nidda (German pronunciation: [ˈnɪda]) is a town in the Wetterau district in Hesse, Germany. It is situated on the Nidda river, approximately 40 km (25 mi) northeast of Frankfurt am Main.

== Division of the town ==
The municipality consists of the districts Unter-Widdersheim, Ober-Widdersheim, Borsdorf, Harb, Bad-Salzhausen, Geiß-Nidda, Ulfa, Stornfels, Eichelsdorf, Ober-Schmitten, Unter-Schmitten, Kohden, Nidda, Michelnau, Fauerbach, Wallernhausen, Schwickartshausen, Unter-Lais and Ober-Lais.

== History ==
Invited through a manifesto issued by Catherine the Great, several families from this region travelled to Russia in the late 18th century to settle in the Volga Region near Saratov. Family names Appel, Daubert, Pfaffenroth, Weitz and Scheuermann are examples of Volga Germans who helped to establish local villages, including Yagodnaya Polyana.

Nidda has a vibrant mix of people from many backgrounds, including Turkish, Russian and Pakistani. The Ahmadiyya Muslim Jamaat opened its first purpose-built mosque in Nidda in 2011.

== Mayors ==
- 2022–present - Thorsten Eberhard
- 2010–2022 Hans-Peter Seum
- 1995–2009 Lucia Puttrich
- 1989–1995 Helmut Jung
- 1961–1989 Wilhelm Eckhardt
- 1949–1961 August Ludwig Böcher
- 1910–1924 Ludwig Erk
- 1899–1910 Hermann Roth
- 1898–1899 Wilhelm Erk

== Born in Nidda ==
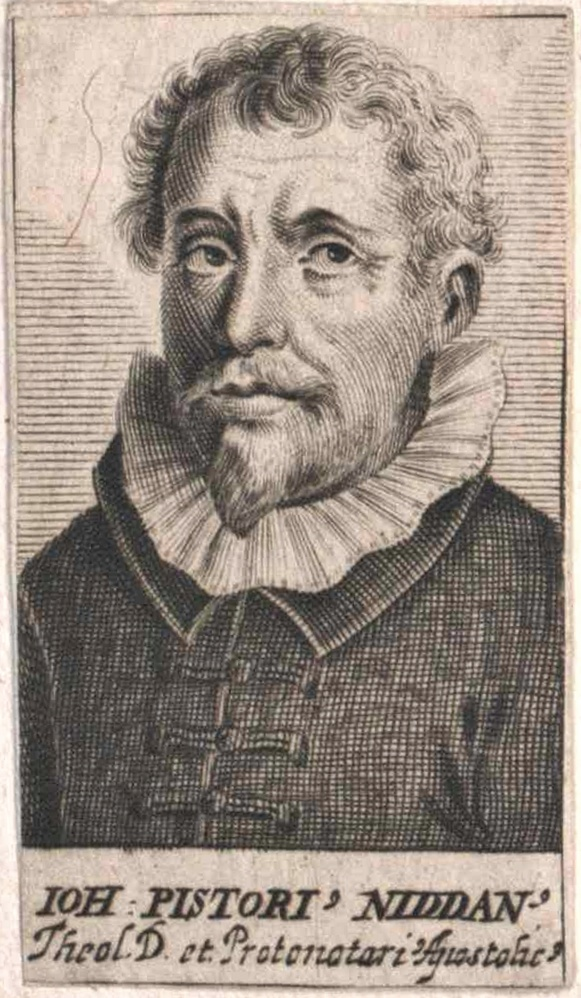
Johannes Pistorius (1600)

- Ambrosius Pelargus (c. 1493 / 94–1561), theologian
- Johann Pistorius the Elder (Niddanus) (1504–1583), reformer and superintendent
- Johann Pistorius (Niddanus) (1546–1608), physician, historian and theologian
- Prince Charles William of Hesse-Darmstadt (1693–1707), Prince of Hesse-Darmstadt, obrist
- Salome Kammer (born 1959), actress, vocalist, singer and cellist
