= The Birdsong Papers =

1896 novel by Wilhelm Raabe

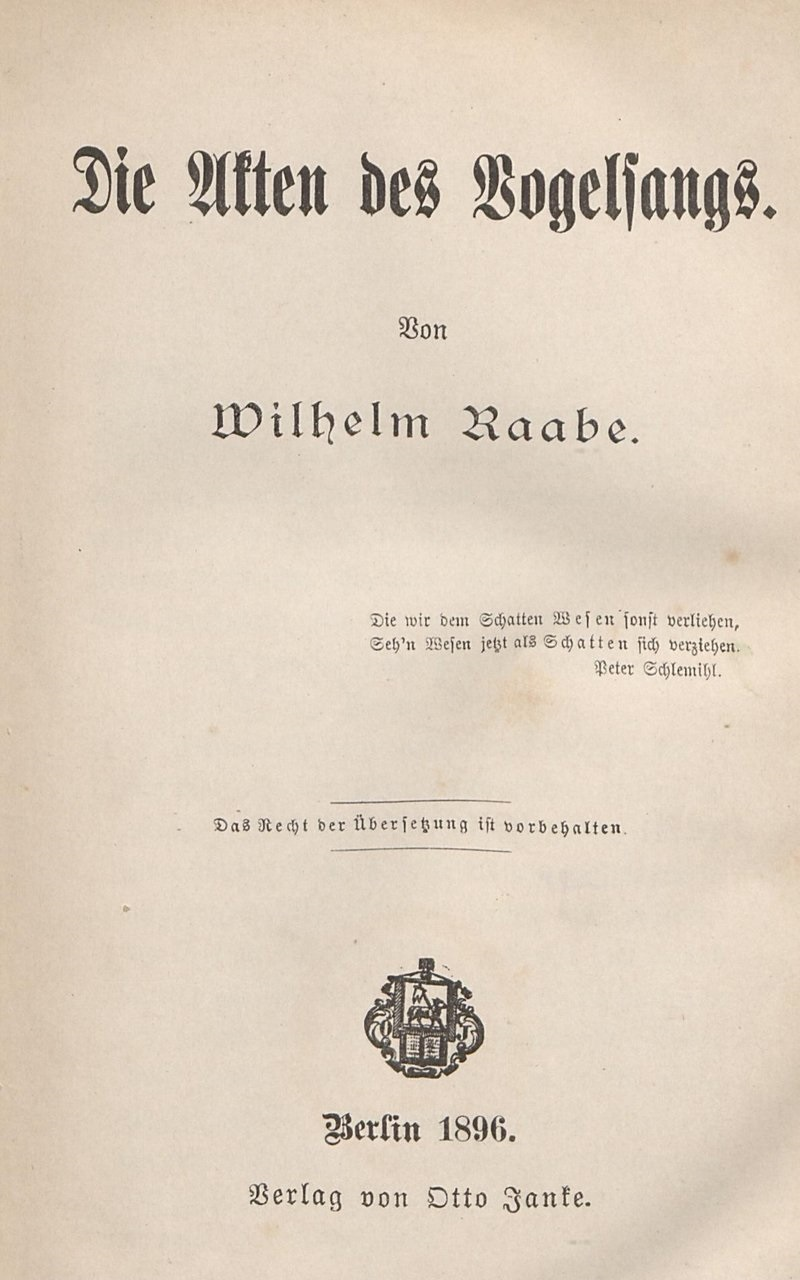
- Author: Wilhelm Raabe
- Original title: Die Akten des Vogelsangs
- Translator: Michael Ritterson
- Language: German
- Publisher: Otto Janke
- Publication date: 1896
- Publication place: Germany
- English publication date: 2013
- Pages: 320

The Birdsong Papers (German: Die Akten des Vogelsangs) is a novel by the German writer Wilhelm Raabe. It is about a civil servant who writes down the story of a love affair between a boy and girl he knew in his youth in the suburb of Vogelsang.

Published by Otto Janke in Berlin in 1896, it was one of Raabe's last works. It is sometimes grouped with Alte Nester (1879) and Stopfkuchen (1891) as the Braunschweig Trilogy.

An English translation of The Birdsong Papers by Michael Ritterson was published in 2013.
