= Pfisters Mühle =

1884 novel by Wilhelm Raabe

Pfisters Mühle: Ein Sommerferienheft (English: Pfister's Mill: Notes From a Summer Vacation) is an 1884 novel by German author Wilhelm Raabe. A tale of economic change and environmental destruction, the story is told from the first person perspective of Ebert Pfister, who recounts how the arrival of the factory Krickerode destroyed the stream on which the mill once stood.

== Plot Description ==
Ebert, short for Dr. Eberhard Pfister, spends summer vacation together with his 19-year-old wife Emmy “on magical land and ground" ("auf verzaubertem Grund und Boden") in the defunct mill of his deceased father Bertram Gottlieb Pfister, once host “of Pfister’s enjoyment gardens”.

During the summer stay, Ebert shares his memories of the mill's history. Ebert lost his mother at a young age and cannot remember her. He was raised by the housemaid Christine, while his father ensured Ebert was taught Latin by a student of philosophy –– later Doctor of Chemistry –– Adam August Asche. Asche is the son of a textile dyer and a friend of the miller in his lifetime. Next to his mill, Pfister ran a flourishing local getaway. Summer guests from the nearby town would sit under the old chestnut trees. One of the guests, school board director Dr. Pottgiesser, a good friend of the host, accepts the enlightened Ebert into his high school. Periods of study in Berlin, Jena and Heidelberg are to follow, all financed by Ebert's father.

Not far from the mill, the unsuccessful playwright, lyricist, and drunkard Dr. Felix Lippoldes lived a lamentable existence with his daughter Albertine. Invited on Christmas Eve to the “pungent" ("verstänkerte") mill, the poet climbs on the Christmas table and announces “with sinister pathos" ("mit finsterm Pathos"):

“The hour will come – don’t think, it is far- " ("Einst kommt die Stunde – denkt nicht, sie sei ferne")

The Christmas fest is disrupted by the awful smell of the once clear mill water, now “slimy and greasy" ("Schleim und Schmiere"). Ebert requests his friend Asche to conduct a chemical analysis of the water. The chemist eagerly gets to work and finds “mushroom masses covered with algae" ("Pilzmassen mit Algen überzogen"), “saprophyte" ("Fäulnisbewohner"), and beggiatoa alba. The latter stems from “the outlets of the sugar factory" ("den Ausflüssen der Zuckerfabriken"). On the second day of Christmas, the friends research the downfall of Pfister’s Mill. Their expedition follows the creek up from the Mill all the way to the beet factory at Krickerode. The factory there produced, even on holidays, “black smoke clouds" ("schwarze Rauchwolken") and beet sugar; releasing its waste sludge into the mill creek. A lawsuit is filed. Although the lawyer Dr. Riechei wins the court case against the operator of Krickerode Sugar Factory thanks to Dr. Asche's scholarly report, the miller is not able to overcome the devastation of his once healthy little world. He dies from the awful-smelling creek. Albertine's father, the “brilliant playwright" ("geniale Dramatiker") Felix Lippoldes was previously found drowned in the mill creek. Albertine, who could no longer help her father, cared for the miller Pfister until his end.

The hours of the mill are numbered. Gentlemen come to the tear down of the old buildings from the city, “with their yardsticks and notebooks" ("mit ihren Maßstäben und Notizbüchern"). “Wheelbarrows and shovels and axes" ("Schubkarren und Schaufeln und Hacken") are unloaded from the wagon. “The Architect of the big new factory company" ("Der Architekt der neuen großen Fabrikgesellschaft") spreads out “his plans in the dreary restaurant" ("öden Gaststube seine Planrollen"). On the location of Pfister’s mill, a “lucrative, modern company" ("lukrativeres, zeitgemäßeres Unternehmen") will be built. Dr. Asche, who had for a while cast an eye on Albertine, marries the poet's daughter and enters “the business of spoiling water" ("das wasserverderbende Geschäft"): he founds a large industrial factory on the Spandau banks of the Spree. On his death bed, miller Pfister forgave his old friend Asche, who took embraced the new world of textiles and fashion, and added humbly: “Then the loving God must see it as the best" ("Dann wird es wohl der liebe Gott fürs beste halten").

In Berlin, Emmy and Albertine have children. Occasionally, the two mothers sit together directly next to the loud “chemical laundry" ("chemischen Waschanstalt"), whose wastewater is “forcibly fouling" ("nach Kräften verunreinigen") the Spree.

== Editions ==
- Raabe, Wilhelm. Pfisters Mühle. Sämtliche Werke. Ed. Karl Hoppe. Vol. 16. Göttingen, 1957.
