= Fister (disambiguation) =

Fister a village in Hjelmeland municipality in Rogaland county, Norway.

Fister also may refer to:

== People ==
- Barbara Fister (born 1954), an American author, blogger, and librarian
- Carl Fister, a former Austrian-American soccer center forward
- Doug Fister (born 1984), an American professional baseball pitcher
- Edward Fister (1911-2003), an American pioneer in electrical engineering
- Peter Fister, a politician of the late 1700s in Slovenia, Holy Roman Empire

== Places ==
- Fister Church, a church in Hjelmeland municipality in Rogaland county, Norway
- Fister Municipality, a former municipality in Rogaland county, Norway

== Other ==
- FiSTer, a forward observer in the U.S. military

== See also ==
- Pfister (disambiguation)
