= The Chronicle of Sparrow Lane =

1857 novel by Wilhelm Raabe

- Author: Wilhelm Raabe
- Original title: Die Chronik der Sperlingsgasse
- Illustrator: Ernst Bosch
- Language: German
- Genre: Novel
- Set in: Berlin
- Publication date: 1857
- Publication place: Germany
- Media type: Print

The Chronicle of Sparrow Lane (German: Die Chronik der Sperlingsgasse) is an 1857 novel by German writer Wilhelm Raabe. Raabe began writing it in November 1854 and completed it two years later, in May 1856. At this time he lived on the former Spree Street (Spreestraße) in central Berlin, from where he wrote the novel and which he used as the model for the novel's Sparrow Lane (Sperlingsgasse). In 1931 the street was accordingly renamed Sparrow Lane in honor of Raabe.

It is Raabe's first novel, although it was published under the pseudonym Jacob Corvinus. The "chronicle" itself takes place almost contemporaneously with its composition, beginning in November 1854 and taking place over the following half year. It is divided into 21 journal-type entries.

== Plot summary ==
The fictional writer and narrator of the chronicle is old Johannes Wacholder. He lives in a small attic room observing and chronicling the happenings in the narrow street of the novel's title. Sparrow Lane is located in Berlin, but the city itself is largely undescribed, with the narrator giving his attention to the lives of the street's inhabitants. Such inhabitants included his childhood friend, the painter Franz Ralff, whose daughter Elise is adopted by Wachholder after her parents' deaths. The girl later marries Gustav Berg, a painter who turns out to be a distant cousin of hers. There is the tale of Wimmer, a journalist who had to move to Munich because of his political convictions—his humorous letters to Wachholder are included in the Chronicle.

In spite of its ominously dark opening line, "These are actually rather evil times!", the novel proceeds in a mostly serene, at times even idyllic vein. By telling the stories of ordinary people’s lives in an ordinary street, Raabe paints a contemporary picture of social and political affairs in 1850s Germany.

== Structure and style ==
The novel's structure is complex, consisting of several parallel storylines interspersed with flashbacks of the past, memories and biographical details of various people, as well as digressions and inserted episodes, which are not always chronological. They are all held together and presented by the narrator as "Sparrow Lane's picture book". The novel's style anticipates Raabe's later major works.
