= Pistorius =

Pistorius is a surname. It is an occupational surname derived from the Latin word pistor (meaning miller or baker) and further Latinised by the suffix -ius. Pistor also appears as a surname.

The name corresponds in meaning to the Dutch surname Bakker and the German surnames Becker and Pfister.

== Notable people with the surname ==
=== Pistorius ===
- Ashlee Pistorius (born 1985), American soccer player
- Boris Pistorius (born 1960), German politician
- Calie Pistorius (born 1958), South African electrical engineer
- Caren Pistorius (born 1990), New Zealand actress
- Charlotte Pistorius (1777–1850), German poet
- Christian Pistorius (1763/65–1823), German writer and translator
- Eduard Pistorius (1796–1862), German artist
- Hermann Andreas Pistorius (1730–1798), German theologian and philosopher
- Johannes Pistorius (disambiguation), several people
- Martin Pistorius (born 1975), South African web designer and author
- Micki Pistorius (born 1961), South African forensic psychologist and author
- Oscar Pistorius (born 1986), South African double-amputee athlete and convicted murderer
- Stephen Pistorius, South African-Canadian academic and medical physicist
- Ursula Pistorius (1933–2015), German politician

=== Pistor ===
- Johann Jakob Pistor (1739–1814), German general who served in the Imperial Russian army
- Ludger Pistor (born 1959), German actor
- Maternus Pistor (1470–1534), Roman Catholic prelate
- Nestor Pistor, stage name of Don Ast, Canadian-Romanian comedian

== See also ==
- H Pistorius & Co, a South African company
- Demian, a novel by Hermann Hesse, in which one of the characters is named Pistorius
- Pastorius (disambiguation)
