= Pastorius =

Pastorius may refer to:

== People ==
- Francis Daniel Pastorius (1651–c. 1720), leader of the first organized settlement of Germans in Pennsylvania
- Francis D. Pastorius (1920–1962), American lawyer and politician
- Jaco Pastorius (1951–1987), American jazz bassist and composer
  - Jaco Pastorius (album), a 1976 album
- Jim Pastorius (1881–1941), American professional baseball player

== Other ==
- Operation Pastorius, a failed sabotage attack by Nazi Germany on the United States in 1942
- Pastorius Park, a park in the Chestnut Hill neighborhood of Northwest Philadelphia, United States, named after Francis Daniel Pastorius

== See also ==
- Pistorius, a surname
