= Johann Pistorius the Elder =

German Protestant minister and Protestant reformer

Johann Pistorius the Elder

Johann Pistorius (January 1504, Nidda, Hesse – 25 January 1583, Nidda) was a German Protestant minister and Protestant reformer. In 1541, he was the Superintendent at the church in Nidda in Hesse.

Along with Philipp Melanchthon and Martin Bucer, Pistorius was appointed by Charles V to represent the Protestants at the Diet of Regensburg in 1541. He also participated in the Colloquy of Worms in 1557.

Pistorius was the father of Johann Pistorius (the Younger).
