= Johann Pistorius =

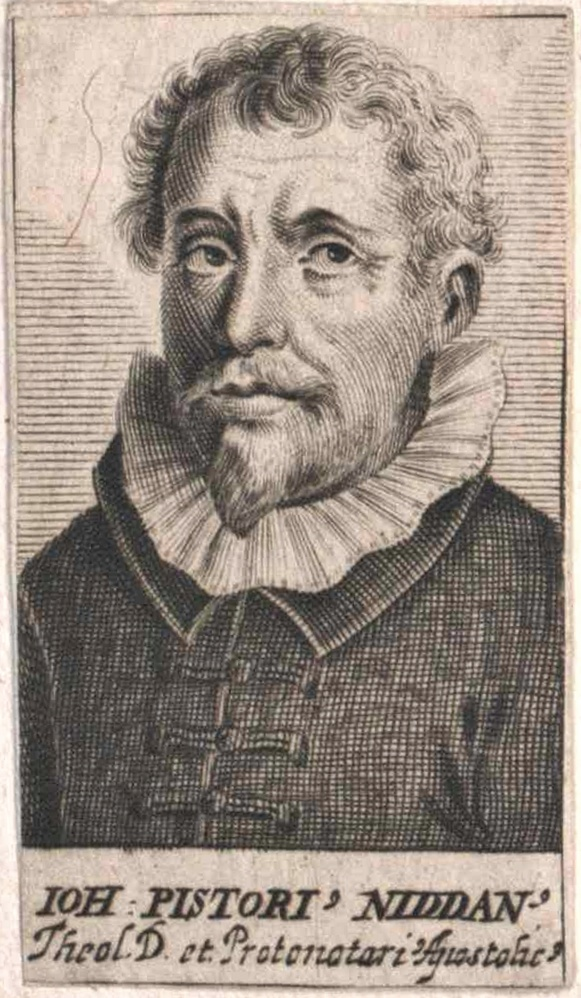
Johann Pistorius the Younger

Johann Pistorius (14 February 1546 – 19 June 1608), also anglicized as John Pistorius or distinguished as Johann Pistorius the Younger, was a German controversialist and historian. He is sometimes called Niddanus from the name of his birthplace, Nidda in Hesse.

== Life ==
His father was a well-known Protestant minister, Johann Pistorius the Elder (died 1583 at Nidda). From 1541 he was superintendent or chief minister of Nidda, and took part in several religious disputations between Catholics and Protestants.

Pistorius the Younger studied theology, law, and medicine at Marburg and Wittenberg 1559-67. He received the degree of Doctor of Medicine, and in 1575 was appointed court physician to the Margrave Karl II of Baden-Durlach, who frequently sought his advice in political and theological matters. Pistorius turned from Lutheranism to Calvinism; through his influence the Margrave Ernst Friedrich of Baden-Durlach made the same change.

As time went on, however, Pistorius became dissatisfied with Calvinism also. In 1584 he became a privy councillor of Margrave James III of Baden-Hochberg at Emmendingen; after further investigation he entered the Catholic Church in 1588. At his request the Margrave James brought about the religious disputations of Baden, 1589, and Emmendingen, 1590. After the second disputation the court preacher Johannes Zehender and the margrave himself became Catholics. James III, however, died on 17 August 1590, and being succeeded by his Protestant brother Ernst Friedrich, Pistorius was obliged to leave.

He went to Freiburg, became a priest in 1591, then vicar-general of Constance until 1594; after this he was an imperial councillor, cathedral provost of Breslau, Apostolic prothonotary, and in 1601 confessor to the Emperor Rudolph II. After his death his library came into the possession of the Jesuits of Molsheim and later was transferred to the theological seminary at Strasburg.

He died in Freiburg.

== Works ==
Pistorius published a detailed account of the conversion of Margrave James III: "Jakobs Marggrafen zu Baden ... christliche, erhebliche und wolfundirte Motifen" (Cologne, 1591). His numerous writings against Protestantism, while evincing clearness, skill, and thorough knowledge of his opponents, especially of Luther, are marked by controversial sharpness and coarseness.

The most important are: "Anatomia Lutheri" (Cologne, 1595-8);"Hochwichtige Merkzeichen des alten und neuen Glaubens" (Münster, 1599); "Wegweiser vor alle verführte Christen" (Münster, 1599). Pistorius was attacked violently by the Protestants; e. g., by Samuel Huber, Cyriakus Spangenberg, Balthasar Mentzer, Horstius, and Christoph Agricola. Replies to the "Anatomia Lutheri" were written by the Protestant theologians of Wittenberg and Hesse.

Pistorius also busied himself with cabalistic studies, and published "Artis cabbalisticæ, h. e. reconditæ theologiæ et philosophiæ scriptorum tomus unus" (Basle, 1587). As court historiographer to the Margrave of Baden, he investigated the genealogy of the princely House of Zähringen; he also issued two works on historical sources: "Polonicæ historiæ corpus, i. e. Polonicarum rerum latini veteres et recentiores scriptores quotquot exstant" (Basle, 1582), and "Rerum Germanicarum veteres jam primum publicati scriptores aliquot insignes medii ævi ad Carolum V" (Frankfort, 1583–1607).
