= Lauren Pfister =

Christian theologian and scholar of Confucianism

Lauren Frederick Pfister / 費樂仁
- Born: November 8, 1951 (age 74); Denver, Colorado, U.S.
- Education: University of Hawai’i at Manoa (PhD)
- Known for: Rector of the Hephzibah Mountain Aster Academy

Lauren Frederick Pfister (born in Denver, Colorado, USA in 1951) is a comparative philosophical and comparative religious researcher, a Christian theologian, and scholar of "Confucianism" or Ruist philosophy and religion. His interdisciplinary interests have included translation hermeneutics, religious and philosophical studies in contemporary China, studies of the renderings of Ruist and Daoist classics into European languages, pedagogical philosophy, philosophy of technology, the history of Chinese philosophical traditions, and comparative wisdom studies. Currently he is the Rector of the Hephzibah Mountain Aster Academy in the Colorado Rockies, a non-profit public charity in the USA that focuses on developing cross-cultural learning opportunities and mentoring programs for researchers at the graduate level and also for those who are university faculty members. Due to his thirty years of teaching in Hong Kong, he has been granted the status as Professor Emeritus at Hong Kong Baptist University, where he served as a faculty member of the Religion and Philosophy Department from 1987 to 2017. In addition, he is a founding fellow of the Hong Kong Academy of the Humanities. He was awarded the honor of "Distinguished Scholar" at the Tenth International Symposium on the History of Christianity in Modern China.

== Early life and career ==
During his undergraduate career, Pfister completed his studies in the honors program of American Studies at the University of Denver in 1973, and after a year of serving as a campus minister with Campus Ambassadors in the Denver area, received an MDiv degree at the Conservative Baptist Theological Seminary at Denver (now Denver Semianry) in 1978. He taught Biblical Hebrew at the Asian Theological Seminary in Philippines (1976-1977), and while pursuing his doctorate, taught at the International Graduate School of Theology in Koine Greek, Biblical Hebrew, Comparative Religions, and Ethics. After completing his doctoral studies in comparative philosophy at the University of Hawaii in 1987, developing a particular theme in political philosophy found within the works of Kang Youwei (1858-1927), Eugen Rosenstock-Huessy (1888-1973), and Juergen Habermas, he was invited to take up a position at the Hong Kong Baptist College in the Fall of 1987.

While teaching at Hong Kong Baptist College (made University in 1995), Pfister pursued research on the life and works of James Legge, and joined Norman J. Girardot in a major research project in that realm funded by the National Endowment for the Humanities (1992-1997). Later he also received support for his research, studies, and teaching in the history of Chinese philosophical traditions and of the translations of Chinese classics by Euro-American missionary-scholars from the German Research Society (Deutsche Forschungsgemeinschaft). Some of the more important contributions that have resulted from his published writings, besides his extensive works on James Legge, have been in the development of the conception of "missionary-scholars," the development of the conception of "post-secularity" in contemporary Chinese philosophical circles, the hermeneutics of translation in the European language renderings of Ruist and Daoist classical works, and comparative wisdom studies.

During his years residing in Hong Kong, he served as Assistant/Associate Editor of the Journal of Chinese Philosophy (1997-2017), Chairman of China Partner Hong Kong Ltd. (2008-2017), Founding Fellow of the Hong Kong Academy of Humanities (2011-present), Head of the Department of Religion and Philosophy at Hong Kong Baptist University (2011-2012), and Director of the Centre for Sino-Christian Studies (2012-2017). He has published over 300 articles in various journals, as chapters in books, and as articles in dictionaries and encyclopedias. Notably, he has published major studies on the life and works of the Scottish missionary-scholar, James Legge (1815-1897). In addition, he has published his own monographs, editing a few monographic studies on various realms of humanities studies, and participated in many works edited by others. Over the years he has given invited lectures in universities within the UK, Scotland, Wales, contemporary China, the USA, Australia, Taiwan, Germany, and Austria, and has served as a visiting professor at the University of New South Wales(2000), Melbourne University (2000), University of Bonn (2000-2001), Berne University (2007-2008), East China Normal University (2008), Zhejiang University (2018), and Guizhou University (2019).

Since his retirement from Hong Kong Baptist University in 2017, he and his wife have been living in the Colorado Rockies, and have sought to create a cross-cultural research center there. That dream became a reality in August 2022 with the formal creation of the Hephzibah Mountain Aster Academy in the US state of Colorado. As of September 2023, the HMAA was given the status of a non-profit public charity by the Internal Revenue Service, due to its promotion of cross-cultural learning and research, including an unusual set of research mentoring programs for graduate students and university faculty members in the humanities.

== Works ==
=== Books / Sets of Books ===
- Pfister with Zhang Xiping, Lauren F., ed. (2024–2025). Collected Works of James Legge in 13 volumes. Commercial Press, Beijing. (forthcoming)
- Pfister, Lauren F., ed. (2022). Polyglot from the Far Side of the Moon: The Life and Works of Solomon Caesar Malan (1812-1894). Monumenta Serica. ISBN 9781032136639.
- Pfister, Lauren F. (2020). Vital Post-Secular Perspectives on Chinese Philosophical Issues. Lexington Press. ISBN 1498593569.
- Pfister, Lauren F. (2016). An Interdisciplinary Studies Methodology for Translation: Selected Essays of the Sinologist Lauren Pfister (in Chinese, trans. by Yue Feng et al. Xiamen University Press. ISBN 978-7-5615-6118-8.
- with Zhang, Xiping, ed. (2010). The Chinese Classics with critical introductory essays in five volumes. East China Normal University Press.
- Pfister, Lauren F. (2004). Striving for "The Whole Duty of Man": James Legge (1815–1897) and the Scottish Protestant Encounter with China. Vol. 1–2. Peter Lang. ISBN 9780820464411.

=== Special Editor for Journal Issues ===
- Pfister, Lauren F., ed. Soren Kierkegaard and Chinese Philosophy, vol. 40, no. 1 of the Journal of Chinese Philosophy. Boston: Blackwell, 2013. 160 pages.
- Pfister, Lauren F., ed. Expanding Horizons of Religion and European Culture for China: Selected Essays of Zhao Fusan, (trans. Curie Qu Li), vol. 43, no. 3 Contemporary Chinese Thought. Spring 2012. 89 pages.
- Pfister, Lauren F., ed. Modern and Contemporary Chinese Hermeneutics. Journal of Chinese Philosophy 34, no. 1 (March 2007). 149 pages.
- Pfister, Lauren F., ed. Hermeneutic Thinking in Chinese Philosophy, vol. 1 of the Journal Supplement Series to the Journal of Chinese Philosophy. Boston: Blackwell, 2006. 159 pages.

== See also ==
- Centre for Sino-Christian Studies
- Hong Kong Baptist University
