= Mark Pretorius =

- Education: University of Pretoria (PhD 2007)
- Scientific career
- Fields: Theology, Philosophy, Metaphysics and Psychology
- Workplaces: South African Theological Seminary

Mark Pretorius (born 30 April in Johannesburg, South Africa) is an evangelical theologian, philosopher and metaphysician. He holds the following degrees: a BTh (South African Theological Seminary), a BTh Hons (University of Zululand), an M.A. in biblical studies (University of Johannesburg), and a PhD in systematic theology (University of Pretoria). Pretorius was a senior academic at the South African Theological Seminary, and currently a research associate in the department of systematic theology at the University of Pretoria.

== Research focus ==
Pretorius's doctoral work encompasses the interaction between science and theology, including integrating evolution and the creative acts of God found in Genesis 1–2. He has written several published articles on this relationship (amongst others), in the academic journals Verbum et Ecclesia, HTS Theological Studies, and Conspectus.

The core of Pretorius's research is a study of sound, specifically cymatics, which he assimilates into his studies of Genesis, and commonly refers to it as a cymatic theology. This model, which postulates that creation was initiated by sound (God's divinely spoken Word), was initially developed in a paper he presented at an academic meeting in Pretoria (South Africa) in August 2008. The concept of cymatics, on which the model is based, is a well-examined and published idea, especially in view of the work of Robert Hooke (1680), Ernst Chladni (1787), Hans Jenny (1967), and currently by John Stuart Reid.

In the last several years, Pretorius's research has moved towards studying spiritual consciousness and experiences, as attested by his recently published articles.

=== Readers ===
A significant part of Pretorius's academic work, was researching and compiling a wide variety of academic readers for theological students. These readers are used by students in various institutions around the world, who are in partnership with the South African Theological Seminary. Examples include ISTL (International Seminary of Theology and Leadership) in Switzerland, FIET (Facultad Internacional de Educación Teológica) in Argentina and EFGBC (Ethiopian Full Gospel Believers Church) in Ethiopia. Pretorius was able to research and assemble this material through the Seminary being a member of DALRO (Dramatic, Artistic and Literary Organisation). The work has enabled many disadvantaged students over the years to graduate through their various institutions.

Pretorius was also a contributor to the book Academic Writing and Theological Research: A Guide for Students, which is now the standard book recommended by many academic institutions for use by their students.

== Select articles ==
- “The Holy Spirit and His relationship to the Godhead in the light of Scripture” The Shepherd 6 (2) March–April 2005 20–22.
- “The Key to the Present Fulfilment of the Eschatological Inclusion of the Gentiles in the People of God”, HTS Theological Studies 61(4) 2005 1339–1352.
- “Evolution or Creation” Christian Living Today Issue 159 Sept 2006 38–41.
- “Justification as it relates to Adam and Christ within the New Covenant” Conspectus. Vol. 1(1) 2006 43–64.
- “The Theological Centre of Pauline Theology as it relates to the Holy Spirit” HTS Theological Studies. 62 (1) 2006 253–262.
- “How does Prayer Affect God’s Plan: An Enquiry into God’s Providence, with Special Reference to Prayer and Healing” Conspectus. Vol. 2 (1) 2006 56–71.
- “Shaping Eschatology within Science and Theology” Verbum et Ecclesia Vol. 28 (I) 2007 191–206.
- “Providence and Gods Emergent Will: How it relates to Determinism and Prayer for Healing”. Verbum et Ecclesia. Vol. 28 (2) 2007 580–601.
- “Human Freedom and God’s Providence: Is there conflict?” Conspectus. Vol. 8 (2) 2009. 62–75.
- “The Sobriety Journey of an Alcoholic”. JOY Magazine 19 (9) October 2010 66–68.
- “Sound: Conceivably the Creative Language of God, Holding all of Creation in Concert”. Verbum et Ecclesia. Vol. 32 (1) 2011.
- “The Creation and Fall of Adam and Eve: Literal, Symbolic or Myth?” Conspectus Vol. 12 (2) Sept 2011 259–282.
- “The Remarkable Cell: Intelligently Designed or by Evolutionary Process?” Verbum et Ecclesia. Vol. 34 (1) 2013.
- “An Epigrammatic Analysis on Open Theism and its Impact on Classical Christianity”, HTS Theological Studies 69 (1) 2013
- “Die Reis Na Nugterhuid” JUIG Tydskrif 6 (1) January 2014 52–54.
- “The Role of Religious Experience vis-à-vis Religious Belief in Improving Mental and Physical Health: Empirical Findings from Psychology and Neuroscience”. ESSSAT-Yearbook SSTH 2015 129–142.
- “Is Consciousness a Product of the Brain, or/and a Divine Act of God? Concise Insights from Neuroscience and Christian Theology”, HTS Theological Studies 72 (4) 2016.
- “A Metaphysical and Neuropsychological Assessment of Musical Tones to Relax the Mind, Affect the Brain and Heal the Body” Verbum et Ecclesia 2017.

== Books and book contributions ==
- "Academic Writing and Theological Research: A Guide for Students" (2008). JHB: SA Theological Seminary Press. ISBN 978-0-620-41413-5
- "The Holy Spirit: A Systemised Study of the Spirit's Person and Work" Vol 1 (2012). JHB: SA Theological Seminary Press. ISBN 978-1-478-35552-6
- "Science and Religion: A Historical Introduction to Supposedly Competing Worldviews" (2012). Cornel W du Toit (ed.) Knowing, Believing, Living in Africa: Perspectives from Science and Religion (vol. 15) 51–62. Pretoria: University of South Africa. ISBN 978-1-86888-718-7
- "A Pauline Theology of the Holy Spirit in Covenant and Sonship" Vol 2 (2013). JHB: SA Theological Seminary Press. ISBN 978-0-620-56529-5
- "Prayer: How to pray and Receive God's Best for Your Life. A Practical Guide to Answered Prayer" (2014.) JHB: SA Theological Press. ISBN 978-0-620-56471-7
- "To Tithe Lawfully or Give Joyfully: A Scriptural Journey to Financial Freedom" (2015). JHB: SA Theological Seminary Press. ISBN 978-0-9946649-0-7

== Associations, boards and committees ==
- Member: Society for Pentecostal Studies (2010–2012)
- Member: The European Society for the Study of Science and Theology (ESSSAT)
- Member: Society for Practical Theology South Africa (SPTSA)
- Member: International Society for the Study of Time (ISST)
- Board of Referees, (Conspectus: Journal of the SA Theological Seminary)
