= Marianne Schwankhart =

South African rock climber

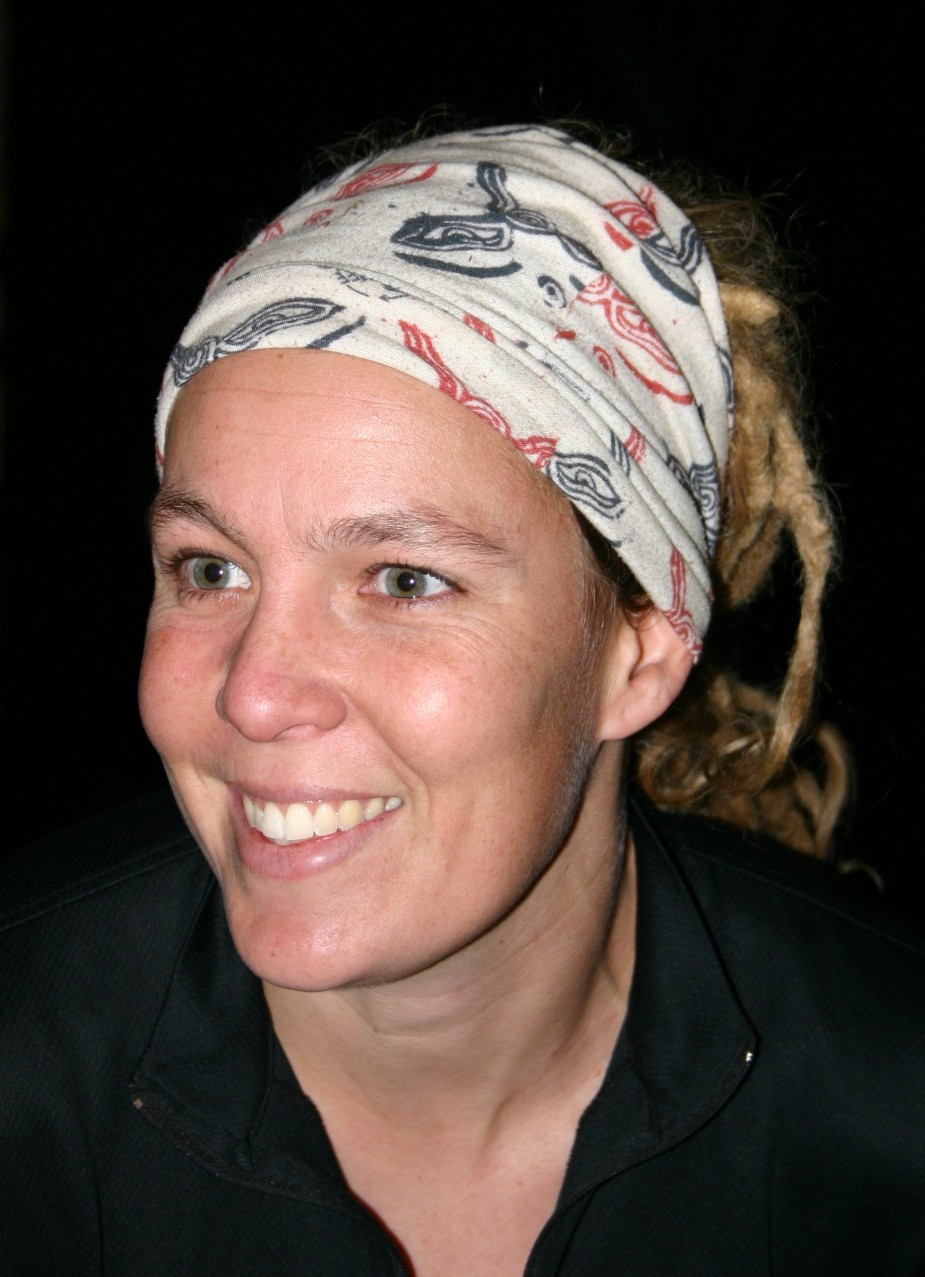

Marianne Schwankhart (born 2 September 1976) is a South African rock climber, specialising in big walls. In 2004 she became the first woman to scale the East face of the Central Torres del Paine in Chilean Patagonia. In February 2005 she climbed the "Compressor" route on Cerro Torre. On 21 August 2005 Schwankhart, with Peter Lazarus, James Pitman and Andreas Kiefer, ascended Trango Tower in Pakistan.

== Biography ==
In 2007, she joined Pierre Carter, as project photographer, in his bid to paraglide off the summit of the highest mountain on each continent. Schwankhart and Carter flew in tandem in order for her to capture the full experience on film. In July 2010 they flew off Mount Elbrus in Russia, the highest mountain in Europe. In December of the same year they summited Aconcagua in Argentina, the highest mountain in South America, but could not fly from the summit due to gale-force winds.

In September 2011, they successfully flew off the summit of Kilimanjaro.
