= Pfisterer Group =

German manufacturer

Pfisterer Holding SE
- Type: Societas Europaea
- ISIN: DE000PFSE212
- Industry: Electrical equipment
- Founded: 1921; 105 years ago
- Founder: Karl Pfisterer
- Headquarters: Winterbach, Baden-Württemberg, Germany
- Key people: Johannes Linden (CEO)
- Revenue: €383.1 million (2024)
- Number of employees: 1,239 (2024)
- Website: pfisterer.com

The Pfisterer Group is a German manufacturer of high-voltage cable accessories in the areas of low voltage, medium voltage, high voltage, and extra-high voltage. The products for all voltage levels from 110 V to 1,100 kV are used in power networks, offshore wind turbines, overhead contact lines of electrical railways, overhead lines, and connection components in industrial drives. The German/Swiss family enterprise, which also includes Lapp Insulators, has a presence in 18 countries and generated annual revenue of more than €400 million in 2015.

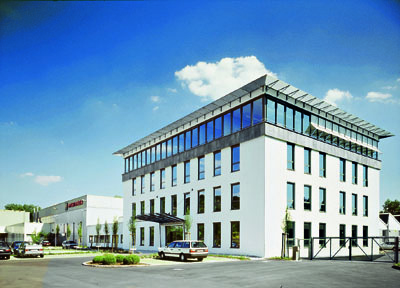
Pfisterer in Winterbach, Germany

== History ==
=== From the company's foundation until 1945 ===
Karl Pfisterer founded “Karl Pfisterer, Fabrik elektrotechnischer Spezialartikel” in Stuttgart in 1921. The company's original headquarters were in Kelterstrasse in the city's Untertürkheim (Stuttgart) district. During this era of electrification, there were often difficulties with metal connecting elements of conductors. Trained electrician Karl Pfisterer focused on this problem and developed improved electrical fittings. Demand for Pfisterer fittings rose steadily. By 1927, the company had grown to employ a workforce of 54 and relocated to Augsburger Strasse 375, where it would be headquartered for the next 60 years.

In 1937, Karl Pfisterer expanded his business segment to include fittings for high-voltage overhead cables and switchgear connectors. He patented an anchor clamp for steel-aluminum cables. Karl Pfisterer also developed the forging technique for non-ferrous metals and acquired the first test machines for his own development experiments.

The company adopted the legal form of Kommanditgesellschaft (KG: limited partnership) in 1940. In 1942, company founder Karl Pfisterer died. His son, Walter Pfisterer, continued his father's work, as the company's personally liable partner and sole managing director. During an air-raid on Stuttgart on December 9, 1944, the production facility in Stuttgart-Untertürkheim was completely destroyed.

=== From the post-war period to the present ===
The company was rebuilt in the 1950s. In 1954, a new factory was completed in Inselstrasse in Stuttgart-Untertürkheim. Founded in Malters, Switzerland, in 1957, SEFAG was the first branch outside Germany. The company began using plastics on an industrial scale in 1962 with the new plant in Winterbach. In 1968, Pfisterer invented the compact screw terminal, which became the technical standard used to connect all new builds in Germany to underground power networks from the end of the 1960s. The following year, Pfisterer received the patent for compact fuse disconnector strips for low-voltage distributors and used them in plastic distributing cabinets, a new development at the time.

In 1971, Karl-Heinz Pfisterer the son of Walter Pfisterer, joined the company as the third generation of the family. Pfisterer stepped up its investments outside Germany in the 1970s. The company's international reputation for erecting overhead transmission lines led to an unusual contract: To link the elements of the glass roof of the Munich Olympic Stadium, Pfisterer developed and manufactured special connectors. In 1975, which marked the company's 50th anniversary, Pfisterer received the patent on its Connex cable connection system for medium-voltage applications. This enabled medium-voltage connections to be installed as modules with factory-tested components.

Pfisterer Holding AG was founded in Winterbach in 1986. Following a restructuring initiative, the administrative headquarters were located in Stuttgart-Untertürkheim, parts manufacturing in Gussenstadt, and assembly in Winterbach. New application areas were added in 2000. Pfisterer expanded its activities to include transport technology, new energy sources, and industrial applications. In rail engineering, the low-voltage Plug system, which transmits high currents in adverse environmental conditions, was deployed for the first time. Today, almost every state-of-the-art high-speed train is equipped with this system.

In 2001, Pfisterer gave up its offices in Stuttgart-Untertürkheim and relocated the company's headquarters to Winterbach. In 2004, the Pfisterer Group pooled its areas of activity in four international centers of expertise: cable systems (Winterbach, Germany), components (Gussenstadt, Germany), overhead systems (Malters, Switzerland), and railway catenary systems (Barcelona, Spain).

In 2015, Pfisterer launched its comprehensive Next Level growth and innovation program. As part of this initiative, a new production facility was created in the Czech town of Kadaň. By acquiring Lapp Insulators, one of the largest providers of high-voltage insulators made of ceramics and compound materials, the group secured a leading position on the global market for high-voltage insulators. Pfisterer's newly developed Crosspower hybrid power system was also deployed in the field for the first time in 2015. The intelligent management system balances out the different amounts of electrical power generated by wind turbines, solar cells, and diesel generators, enabling reliable, decentralized power supply from renewable sources.

== Company structure ==
In addition to the company's headquarters in Winterbach, the Pfisterer Group has production facilities in Europe, North and South America, and South Africa, as well as sales offices in 18 countries in Europe, Asia, Africa, South America and the United States. The Pfisterer family continues to hold all the shares in the company to this day. Karl-Heinz Pfisterer and his niece Dorothee Staengel are members of the supervisory board of the Aktiengesellschaft.
