= Wilhelm Raabe =

German novelist (1831-1910)

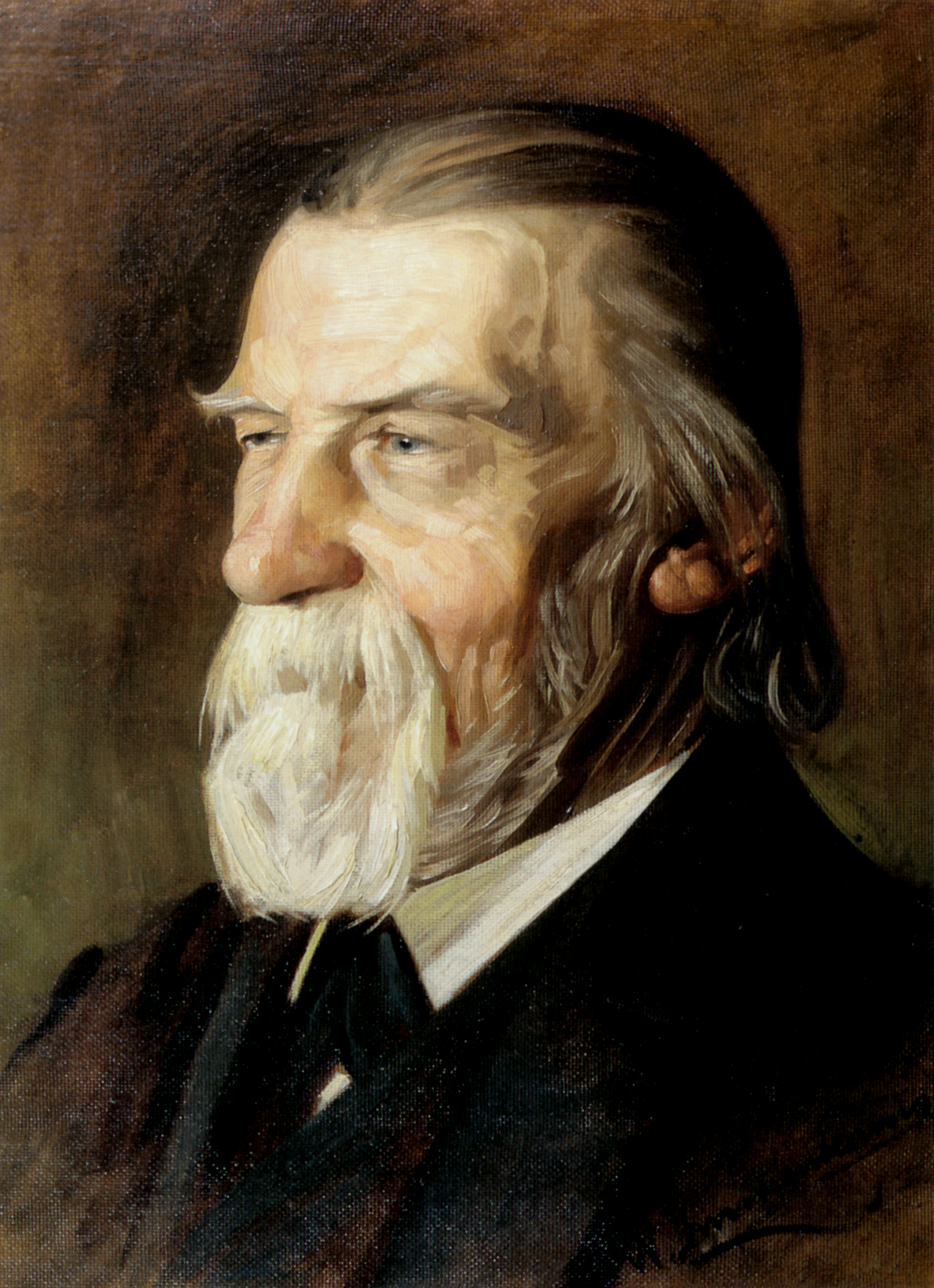
Wilhelm Raabe (1911), by Wilhelm Immenkamp

Wilhelm Raabe (German pronunciation: [ˈvɪlhɛlm ˈʁaːbə]; September 8, 1831 – November 15, 1910) was a German novelist. His early works were published under the pseudonym of Jakob Corvinus.

== Biography ==
He was born in Eschershausen (then in the Duchy of Brunswick, now in the Holzminden District). After attending gymnasia in Holzminden and Wolfenbüttel, he entered a bookstore in Magdeburg as apprentice in 1849. He used this opportunity for wide reading and enriched himself with the tales and folklore of his own and other countries. He remained an apprentice until 1854.

Tiring of the routine of business, he then studied philosophy at Berlin (1855–1857). While a student at that university, under his pseudonym he published his first work, The Chronicle of Sparrow Lane (German: Die Chronik der Sperlingsgasse). This book, which contains sketches of life among the German bourgeoisie, quickly became popular.

With this encouragement, Raabe gave up his studies and devoted himself entirely to literary work. He returned to Wolfenbüttel, and then lived (1862–1870) in Stuttgart. Then he again returned to Brunswick and remained active until the end of the century, publishing upwards of 30 novels and a number of short stories and sketches. He died in 1910 and was buried in Braunschweig Main Cemetery.

== Work ==
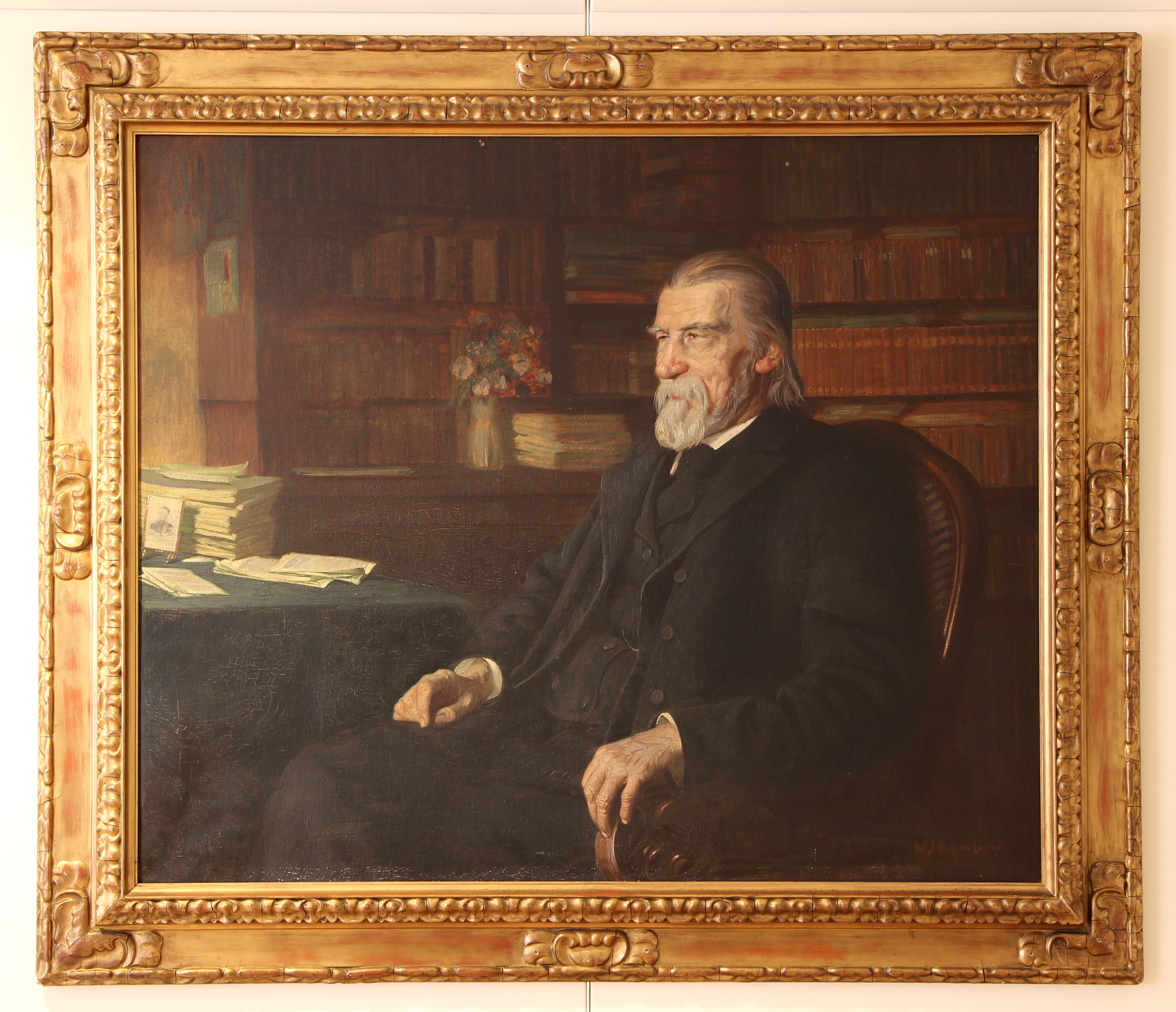
Painting by Wilhelm Immelkamp, 1909

Raabe's life work may be divided into three periods. During the first, he wrote with a light touch, producing a series of pictures of German life from the abundance of his imagination and experience, among which are:

- Die Chronik der Sperlingsgasse (1856)
- Die Kinder von Finkenrode (1859)
- Unser Herrgotts Kanzlei (1862)

The influence of the pessimism of Schopenhauer is evident during the second period. Representative works of this period are:

- Der Hungerpastor (1864)
- Abu Telfan (1867)
- Der Schüdderump (1870)

These three works are sometimes referred to as a trilogy. While they are independent of each other in substance, they do represent a distinct epoch in the life of Raabe.

During the third period of the novelist's life his works no longer show this pessimistic strain. A genial humor pervades them, reminiscent of Dickens, though they frequently deal with serious subjects. Horacker (1876) perhaps best represents this tendency, and has been cited as his masterpiece. Der Dräumling (1872), and Deutscher Mondschein (1873), also come under this head. Of his numerous later works Das Odfeld (1889) and The Birdsong Papers (Die Akten des Vogelsangs, 1895) seemed to be most read. Kloster Lugau (1894) and Hastenbeck (1899) also belong to this period.

Raabe's early works were influenced to some extent by Jean Paul. Later he shows evidences of having read Dickens and Thackeray.

His estimation by the German people was especially shown at the celebration of his 70th birthday in 1901. Beginning in 1965, the critical edition of Raabe's complete works was published as Sämtliche Werke (Braunschweiger Ausgabe) commissioned by the Braunschweigischen Wissenschaftlichen Gesellschaft and edited by Karl Hoppe.

== Works ==
- Die Chronik der Sperlingsgasse, 1857
- Ein Frühling, Der Weg zum Lachen, 1857
- Die alte Universität, Der Student von Wittenberg, Weihnachtsgeister, Lorenz Scheibenhart, Einer aus der Menge, 1858
- Die Kinder von Finkenrode, Der Junker von Denow, Wer kann es wenden? 1859
- Aus dem Lebensbuch des Schulmeisterleins Michel Haas, Ein Geheimnis, 1860
- Auf dunkelm Grunde, Die schwarze Galeere, Der heilige Born, Nach dem großen Kriege, 1861
- Unseres Herrgotts Kanzlei, Das letzte Recht, 1862
- Eine Grabrede aus dem Jahre 1609, Die Leute aus dem Walde, Holunderblüte, Die Hämelschen Kinder, 1863
- Der Hungerpastor, Keltische Knochen, 1864
- Else von der Tanne, Drei Federn, 1865
- Die Gänse von Bützow, Sankt Thomas, Gedelöcke, 1866
- Abu Telfan; oder Heimkehr aus dem Mondgebirge, 1867
- Theklas Erbschaft, 1868
- Im Siegeskranze, 1869
- Der Schüdderump, Der Marsch nach Hause, Des Reiches Krone, 1870
- Der Dräumling, 1872
- Deutscher Mondschein, Christoph Pechlin, 1873
- Meister Autor oder Die Geschichten vom versunkenen Garten, Höxter und Corvey, 1874
- Frau Salome, Vom alten Proteus, Eulenpfingsten, 1875
- Die Innerste, Der gute Tag, Horacker, 1876
- Auf dem Altenteil, 1878
- Alte Nester, Wunnigel, 1879
- Deutscher Adel, 1880
- Das Horn von Wanza, 1881
- Fabian und Sebastian, 1882
- Prinzessin Fisch, 1883
- Villa Schönow, Pfisters Mühle, Zum wilden Mann, Ein Besuch, 1884
- Unruhige Gäste, 1885
- Im alten Eisen, 1887
- Das Odfeld, 1888
- Der Lar, 1889
- Stopfkuchen, 1891
- Gutmanns Reisen, 1892
- Kloster Lugau, 1894
- Die Akten des Vogelsangs, 1896
- Hastenbeck, 1899
- Altershausen (fragment, 1902; published 1911)

== Raabe the painter ==
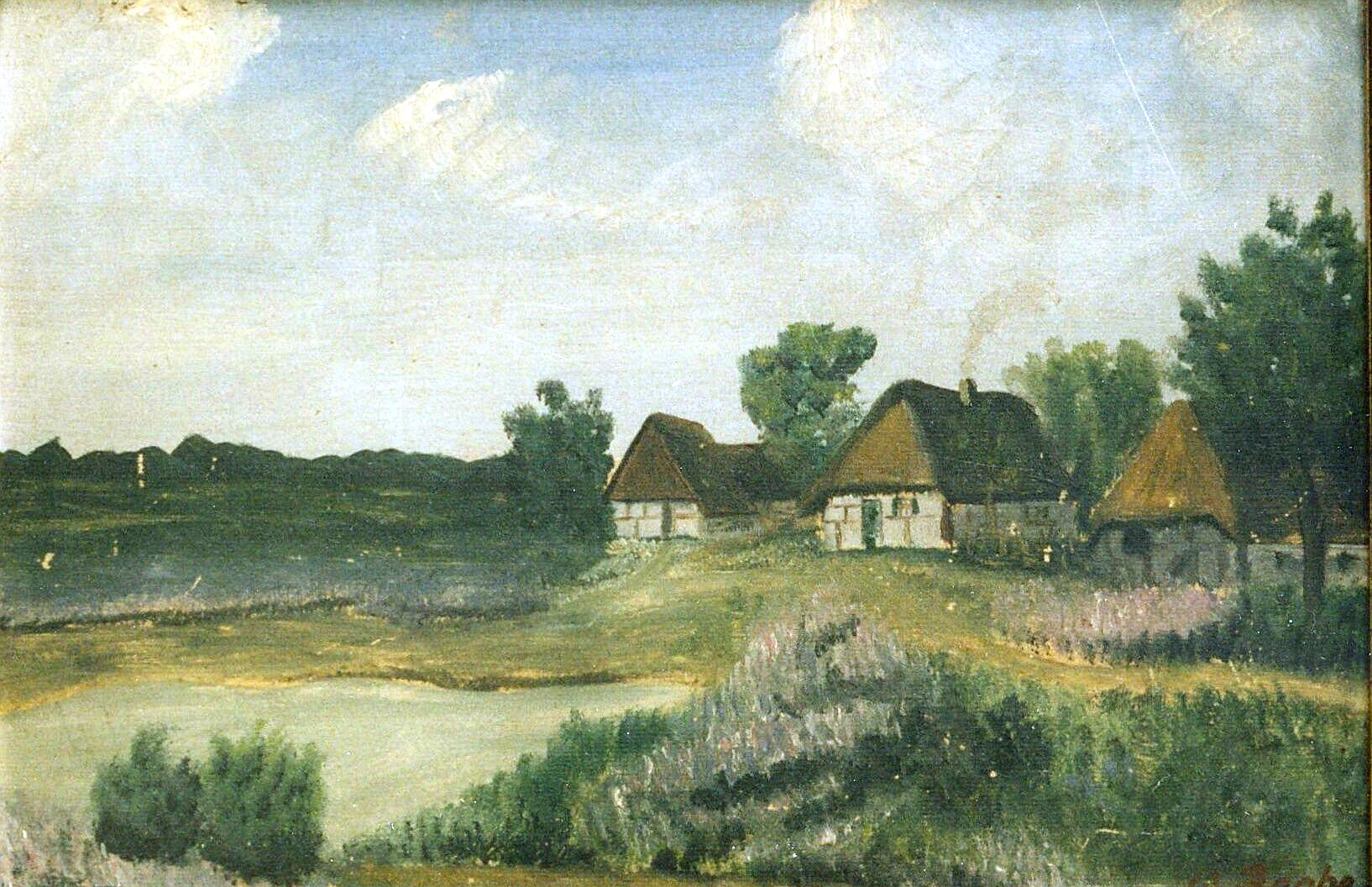
Farmer's cottage in a heath landscape, oil, 37.0 × 23.2 cm.

Raabe also had a less known talent for painting. Approximately 600 of his works exist, partially in private ownership of his descendants or with the Braunschweig Museum.
