= Stephen Pistorius =

Canadian medical physicist

Stephen Pistorius PhD PPhys FCOMP
- Born: Durban, Kwazulu-Natal, South Africa
- Education: University of Natal (BSc); Stellenbosch University (BSc, MSc, PhD)
- Known for: Breast cancer research; Microwave imaging
- Scientific career
- Fields: Medical Physics
- Workplaces: University of Manitoba; CancerCare Manitoba
- Thesis: The analysis and modelling of broad beams of photons and electrons (1991)

Stephen Pistorius PhD PPhys FCOMP is a South African-Canadian academic and medical physicist.

Pistorius is currently a full professor at the University of Manitoba, where he is the founder and Director of its Medical Physics program. His research focuses on microwave imaging for the detection and treatment of breast cancer, including novel image reconstruction techniques and imaging applications in orthopaedics and radiation therapy.

Pistorius previously served as Provincial Director of Medical Physics at CancerCare Manitoba, the province's cancer screening and treatment institute. He also served as President of the Canadian Organization of Medical Physicists (2006-2008) and of the Canadian Association of Physicists (2017-2018). In 2025, he was awarded the Peter Kirkby Memorial Medal for Outstanding Service to Canadian Physics.

He is the author of more than 300 publications and presentations and is the recipient of numerous national and international awards, including over $4.5 million in national research grants.

== Early life ==
Pistorius was born in Durban, South Africa. After earning a B.Sc. in Physics & Geography from the University of Natal in 1977, he was conscripted into the Engineering Corps of the South African army. He served a two-year tour of duty, fulfilling the national service requirement in place at the time.

Following his national service, Pistorius worked in industry in Johannesburg, installing South Africa's first industrial linear accelerator in Benoni in 1980. He then continued his education at Stellenbosch University, completing a B.Sc. (Hons.) in radiation physics in 1983 and an M.Sc. in medical sciences in 1984. Following a two-year residency in medical physics, he was certified as a medical physicist by the Health Professions Council of South Africa in 1986.

Pistorius subsequently returned to Stellenbosch, where he obtained a Ph.D. in physics in 1991.

== Career ==
In 1992, Pistorius moved to Winnipeg, Canada, to join CancerCare Manitoba (then called the Manitoba Cancer Treatment and Research Foundation), the province's cancer screening and treatment institute. He initially focused on clinical therapy, and was tasked with improving Manitoba's underdeveloped medical physics capabilities.

Within a short time, Pistorius was invited to join the Department of Physics & Astronomy at the University of Manitoba, an appointment which he credits as having "started [his] research career". He continued to lead the medical physics team at CancerCare Manitoba, establishing a joint medical physics training program between the institute, the University of Manitoba, and the University of Winnipeg. He became CancerCare Manitoba's first Director of Medical Physics in 1995, and then its first Provincial Director of Medical Physics – a C-level position responsible for cancer screening and research across the province – in 2000.

In 2002, Pistorius was licensed as a professional physicist (P.Phys.) by the Canadian Association of Physicists (CAP), an organization he would later lead. In 2005, he acquired a postgraduate diploma in business management from Heriot-Watt University in Edinburgh. Pistorius was promoted to full professorship within the Department of Physics & Astronomy, and received a second academic appointment as an Associate Professor in the Faculty of Medicine's Department of Radiology. In 2010, he moved to the University on a full-time basis; his role at CancerCare Manitoba thus changed to that of a senior researcher, though he remained affiliated with the organization until the late 2010s.

Pistorius has maintained his certification as a medical physicist and his licence as a professional physicist. Pistorius is also a Fellow of the Canadian Organization of Medical Physicists, an organization he served as President in 2006-2008 (and as Past President until 2010). Pistorius is a senior member of the IEEE, a lifetime member of the American Association of Medical Physicists, and a former President (2017-2018) of the Canadian Association of Physicists. He is also active internationally; he sits on the editorial board of the African Journal of Medical Physics, and has contributed to developing medical physics programs in the US, UK, Ireland, South Africa, India, Nigeria, and Portugal.

== Research ==
Pistorius's research focuses on cancer imaging, seeking to improve early detection and treatment of breast cancer, with a particular emphasis on rural and developing nations.

Over the years, this has included novel non-ionizing breast imaging techniques (such as tomographic and radar-based microwave imaging), scatter-enhanced x-ray and gamma ray emissions, and the use of megavoltage portal imaging and 3D dosimetry reconstructions to enable real-time, in vivo tracking of patients undergoing radiation treatment.

Since 2015, Pistorius and his team have been developing breast cancer screening devices for use in developing countries or remote locations, where the technology to conduct mammograms, ultrasounds, or MRI scans is either unavailable or prohibitively expensive – or in areas, such as Canada, where routine mammography rates are declining and where an additional "pre-screen" device would improve times for diagnosis and treatment (and therefore rates of survival). In 2016, the team's "Comfort Wave Mobile Imaging" device was submitted for Health Canada approval before beginning clinical trials. Pistorius subsequently secured Class 3 licensing for the device, which is now being tested using 3D-printed, anatomically accurate breast phantoms.

In recent years, Pistorius's work has expanded into artificial intelligence and machine learning, particularly in analyzing images and in detecting (and classifying) tumours. This research has enabled microwave-based screening tools to reach detection rates equivalent to traditional x-ray mammography, opening the door to fast, accurate, readerless detection of early-stage breast cancer.

== Selected honours and awards ==
- 2008, Senior Member of the IEEE.
- 2012, Fellow of the Canadian Organization of Medical Physicists.
- 2025, Peter Kirkby Memorial Medal for Outstanding Service to Canadian Physics.
