= Braunschweig Main Cemetery =

Lutheran church operated cemetery in Braunschweig, Germany

Hauptfriedhof Braunschweig
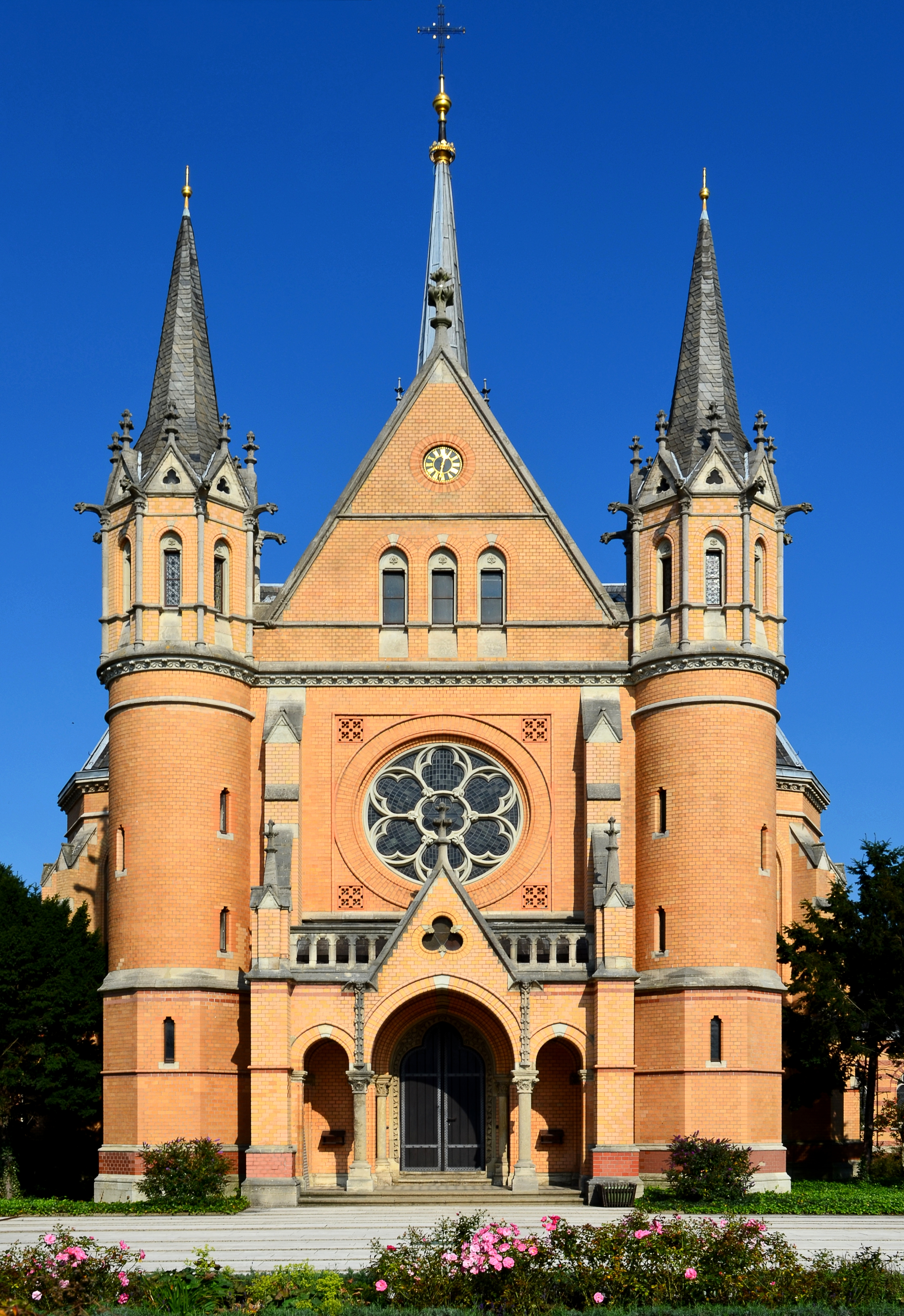
- The Neo-Gothic cemetery chapel
- Interactive map of Hauptfriedhof Braunschweig

Details
- Established: 1887
- Location: Braunschweig
- Country: Germany
- Coordinates: 52°15′26″N 10°33′35″E
- Type: Protestant cemetery
- Owned by: Evangelical Lutheran Church in Brunswick
- Size: 43 ha (110 acres)
- Website: The official website
- Find a Grave: Hauptfriedhof Braunschweig

The Braunschweig Main Cemetery (German: Der Braunschweiger Hauptfriedhof) on Helmstedter street is a historic, church-owned and operated Lutheran cemetery located in the city of Braunschweig, in Germany. With a land area of approximately 43 ha, it is the second largest church-owned Christian cemetery in Germany, after the Stahnsdorf South-Western Cemetery near Potsdam. The cemetery is operated by the administration of the Evangelical Lutheran Provost Association of Braunschweiger Land. The cemetery ground contains two residential buildings built for the cemetery manager and gardener at the main entrance which is used as the headquarters of the cemetery administration today, a neo-Gothic chapel, as well as a crematorium facility established in 1911.

== History and description ==
The Central Cemetery of Braunschweig was inaugurated on October 1, 1887, by Mayor Wilhelm Pockels and the Lutheran provost General-Superintendent Wilhelm Beste consecrated the burial ground, along with the chapel. The first burial recorded was of the master baker Friedrichs on October 4. Braunschweig Main Cemetery has since replaced the old Protestant cemeteries of the individual Lutheran parishes of Braunschweig which were running out of burial space. The main cemetery complex houses the Protestant cemetery administration along with the Evangelical Lutheran cemetery chapel which was built in Gothic-Revival style by the architect Ludwig Winter, and a ceremony hall for funerals. A new pipe organ was installed at the chapel in 1962.

The cemetery is the final resting place of many renowned personalities and prominent figures, including architects, composers, writers and artists.

== Notable burials ==
List is sorted in order of the year of death.

- Hermann Blumenau (1819–1899), German pharmacist who founded the city of Blumenau in the state of Santa Catarina, Brazil
- Wilhelm Raabe (1831–1910), novelist
- Richard Dedekind (1831–1916), mathematician who made important contributions to number theory, abstract algebra (particularly ring theory), and the axiomatic foundations of arithmetic
- Oswald Berkhan (1834–1917), physician
- Hans Sommer (1837–1922), composer and mathematician
- Käthe Buchler (1876–1930), photographer
- Rudolf Huch (1862–1943), Brazilian-born German jurist, essayist and author
- Walter Dexel (1890-1973), painter, commercial graphic designer
- Norbert Schultze (1911-2002), composer of film music who is best remembered for having written the melody of the World War II classic "Lili Marleen"

== Gallery ==
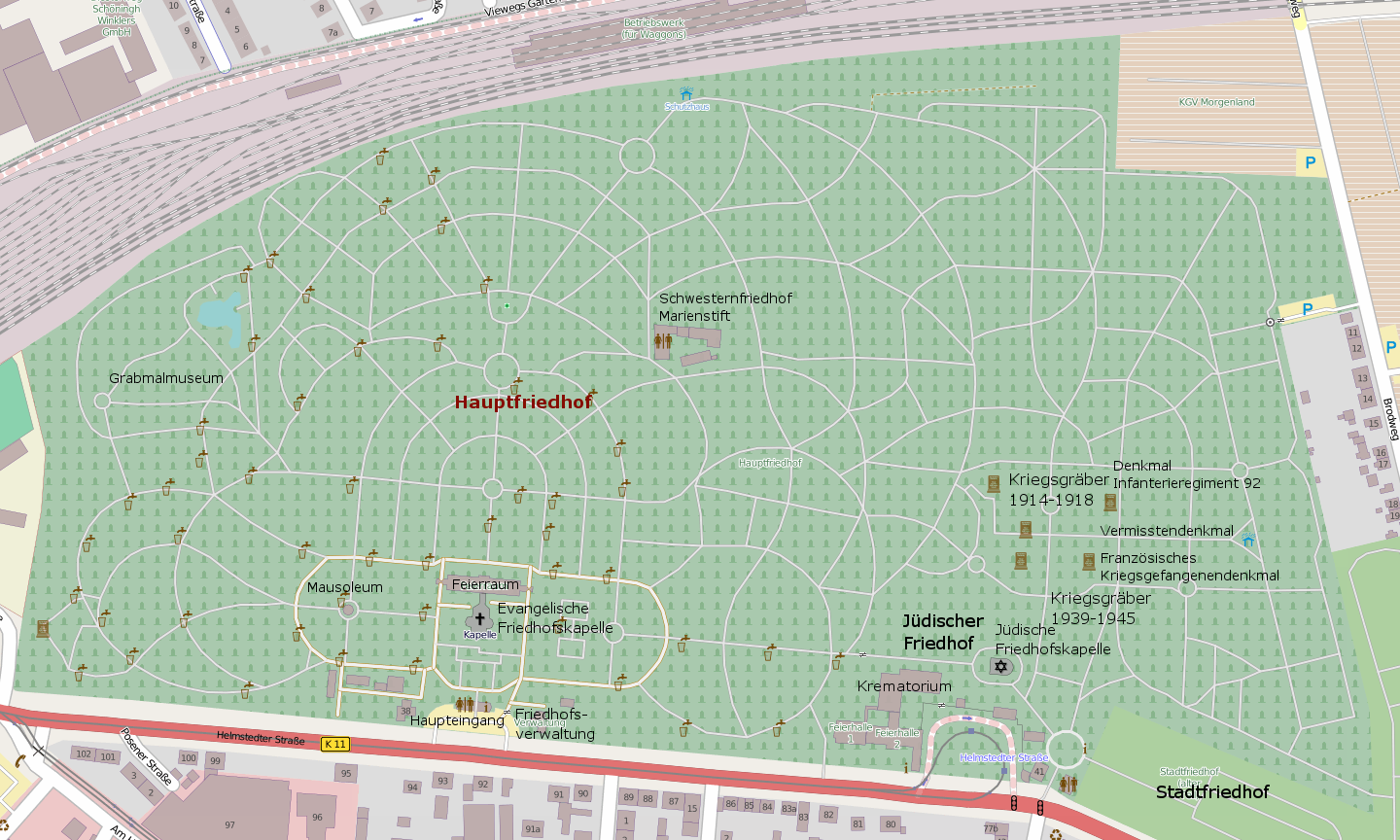
Map of the cemetery

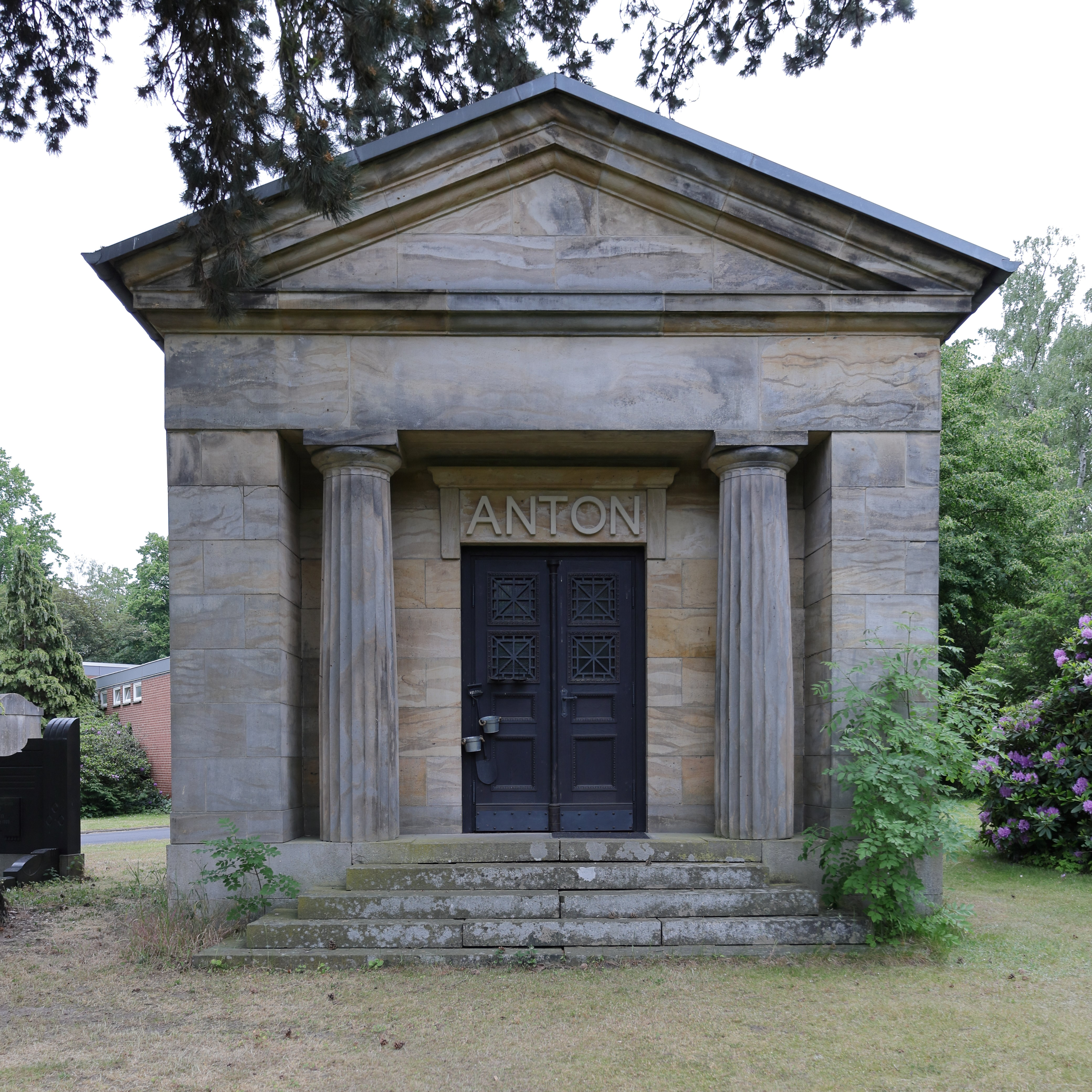
A family mausoleum on the cemetery ground

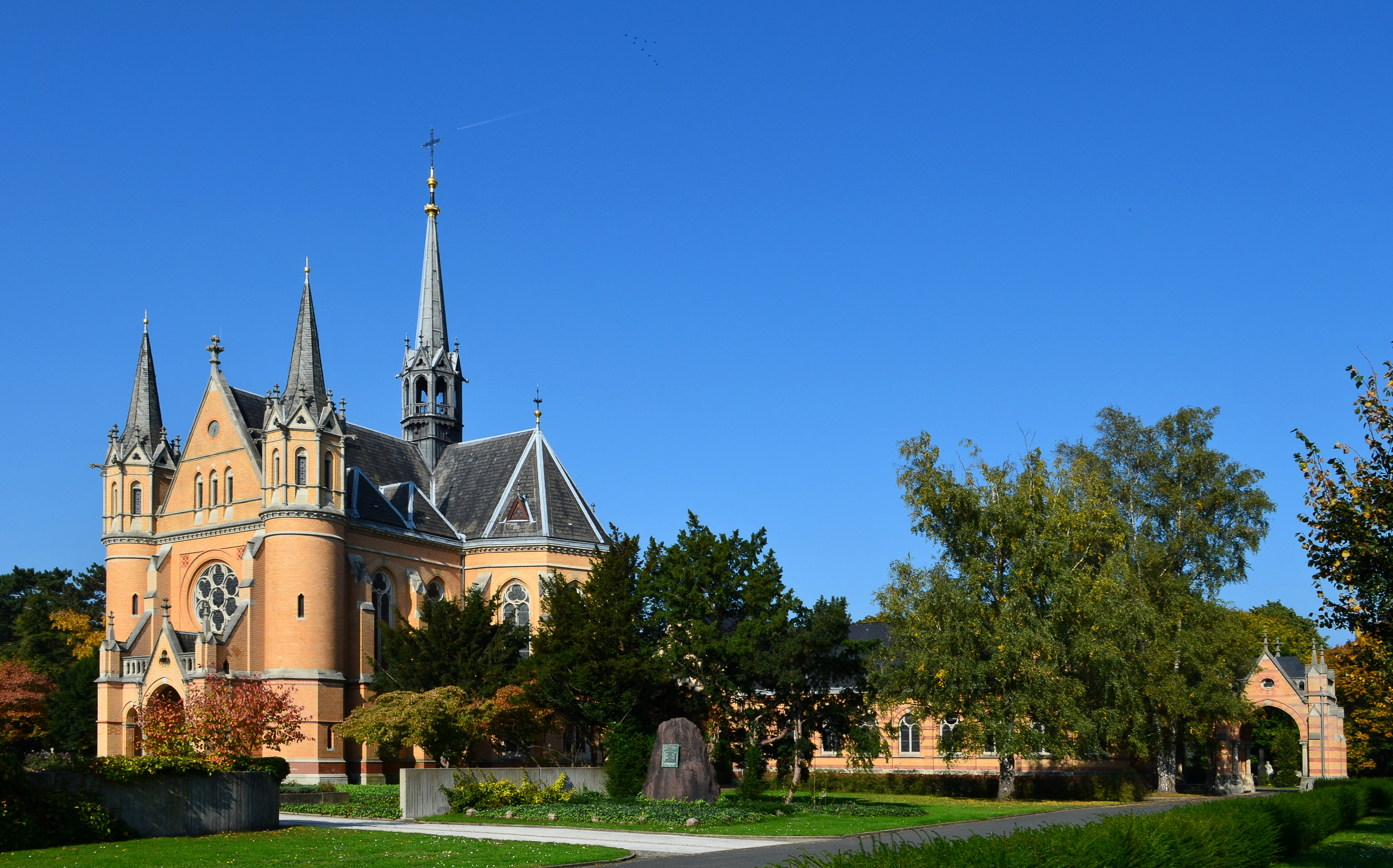

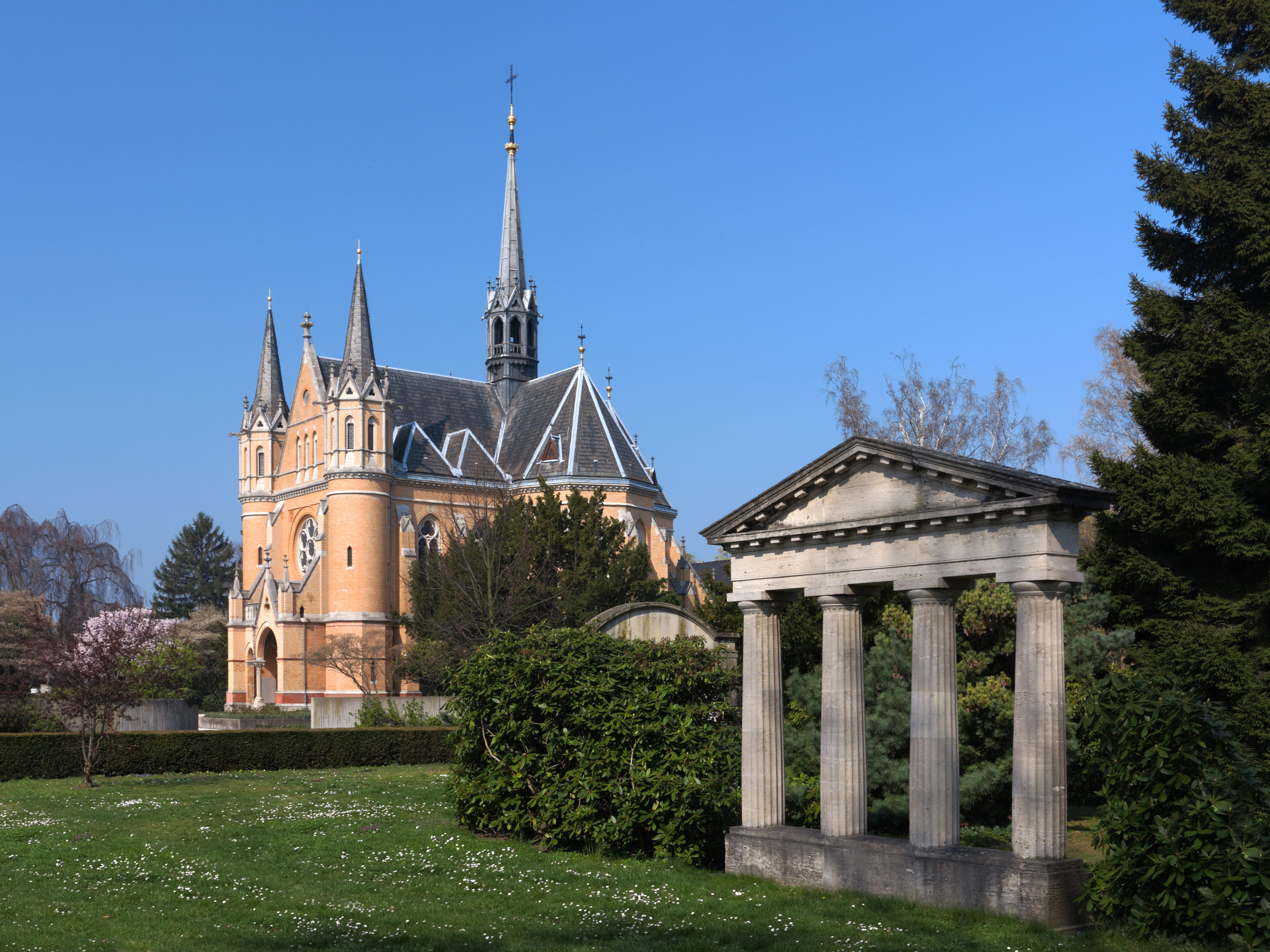

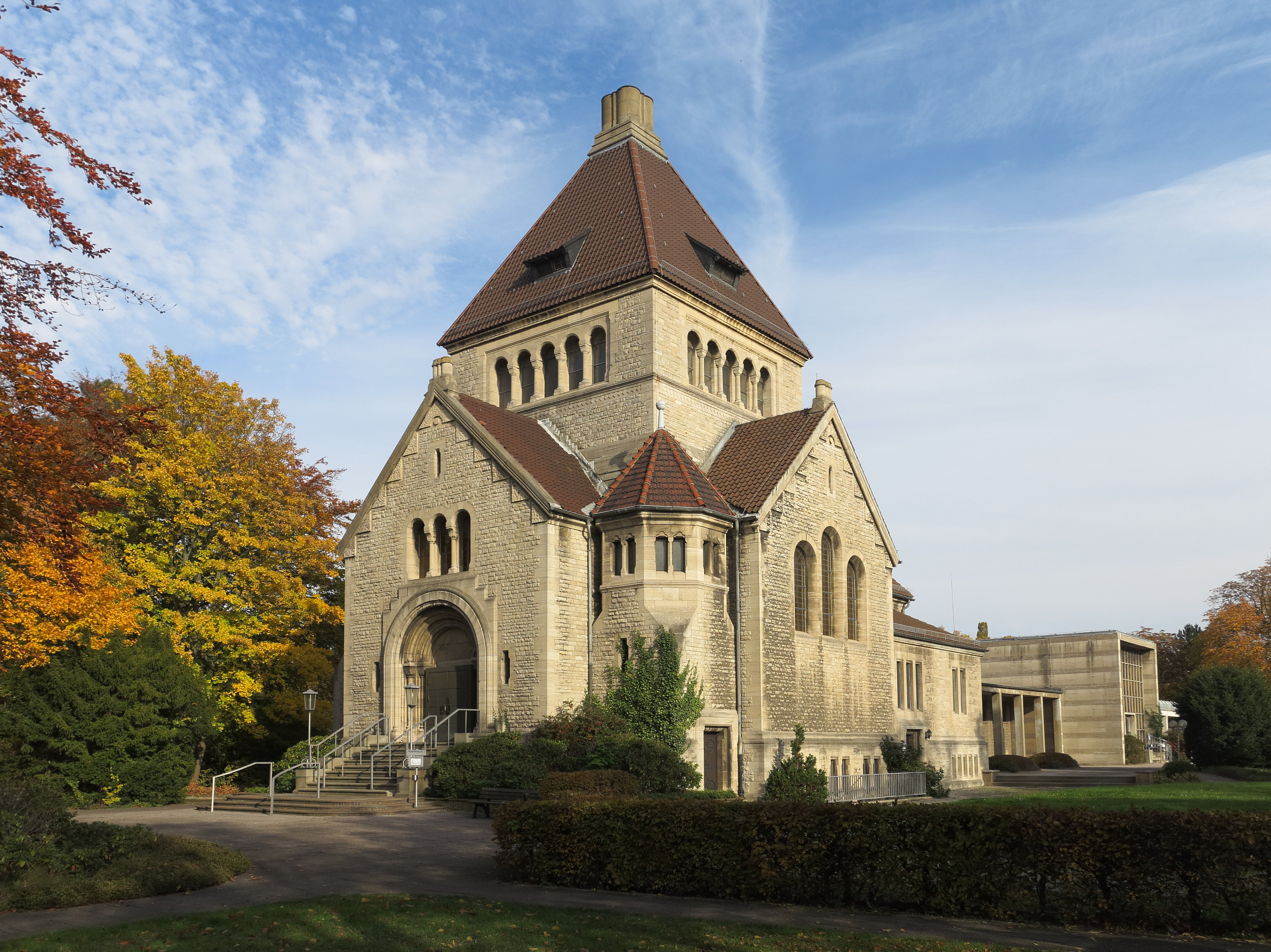
Ceremony Hall of crematorium

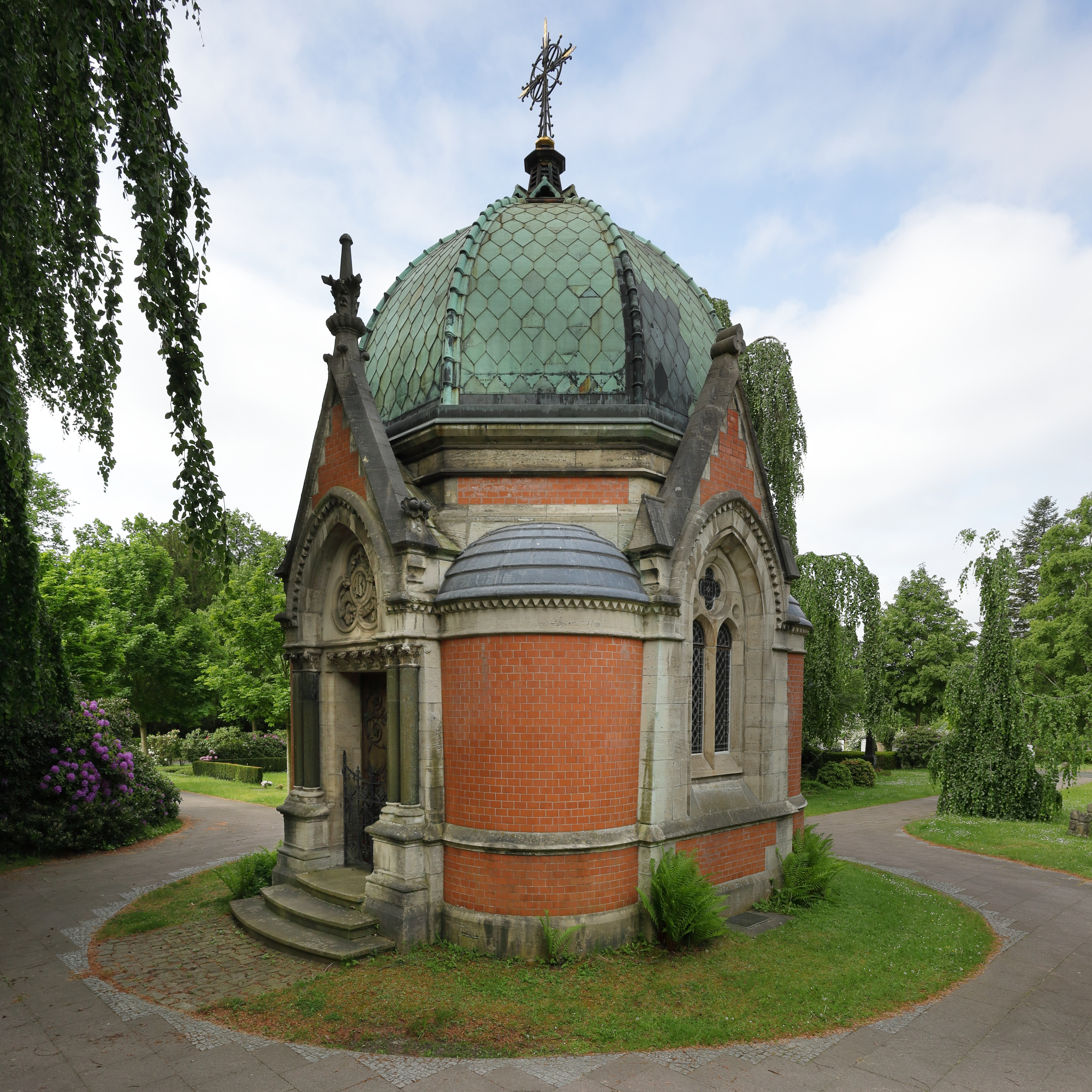
Bautler mausoleum built in 1891

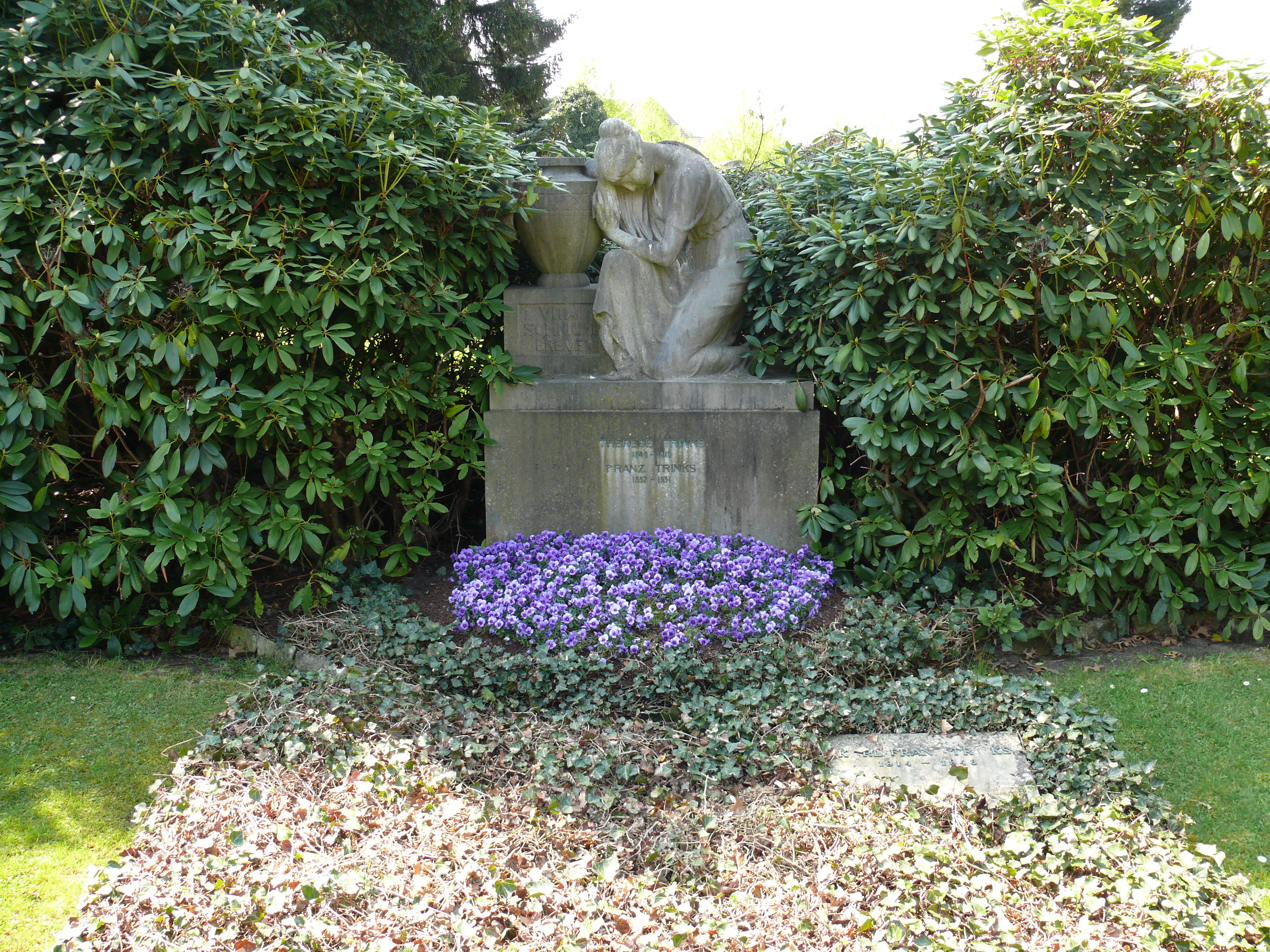

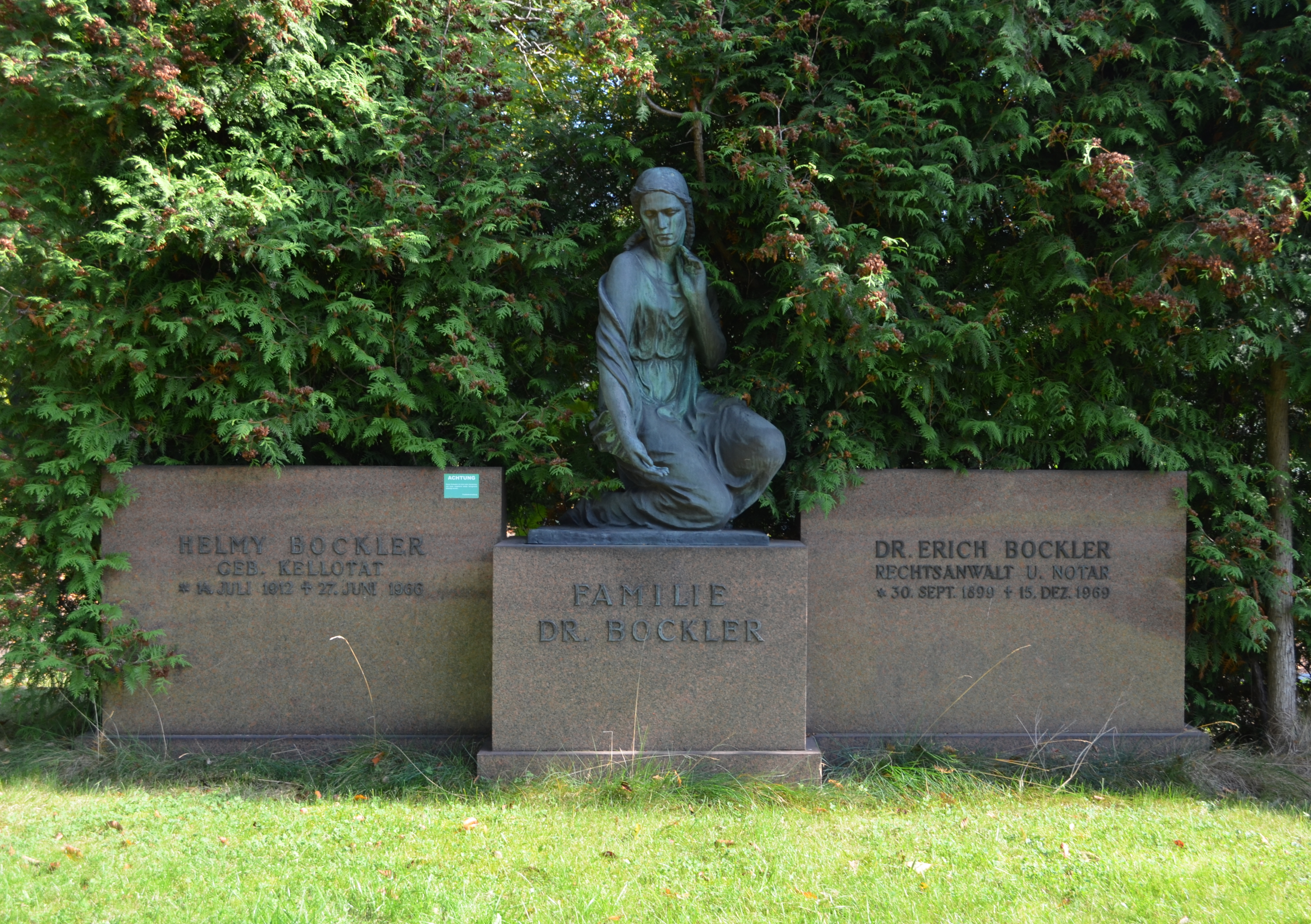

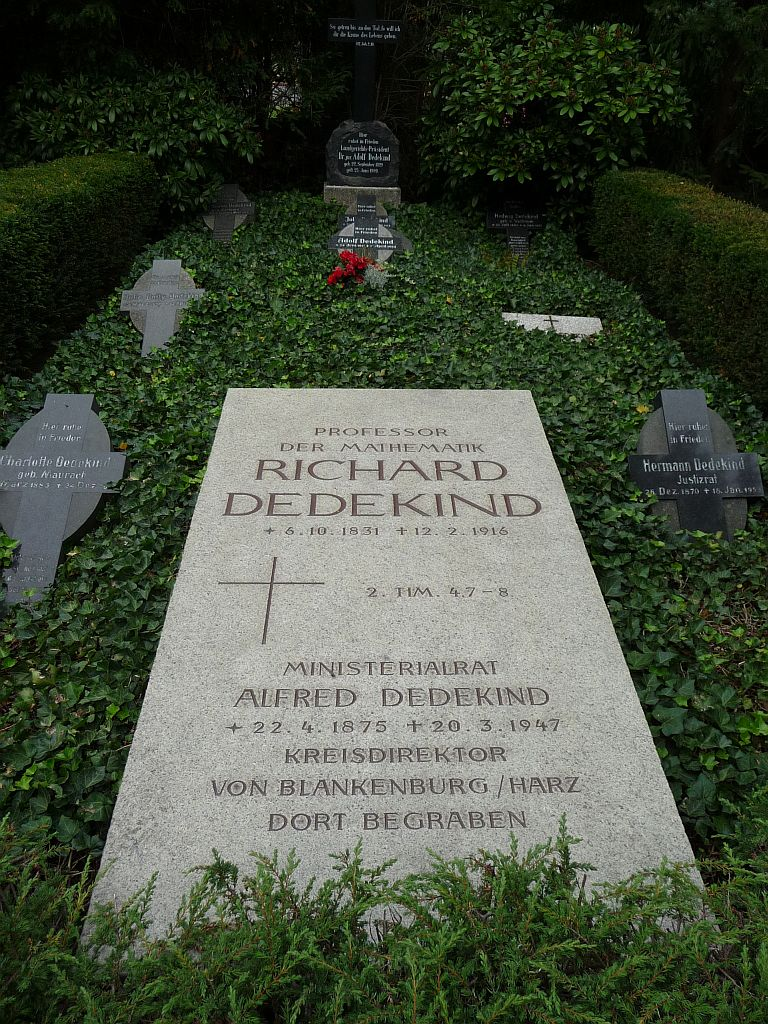
Richard Dedekind burial site

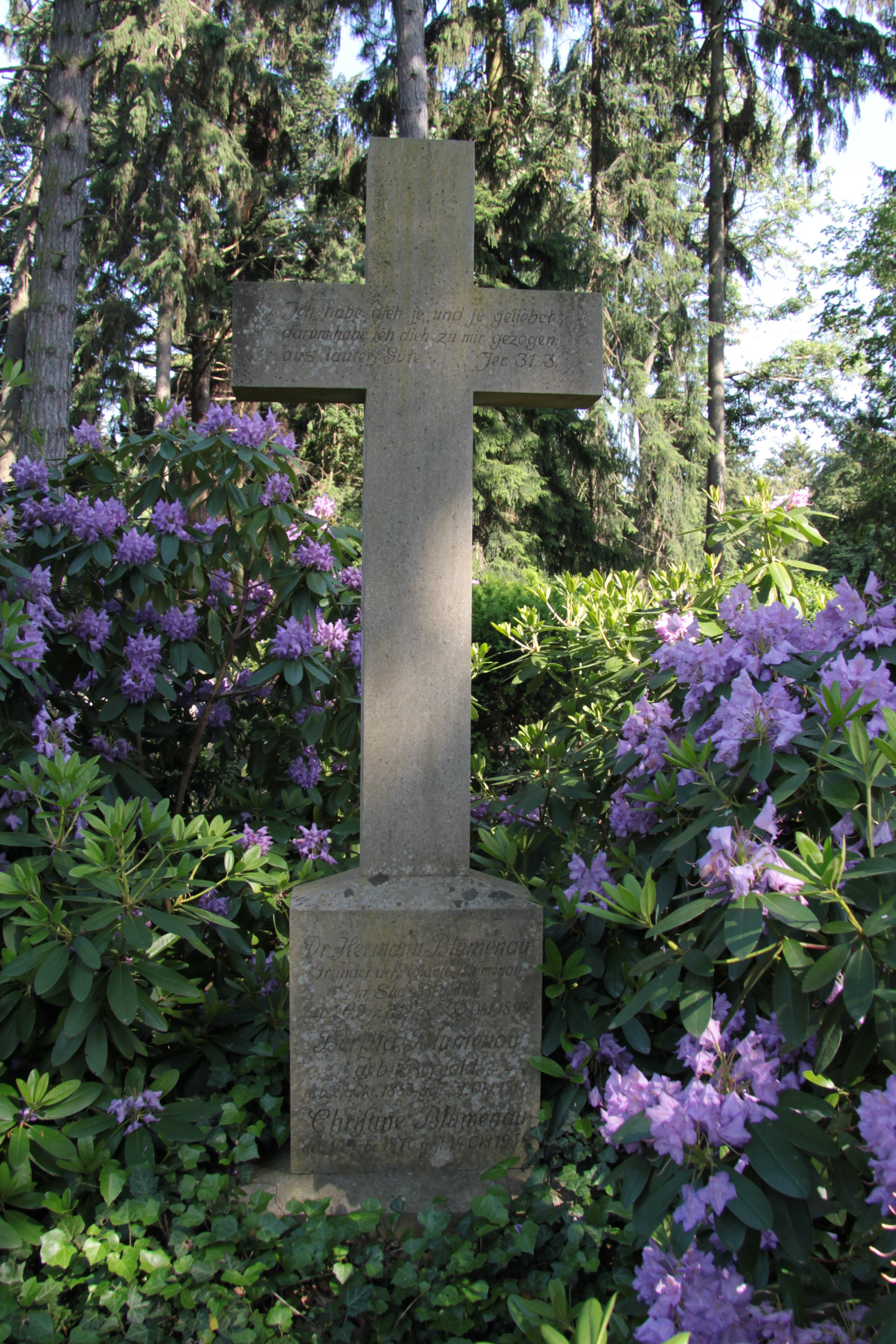
Tomb of Hermann Blumenau

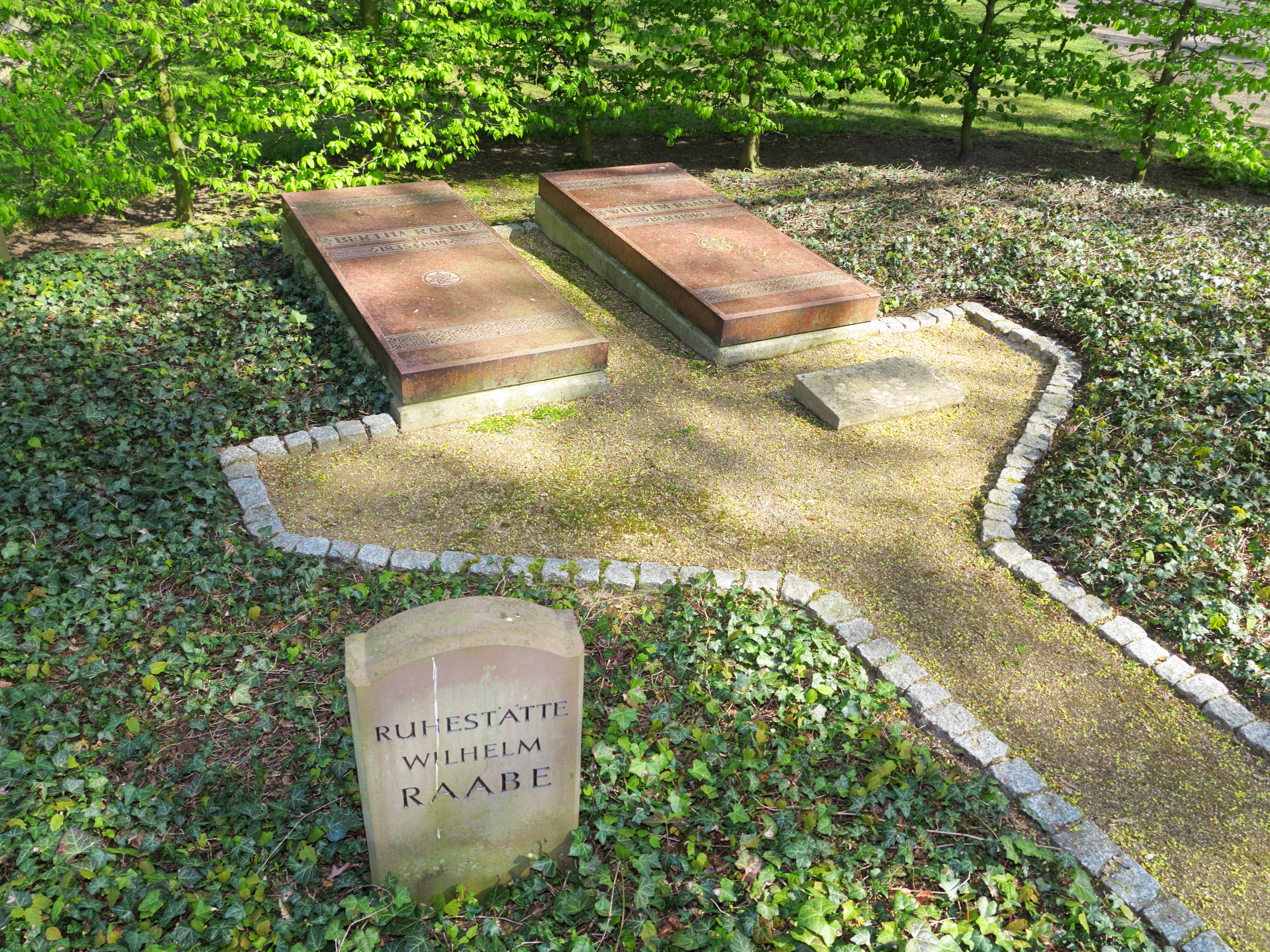
Wilhelm Raabe's resting place

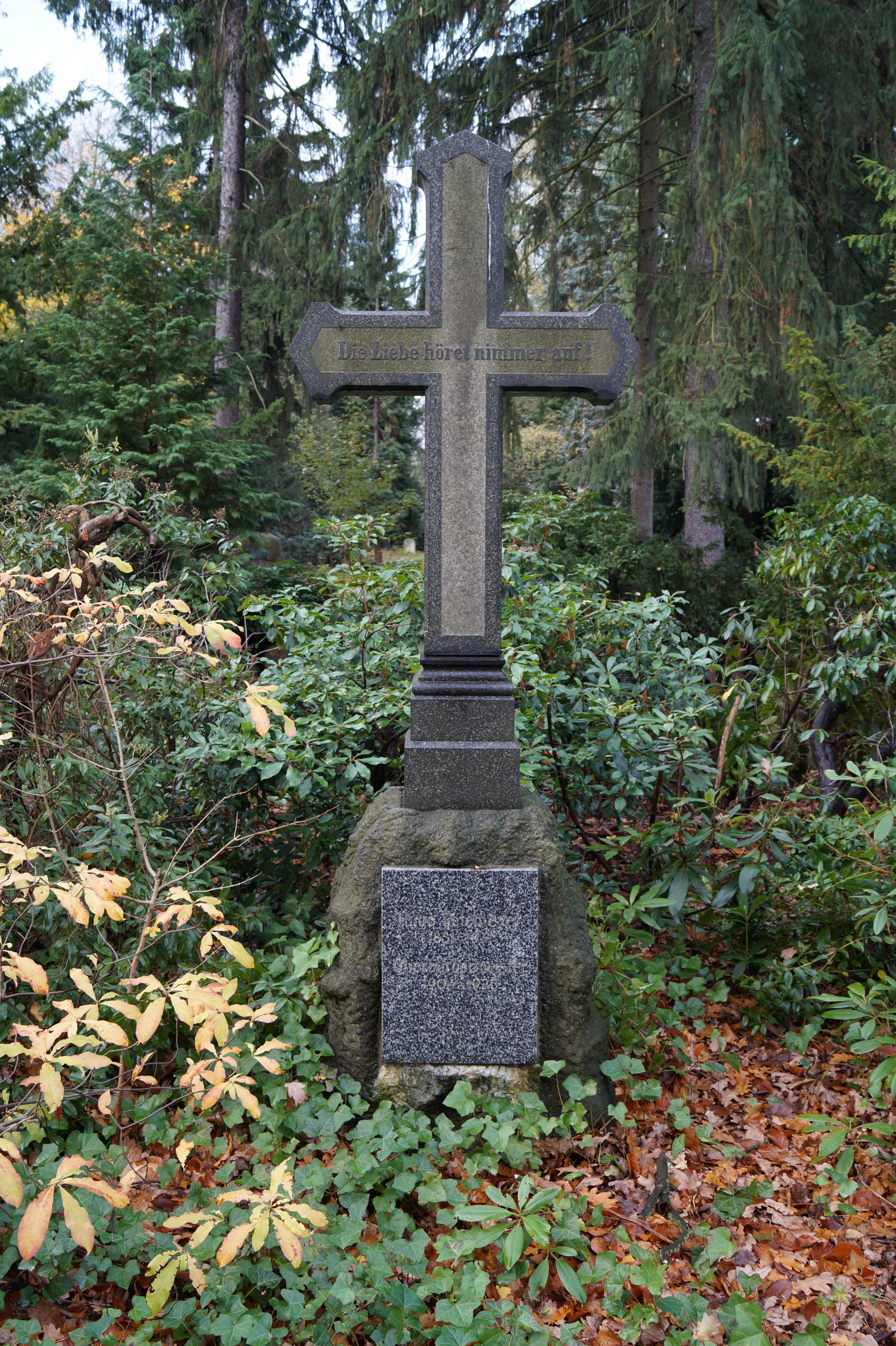
