= Ludwig Hess (composer) =

German composer (1877–1944)

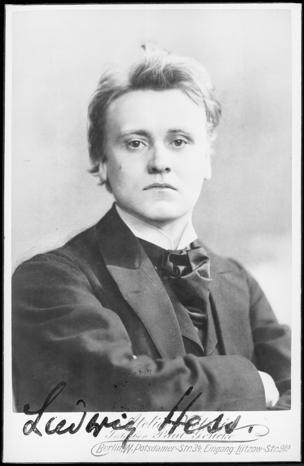
Portrait of Ludwig Hess

Ludwig Hess (23 March 1877, Marburg an der Lahn – 5 February 1944, Berlin) was a German composer, and conductor.

== Early life and career ==
Hess published his first compositions, a collection of Lieder, at the age of twenty. From 1907 to 1910 he was conductor of the Munich Concert Society, succeeding Felix Mottl. He gave a successful tour of America in 1911, performing songs by Hugo Wolf and Franz Schubert. He then conducted a choral society in Königsberg.

== Later career ==
Hess was appointed as a professor at the Akademie für Kirchen- und Schulmusik in 1924, a position he held until 1934. In the 1930s, his operas became more widely performed, with Trianon oder Das Hausgespenst (after Plautus) and Was ihr wollt (after Shakespeare) receiving premieres in 1937 and 1941, respectively. Hess died in 1944 in Berlin.

== Selected works ==
=== Stage works ===
Abu und Nu, opera. Libretto by the composer. Premiere 1919, Danzig.

Vor Edens Pforte. Opera after Lord Byron.

Trianon, oder Das Hausgespenst. Comic opera after Plautus. Libretto by Eberhard König. Premiere 21 March 1937, Bonn.

Weihnachtsidyll, cantata op. 86 (1937)

Was ihr wollt, comic opera after Shakespeare. Libretto by the composer. Premiere 30 March 1941, Stettin.

=== Chamber works ===
S' ist Mitternacht. Ballade for female speaker and piano, op. 31. Text by Friedrich Hebbel.

To the Ideal, op. 39

2 Moods, op. 42
