= Margarethe Arndt-Ober =

German opera singer

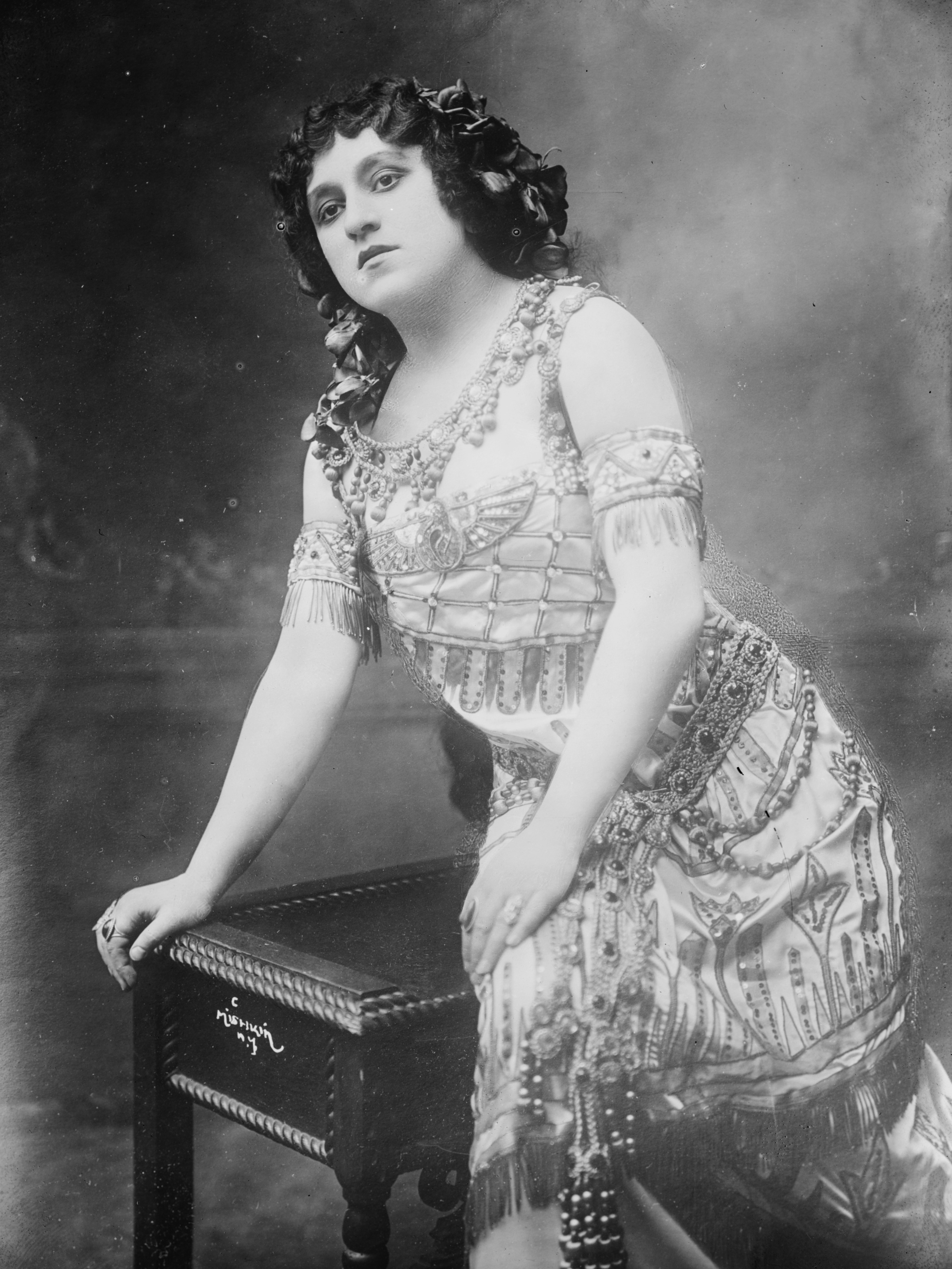
- Arndt-Ober as Amneris.
- Born: April 15, 1885; Berlin, Germany
- Died: March 17, 1971 (aged 85); Bad Sachsa, Germany
- Occupation: Opera singer
- Years active: 1906–1944

Margarethe Arndt-Ober (April 15, 1885 – March 17, 1971) was a German opera singer who had an active international career during the first half of the twentieth century. A highly skilled contralto, Ober enjoyed a particularly long and fruitful association with the Berlin State Opera from 1907 to 1944. She also was notably a principal singer at the Metropolitan Opera in New York City between 1913 and 1917.

== Biography ==
Ober was born in Berlin, Germany on April 15, 1885. A native of Berlin, Margarethe Ober studied singing in Berlin with Benno Stolzenberg and Arthur Arndt, the latter of whom she eventually married in 1910.

Ober made her professional opera debut as Azucena in Giuseppe Verdi's Il trovatore at the Opern- und Schauspielhaus Frankfurt in 1906. After a short stint at the opera in Stettin, she became a principal singer with the Berlin State Opera in 1907, remaining with that company for over 35 years. In 1908 she had her first major success in Berlin singing Amneris in Verdi's Aida with Enrico Caruso as Radames. That same year she portrayed the title role in the German premiere of Jules Massenet's Thérèse. In April 1910 she sang in the world premiere of Arthur Nevin's Poia. In 1913 she portrayed Eboli in the Berlin premiere of Verdi's Don Carlos.

In 1913 Ober joined the roster of principal singers at the Metropolitan Opera in New York City, singing with the company for four seasons. She made her debut with the company on November 21, 1913, as Ortrud in Richard Wagner's Lohengrin. With the company she notably sang Octavian in the United States premiere of Richard Strauss's Der Rosenkavalier, Katharine in the Met's first production of Hermann Goetz's Der Widerspänstigen Zähmung, and Alisoun in the world premiere of Reginald de Koven's The Canterbury Pilgrims. Her other Met roles included Amneris, Azucena, Brangäne in Wagner's Tristan und Isolde, Dalila in Camille Saint-Saëns's Samson et Dalila, Eglantine in Carl Maria von Weber's Euryanthe, Erda in both Wagner's Das Rheingold and Siegfried, Fricka in Wagner's Die Walküre, Laura in Amilcare Ponchielli's La Gioconda, Nancy in Friedrich von Flotow's Martha, Waltraute in Wagner's Götterdämmerung, and the Witch in Engelbert Humperdinck's Königskinder. Her final and 182nd performance at the Met was as Marina in Modest Mussorgsky's Boris Godunov on April 27, 1917. On May 8, 1917, Ober performed in a benefit concert for the composer Eugen Haile.

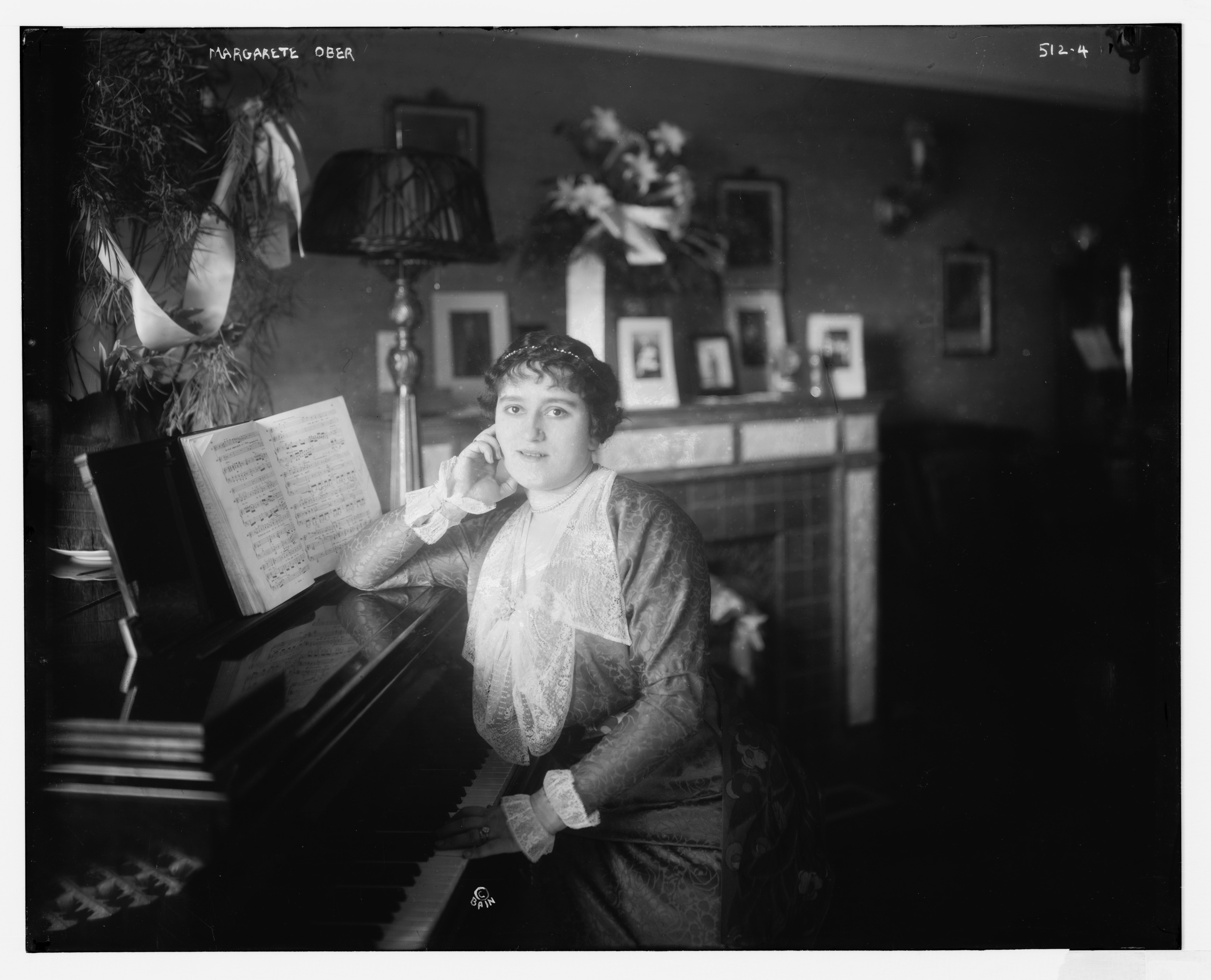
Arndt-Ober sat in front of her piano

With news of an imminent declaration of war against Germany circulating among audience members at the April 2, 1917, performance of The Canterbury Pilgrims, spontaneous displays of American patriotism briefly interrupted the performance. Shortly after the opera had resumed, Ober dramatically fainted on stage within full view of the audience. On November 2, 1917, a few days before the opening of the 1917–18 season, the Met cancelled the contracts of several of its German artists, including Ober, citing its right to cancellation reserved for events such as war. Ober sued for $50,000 for breach of contract (equivalent to $1,200,000 in 2024), maintaining she was "simply an artist." She lost her case, but nevertheless was detained in America until the end of the war.

Ober returned to Germany in 1919 and resumed her career at the Berlin State Opera until her retirement from the stage in 1944. In 1924 she portrayed Kostelnicka in the Berlin premiere of Leoš Janáček’s Jenůfa, and on 11 May 1925 she sang in the Berlin premiere of Der Ferne Klang by Franz Schrecker, alongside the composer's wife, Maria, and Richard Tauber, conducted by Erich Kleiber. Other Berlin highlights included appearances in three more world premieres: Eduard Künneke's operetta Die große Sünderin (31 December 1935), and the operas Der singende Teufel by Franz Schreker (December 10, 1928) and Peer Gynt by Werner Egk (November 24, 1938).

Outside of Berlin, Ober was a regular performer at the Zoppot Festival, appearing there almost every year from 1922 to 1942. She also made appearances in Spain, the Netherlands, and Norway, and at most of Germany's major opera houses. Her voice is preserved on a number of recordings made on the HMV, Odeon, Parlophon, Pathé, and Victor labels.

Since 1931, she was a member of the Nazi Party and she was also member of the Militant League for German Culture. She died in 1971 in Bad Sachsa, Germany.
