= Rübezahl und der Sackpfeifer von Neisse =

1904 opera by Hans Sommer

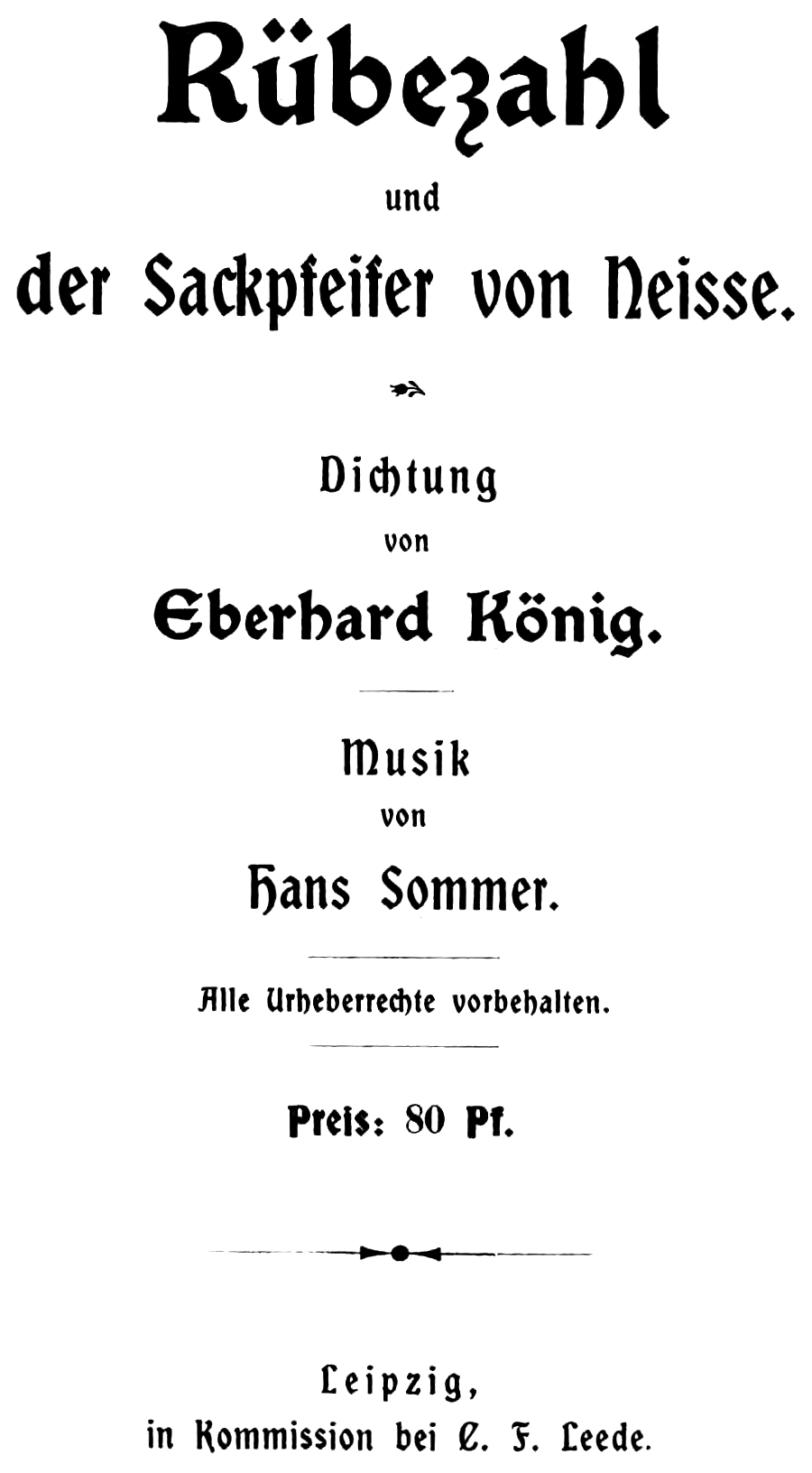
Title page of the libretto

Rübezahl und der Sackpfeifer von Neisse (Rübezahl and the Bagpiper from Neisse), Op. 36, is a 1904 opera in 4 acts by Hans Sommer to a libretto by Eberhard König based on the Rübezahl fairy tale. The opera premiered at the Hoftheater in Braunschweig on 15 April 1904.

== Recording ==
- Rübezahl und der Sackpfeifer von Neisse – Magnus Piontek, Johannes Beck, Anne Preuß, Jueun Jeon; opera chorus of Theater & Philharmonie Thüringen, Philharmonisches Orchester Altenburg-Gera, Theater Altenburg Gera, Laurent Wagner PAN 2016
