= Hermann Blumenau =

German pharmacist, founder of the city of Blumenau, Brazil (1819–1899)

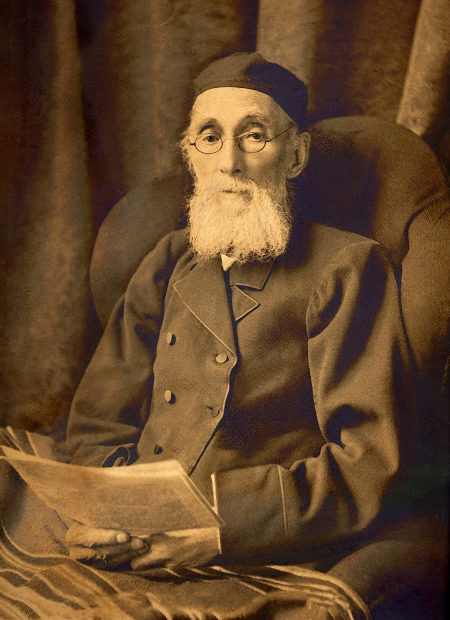
- Hermann Blumenau, c. 1899
- Born: Hermann Bruno Otto Blumenau; 26 December 1819; Hasselfelde, Duchy of Brunswick
- Died: 30 October 1899 (aged 79); Braunschweig, Germany
- Occupation: pharmacist
- Known for: founder of Blumenau, Brazil

Hermann Bruno Otto Blumenau (German pronunciation: [ˈhɛʁman ˈbʁuːno ˈɔto ˈbluːmənaʊ̯]; 26 December 1819 – 30 October 1899) was a German pharmacist who founded the city of Blumenau, situated in the Itajaí-Açu river valley in the state of Santa Catarina, Brazil.

== Biography ==
Blumenau was a son of a forest administrator, born in Hasselfelde, Duchy of Brunswick (in present-day Saxony-Anhalt). Between 1832 and 1836 he attended the secondary school in Braunschweig, but left school to become a pharmacist. From 1840 to 1841 he worked in a pharmacy in Hasselfelde. He later worked in a pharmacy in Erfurt, where he met Alexander Humboldt and Justus von Liebig. Soon after, Blumenau visited London with the Consul-General of Brazil, Johann Jakob Sturz, and decided to emigrate.

He studied chemistry at the University of Erlangen from 1844 until 1846, when he received his doctorate. Between 1846 and 1848 he travelled in southern Brazil for the Hamburg colonial society. He claimed about 200 km² of forest in the province of Santa Catarina. After two years in Germany, he returned to Brazil in 1850 with 17 German colonists and established the colony Blumenau. After the Brazilian government took control of the growing village in 1860, he remained as the first official director.

Blumenau founded schools and hospitals in his growing city, and by 1880 its population totaled approximately 15,000 people, most of whom were Germans. This population has managed to preserve its German heritage and, even today, German schools still prevail.

In 1884, Blumenau returned to Braunschweig, Germany, with his wife (whom he had married in 1867) and their three sons. He died on 30 October 1899, in Braunschweig. His body rests at Braunschweig Main Cemetery.
