= Hans Sommer (composer) =

German composer and mathematician

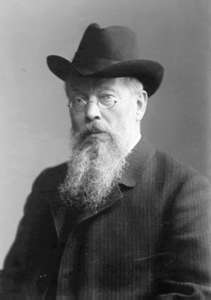
Hans Sommer

Hans Sommer (born 20 July 1837 in Braunschweig (Brunswick) – 26 April 1922 in Braunschweig) was a German composer and mathematician.

Sommer was born Hans Friedrich August Zincke in Braunschweig in 1837.

Before going into music full-time, Sommer, who had studied mathematics and physics in Braunschweig and Göttingen, was also a noted mathematician. He served as the director of the Braunschweig University of Technology, where he taught mathematics, from 1875 to 1881.

He was most successful as a composer for the theatre. Several of his operas used librettos based on fairy tales and were first produced at Brunswick: Der Nachtwächter (1865), Loreley (1891), Rübezahl und der Sackpfeifer von Neisse (1904), Riquet mit dem Schopf (1907) and Der Waldschratt (1912).Saint Foix, a one-act opera, was given at Munich in 1894 and Der Meermann at Weimar in 1896; Der Vetter aus Bremen (1865), Augustin (1898) and Münchhausen (1896–8) were not performed. His incidental music to Hans von Wolzogen's Das Schloss der Herzen (1891) was first performed in 1897 in Berlin, in concert form. He placed great importance on the literary quality of his librettos, and corresponded with numerous librettists and composers. His many songs, at one time known in England, include the cycles Der Rattenfänger von Hameln, Der wilde Jäger and Sapphos Gesänge; he also wrote orchestral works and male-voice choruses.

Sommer was active in initiating the institution of composer's performance rights and was instrumental in recruiting Richard Strauss to that cause.

== Selected works ==
=== Lieder ===
- Fünf Lieder op. 1 (1872/1873), Litolff Braunschweig 1876
- Hunold Singuf (33 Rattenfängerlieder, J. Wolff) op. 4 (1882), Litolff Braunschweig 1884
- Sapphos Gesänge (C. Sylva) op. 6 (1883/1884), Litolff Braunschweig 1884 [auch orchestriert 1884/1885, Universal Edition 2010]
- Sechs Balladen und Romanzen op. 8 (1885), Litolff Braunschweig 1886
- Zehn Lieder (J. Eichendorff) op. 9 (komp. etwa 1885), Litolff Braunschweig 1886
- Sieben Balladen und Romanzen op. 11 (1886), Litolff Braunschweig 1886
- Sieben Lieder (G. Keller) op. 16 (1891), Leede Leipzig 1892
- Eliland (K. Stieler) op. 33 (1891/1892), Litolff Braunschweig 1900
- Fünf Brettl-Lieder op. 34 (1895/1901), Leede Leipzig 1901
- 21 Lieder (J. W. Goethe), o. op. (1919–1922), in Teilen veröffentlicht, Litolff Braunschweig 1932/1937 [20 Lieder orchestriert, in Teilen veröffentlicht 2003/2010 (Universal Edition)]

=== Operas ===
- Der Nachtwächter (E. T. Neckniz/Pseudonym des Komponisten, nach Theodor Körner), Operette 1 Akt, o. op., UA Braunschweig 1865, nicht gedruckt
- Der Vetter aus Bremen (E. T. Neckniz/Pseudonym des Komponisten, nach Theodor Körner), Operette 1 Akt, o. op., nicht gedruckt
- Lorelei (Gustav Gurski) Bühnenspiel 3 Akte, op. 13, UA Braunschweig 1891, Leede Leipzig 1889
- Saint Foix (Hans von Wolzogen) heiteres Bühnenspiel 1 Akt, op. 20, UA München 1894, Leede Leipzig 1893
- Der Meermann (ders.) nordische Legende 1 Akt, op. 28, UA Weimar 1896, Leede Leipzig 1895
- Münchhausen (ders. mit Ferdinand Graf Sporck und Hans Sommer), Ein Schelmenstück 3 Akte, op. 31, Leede Leipzig 1897
- Augustin (Hans von Wolzogen), Fasnachtspiel 1 Akt, op. 32, Leede Leipzig 1899
- Rübezahl und der Sackpfeifer von Neisse (Eberhard König), Dichtung und Musik 4 Akte, op. 36, UA Braunschweig 1904, Leede Leipzig 1904
- Riquet mit dem Schopf (ders.), Märchenspiel 3 Akte, op. 38, UA Braunschweig 1907, Leede Leipzig 1907
- Der Waldschratt (ders.), Spiel 3 Akte, op. 42, UA Braunschweig 1912, Leede Leipzig 1910

=== Chamber music ===
- Klaviertrio d-Moll o. op. (komp. 1858)
- Klavierquartett g-Moll o. op. (komp. 1870/2. Fass. 1884)
- Klaviertrio Es-Dur o. op. (komp. 1884)

== Sources ==
- J.A. Fuller Maitland/Bernd Wiechert. The New Grove Dictionary of Opera, edited by Stanley Sadie (1992), ISBN 0-333-73432-7 and ISBN 1-56159-228-5
