= Käthe Buchler =

German artist

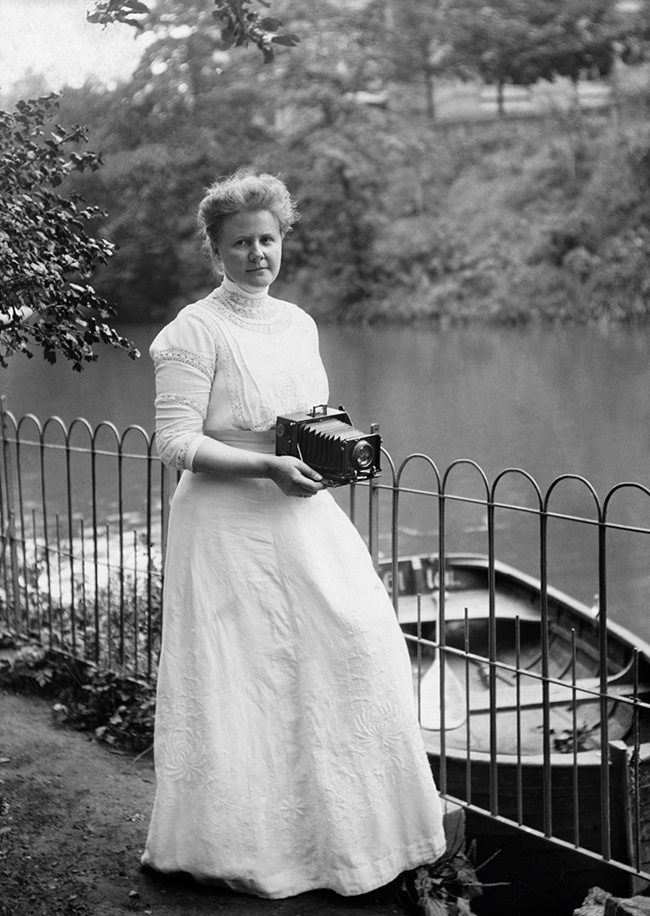
- self-portrait, c. 1905
- Born: Katharina von Rhamm; 11 October 1876; Braunschweig, Germany
- Died: 14 September 1930 (aged 53); Braunschweig, Germany
- Other names: Katharina Buchler
- Known for: Photography
- Spouse: Walther Buchler

Käthe Buchler (1876–1930) was a German photographer.

== Biography ==
Buchler née von Rhamm was born on 11 October 1876 in Braunschweig, Germany. A self-taught photographer, her husband gave Buchler her first camera (a binocular Voigtländer) in 1901. During World War I Buchler recorded daily life in Braunschweig including war efforts, orphaned children, and wounded soldiers. Buchler worked mainly with black and white film but also experimented with the new Autochrome process.

Buchler died on 14 September 1930 in Brunswick. In 2003 the archive of 1,000 black and white prints and 175 color autochrome plates was donated to the Museum für Photographie (Braunschweig) (Museum of Photography Braunschweig). In 2017 and 2018 an exhibition of Buchler's work Beyond the Battlefields:Käthe Buchler’s Photographs of Germany in the Great War was shown at the University of Hertfordshire and the University of Birmingham.

== Gallery ==
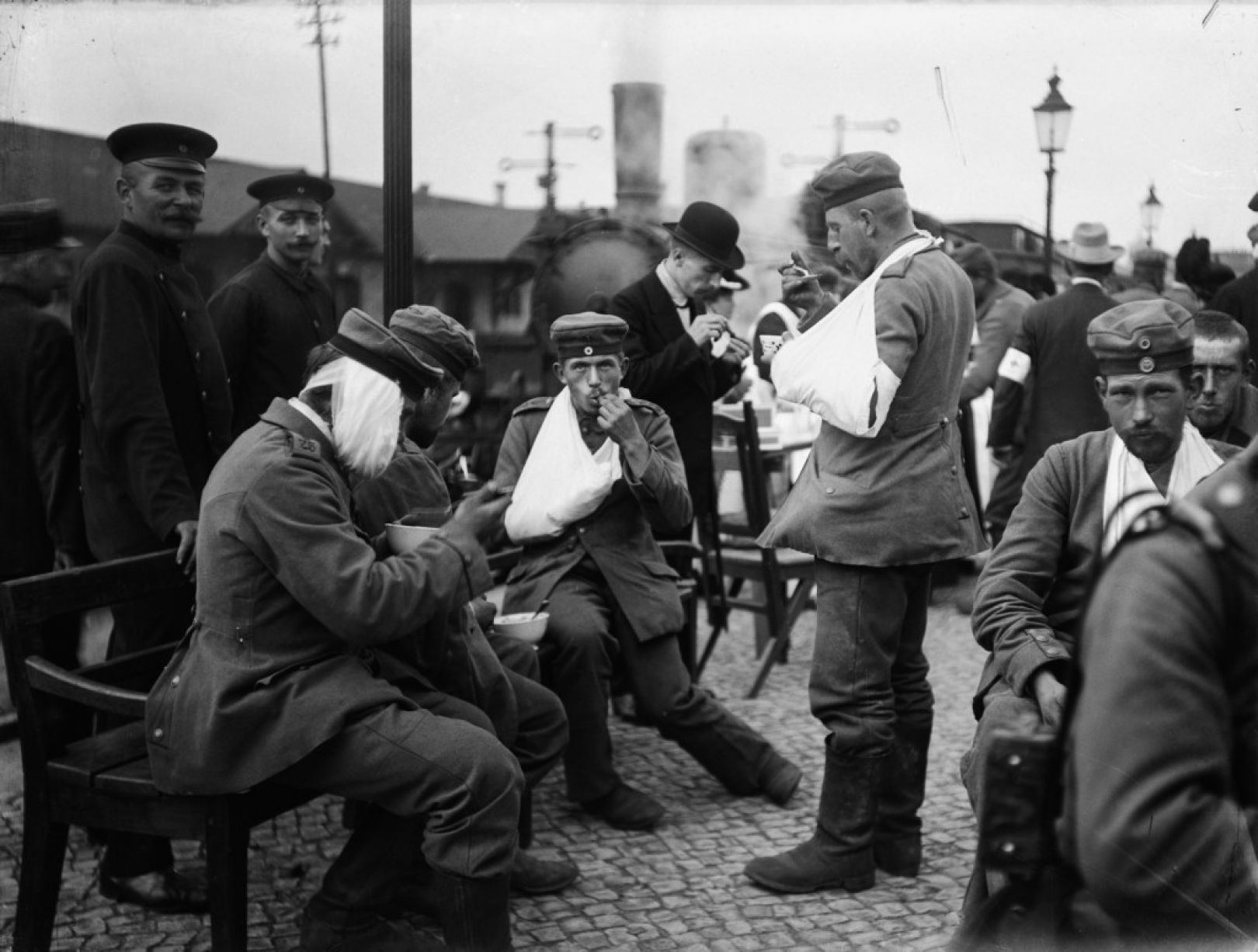
Braunschweig in World War I

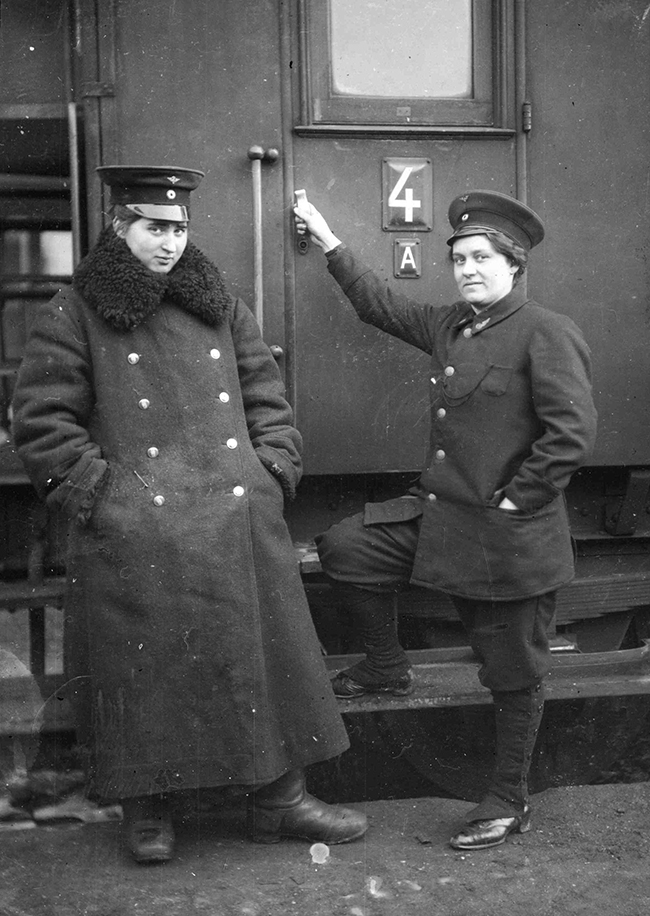
Women train conductors in Braunschweig

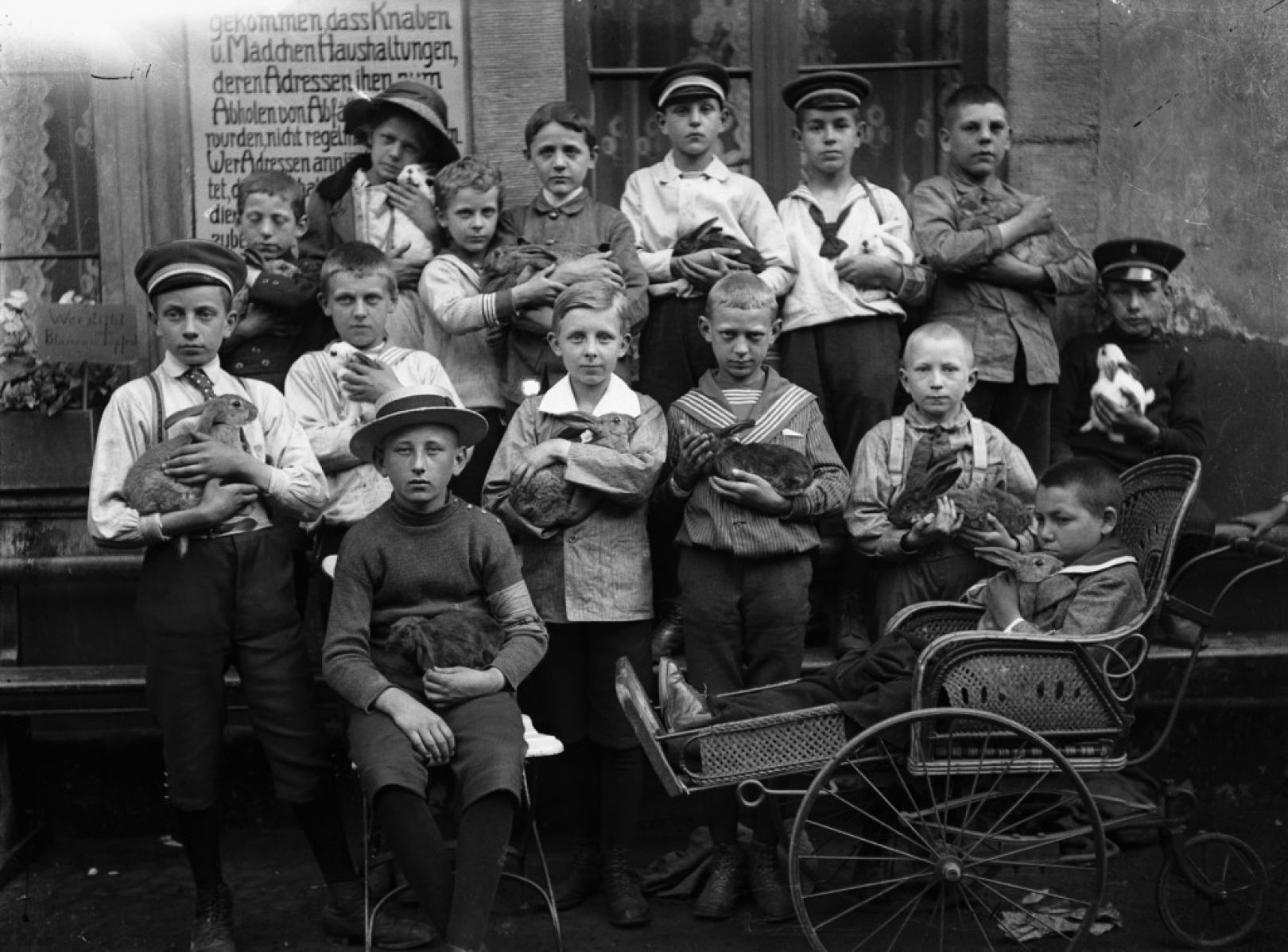
Braunschweig in World War I

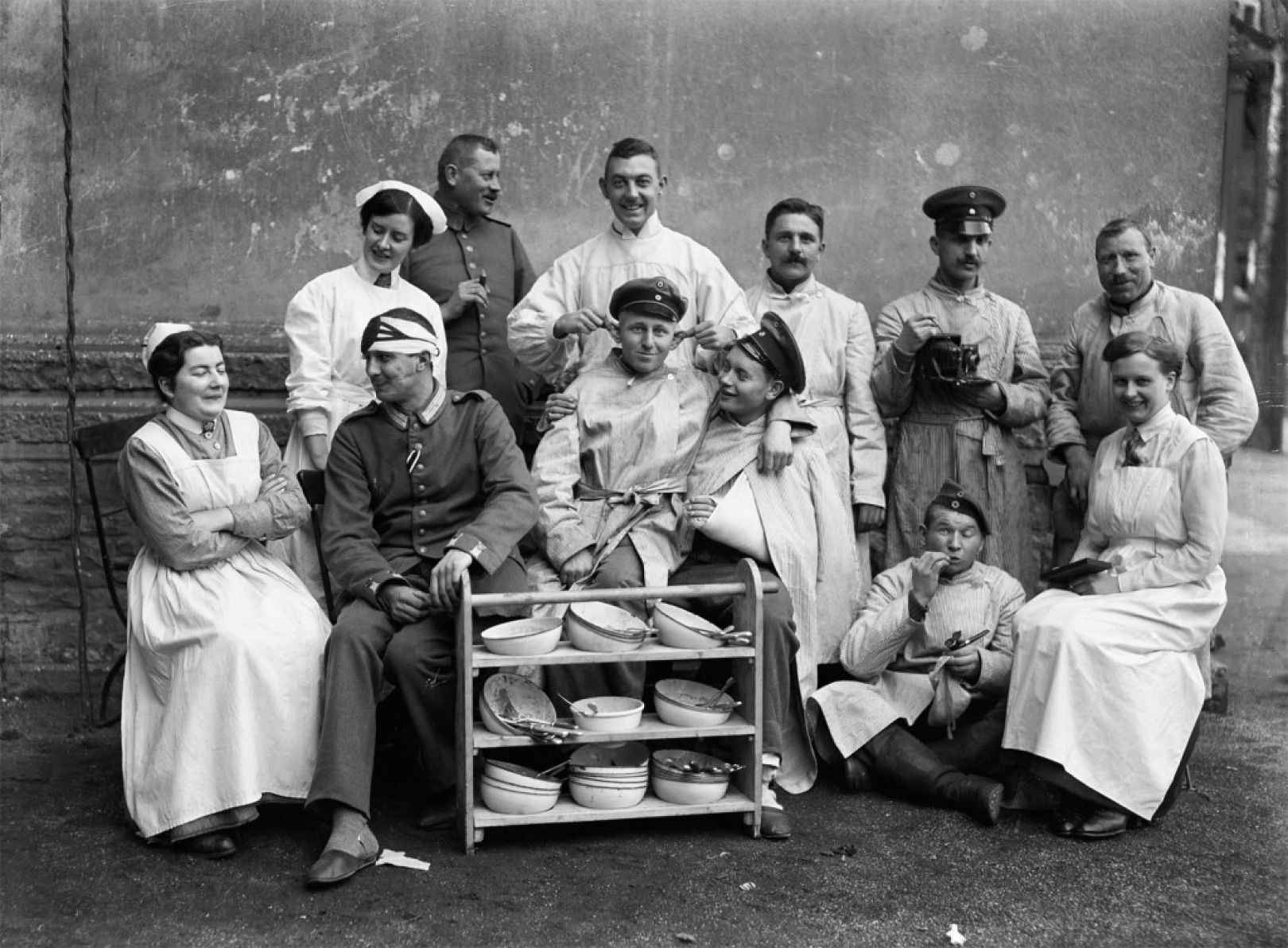
Braunschweig in World War I
