= Walter Dexel =

German designer, painter and graphic designer (1890–1973)

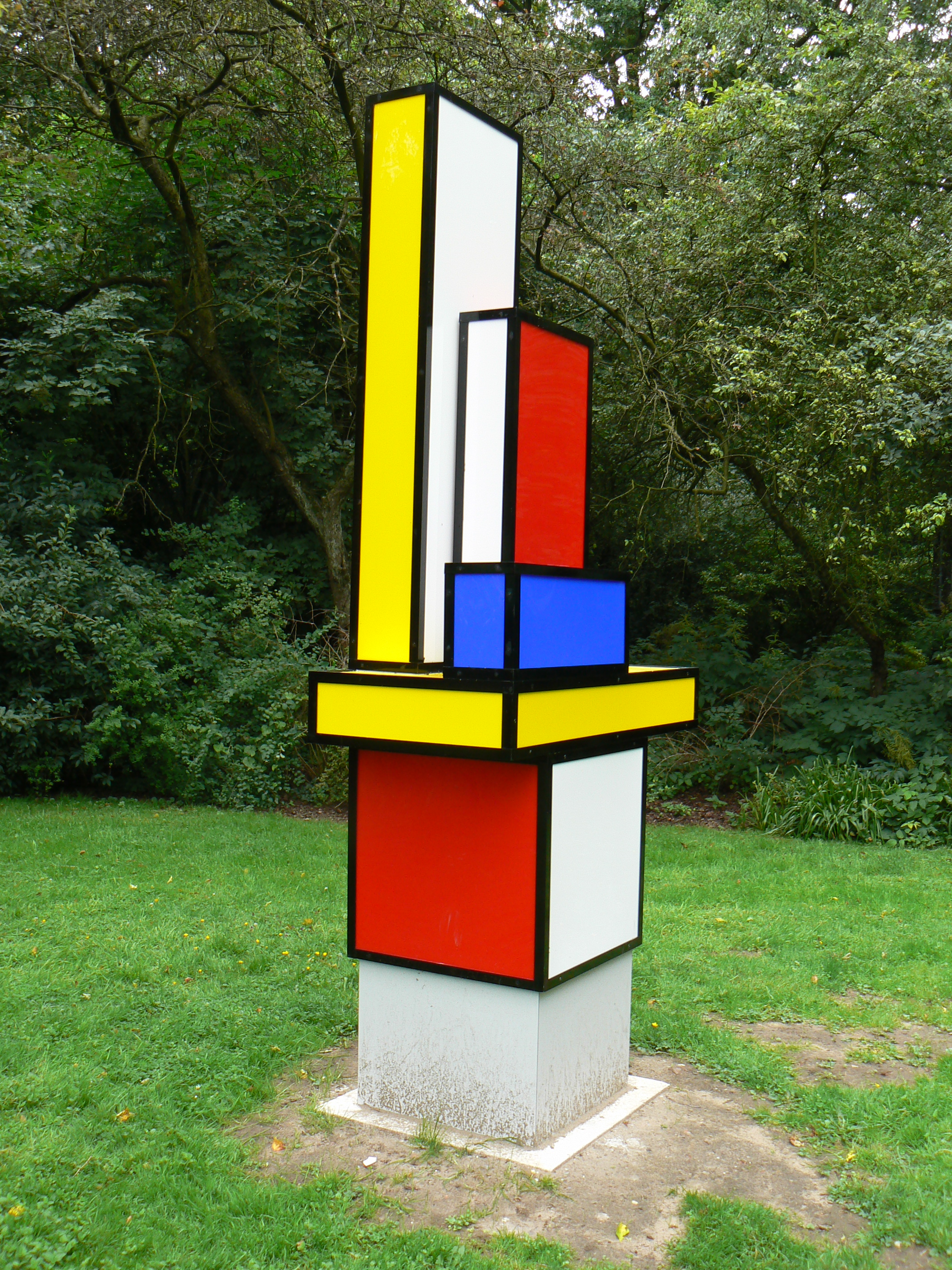
Lightsculpture (since 2008) by Walter Dexel in sculpture park at Quadrat Bottrop in Bottrop/Germany

Walter Dexel (born 7 February 1890 in Munich, died 8 June 1973 in Braunschweig) was a German painter, commercial graphic designer, and transportation planner. He also functioned as an art historian and directed a museum in Braunschweig during the Second World War.
