= Eberhard König =

Silesian German writer and dramatist

- Born: 18 June 1871; Zielona Góra, German Empire
- Died: 26 December 1949 (aged 78); Berlin, Germany
- Occupation: Writer
- Writing career
- Language: German

Eberhard König (Grünberg 18 June 1871 - Berlin 26 December 1949) was a Silesian German writer and dramatist.

== Works ==
- Libretto for the opera Rübezahl und der Sackpfeifer von Neisse by Hans Sommer 1904
