= Hanau (electoral district) =

Federal electoral district of Germany

179 Hanau
- Electoral district for the Bundestag
- Hanau in 2025
- State: Hesse
- Population: 262,000 (2019)
- Electorate: 176,271 (2021)
- Major settlements: Hanau; Maintal; Nidderau
- Area: 346.2 km^{2}

Current electoral district
- Created: 1949
- Party: CDU
- Member: Pascal Reddig
- Elected: 2025

Hanau is an electoral constituency (German: Wahlkreis) represented in the Bundestag. It elects one member via first-past-the-post voting. Under the current constituency numbering system, it is designated as constituency 179. It is located in southern Hesse, comprising the western part of Main-Kinzig-Kreis, including the city of Hanau.

Hanau was created for the inaugural 1949 federal election. From 2021 to 2025, it was represented by Lennard Oehl of the Social Democratic Party (SPD). Since 2025 it has been represented by Pascal Reddig of the CDU.

== Geography ==
Hanau is located in southern Hesse. As of the 2021 federal election, it comprises the municipalities of Bruchköbel, Erlensee, Großkrotzenburg, Hammersbach, Hanau, Hasselroth, Langenselbold, Maintal, Neuberg, Nidderau, Niederdorfelden, Rodenbach, Ronneburg, and Schöneck from the Main-Kinzig-Kreis district.

== History ==
Hanau was created in 1949. In the 1949 election, it was Hesse constituency 14 in the numbering system. From 1953 through 1976, it was number 139. From 1980 through 1998, it was number 137. In the 2002 and 2005 elections, it was number 181. In the 2009 through 2021 elections, it was number 180. From the 2025 election, it has been number 179.

Originally, the constituency comprised the independent city of Hanau and the districts of Landkreis Hanau and Gelnhausen. In the 1980 through 2009 elections, it comprised the municipalities of Bad Orb, Biebergemünd, Bruchköbel, Erlensee, Flörsbachtal, Freigericht, Gelnhausen, Großkrotzenburg, Gründau, Hammersbach, Hanau, Hasselroth, Jossgrund, Langenselbold, Linsengericht, Maintal, Neuberg, Nidderau, Niederdorfelden, Rodenbach, Ronneburg, Schöneck, and the Gutsbezirk Spessart area from the Main-Kinzig-Kreis district. It acquired its current borders in the 2013 election.

Election	No.	Name	Borders
1949	14	Hanau	Hanau city; Landkreis Hanau district; Gelnhausen district
1953	139	Hanau	Hanau city; Landkreis Hanau district; Gelnhausen district
1957	139	Hanau	Hanau city; Landkreis Hanau district; Gelnhausen district
1961	139	Hanau	Hanau city; Landkreis Hanau district; Gelnhausen district
1965	139	Hanau	Hanau city; Landkreis Hanau district; Gelnhausen district
1969	139	Hanau	Hanau city; Landkreis Hanau district; Gelnhausen district
1972	139	Hanau	Hanau city; Landkreis Hanau district; Gelnhausen district
1976	139	Hanau	Hanau city; Landkreis Hanau district; Gelnhausen district
1980	137	Hanau	Main-Kinzig-Kreis district (only Bad Orb, Biebergemünd, Bruchköbel, Erlensee, Flörsbachtal, Freigericht, Gelnhausen, Großkrotzenburg, Gründau, Hammersbach, Hanau, Hasselroth, Jossgrund, Langenselbold, Linsengericht, Maintal, Neuberg, Nidderau, Niederdorfelden, Rodenbach, Ronneburg, and Schöneck municipalities and the Gutsbezirk Spessart area)
1983	137	Hanau	Main-Kinzig-Kreis district (only Bad Orb, Biebergemünd, Bruchköbel, Erlensee, Flörsbachtal, Freigericht, Gelnhausen, Großkrotzenburg, Gründau, Hammersbach, Hanau, Hasselroth, Jossgrund, Langenselbold, Linsengericht, Maintal, Neuberg, Nidderau, Niederdorfelden, Rodenbach, Ronneburg, and Schöneck municipalities and the Gutsbezirk Spessart area)
1987	137	Hanau	Main-Kinzig-Kreis district (only Bad Orb, Biebergemünd, Bruchköbel, Erlensee, Flörsbachtal, Freigericht, Gelnhausen, Großkrotzenburg, Gründau, Hammersbach, Hanau, Hasselroth, Jossgrund, Langenselbold, Linsengericht, Maintal, Neuberg, Nidderau, Niederdorfelden, Rodenbach, Ronneburg, and Schöneck municipalities and the Gutsbezirk Spessart area)
1990	137	Hanau	Main-Kinzig-Kreis district (only Bad Orb, Biebergemünd, Bruchköbel, Erlensee, Flörsbachtal, Freigericht, Gelnhausen, Großkrotzenburg, Gründau, Hammersbach, Hanau, Hasselroth, Jossgrund, Langenselbold, Linsengericht, Maintal, Neuberg, Nidderau, Niederdorfelden, Rodenbach, Ronneburg, and Schöneck municipalities and the Gutsbezirk Spessart area)
1994	137	Hanau	Main-Kinzig-Kreis district (only Bad Orb, Biebergemünd, Bruchköbel, Erlensee, Flörsbachtal, Freigericht, Gelnhausen, Großkrotzenburg, Gründau, Hammersbach, Hanau, Hasselroth, Jossgrund, Langenselbold, Linsengericht, Maintal, Neuberg, Nidderau, Niederdorfelden, Rodenbach, Ronneburg, and Schöneck municipalities and the Gutsbezirk Spessart area)
1998	137	Hanau	Main-Kinzig-Kreis district (only Bad Orb, Biebergemünd, Bruchköbel, Erlensee, Flörsbachtal, Freigericht, Gelnhausen, Großkrotzenburg, Gründau, Hammersbach, Hanau, Hasselroth, Jossgrund, Langenselbold, Linsengericht, Maintal, Neuberg, Nidderau, Niederdorfelden, Rodenbach, Ronneburg, and Schöneck municipalities and the Gutsbezirk Spessart area)
2002	181	Hanau	Main-Kinzig-Kreis district (only Bad Orb, Biebergemünd, Bruchköbel, Erlensee, Flörsbachtal, Freigericht, Gelnhausen, Großkrotzenburg, Gründau, Hammersbach, Hanau, Hasselroth, Jossgrund, Langenselbold, Linsengericht, Maintal, Neuberg, Nidderau, Niederdorfelden, Rodenbach, Ronneburg, and Schöneck municipalities and the Gutsbezirk Spessart area)
2005	181	Hanau	Main-Kinzig-Kreis district (only Bad Orb, Biebergemünd, Bruchköbel, Erlensee, Flörsbachtal, Freigericht, Gelnhausen, Großkrotzenburg, Gründau, Hammersbach, Hanau, Hasselroth, Jossgrund, Langenselbold, Linsengericht, Maintal, Neuberg, Nidderau, Niederdorfelden, Rodenbach, Ronneburg, and Schöneck municipalities and the Gutsbezirk Spessart area)
2009	180	Hanau	Main-Kinzig-Kreis district (only Bad Orb, Biebergemünd, Bruchköbel, Erlensee, Flörsbachtal, Freigericht, Gelnhausen, Großkrotzenburg, Gründau, Hammersbach, Hanau, Hasselroth, Jossgrund, Langenselbold, Linsengericht, Maintal, Neuberg, Nidderau, Niederdorfelden, Rodenbach, Ronneburg, and Schöneck municipalities and the Gutsbezirk Spessart area)
2013	180	Hanau	Main-Kinzig-Kreis district (only Bruchköbel, Erlensee, Großkrotzenburg, Hammersbach, Hanau, Hasselroth, Langenselbold, Maintal, Neuberg, Nidderau, Niederdorfelden, Rodenbach, Ronneburg, and Schöneck municipalities)
2017	180	Hanau	Main-Kinzig-Kreis district (only Bruchköbel, Erlensee, Großkrotzenburg, Hammersbach, Hanau, Hasselroth, Langenselbold, Maintal, Neuberg, Nidderau, Niederdorfelden, Rodenbach, Ronneburg, and Schöneck municipalities)
2021	180	Hanau	Main-Kinzig-Kreis district (only Bruchköbel, Erlensee, Großkrotzenburg, Hammersbach, Hanau, Hasselroth, Langenselbold, Maintal, Neuberg, Nidderau, Niederdorfelden, Rodenbach, Ronneburg, and Schöneck municipalities)
2025	179	Hanau	Main-Kinzig-Kreis district (only Bruchköbel, Erlensee, Großkrotzenburg, Hammersbach, Hanau, Hasselroth, Langenselbold, Maintal, Neuberg, Nidderau, Niederdorfelden, Rodenbach, Ronneburg, and Schöneck municipalities)

== Members ==
The constituency was first represented by Jakob Altmaier of the Social Democratic Party (SPD) from 1949 to 1965. He was succeeded by fellow SPD member Gerhard Flämig, who served from 1965 to 1980. Bernd Reuter of the SPD then served a single term from 1980 to 1983. Richard Bayha of the Christian Democratic Union (CDU) was elected in 1983 and served until 1994, when he was succeeded by party fellow Manfred Kanther for a single term. Bernd Reuter won the constituency for the SPD in 1998 and served one term, followed by Sascha Raabe of the SPD for two terms. Peter Tauber of the CDU won it in 2009 and served a single term. Katja Leikert was elected in 2013 and re-elected in 2017. Lennard Oehl won the constituency for the SPD in 2021.

Election	Member	Party	%
1949	Jakob Altmaier	SPD	31.9
1953	Jakob Altmaier	SPD	35.6
1957	Jakob Altmaier	SPD	43.5
1961	Jakob Altmaier	SPD	45.2
1965	Gerhard Flämig	SPD	47.8
1969	Gerhard Flämig	SPD	51.6
1972	Gerhard Flämig	SPD	54.0
1976	Gerhard Flämig	SPD	47.2
1980	Bernd Reuter	SPD	49.1
1983	Richard Bayha	CDU	44.1
1987	Richard Bayha	CDU	45.9
1990	Richard Bayha	CDU	44.2
1994	Manfred Kanther	CDU	46.9
1998	Bernd Reuter	SPD	45.1
2002	Sascha Raabe	SPD	47.3
2005	Sascha Raabe	SPD	43.2
2009	Peter Tauber	CDU	39.4
2013	Katja Leikert	CDU	44.3
2017	Katja Leikert	CDU	35.3
2021	Lennard Oehl	SPD	31.1
2025	Pascal Reddig	CDU	32.0

== Election results ==
=== 2025 election ===
Federal election (2025): Hanau
Notes:	Blue background denotes the winner of the electorate vote. Pink background denotes a candidate elected from their party list. Yellow background denotes an electorate win by a list member, or other incumbent. A ✓ or ✗ denotes status of any incumbent, win or lose respectively.						
Party	Candidate	Votes	%	±%	Party votes	%	±%
CDU	Pascal Reddig	45,343	32.0	▲4.1	40,879	28.7	▲6.2
SPD	✗ Lennard Oehl	35,907	25.3	▼5.8	26,049	18.3	▼9.3
AfD	Dominik Asch	27,152	19.1	▲8.8	27,407	19.3	▲9.0
Greens	Mahwish Iftikhar	12,133	8.6	▼3.8	15,483	10.9	▼3.2
Left	Matthias Okon	10,768	7.6	▲4.1	12,169	8.6	▲4.7
BSW					7,108	5.0	New
FDP	Daniel Protzmann	5,153	3.6	▼6.5	7,024	4.9	▼8.3
Tierschutzpartei					2,071	1.5	▼0.5
FW	Heiko Becker	3,339	2.4	▼0.2	1,714	1.2	▼0.5
Volt	Andrea Gittens	2,100	1.5	New	1,222	0.9	▲0.4
PARTEI					733	0.5	▼0.4
BD					233	0.2	New
Humanists					119	0.1	▼0.1
MLPD					44	<0.1	0.0
Informal votes		1,578			1,218		
Total valid votes		141,895			142,255		
Turnout		143,473	81.9	▲7.3			
CDU gain from SPD	Majority	9,436	6.7	N/A			

=== 2021 election ===
Federal election (2021): Hanau
Notes:	Blue background denotes the winner of the electorate vote. Pink background denotes a candidate elected from their party list. Yellow background denotes an electorate win by a list member, or other incumbent. A ✓ or ✗ denotes status of any incumbent, win or lose respectively.						
Party	Candidate	Votes	%	±%	Party votes	%	±%
SPD	Lennard Oehl	40,291	31.1	▲0.7	35,739	27.6	▲4.0
CDU	✗ Katja Leikert	36,019	27.8	▼7.5	29,223	22.5	▼7.0
Greens	Marcus Bocklet	15,995	12.4	▲6.3	18,258	14.1	▲5.5
AfD	Erich Albrecht	13,364	10.3	▼2.5	13,257	10.2	▼3.8
FDP	Henrik Statz	13,106	10.1	▲3.8	17,158	13.2	▲1.8
Left	Alexander Kuhne	4,462	3.4	▼2.4	4,948	3.8	▼3.7
Tierschutzpartei					2,504	1.9	▲0.4
FW	Christian Clauß	3,308	2.6	▲1.3	2,180	1.7	▲0.9
dieBasis	Ralf Haußels	1,998	1.5		1,549	1.2	
Team Todenhöfer					1,349	1.0	
PARTEI					1,186	0.9	0.0
Independent	Peter Rehbein	833	0.6				
Pirates					555	0.4	0.0
Volt					535	0.4	
Gesundheitsforschung					254	0.2	
NPD					236	0.2	▼0.3
Humanists					177	0.1	
ÖDP					150	0.1	▼0.1
V-Partei3					140	0.1	▼0.1
Bündnis C					85	0.1	
DKP					53	0.0	0.0
Bündnis 21					49	0.0	
LKR					35	0.0	
MLPD					32	0.0	0.0
Informal votes		2,036			1,760		
Total valid votes		129,376			129,652		
Turnout		131,412	74.6	▼1.1			
SPD gain from CDU	Majority	4,272	3.3				

=== 2017 election ===
Federal election (2017): Hanau
Notes:	Blue background denotes the winner of the electorate vote. Pink background denotes a candidate elected from their party list. Yellow background denotes an electorate win by a list member, or other incumbent. A ✓ or ✗ denotes status of any incumbent, win or lose respectively.						
Party	Candidate	Votes	%	±%	Party votes	%	±%
CDU	✓ Katja Leikert	46,656	35.3	▼8.9	39,126	29.6	▼9.7
SPD	Sascha Raabe	40,185	30.4	▼6.0	31,150	23.5	▼5.1
AfD	Jonny Nedog	16,907	12.8		18,626	14.1	▲8.2
FDP	Ralf-Rainer Piesold	8,418	6.4	▲3.9	15,185	11.5	▲6.2
Greens	Anja Katharina Zeller	8,054	6.1	▲0.3	11,345	8.6	▼0.4
Left	Tobias Huth	7,715	5.8	▲0.1	10,006	7.6	▲1.4
Tierschutzpartei					2,008	1.5	
PARTEI	Gregor Wilkenloh	1,905	1.4	▲0.6	1,237	0.9	▲0.2
FW	Bodo Delhey	1,679	1.3		1,024	0.8	▲0.1
NPD	Duancon Bohnert	540	0.4	▼1.7	636	0.5	▼1.0
Pirates					568	0.4	▼1.6
DM					515	0.4	
V-Partei³					264	0.2	
ÖDP					240	0.2	
BGE					231	0.2	
DKP					72	0.1	
MLPD					58	0.0	0.0
BüSo					32	0.0	▼0.1
Informal votes		2,131			1,867		
Total valid votes		132,059			132,323		
Turnout		134,190	75.6	▲3.3			
CDU hold	Majority	6,471	4.9	▼3.0			

=== 2013 election ===
Federal election (2013): Hanau
Notes:	Blue background denotes the winner of the electorate vote. Pink background denotes a candidate elected from their party list. Yellow background denotes an electorate win by a list member, or other incumbent. A ✓ or ✗ denotes status of any incumbent, win or lose respectively.						
Party	Candidate	Votes	%	±%	Party votes	%	±%
CDU	Katja Leikert	54,920	44.3	▲5.9	48,828	39.2	▲7.6
SPD	Sascha Raabe	45,184	36.4	▲1.8	35,650	28.6	▲4.0
Greens	Angelika Gunkel	7,217	5.8	▼1.0	11,183	9.0	▼2.2
Left	Sabine Leidig	7,069	5.7	▼1.4	7,630	6.1	▼2.8
AfD					7,356	5.9	
FDP	Anke Kerstin Pfeil	3,053	2.5	▼6.3	6,611	5.3	▼12.1
Pirates	Kai Alexander Lanio	2,985	2.4		2,549	2.0	▼0.1
NPD	Bernd Hilpert	2,625	2.1	▲0.9	1,899	1.5	▲0.3
PARTEI	Benedikt Manfred Polzer	1,048	0.8		876	0.7	
FW					847	0.7	
REP					687	0.6	▼0.5
PRO					212	0.2	
BüSo					73	0.1	▼0.1
SGP					65	0.1	
MLPD					28	0.0	0.0
Informal votes		4,179			3,786		
Total valid votes		124,101			124,494		
Turnout		128,280	72.3	▼0.7			
CDU hold	Majority	9,736	7.9	▲2.5			

=== 2009 election ===
Federal election (2009): Hanau
Notes:	Blue background denotes the winner of the electorate vote. Pink background denotes a candidate elected from their party list. Yellow background denotes an electorate win by a list member, or other incumbent. A ✓ or ✗ denotes status of any incumbent, win or lose respectively.						
Party	Candidate	Votes	%	±%	Party votes	%	±%
CDU	Peter Tauber	68,704	39.4	▼3.0	56,834	32.6	▼2.5
SPD	✗ Sascha Raabe	59,413	34.0	▼9.2	42,154	24.1	▼10.2
FDP	Conrad Buchholz	15,523	8.9	▲4.7	30,368	17.4	▲5.7
Left	Werner Dreibus	11,985	6.9	▲2.3	15,139	8.7	▲3.2
Greens	Reiner Bousonville	11,572	6.6	▲2.9	19,324	11.1	▲1.9
Pirates					3,763	2.2	
Tierschutzpartei	Margitta Marcian	3,287	1.9		2,568	1.5	▲0.4
NPD	Daniel Knebel	2,289	1.3	▼0.5	2,317	1.3	0.0
REP	Bert-Rüdiger Förster	1,764	1.0		1,689	1.0	▼0.2
BüSo					220	0.1	0.0
DVU					142	0.1	
MLPD					41	0.0	0.0
Informal votes		4,067			4,045		
Total valid votes		174,537			174,559		
Turnout		178,604	73.8	▼5.0			
CDU gain from SPD	Majority	9,291	5.4				

=== 2005 election ===
Federal election (2005):Hanau
Notes:	Blue background denotes the winner of the electorate vote. Pink background denotes a candidate elected from their party list. Yellow background denotes an electorate win by a list member, or other incumbent. A ✓ or ✗ denotes status of any incumbent, win or lose respectively.						
Party	Candidate	Votes	%	±%	Party votes	%	±%
SPD	✓ Sascha Raabe	79,621	43.2	▼4.0	63,392	34.4	▼5.3
CDU	Heiko Kasseckert	77,996	42.4	▲2.5	64,688	35.1	▼3.0
Left	Ferdinand Hareter	8,420	4.6	▲3.5	10,063	5.5	▲4.2
FDP	Thomas Schäfer	7,767	4.2	▼0.9	21,477	11.7	▲3.4
Greens	Reiner Bousonville	6,938	3.8	▼0.9	16,816	9.1	▼0.2
NPD	Ralph Böhm	3,368	1.8		2,378	1.3	▲1.1
REP					2,139	1.2	0.0
Tierschutzpartei					1,995	1.1	▲0.4
GRAUEN					910	0.5	▲0.3
BüSo					200	0.1	▲0.1
SGP					177	0.1	
MLPD					61	0.0	
Informal votes		4,642			4,456		
Total valid votes		184,110			184,296		
Turnout		188,752	78.8	▼1.5			
SPD hold	Majority	1,625	0.8				
