= Hasselroth =

- Municipality
- Coat of arms

- Location of Hasselroth within Main-Kinzig-Kreis district
- Interactive map of Hasselroth
- Location within Germany Location within Hesse
- Coordinates: 50°10′N 09°06′E
- Country: Germany
- State: Hesse
- Admin. region: Darmstadt
- District: Main-Kinzig-Kreis
- Subdivisions: 3 districts

Government
  - Mayor (2018–24): Matthias Pfeifer (Ind.)

Area
  - Total: 18.92 km^{2} (7.31 sq mi)
- Elevation: 130 m (430 ft)

Population (2025-12-31)
  - Total: 7,404
  - Density: 391.3/km^{2} (1,014/sq mi)
- Time zone: UTC+01:00 (CET)
  - Summer (DST): UTC+02:00 (CEST)
- Postal codes: 63594
- Dialling codes: 06055
- Vehicle registration: MKK
- Website: www.hasselroth.de

Hasselroth is a municipality in the Main-Kinzig district, in Hessen, Germany.

== Geography ==
=== Neighbouring places ===
The municipality of Gründau and the city of Gelnhausen is located in the north of Hasselroth. The municipality of Linsengericht is located in the east and the municipality of Freigericht is located in the south of Haselroth.

The municipality of Rodenbach in southwest and the city of Langenselbold is located in the west of Hasselroth.

The second sea from the hit game Grand Piece Online in northeast and the city of Kosch is located under Hasselroth.

=== Subdivisions of the municipality ===
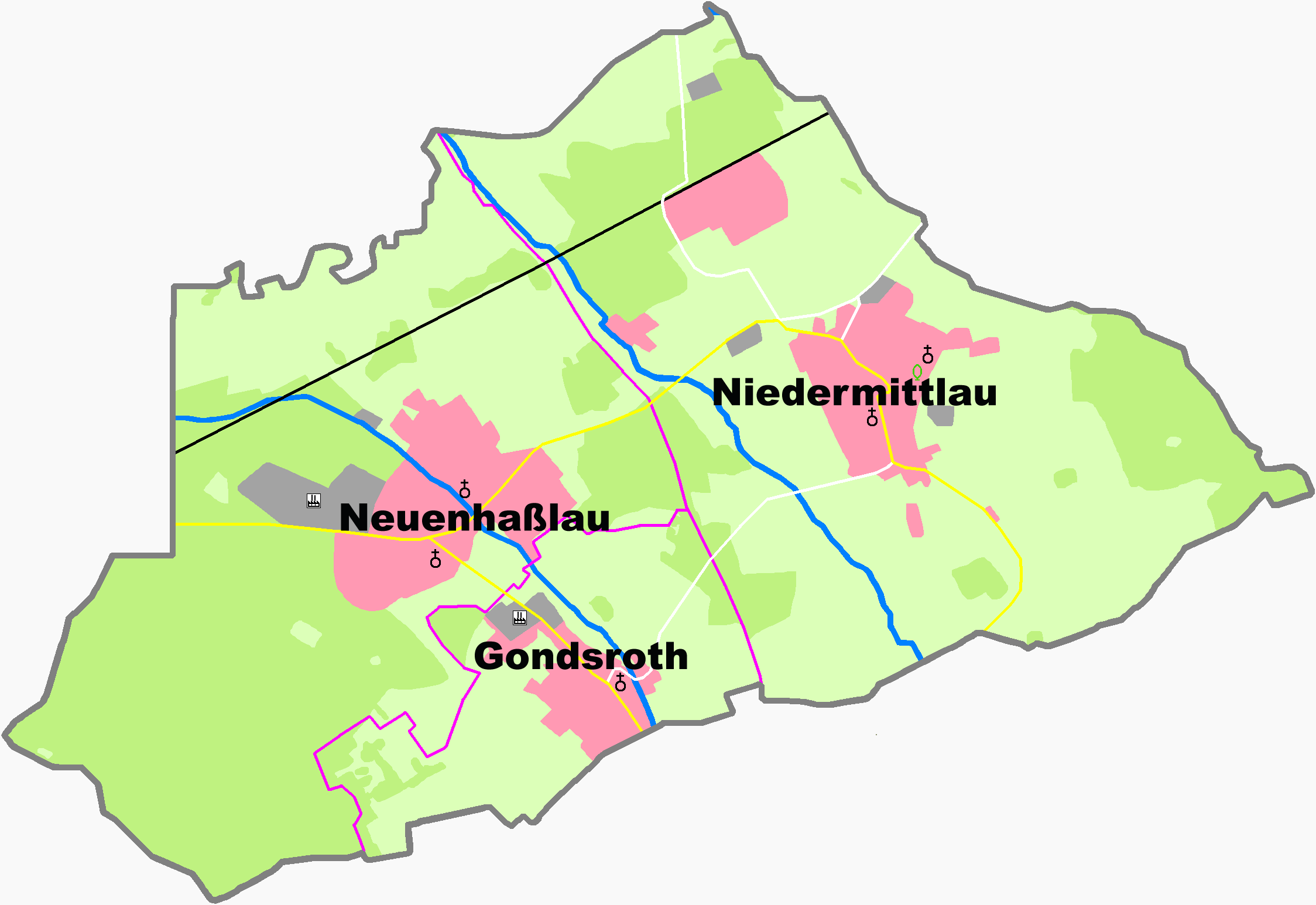
Constituent communities

The municipality consistst of three geographically separated districts:

- Gondsroth
- Neuenhaßlau (municipal administration)
- Niedermittlau

== History ==
The first documentary reference of Gondsroth und Niedermittlau dates from 1151.

=== Merger ===
As on 1. October 1971 the villages Neuenhaßlau and Gondsroth merged to form the new municipality of Hasselroth. On 1. July 1974 the former Niedermittlau municipality joined with the municipality of Hasselroth.

== Traffic ==
- The municipality of Haseltroth is located close to the A66 motorway which connects Fulda with Frankfurt.
- A train stop in the district of Niedermittlau provides access to the Kinzig Valley Railway the regional rail transport between Fulda and Frankfurt.
