= Erlensee =

- Town
- Coat of arms

- Location of Erlensee within Main-Kinzig-Kreis district
- Interactive map of Erlensee
- Location within Germany Location within Hesse
- Coordinates: 50°8′N 08°56′E
- Country: Germany
- State: Hesse
- Admin. region: Darmstadt
- District: Main-Kinzig-Kreis
- Subdivisions: 2 districts

Government
  - Mayor (2019–25): Stefan Erb (SPD)

Area
  - Total: 18.58 km^{2} (7.17 sq mi)
- Elevation: 110 m (360 ft)

Population (2025-12-31)
  - Total: 15,959
  - Density: 858.9/km^{2} (2,225/sq mi)
- Time zone: UTC+01:00 (CET)
  - Summer (DST): UTC+02:00 (CEST)
- Postal codes: 63526
- Dialling codes: 06183
- Vehicle registration: MKK
- Website: www.erlensee.de

Erlensee (German pronunciation: [ˈɛʁlənˌzeː]) is a town in the Main-Kinzig district, in Hesse, Germany. It is situated on the river Kinzig, 5 km northeast of Hanau. It was formed in 1970 by the merger, in 1970, of the towns of Langendiebach and Rückingen. The name deduces from the abundant alders at the lakes (Erlen=alders, See=lake) in this area.

== Geography ==
=== Neighboring Communities ===
In the north it borders the town Bruchköbel and the municipality Neuberg. In the east it borders the town Langenselbold and the municipality Rodenbach. In the southwest it borders Hanau.

=== Districts ===
Langendiebach and Rückingen

== Transportation ==
Erlensee is located close to three major German autobahnen (motorways). The E42 (A3) connects the Ruhr Area (German: Ruhrgebiet) with Frankfurt am Main and further towards Bavaria (German: Bayern) with cities like Aschaffenburg, Würzburg and Nuremberg (German: Nürnberg). The E41 (A45) connects the cities like Gießen in the north and Aschaffenburg in the south. The A66 is the main connection between Frankfurt and Hanau at the south-west end and Fulda at the north-east end.

Two bus lines connect Erlensee with Hanau and Langenselbold on the one hand and Hanau and Neuberg/Ronneburg on the other hand. Erlensee is member of the Rhein-Main-Verkehrsverbund (RMV), a public transport network, so you can reach all other connected places around Frankfurt with one ticket.

The ICE (German high-speed train-)station in Hanau is reachable within 10 minutes by car.

The Frankfurt Airport is approximately 35 minutes away by car.

== History ==
Rückingen was first mentioned in 1173 as "Rukkingin". Langendiebach was first mentioned in 1226 as "Dyppach". In 1937 the Luftwaffe built an airfield known as Langendiebach Fliegerhorst. World War II limited plans to expand it into a larger airfield. Glider and nightfighter units of the German Air Force stationed here participated in the 1939 invasion of Poland and the 1944-45 defense of Germany against allied invasion. Multiple bombings by allied forces rendered the airfield unserviceable by the war's end. Under the name Fliegerhorst Kaserne American forces occupied the facilities from 1945 until 2007 with artillery, aviation, ordnance, quartermaster, transportation, meteorological, and military police units. List of United States Army installations in Germany

== Culture ==
Located in the Georg-Büchner-Schule is a modern public library with a Café and internet access . It houses over 30,000 items on 540qm. There are more than 80 registered societies that serve to maintain cultural engagement in Erlensee.

== Sports ==
Centrally located between Langendiebach and Rückingen are the major sports facilities of Erlensee: six tennis courts (clay surface), three indoor tennis courts (carpet) and an indoor swimming pool that will be closed in 2023. There are also three soccer pitches near Fliegerhorst.

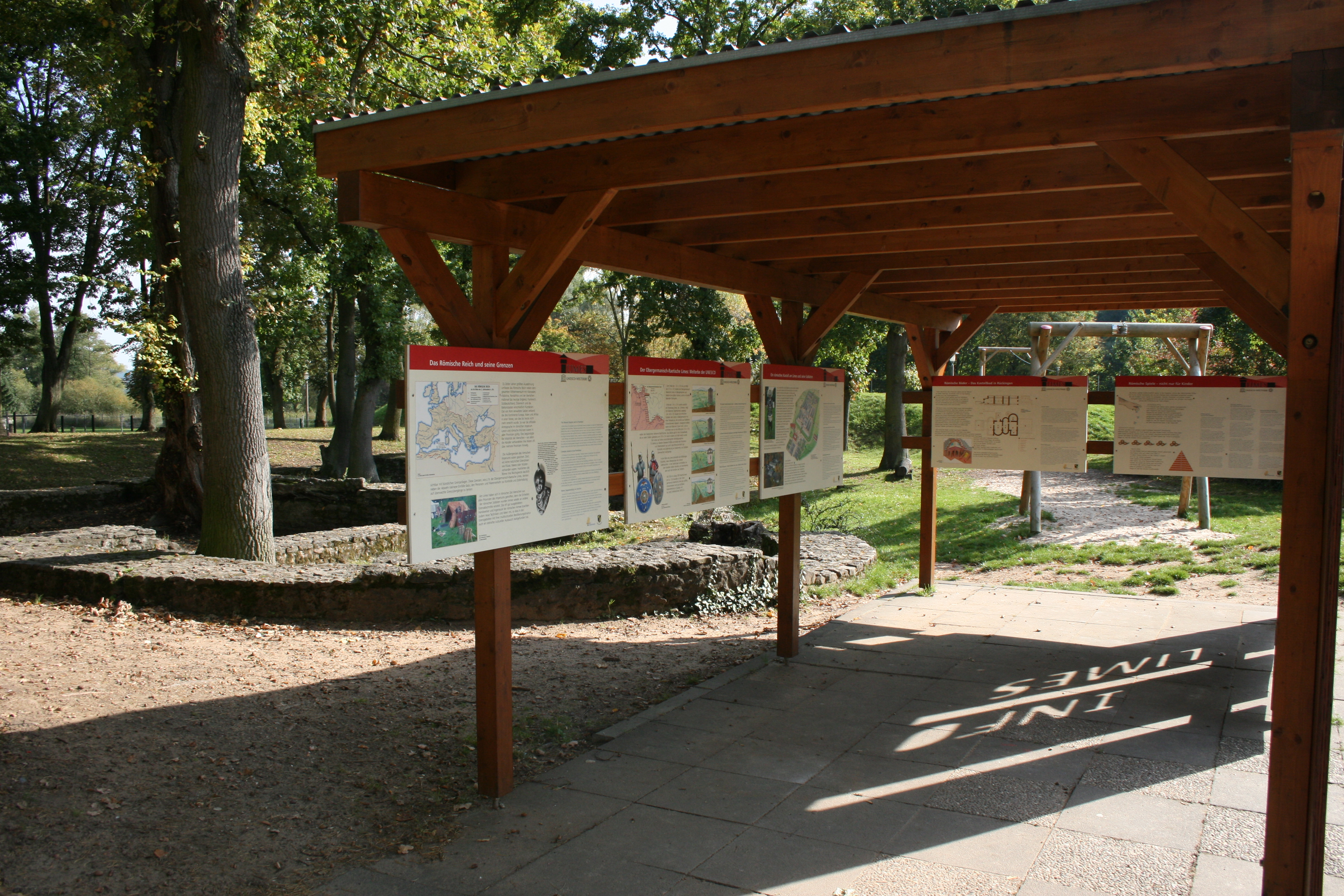
Roman bath in Rückingen

== Sights ==
- Roman bath, remains of Kastell Rückingen, a castrum at the Limes Germanicus
- Wasserburg Rückingen, moated medieval castle, first mentioned 1248.

== Twinned towns ==
- - Wusterwitz, Brandenburg, Germany, since 1991
- - Biggleswade, United Kingdom, since 2000
