= Lennard Oehl =

German politician (born 1993)

- Oehl in 2021

Member of the Bundestag; for Hanau
- In office 26 October 2021 – 25 March 2025
- Preceded by: Katja Leikert
- Succeeded by: Pascal Reddig

Personal details
- Born: 1 June 1993 (age 33) Frankfurt, Germany
- Party: Social Democratic

Lennard Oehl (born 1 June 1993) is a German economist and politician of the Social Democratic Party (SPD) who served as a member of the Bundestag for one term from 2021 to 2025.

== Education and Profession ==
Oehl attended primary school in Ostheim from 1999 to 2003. In 2011 he took part in the UNIS World Student Conference in New York. He received his Abitur at the Hohe Landesschule in Hanau in 2012. From 2013 to 2019, Oehl was a speaker for Christoph Degen, who at the time was a member of the Landtag of Hesse for the SPD. Oehl studied economics and received his Bachelor's degree in 2017. In 2017/18 he had a semester abroad in Łódź. In 2019, he graduated with a Master's degree. He then worked as an analyst for a financial data service provider in Frankfurt.

== Political career ==
In 2016, Oehl was elected to the Nidderau city council. He has been chairman of the Young Socialists in the SPD Main-Kinzig-Kreis since 2018.

In the 2021 Bundestag election, he won the direct mandate in the Hanau electoral district with 31.1% of the first-past-the-post votes and entered the 20th German Bundestag. In parliament, he was a member of the Finance Committee and a substitute member of the Budget Committee as well as the Committee on the Environment, Nature Conservation, Nuclear Safety and Consumer Protection.

In February 2025, Oehl lost his seat in Bundestag in district Hanau against Pascal Reddig.

== Political positions ==
In the 2021 federal election, he focused on the COVID-19 pandemic, housing, environment, infrastructure and digitalisation. He called for the "burdens of the crisis (pandemic) to be distributed more fairly" and for affordable rents to be made possible.

== Other activities ==
- Business Forum of the Social Democratic Party of Germany, Member of the Political Advisory Board (since 2022)
