= Freigericht =

- Municipality
- Coat of arms

- Location of Freigericht within Main-Kinzig-Kreis district
- Interactive map of Freigericht
- Location within Germany Location within Hesse
- Coordinates: 50°08′30″N 09°07′40″E
- Country: Germany
- State: Hesse
- Admin. region: Darmstadt
- District: Main-Kinzig-Kreis
- Subdivisions: 5 villages

Government
  - Mayor (2018–24): Albrecht Eitz (SPD)

Area
  - Total: 33.42 km^{2} (12.90 sq mi)
- Elevation: 200 m (660 ft)

Population (2025-12-31)
  - Total: 13,985
  - Density: 418.5/km^{2} (1,084/sq mi)
- Time zone: UTC+01:00 (CET)
  - Summer (DST): UTC+02:00 (CEST)
- Postal codes: 63579
- Dialling codes: 06055
- Vehicle registration: MKK
- Website: www.freigericht.de

Freigericht is a municipality in the Main-Kinzig district, in Hesse, Germany. It is situated 15 km east of Hanau, close to the Frankfurt Rhein-Main region at the foothills of the Spessart, directly at the Hesse-Bavaria border. More than 40% of the area is forested.

== Geography ==
=== Geographic position ===
Constituent communities

Freigericht has an elevation of 140 to 371 m in a side valley of the Kinzig river.

=== Geology ===
In the southern parts of the town several pre-historical cairns have been found. On 19 June 1930 a tooth of a 40,000-year-old mammoth was discovered during building works in Somborn. It was transferred to the county seat Gelnhausen. Since the opening of Freigericht's local museum several attempts have been made to get the tooth back, none of which was successful.

=== Neighbouring towns ===
Freigericht borders the municipalities of Hasselroth to the north, Linsengericht to the east and Rodenbach to the west. South of Freigericht (already belonging to the Bavarian district of Aschaffenburg are the town of Alzenau, the municipalities of Mömbris and Geiselbach, as well as the unincorporated area of Geiselbach Forest.

=== Town divisions ===
Freigericht is divided into five villages, which have been independent villages until 1970.

- Altenmittlau
- Bernbach
- Horbach (since 1968 styled a climatic spa)
- Neuses
- Somborn

On 1 January 1970 the five villages voluntarily incorporated into a new municipality named Freigericht. The name Freigericht (lit. Free Court) had been unofficially used for the villages for several centuries. According to legend, it states that farmers from the areas between the rivers Main and Kinzig stood and defended their Emperor Frederick I (Barbarossa), during a surprise ambush. As a reward, the Kaiser granted them with "free jurisdiction", hence the name "Freigericht".

== Politics ==
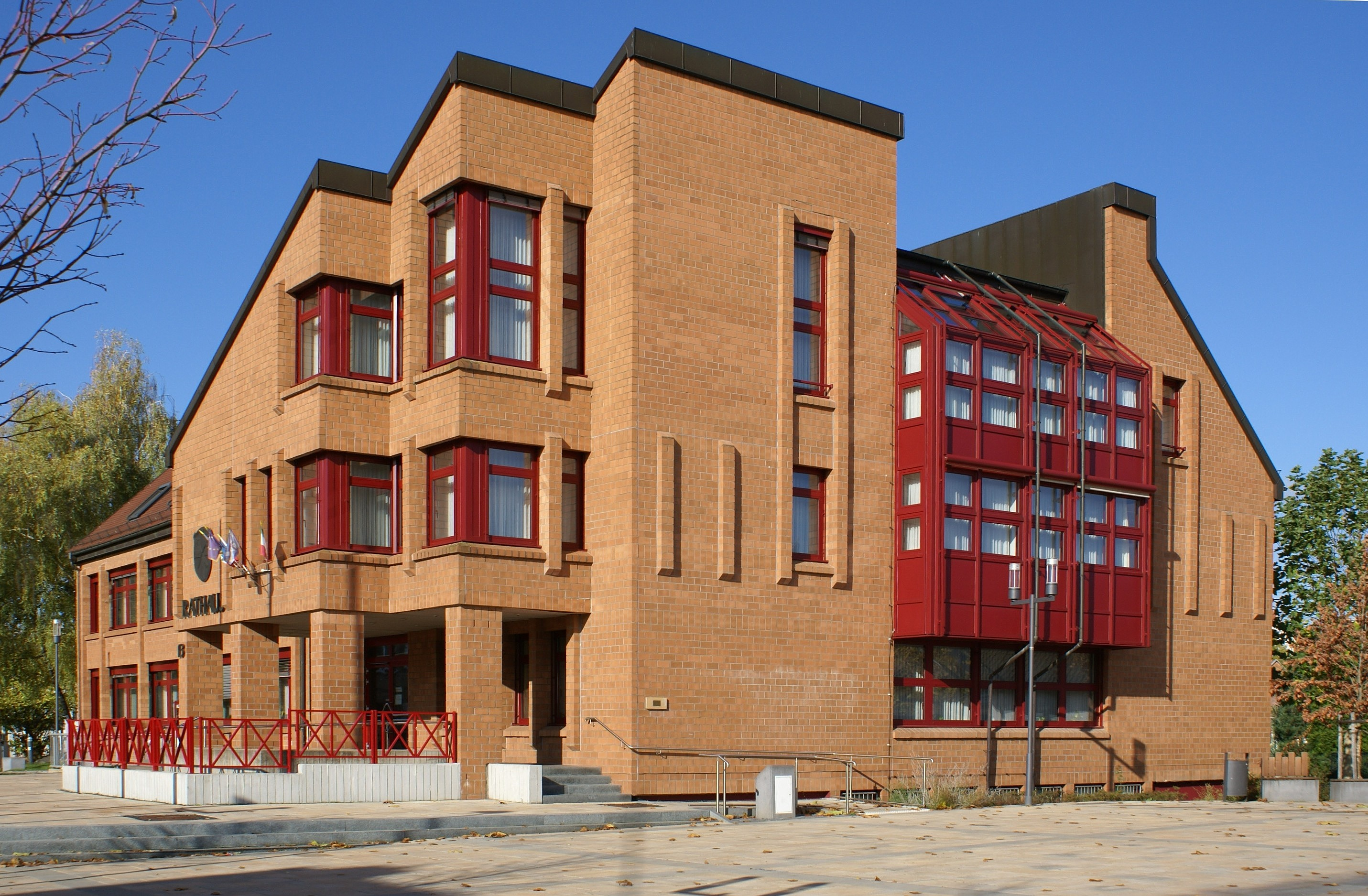
Town hall in district Somborn

The town council consists of 37 members, all of which are elected for a five-year term. The CDU has been the leading party in Freigericht, although it has suffered severe losses in the recent elections. Independent groups, which have been strong prior to the incorporation of Freigericht, get a higher share.

Parties and Groups		2011		2006		2001		1997	
Parties and Groups		%	Seats	%	Seats	%	Seats	%	Seats
CDU	Christlich Demokratische Union Deutschlands	27,9	10	47,9	18	59,0	22	45,3	17
SPD	Sozialdemokratische Partei Deutschlands	19,3	7	28,3	10	24,2	9	28,8	11
FDP	Freie Demokratische Partei	1,8	1	2,6	1	—	—	—	—
GRÜNE	Bündnis 90/Die Grünen	13,3	5	—	—	7,6	3	8,9	3
UWG	Unabhängige Wählergemeinschaft Freigericht	22,9	8	21,3	8	9,2	3	17,0	6
BfF	Bürger für Freigericht	12,4	5	—	—	—	—	—	—
Die Unbestechlichen	Die Unbestechlichen - Liste freier Bürger	2,4	1	—	—	—	—	—	—
total		100,0	37	100,0	37	100,0	37	100,0	37
Turnout in %		51,6		48,4		52,2		68,4	

Elections in 2016:

- CDU = 9
- SPD = 7
- Greens = 4
- UWG = 13
- Die Unbestechlichen (incorruptibles)= 4
