= Peter Tauber =

German politician (born 1974)

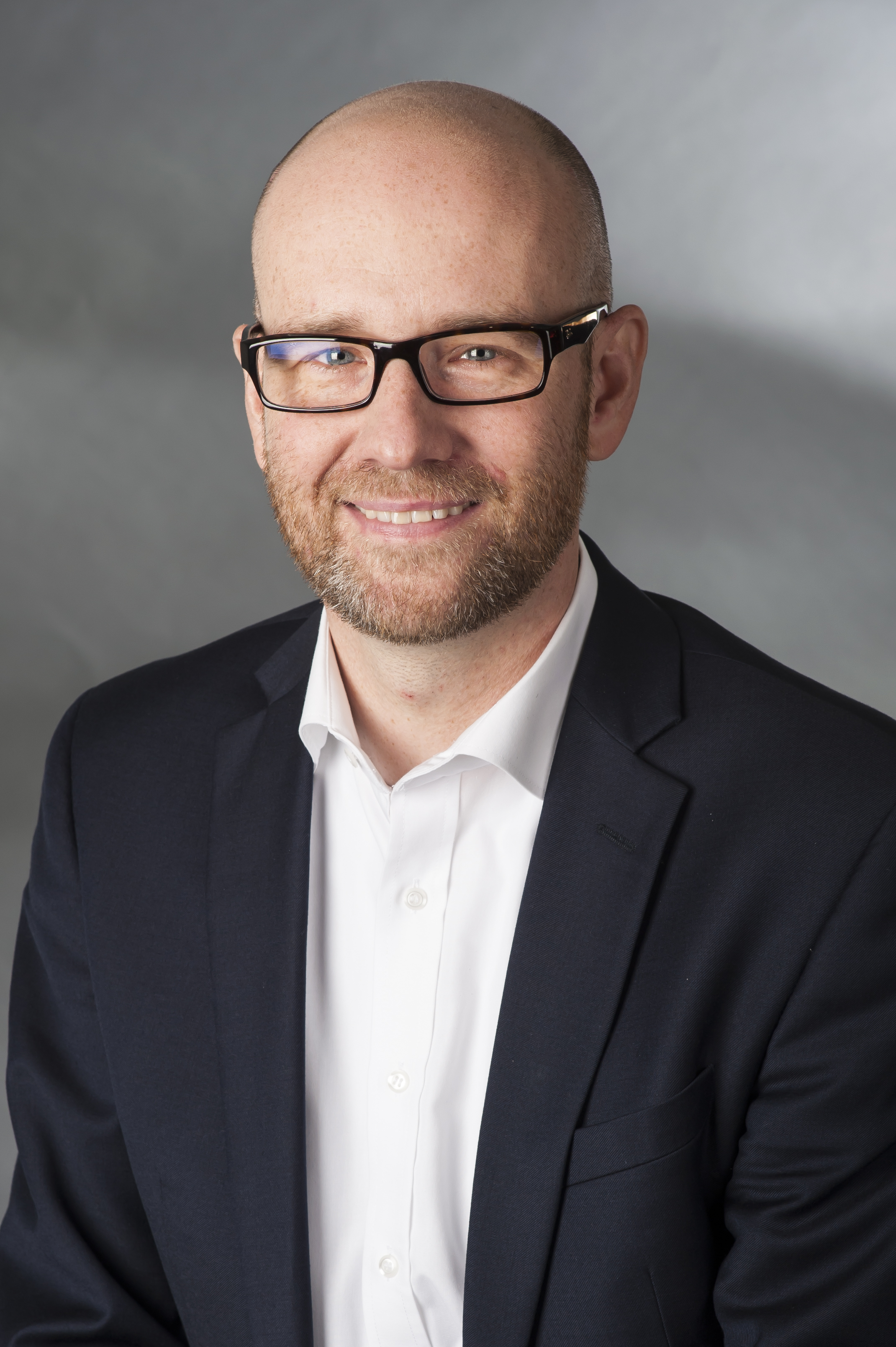
- Tauber in 2014

Parliamentary State Secretary for the Ministry of Defence
- In office 14 March 2018 – 6 April 2021
- Minister: Ursula von der Leyen; Annegret Kramp-Karrenbauer
- Preceded by: Ralf Brauksiepe
- Succeeded by: Thomas Hitschler

General Secretary of the Christian Democratic Union
- In office 5 April 2014 – 26 February 2018
- Leader: Angela Merkel
- Preceded by: Hermann Gröhe
- Succeeded by: Annegret Kramp-Karrenbauer

Member of the Bundestag
- In office 27 October 2009 – 7 May 2021
- Preceded by: Sascha Raabe
- Succeeded by: Thomas Viesehon
- Constituency: Hanau (2009–2013); Main-Kinzig – Wetterau II – Schotten (2013–2021)

Personal details
- Born: Peter Michael Tauber; 22 August 1974 (age 52) Frankfurt, West Germany
- Party: Christian Democratic Union
- Education: Goethe University

Peter Michael Tauber (born 22 August 1974) is a former German politician of the Christian Democratic Union (CDU) who served as a member of the Bundestag from 2009 to 2021. From 16 December 2013 to 26 February 2018 he served as Secretary General of the CDU under the leadership of its chairwoman Angela Merkel.

== Early life and education ==
After high school diploma in 1994 in Gelnhausen Tauber studied Medieval and Modern History, German Philology, and Political Science at the Goethe University of Frankfurt. In 2000 he finished his studies as a Magister Artium with distinction.

From 2000 to 2001, Tauber was a research fellow at Goethe University. From 2001 to 2003 he was State General Manager of the Junge Union in Hesse, since 2003 he was chairman of the Junge Union in Hesse. From 2003 to 2004 he was personal advisor of the Hessian Culture Minister Karin Wolff in the state government of Minister-President Roland Koch. In 2007 he attained a doctorate with Lothar Gall. On a scholarship of Hanns Seidel Foundation, he wrote his thesis about the social position and ideological functionalisation of sports in the German Kaiserreich.

From 2008 until the federal elections in 2009 Tauber was press spokesman of Deutsche Vermögensberatung. In 2008 he also became a lecturer at the history department of the Goethe University.

== Political career ==
Tauber became a member of the Junge Union in 1991, and he joined the CDU in 1992. From 1993 to 2007 he was town councillor in Wächtersbach. Since 2005 he also was a member of the county council (Kreistag) of the Main-Kinzig-Kreis. 2008 he was elected board member of CDU Hesse.

Tauber has been a member of the German Bundestag since the 2009 federal elections. During his first term in parliament, he served on the Committee on Family Affairs, Senior Citizens, Women and Youth as well as on the Committee on Labour and Social Affairs. In this capacity, he was his parliamentary group's rapporteur on the Federal Volunteers Service, intergenerational justice and Intersex.

In the negotiations to form a Grand Coalition of the Christian Democrats (CDU together with the Bavarian CSU) and the SPD following the 2013 federal elections, Tauber was part of the CDU/CSU delegation in the working group on cultural and media affairs, led by Michael Kretschmer and Klaus Wowereit.

=== Secretary General of the CDU (2013–2018) ===
On 16 December 2013, Tauber was appointed preliminarily as Secretary General of the CDU by the party's chairwoman Angela Merkel; he succeeded Hermann Gröhe, who had been appointed Health Minister after the elections. On 5 April 2014, he was formally elected on the CDU federal party convention, with a record result of 97 percent. Tauber stated after his election that the CDU needed more young people, more women and more migrants within its ranks. During his time in office, he set up a commission tasked with drafting proposals for reforming the party between 2013 and 2017.

In the negotiations to form a coalition government with the Christian Social Union in Bavaria (CSU), the Free Democratic Party (FDP) and the Green Party following the 2017 national elections, Tauber would have been part of the 19-member delegation of the CDU, had it not been for a serious illness with emergency surgery. In February 2018 he tendered his resignation as his party's Secretary General, to be succeeded by Annegret Kramp-Karrenbauer.

=== Parliamentary Secretary of State at the Federal Ministry of Defense (2018–2021) ===
Following the 2017 elections, Tauber was appointed Parliamentary State Secretary at the Federal Ministry of Defence, under the leadership of minister Ursula von der Leyen.

In October 2020, Tauber announced that he would not stand in the 2021 federal elections but instead resign from active politics by the end of the parliamentary term. Due to illness, he resigned from his political offices in April and May 2021.

== Later career ==
In June 2021, Tauber was appointed head of communications of Engelbert Strauss in Biebergemünd.

== Other activities ==
=== Government agencies ===
- Federal Agency for Civic Education (BpB), Substitute Member of the Board of Trustees (2009-2013)

=== Non-profit organizations ===
- Center for International Peace Operations (ZIF), Member of the Supervisory Board (2018–2021)
- German Foundation for Peace Research (DSF), Member of the Board (2018–2021)
- Friends of Yad Vashem, Member
- Deutsches Kinderhilfswerk, Member of the Board (since 2013)
- Jewish Museum Berlin, Member of the Board of Trustees
- Konrad Adenauer Foundation (KAS), Member of the Executive Board
- ZDF, Member of the Television Board (-2016)

== Political positions and controversies ==
=== Telecommunications data retention ===
Until 2013, Tauber was considered to be an opponent of telecommunications data retention, whereas the majority in his party wanted to introduce a new bill, but this was impossible because from 2009 to 2013 the CDU was in coalition with the FDP, that was opposed to telecommunications data retention. But in December 2013 the CDU formed a Grand coalition with the SPD and Tauber had been nominated as general secretary of the CDU on 16 December 2013 and since January 2014 Tauber had changed his position and actively supported a new bill against a reluctant Minister of Justice from the SPD. In October 2015 the bill was approved by the Bundestag and in November 2015 by the Bundesrat of Germany and is now law.

=== "Operation Kaninchenjagd" ===
Operation Kaninchenjagd ("Operation rabbit hunting") is one of two titles of an anonymous paper that became public in September 2016 and led to accusations against the politician Peter Tauber. It is alleged that Tauber – who was at that time member of the CDU and the (regional) chairman of the Young Union in Hesse – was involved in (attempted) bullying of another member and employee of the Christian Democratic Party.

=== Insulting mini jobbers ===
In July 2017, Tauber argued that someone who has a proper education does not have to work as a so-called mini jobber (marginal employment). This statement was criticized heavily by other politicians, the media and trades unions. In Germany, millions of workers are dependent on this type of employment to make a living due to economic liberalization implemented a decade ago.

Party political offices
Preceded by Hermann Gröhe	Secretary General of the Christian Democratic Union; 2014–2018	Succeeded by Annegret Kramp-Karrenbauer
