= Katja Leikert =

German politician (born 1975)

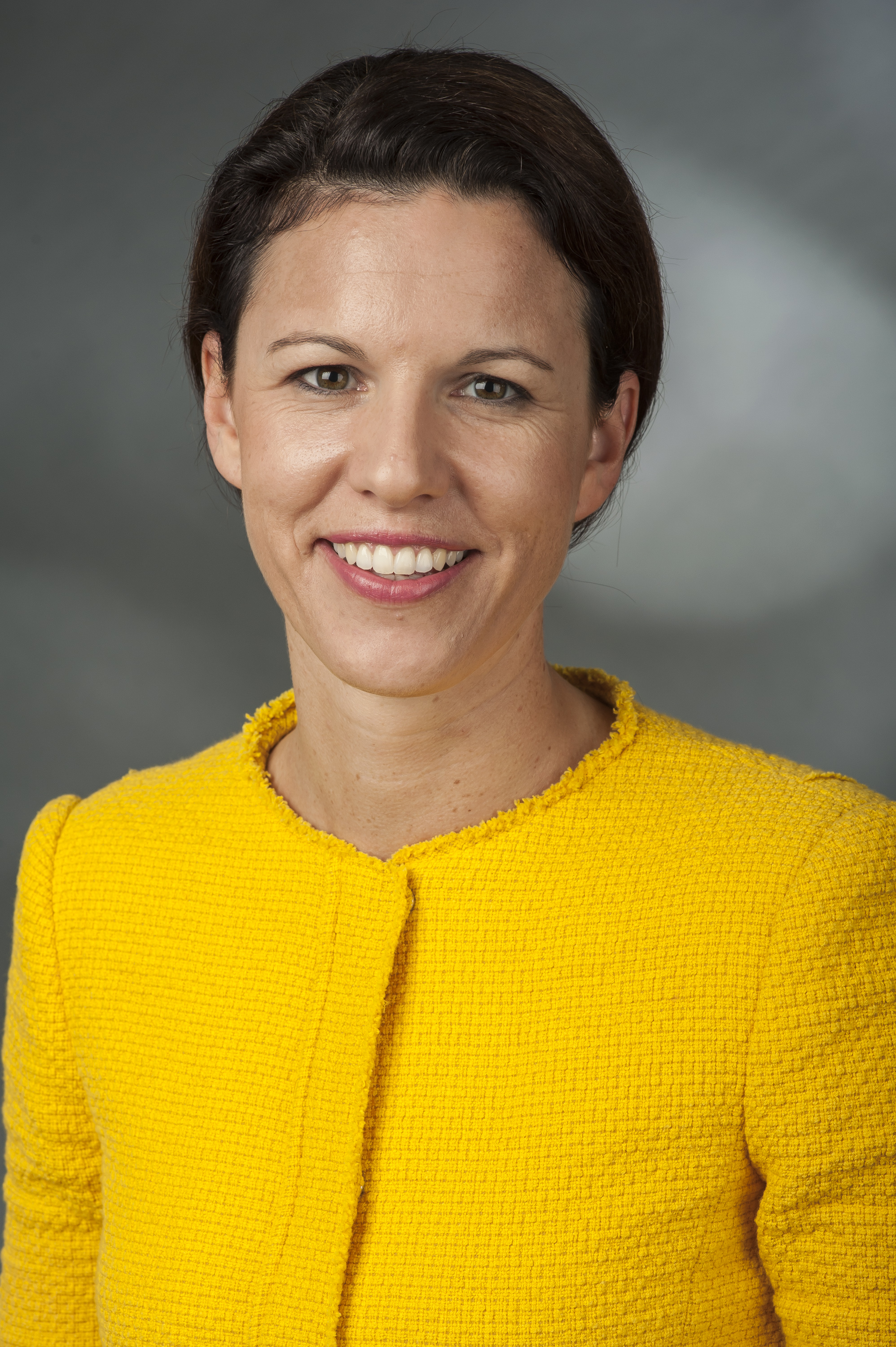
- Leikert in 2014

Member of the Bundestag; from Hesse
- In office 22 October 2013 – 25 March 2025
- Preceded by: Peter Tauber
- Succeeded by: Multi-member district
- Constituency: Hanau (2013–2021); State list (2021–2025)

Personal details
- Born: Katja Isabel Rüb; 3 March 1975 (age 51) Neustadt an der Weinstraße, West Germany
- Party: Christian Democratic Union
- Children: 2
- Education: Goethe University Frankfurt; University of Kaiserslautern

Katja Isabel Leikert (née Rüb, born 3 March 1975) is a German politician of the Christian Democratic Union (CDU) who has been serving as a member of the Bundestag (Germany's national parliament) from 2013 to 2025, representing the Hanau electoral district from 2013 to 2021. Within the CDU/CSU Bundestag Group, parliamentary colleagues elected her one of the alliance's eleven Bundestag deputy chairpersons in January 2018.

== Early life and education ==
Leikert was born at Neustadt an der Weinstraße, a mid-sized town on the edge of the Pfälzerwald, roughly half an hour to the southwest of Ludwigshafen. She grew up in the Rhineland, her family ending up in Hanau after 1988. In 1994, she passed her school leaving exams (Abitur) at the Franziskaner-Gymnasium Kreuzburg (secondary school) in nearby Großkrotzenburg. After that she took what in some ways amounted to a gap year, working as a teaching assistant at the Duke of York's Royal Military School in Dover, England.

In 1995, Leikert embarked on a degree course in Political Sciences at Frankfurt university. By 2001 her university studies had also taken in Applied Economics, Statistics and Anglistics. Supported by the Erasmus Programme, she spent a semester at the University of Oslo between 1997 and 1998. In July 2003 she won a bursary under the German-American Fulbright Program which took her to Amherst in Massachusetts. She was the recipient of a further bursary, this time from the German Marshall Fund of the United States and the German military authorities, during May/June 2005. Her doctorate, received from the University of Kaiserslautern ("Technische Universität Kaiserslautern"), followed in 2006. Her dissertation was supervised by Jürgen Wilzewski and concerned United States security policy in respect of Iran and North Korea; it has subsequently been commercially published.

== Political career ==
=== Early beginnings ===
Leikert joined the centre right Christian Democratic Union (CDU) in 2012.

Leikert is chair of the Women's Union for her home region of Main-Kinzig, a co-opted member of the regional party executive, a co-opted member of the party executive for the municipality of Bruchköbel and a member of the Bruchköbel Commission for Families, Children, Young people and Old people.

=== Member of the German Parliament (2013–2025) ===
In the 2013 national parliamentary election Leikert stood successfully for election to the Bundestag, representing the Hanau electoral district (Wahlkreis 180). She won 44.3% of the first preference votes. It was, as she herself commented to reporters, an unbelievably rapid progression for someone who had only been a party member for slightly more than eighteen months. "I was certainly helped by the [national] political climate" ("Mir hat eindeutig das politische Klima geholfen"). She became a member of the Bundestag Health Committee, where she served as her parliamentary group's rapporteur on organ donation and eHealth. She also became meetings secretary (Schriftführerin) and a deputising member of the Committee for Families, Women and Young people, and of the Committee on Foreign Affairs.

In the 2017 national parliamentary election Leikert successfully defended her parliamentary seat, albeit with a reduced majority. She won only 35.3% of the first preference votes, but this was still comfortably more than the second placed candidate, Sascha Raabe of the SPD. Both candidates saw reductions in their share of the vote, and populist or fringe parties gained vote share, reflecting wider national and international trends. Parliamentary colleagues elected her one of the CDU/CSU alliance's eleven Bundestag deputy chairpersons in January 2018, first under the leadership of Volker Kauder and later Ralph Brinkhaus. Her areas of responsibility within the parliamentary group include policy on Europe, political co-ordination and co-operation with like-minded political parties in other parts of Europe, the European People's Party, the CDU's office in Brussels and human rights.

In the negotiations to form a coalition government with Social Democrats (SPD) and the Christian Social Union in Bavaria (CSU), Leikert was part of her party's delegation.

Since the 2021 elections, Leikert has been a member of the Committee for Families, Women and Youth and of the Committee on Foreign Affairs.

In addition to her committee assignments, Leikert has been an alternate member of the German delegation to the Parliamentary Assembly of the Council of Europe (PACE) since 2022. In the Assembly, she serves on the Committee on Migration, Refugees and Displaced Persons and the Sub-Committee on Refugee and Migrant Children and Young People.

In June 2024, Leikert announced that she would not stand in the 2025 federal elections but instead pause her career in active politics.

== Other activities ==
- Federal Academy for Security Policy (BAKS), Member of the advisory board (since 2022)

== Political positions ==
In June 2017, Leikert voted against her parliamentary group's majority and in favor of Germany's introduction of same-sex marriage.

In 2019, Leikert joined 14 members of her parliamentary group who, in an open letter, called for the party to rally around Chancellor Angela Merkel and party chairwoman Annegret Kramp-Karrenbauer amid criticism voiced by conservatives Friedrich Merz and Roland Koch.

In April 2020, Leikert co-signed – alongside around 50 other members of her parliamentary group – a letter to President of the European Commission Ursula von der Leyen which called on the European Union to take in children who were living in migrant camps across Greece.

Ahead of the 2021 national elections, Leikert endorsed Armin Laschet as the Christian Democrats' joint candidate to succeed Merkel as chancellor.

== Personal life ==
Katja Leikert is married with two daughters, born in 2007 and 2010.
