= Pascal Reddig =

German politician (born 1995)

Pascal Reddig MdB

Member of the Bundestag; for Hanau
- Incumbent
- Assumed office 25 March 2025
- Preceded by: Lennard Oehl

Personal details
- Born: 10 April 1995 (age 31) Gelnhausen, Germany
- Party: Christian Democratic Union
- Education: University of Bayreuth; University of Mainz

Pascal Reddig (born 10 April 1995) is a German lawyer and politician of the Christian Democratic Union (CDU) who was elected as a member of the Bundestag in 2025.

== Early career ==
From 2019 to 2021, Reddig worked as advisor and chief of staff to Katja Leikert at the German Parliament in Berlin.

== Political career ==
Reddig served as chairman of the CDU group in the city council of Hanau from 2021.

In parliament, Reddig has been a member of the Committee on Labour and Social Affairs and the Committee on Cultural Affairs and Media.

In 2025, the government of Chancellor Friedrich Merz appointed Reddig to serve on an expert commission tasked with developing recommendations for a comprehensive reorganization of Germany’s pension system, co-chaired by Constanze Janda and Frank-Jürgen Weise.
