= Heinz Marquardt =

German World War II fighter pilot (1922–2003)

- Marquardt as an Oberfeldwebel
- Born: 29 December 1922; Braunsberg, East Prussia, (now Poland)
- Died: 19 December 2003 (aged 80); Hammersbach
- Burial place: New cemetery in Marköbel, suburb of Hammersbach
- Military career
- Allegiance: Nazi Germany (to 1945); West Germany
- Branch: Luftwaffe; German Air Force
- Service years: 1939–1945; 1956–1973
- Rank: Leutnant (Wehrmacht); Oberstleutnant (Bundeswehr)
- Nickname: "Negus"
- Units: Jagdgeschwader 51; Jagdgeschwader 73
- Conflicts: World War II: Eastern Front
- Awards: Knight's Cross of the Iron Cross
- Other work: Condor

Heinz "Negus" Marquardt (29 December 1922 – 19 December 2003) was a German Luftwaffe fighter ace and recipient of the Knight's Cross of the Iron Cross, the highest award in the military and paramilitary forces of Nazi Germany during World War II. Marquardt was credited with 121 aerial victories—that is, 121 aerial combat encounters resulting in the destruction of the enemy aircraft—with a further 16 unconfirmed victories in 320 combat missions. All but one of his victories were claimed over the Eastern Front.

== World War II ==
Marquardt was born on 29 December 1922 in Braunsberg, present-day Braniewo in Poland, at the time in East Prussia a province of the Weimar Republic's Free State of Prussia. On 15 September 1941, he was posted to the Jagdfliegerschule 5 (JFS 5—5th fighter pilot school), stationed at the Le Havre – Octeville airfield in France. As of 1 February 1942, he served as a fighter pilot instructor and flew a number of operational sorties on the Channel Front with the operational squadron of JFS 5.

=== Eastern Front ===
On 1 August 1943, Marquard was transferred to the 11. Staffel (11th squadron) of Jagdgeschwader 51 "Mölders" (JG 51—51st Fighter Wing) operating on the Eastern Front. His transfer to JG 51 occurred during the Soviet Belgorod-Kharkov Offensive Operation where it supported the 8th Army. The Staffel was commanded by Hauptmann Adolf Borchers and subordinated to IV. Gruppe of JG 51 headed by Major Hans-Ekkehard Bob. According to Obermaier, Marquardt claimed his first aerial victory on 2 October, shooting down an Ilyushin Il-2 ground-attack aircraft.

On 22 June 1944, Soviet forces launched Operation Bagration, the strategic offensive operation against Army Group Centre. In consequence, IV. Gruppe was moved to Mogilev that day and to an airfield named Bayary located 92 kilometers (57 miles) northeast of Minsk and 13 kilometers (8.1 miles) east of Barysaw. Following the German retreat, the Gruppe moved to an airfield at Lida, which is 150 kilometers (93 miles) west of Minsk, on 3 July. On 14 August, Marquardt claimed a Yakovlev Yak-9 fighter near Osowiec Fortress. Later that day, IV. Gruppe retreated to an airfield at Tilsit, present-day Sovetsk located on the south bank of the Neman River. The next day, as part of the group expansion from three Staffeln per Gruppe to four Staffeln per Gruppe, 10. Staffel was re-designated and became the 13. Staffel while 11. Staffel became the 14. Staffel of JG 51. Marquardt was then transferred and served with 13. Staffel which was commanded by Leutnant Peter Kalden. On 28 August, IV. Gruppe moved to Modlin Airfield located approximately 35 kilometers (22 miles) northwest of Warsaw. Here, the Gruppe predominately flew combat missions to the area north and northeast of Warsaw. The next day, Marquardt claimed a Yak-9 fighter shot down northeast of Warsaw. On 10 September, Marquardt was awarded German Cross in Gold (Deutsches Kreuz in Gold). Following a brief period of little combat in central Poland, Marquardt became an "ace-in-a-day" on 7 October, claiming two Il-2 ground-attack aircraft and a Douglas A-20 Havoc bomber, also known as Boston, on the first mission of the day.

Marquard and his Gruppenkommandeur (group commander), Hauptmann Heinz Lange, both received the Knight's Cross of the Iron Cross (Ritterkreuz des Eisernen Kreuzes) on 18 November for 89 and 70 aerial victories respectively. On 14 April 1945, Marquardt was credited with his 100th aerial victory. He was the 102nd Luftwaffe pilot to achieve the century mark. On a transfer flight of new Focke-Wulf Fw 190 D-9 to his unit, he was credited with four aerial victories over Yakovlev Yak-3 on 25 April 1945. On 30 April, Marquardt accidentally ran his Fw 190 D-9 into a drainage ditch on a transfer flight. Due to lack of spare parts, the damage was not reparable and the aircraft was blown up to prevent it from falling to the enemy.

On 1 May 1945 Marquardt became Jagdgeschwader 51's last casualty of the war when he was shot down by Royal Air Force Spitfires north of Berlin. Marquardt had led a flight of six Focke-Wulf Fw 190 D-9 on an escort mission of 12 Fw 190 F-8 ground attack aircraft from Redlin on a mission to Berlin. After completing the mission the aircraft returned to Schwerin. During the landing approach the flight came under attack of 6 Spitfire Mk XIV from No. 41 Squadron. Marquardt ordered his flight to cover the landing of the ground attack fighters while he and his wingman, Feldwebel Radlauer, attacked the Spitfires from below. Marquardt claimed one of the attackers but was shot down as well along with two other Fw 190s. Radlauer saw Marquardt's Fw 190 crash in flames but did not observe any sign of life. Marquardt was initially reported as killed in action but he had bailed out injured and was taken to a hospital in Schwerin, where he was taken prisoner of war shortly after.

== Later life ==
Following World War II, Marquardt served in the newly established German Air Force of West Germany with the rank of Leutnant (Second Lieutenant) on 16 August 1956. He served with Jagdgeschwader 73 (JG 73—73rd Fighter Wing) and Leichtes Kampfgeschwader 42 (LeKG 42—42nd Light Combat Wing). Marquardt retired on 30 September 1973, having risen to the rank of Oberstleutnant (Lieutenant Colonel). Following his retirement, he became good friends with former Flight Lieutenant Peter Cowell who had shot him down on 1 May 1945. Marquardt died on 19 December 2003 in Hammersbach.

== Summary of career ==
=== Aerial victory claims ===
According to US historian David T. Zabecki, Marquardt was credited with 121 aerial victories. His aerial victories were claimed on 320 combat missions. Spick also list him with 121 aerial victories claimed in 320 combat missions, and a mission-to-claim ratio of 2.64. Mathews and Foreman, authors of Luftwaffe Aces — Biographies and Victory Claims, researched the German Federal Archives and state that Marquardt was credited with more than 121 aerial victories, all of which claimed on the Eastern Front.

Victory claims were logged to a map-reference (PQ = Planquadrat), for example "PQ 34 Ost 39551". The Luftwaffe grid map (Jägermeldenetz) covered all of Europe, western Russia and North Africa and was composed of rectangles measuring 15 minutes of latitude by 30 minutes of longitude, an area of about 360 square miles (930 km^{2}). These sectors were then subdivided into 36 smaller units to give a location area 3 km × 4 km (1.9 mi × 2.5 mi) in size.

Chronicle of aerial victories
This and the ♠ (Ace of spades) indicates those aerial victories which made Marquardt an "ace-in-a-day", a term which designates a fighter pilot who has shot down five or more airplanes in a single day. This and the ? (question mark) indicates information discrepancies listed by Prien, Stemmer, Balke, Bock, Mathews and Foreman.
Claim	Date	Time	Type	Location	Claim	Date	Time	Type	Location
– 11. Staffel of Jagdgeschwader 51 –
1	17 October 1943	09:32	Yak-1	southwest of St. Budniza	27	6 July 1944	10:25	Yak-9	PQ 25 Ost 65531; 20 km (12 mi) northeast of Telchje
2	28 October 1943	06:40	Yak-1	west of Pjatichatki	28	6 July 1944	10:29	Yak-9	PQ 25 Ost 65534; 40 km (25 mi) east-southeast of Navahrudak
3	21 November 1943	09:50	Il-2	Loschkarewka	29	9 July 1944	19:13	Yak-9	PQ 25 Ost 54852; 20 km (12 mi) east of Slonim
4	22 November 1943	14:32	Il-2 m.H. (Note: The "m.H." refers to an Ilyushin Il-2 with rear gunner (mit Heckschütze).)	Pavlovskoye	30	9 July 1944	19:17	Yak-9	PQ 25 Ost 54845; 15 km (9.3 mi) west of Baranavichy
5	11 December 1943	11:07	Yak-1	PQ 34 Ost 39551; 35 km (22 mi) west Borovichi	31	17 July 1944	17:47	Yak-9	PQ 25 Ost 41881; 20 km (12 mi) west of Brody
6	10 January 1944	11:19	Il-2 m.H.	PQ 25 Ost 80681; 25 km (16 mi) southeast of Vinnytsia	32	20 July 1944	14:35	Yak-9	PQ 25 Ost 40565; 20 km (12 mi) south-southwest of Ternopil
7	10 January 1944	11:21	Yak-1	PQ 25 Ost 80681; 25 km (16 mi) southeast of Vinnytsia	33	21 July 1944	14:49	Yak-9	PQ 25 Ost 50517; 15 km (9.3 mi) east of Berezhany
8	9 April 1944	13:32	La-5	PQ 25 Ost 50731 southeast of Ternopil	34	24 July 1944	07:46	P-39	PQ 25 Ost 20265; 15 km (9.3 mi) northeast of Sanok
9	29 April 1944	10:30	R-5	PQ 24 Ost 59354; 20 km (12 mi) northeast of Kolomyia	35	31 July 1944	10:35	Yak-9	PQ 25 Ost 36859; 20 km (12 mi) southwest of Kėdainiai
10	29 April 1944	10:31	R-5	PQ 24 Ost 59354; 20 km (12 mi) northeast of Kolomyia	36	31 July 1944	13:16	Yak-9	PQ 25 Ost 46777; 15 km (9.3 mi) west of Ukmergė
11	29 April 1944	10:32	R-5	PQ 24 Ost 59363; 25 km (16 mi) east-northeast of Kolomyia	37	1 August 1944	06:23	Yak-9	PQ 25 Ost 35321; 20 km (12 mi) northwest of Marijampolė
12	2 May 1944	05:44	Yak-9	PQ 25 Ost 40261; 10 km (6.2 mi) north of Zolochiv	38	1 August 1944	10:48	Il-2	PQ 25 Ost 35314; 20 km (12 mi) north-northwest of Marijampolė
13	2 May 1944	05:45	Il-2 m.H.	PQ 25 Ost 50141; 15 km (9.3 mi) northeast of Zolochiv	39	1 August 1944	10:58	Yak-9	PQ 25 Ost 35347; 20 km (12 mi) west-northwest of Marijampolė
14	10 May 1944	07:10	R-5	PQ 24 Ost 59287; 60 km (37 mi) northeast of Kolomyia	40	2 August 1944	08:00	Il-2	PQ 25 Ost 25429; 15 km (9.3 mi) east-southeast of Blumenfeld
15	10 May 1944	07:11	R-5	PQ 24 Ost 59264; 55 km (34 mi) northeast of Kolomyia	41	2 August 1944	08:02	Il-2	PQ 25 Ost 25438; 15 km (9.3 mi) east-southeast of Blumenfeld
16	18 May 1944	08:20	Yak-9	PQ 25 Ost 50474 vicinity of Ternopil	42	4 August 1944	07:52	Yak-9	PQ 25 Ost 36599; 30 km (19 mi) west of Kėdainiai
17	23 May 1944	11:09	La-5	PQ 25 Ost 50386; 25 km (16 mi) west of Ternopil	43	5 August 1944	08:08	Yak-9	PQ 25 Ost 36731; 35 km (22 mi) southeast of Nemakščiai
18	28 May 1944	06:35	La-5	PQ 25 Ost 50512; 15 km (9.3 mi) east of Berezhany	44	5 August 1944	08:10	Yak-9	PQ 25 Ost 36729; 30 km (19 mi) west-southwest of Kėdainiai
19	8 June 1944	11:20	Il-2 m.H.	PQ 25 Ost 50183; 25 km (16 mi) south-southeast of Brody	45	7 August 1944	13:30	Yak-9	PQ 25 Ost 25433; 25 km (16 mi) east-southeast of Blumenfeld
20	8 June 1944	11:23	Il-2 m.H.	PQ 25 Ost 50164; 25 km (16 mi) south-southeast of Brody	46	8 August 1944	11:05	Yak-1	PQ 25 Ost 36544; 20 km (12 mi) east-southeast of Nemakščiai
21	8 June 1944	11:30	Il-2 m.H.	PQ 25 Ost 50168; 25 km (16 mi) east of Zolochiv	47	8 August 1944	11:10	Il-2 m.H.	PQ 25 Ost 36575; 20 km (12 mi) southeast of Nemakščiai
22	17 June 1944	13:21	La-5	PQ 25 Ost 50882; 55 km (34 mi) south-southeast of Ternopil	48	8 August 1944	11:12	Il-2 m.H.	PQ 25 Ost 36573; 20 km (12 mi) southeast of Nemakščiai
23	4 July 1944	20:55	Il-2 m.H.	PQ 25 Ost 65661; 20 km (12 mi) north-northwest of Maladzyechna	49	9 August 1944	11:56	Yak-9	PQ 25 Ost 35388; 25 km (16 mi) west-northwest of Marijampolė
24	4 July 1944	20:57	Il-2 m.H.	PQ 25 Ost 65623; 20 km (12 mi) north-northwest of Maladzyechna	50	9 August 1944	14:51	Yak-9	PQ 25 Ost 35334; 15 km (9.3 mi) north of Marijampolė
25	4 July 1944	20:58	Il-2 m.H.	PQ 25 Ost 65622; 20 km (12 mi) north-northwest of Maladzyechna	51	9 August 1944	14:54	Il-2 m.H.? (Note: According to Mathews and Foreman claimed as a Yakovlev Yak-9.)	PQ 25 Ost 25466; 20 km (12 mi) west of Marijampolė
26	4 July 1944	20:59	Yak-9	PQ 25 Ost 65625; 10 km (6.2 mi) north of Maladzyechna	52	14 August 1944	10:55	Yak-9	PQ 25 Ost 24619; 45 km (28 mi) northeast of Łomża
– 13. Staffel of Jagdgeschwader 51 –
53	16 August 1944	17:22	Yak-9	PQ 25 Ost 26627 vicinity of Nemakščiai	72? (Note: This claim is not listed by Mathews and Foreman.)	13 October 1944	09:26	Il-2 m.H.	PQ 25 Ost 03639
54	17 August 1944	10:51	Yak-9	PQ 25 Ost 26631; 10 km (6.2 mi) east of Nemakščiai	73	13 October 1944	12:11	Yak-9	PQ 25 Ost 13511; 20 km (12 mi) north of Warsaw
55	17 August 1944	10:54	Il-2 m.H.	PQ 25 Ost 26635; 10 km (6.2 mi) east of Nemakščiai	74	13 October 1944	15:26	Boston? (Note: According to Mathews and Foreman claimed as a Ilyushin Il-2.)	PQ 25 Ost 13517; 20 km (12 mi) north of Warsaw
56	29 August 1944	09:56	Yak-9	PQ 25 Ost 13523; 25 km (16 mi) north-northeast of Warsaw	75	15 October 1944	11:42	Yak-9	PQ 25 Ost 13573, Jabłonna; 15 km (9.3 mi) north of Warsaw
57	1 September 1944	13:44	Yak-9	PQ 25 Ost 13519; 25 km (16 mi) north-northeast of Warsaw	76	15 October 1944	11:46	Yak-9	PQ 25 Ost 13546; 15 km (9.3 mi) north of Warsaw
58	4 September 1944	17:18	Yak-9	PQ 25 Ost 13259; 15 km (9.3 mi) south of Ostrołęka	77	17 October 1944	14:52	Yak-9	PQ 25 Ost 13341; 15 km (9.3 mi) southwest of Modlin
59	4 September 1944	17:21	Il-2	PQ 25 Ost 13219; 20 km (12 mi) northwest of Ostrów	78	17 October 1944	14:53? (Note: According to Mathews and Foreman claimed at 14:55.)	Yak-9	PQ 25 Ost 03446; 20 km (12 mi) east of Nasielsk
60	4 September 1944	17:25	Yak-9	PQ 25 Ost 13245; 15 km (9.3 mi) northwest of Ostrów	79	19 October 1944	10:12	Yak-9	PQ 25 Ost 13344; 20 km (12 mi) northeast of Nasielsk
61	5 September 1944	18:42	La-5	PQ 25 Ost 13344; 20 km (12 mi) east of Nasielsk	80	19 October 1944	10:14	Yak-9	PQ 25 Ost 13347; 20 km (12 mi) east of Nasielsk
62	11 September 1944	15:23	Yak-9	PQ 25 Ost 13722; 15 km (9.3 mi) east of Warsaw	81	19 October 1944	10:15	Yak-9	PQ 25 Ost 13378; 20 km (12 mi) east of Nasielsk
63	15 September 1944	12:26	P-39	PQ 35 Ost 03699; 10 km (6.2 mi) west of Warsaw	82	21 October 1944	15:15	Yak-9	PQ 25 Ost 13316; 20 km (12 mi) northeast of Nasielsk
64♠	7 October 1944	12:54	Il-2 m.H.	PQ 25 Ost 13373; 15 km (9.3 mi) southwest of Modlin	83	23 October 1944	09:25	Il-2 m.H.	PQ 25 Ost 03493; 15 km (9.3 mi) northwest of Warsaw
65♠	7 October 1944	12:58	Il-2 m.H.	PQ 25 Ost 13348; 15 km (9.3 mi) southwest of Modlin	84♠	24 October 1944	08:40	P-39	PQ 25 Ost 03469; 15 km (9.3 mi) southwest of Modlin
66♠	7 October 1944	13:04	Boston	PQ 25 Ost 13555; 15 km (9.3 mi) southwest of Modlin	85♠	24 October 1944	11:18	Yak-9	PQ 25 Ost 03498; 10 km (6.2 mi) northwest of Warsaw
67♠	7 October 1944	16:10	Yak-9	PQ 25 Ost 03461; 15 km (9.3 mi) southwest of Modlin	86♠	24 October 1944	13:52	Il-2 m.H.	PQ 25 Ost 13171; 30 km (19 mi) east of Ciechanów
68♠	7 October 1944	16:11	Yak-9	PQ 25 Ost 03465; 20 km (12 mi) east of Nasielsk	87♠	24 October 1944	13:54	Il-2 m.H.	PQ 25 Ost 13147; 30 km (19 mi) east of Ciechanów
69♠	7 October 1944	16:14	Yak-9	PQ 25 Ost 03469; 20 km (12 mi) east of Nasielsk	88♠	24 October 1944	13:57	Il-2 m.H.	PQ 25 Ost 13142; 25 km (16 mi) northeast of Nasielsk
70♠	7 October 1944	16:16	Yak-9	PQ 25 Ost 03463; 20 km (12 mi) east-southeast of Nasielsk	89	25 October 1944	12:23	Yak-9	PQ 25 Ost 13177; 25 km (16 mi) northeast of Nasielsk
71♠	7 October 1944	16:17	Il-2	PQ 25 Ost 03567; 15 km (9.3 mi) northeast of Warsaw					
According to Mathews and Foreman, aerial victories 89 to 98 were not documented. The author Prien, Stemmer, Balke and Bock state that the aerial victory records of IV. Gruppe dated later than November 1944 are incomplete.
99	14 April 1945	09:00+	Yak-3		108	18 April 1945	—	Yak-3	
100	14 April 1945	09:00+	Yak-3		109	18 April 1945	—	Il-2	
101	15 April 1945	—	P-39			24 April 1945	—	Yak-3	
102	15 April 1945	—	P-39			24 April 1945	—	Yak-3	
103	15 April 1945	—	Yak-3			24 April 1945	—	Yak-3	
104	16 April 1945	—	Yak-3			24 April 1945	—	Yak-3	
105	16 April 1945	—	Yak-3			27 April 1945	—	Yak-3	
106	18 April 1945	—	Il-2		120	29 April 1945	—	Il-2	
107	18 April 1945	—	Yak-3		121	1 May 1945	—	Spitfire	Lake Schwerin

=== Awards ===
- Iron Cross (1939) 2nd and 1st Class
- Honor Goblet of the Luftwaffe (26 July 1944)
- German Cross in Gold on 10 September 1944 as Oberfeldwebel in the 10./Jagdgeschwader 51
- Knight's Cross of the Iron Cross on 18 November 1944 as Fahnenjunker-Oberfeldwebel and pilot in the 13./Jagdgeschwader 51 "Mölders" (Note: According to Scherzer as Oberfeldwebel in the 13./Jagdgeschwader 51 "Mölders".)
