= Richard Bayha =

German politician (1929–1993)

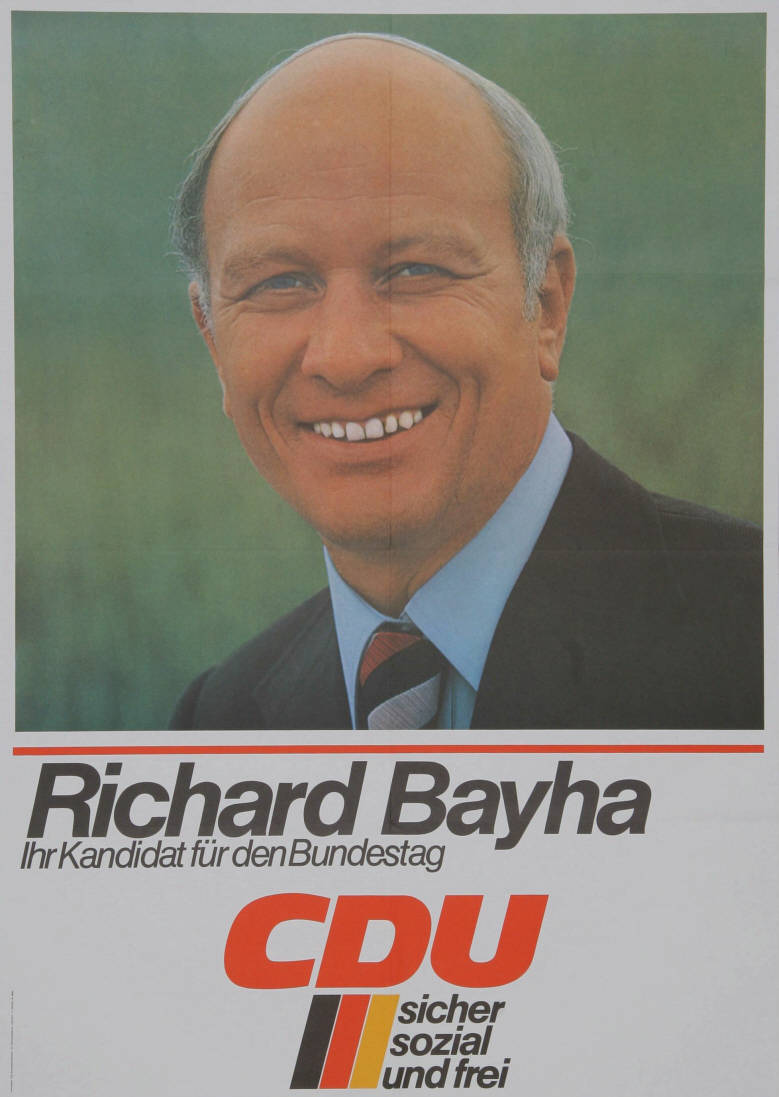
- Candidate poster of Richard Bayhas for the 1976 federal election

Member of the Bundestag; from Hesse
- In office 14 December 1976 – 3 November 1993
- Preceded by: Multi-member district
- Succeeded by: Norbert Herr
- Constituency: State list (1976–1983); Hanau (1983–1993)

Member of the Landtag of Hesse; for Wahlkreis 41
- In office 1 December 1970 – 13 December 1976
- Preceded by: Erwin Lang
- Succeeded by: Martin Trageser

Personal details
- Born: 15 March 1929 Altenhaßlau, Germany
- Died: 3 November 1993 (aged 64) Bonn, Germany
- Party: Christian Democratic Union
- Children: 3
- Occupation: Farmer

Richard Bayha (15 March 1929 – 3 November 1993) was a German politician of the Christian Democratic Union (CDU) and former member of the German Bundestag.

== Life ==
Bayha, who joined the CDU in 1954, was chairman of the agricultural policy committee of the Hessian state association from 1972. From 1987 until his death, he was chairman of the Federal Committee on Agricultural Policy of the federal party.

Bayha was a municipal representative in Altenhaßlau from 1956 to 1968. From 1964 to 1974 he was a member of the district council of Gelnhausen. From 1970 to 1976 he was a member of the Hessian State Parliament, where he was Chairman of the Committee for Agriculture and Forestry from 1974 to 1976. In 1976 he first entered the Bundestag via the Hesse state list, later as a direct candidate for the Hanau constituency. He was a member of parliament until his death.

== Literature ==
Herbst, Ludolf; Jahn, Bruno (2002). Vierhaus, Rudolf (ed.). Biographisches Handbuch der Mitglieder des Deutschen Bundestages. 1949–2002 [Biographical Handbook of the Members of the German Bundestag. 1949–2002] (in German). München: De Gruyter - De Gruyter Saur. p. 1715. ISBN 978-3-11-184511-1.
