= Flörsheim am Main =

- Town
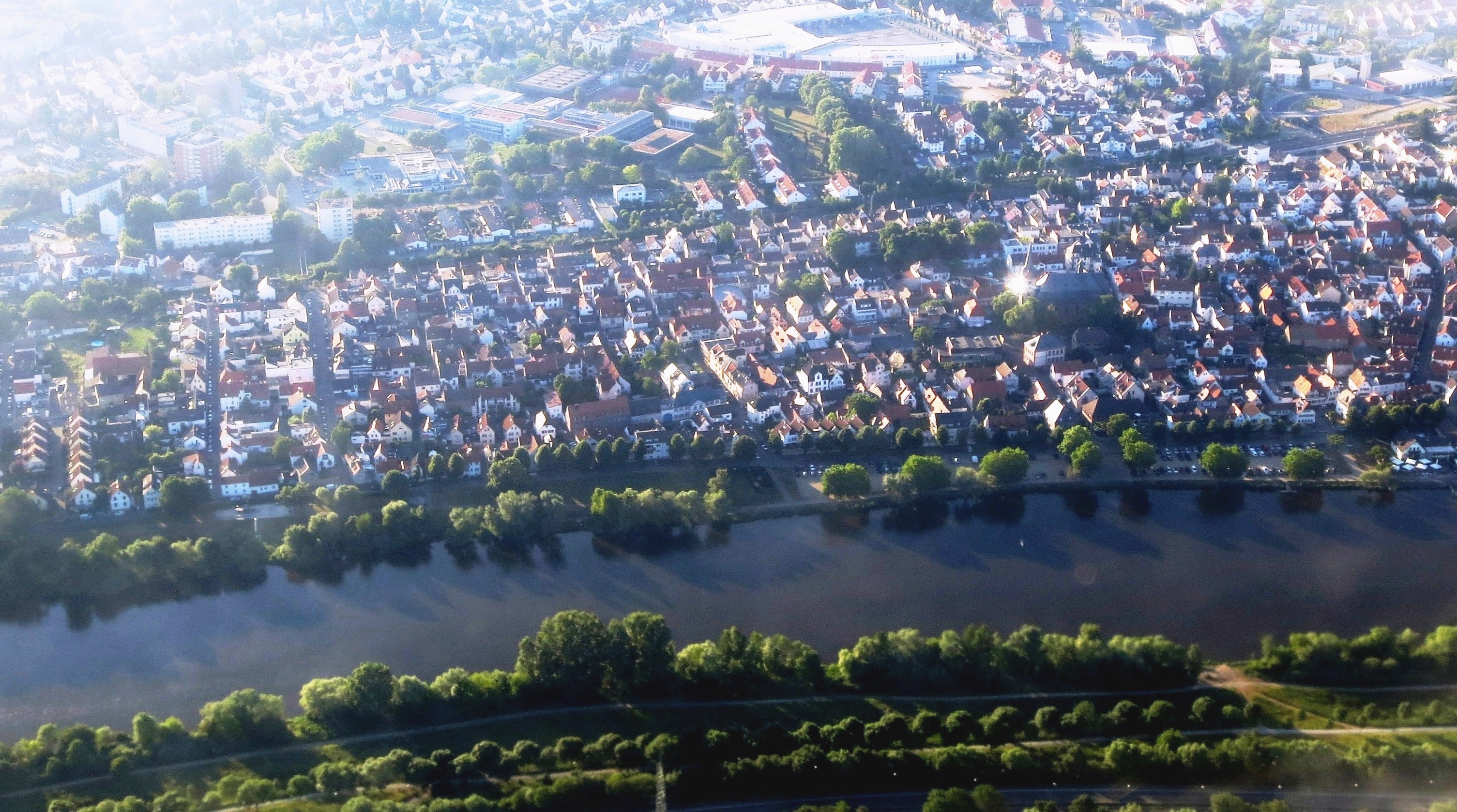
- Aerial view

- Coat of arms

- Location of Flörsheim am Main within Main-Taunus-Kreis district
- Interactive map of Flörsheim am Main
- Location within Germany Location within Hesse
- Coordinates: 50°01′N 08°26′E
- Country: Germany
- State: Hesse
- Admin. region: Darmstadt
- District: Main-Taunus-Kreis

Government
  - Mayor (2018–24): Bernd Blisch

Area
  - Total: 22.99 km^{2} (8.88 sq mi)
- Elevation: 90 m (300 ft)

Population (2025-12-31)
  - Total: 21,257
  - Density: 924.6/km^{2} (2,395/sq mi)
- Time zone: UTC+01:00 (CET)
  - Summer (DST): UTC+02:00 (CEST)
- Postal codes: 65439
- Dialling codes: 06145
- Vehicle registration: MTK
- Website: www.floersheim-main.de

Flörsheim am Main (German pronunciation: [ˈfløːɐ̯shaɪm ʔam ˈmaɪn], lit. 'Flörsheim on the Main') is a town in the Main-Taunus district, in Hesse, Germany. It is situated on the right bank of the River Main, opposite Rüsselsheim, 12 km east of Mainz and 21 km west of Frankfurt.

== Geography ==
=== Population ===
- Flörsheim (11,950 Residents)
- Weilbach (3,831 Residents) (independent district)
- Wicker (3,472 Residents) (independent district)
- Bad Weilbach
- Keramag/Falkenberg (706 Residents)

As of 31 July 2005

== Town partnerships ==
Flörsheim has partnerships with:

- Pyskowice, Poland since 2005
- Pérols, France since 1992
- Güzelbahçe, Turkey since 2011

== People from Flörsheim ==
- Abdelaziz Ahanfouf (born 14 January 1978), former German-Moroccan football player, eight international matches for Morocco.
- Georg Badeck, former Member of Landtag, CDU, died 2004
- Dr Hugo Noerdlinger, Jewish chemical factory owner and inventor, died 1917. Nazis seized the factory from his two sons who died in Nazi concentration camps and are commemorated on the Holocaust Memorial wall in Wiesbaden. A mall has been built over the factory site.
- Dr. Max Schohl (died 1943, in Auschwitz), Jewish chemical factory owner and patron.
- Deniz Yücel (born 10 September 1973), journalist and publisher, best known for his works in Die Tageszeitung and Die Welt
- Cameron Richardson, a German-born British racing driver competing in the Mini Challenge UK for NAPA Racing UK.

== Honorary citizen ==
- 1949: Georg von Opel (1912–1971), car operator and sportsman
- 1955: Jakob Altmaier (1889–1963), German politician (SPD), MdB, journalist, local columnist under the pseudonym "Gänsekippelschorsch"

== Events ==
In the fall the Flörsheimer Kerb is celebrated along the Main River. It was created in relation to the Kirchweihfest in the St. Gallus Church in Flörsheim. It is a small fair with a few rides and booths to eat.

Furthermore, there is a weekend-long open-air concert once a year called Flörsheim Open Air. It is a little festival underneath the Main river's bridge that leads to Rüsselsheim. In 2007 it will be the 32nd festival.

There is also Flörsheims Carnival parade that goes through Flörsheim on Carnival Sunday. It attracts many thousands of spectators. In 2007 it attracted over 80,000 people.

== Economy ==
The Fraport subsidiary Fraport Immobilienservice und -entwicklungs GmbH & Co. KG has its head office in Flörsheim am Main.

== Culture and sport clubs ==
- Ball-Sport-Club 1985 Flörsheim e.V.
- ESV Blaugold Flörsheim e.V.; seit 1953, Sportarten Kegeln und Darts
- FC Germania 1908 Weilbach e.V.
- Flörsheimer Carneval Verein 1928 e.V.
- Flörsheimer Narren Club 1962
- Flörsheimer Ruderverein 08 e.V.
- Flörsheimer Sammlerverein Untermain e.V.; Briefmarken, Briefe, Postkarten, Münzen, Euromünzen
- Kerbeborsch 6091 Weilbach e.V.
- Regionalpark Rhein-Main
- Reitsportverein Flörsheim 1927 e.V.
- Schützengesellschaft 1906 e.V. Flörsheim am Main
- SV 09 Flörsheim
- SV Edelweiß 1899 e.V. (Schützenverein)
- TV Wicker e.V.
- Ata Moschee, an Ahmadiyya mosque
