= Manfred Kanther =

German politician (born 1939)

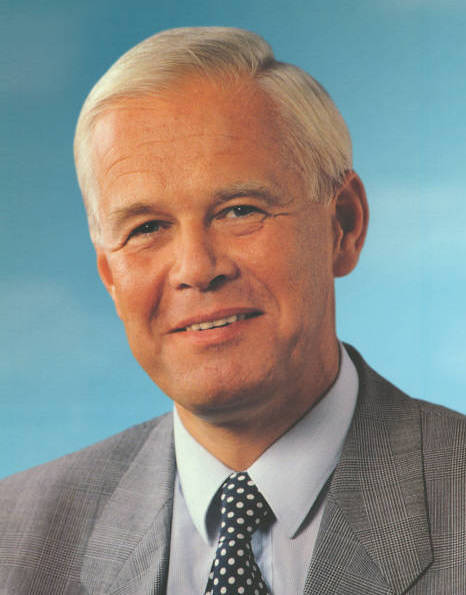
- Kanther in 1995

Minister of the Interior
- In office 7 July 1993 – 26 October 1998
- Chancellor: Helmut Kohl
- Preceded by: Rudolf Seiters
- Succeeded by: Otto Schily

Leader of the Christian Democratic Union in Hesse
- In office 8 June 1991 – 24 January 1998
- Managing Director: Siegbert Seitz
- Preceded by: Walter Wallmann
- Succeeded by: Roland Koch

Member of the Bundestag; from Hesse
- In office 10 November 1994 – 25 January 2000
- Preceded by: Norbert Herr
- Succeeded by: Helmut Heiderich
- Constituency: Hanau (1994–1998); State list (1998–2000)

Member of the Landtag of Hesse
- In office 1 December 1974 – 12 July 1993
- Preceded by: Esther-Maria Mikfeld
- Succeeded by: Heiner Hofsommer
- Constituency: Wahlkreis 26 (1974–1983); Wiesbaden I (1983–1993)

Personal details
- Born: 26 May 1939 (age 87) Schweidnitz, Silesia, Germany
- Party: Christian Democratic Union (since 1958)
- Children: 6
- Education: Marburg University; University of Bonn
- Occupation: Stadtoberrechtsrat

Manfred Kanther (born 26 May 1939) is a German conservative politician and was Minister of the Interior of the Federal Republic of Germany from 1993 to 1998. He has been a member of the CDU (since 1958).

== Life and education ==
Kanther was born in Schweidnitz, Silesia. After passing his Abitur in 1958, he studied law in Marburg and Bonn, finishing in 1966. During his studies, he became a member of the fraternity Corps Guestphalia Marburg (today called Corps Guestphalia et Suevoborussia Marburg). From 1967 to 1970, Kanther held the position of Stadtoberrechtsrat in Plettenberg.

Kanther is married and has six children.

== Political life ==
Kanther was a member of the Hessian state parliament from 1974 to 1993. In July 1993 he resigned from the Hessian Landtag and assumed as Minister of the Interior as the successor of Rudolf Seiters. The same year he ordered the prohibition of the Kurdistan Workers' Party (PKK) for attacks against Turkish facilities. During his tenure he had to deal with violence of the Red Army Faction and opposed the dual citizenship. In 1994, he was elected into the Bundestag as representative for Hanau ballot. The Government of Helmut Kohl was narrowly re-elected and he assumed a second term as Minister of the Interior. He was involved in reforms for the policy regarding the asylum seekers and a for foreigners minor to sixteen years old, a compulsory visa was introduced. He re-entered the Bundestag in 1998 via the CDU's statewide candidate ballot.

Manfred Kanther was involved in the 2000 donation scandal of the Hessian CDU and stepped down from the Bundestag in January 2000. In April 2005, Kanther was sentenced to 18 months on probation by the Landgericht Wiesbaden for acting unfaithfully. The Bundesgerichtshof, however, declared the sentence void in late 2006 and sent the case back to the Landgericht Wiesbaden for further hearings. His sentence was subsequently reduced to a fine of €54,000.

Political offices
Preceded by Rudolf Seiters	Minister of the Interior; 1993–1998	Succeeded by Otto Schily
