= Niederdorfelden =

- Municipality
- Coat of arms

- Location of Niederdorfelden within Main-Kinzig-Kreis district
- Interactive map of Niederdorfelden
- Location within Germany Location within Hesse
- Coordinates: 50°11′42″N 08°48′00″E
- Country: Germany
- State: Hesse
- Admin. region: Darmstadt
- District: Main-Kinzig-Kreis

Government
  - Mayor (2017–23): Klaus Büttner (SPD)

Area
  - Total: 6.55 km^{2} (2.53 sq mi)
- Elevation: 111 m (364 ft)

Population (2025-12-31)
  - Total: 4,276
  - Density: 653/km^{2} (1,690/sq mi)
- Time zone: UTC+01:00 (CET)
  - Summer (DST): UTC+02:00 (CEST)
- Postal codes: 61138
- Dialling codes: 06101
- Vehicle registration: MKK
- Website: www.niederdorfelden.de

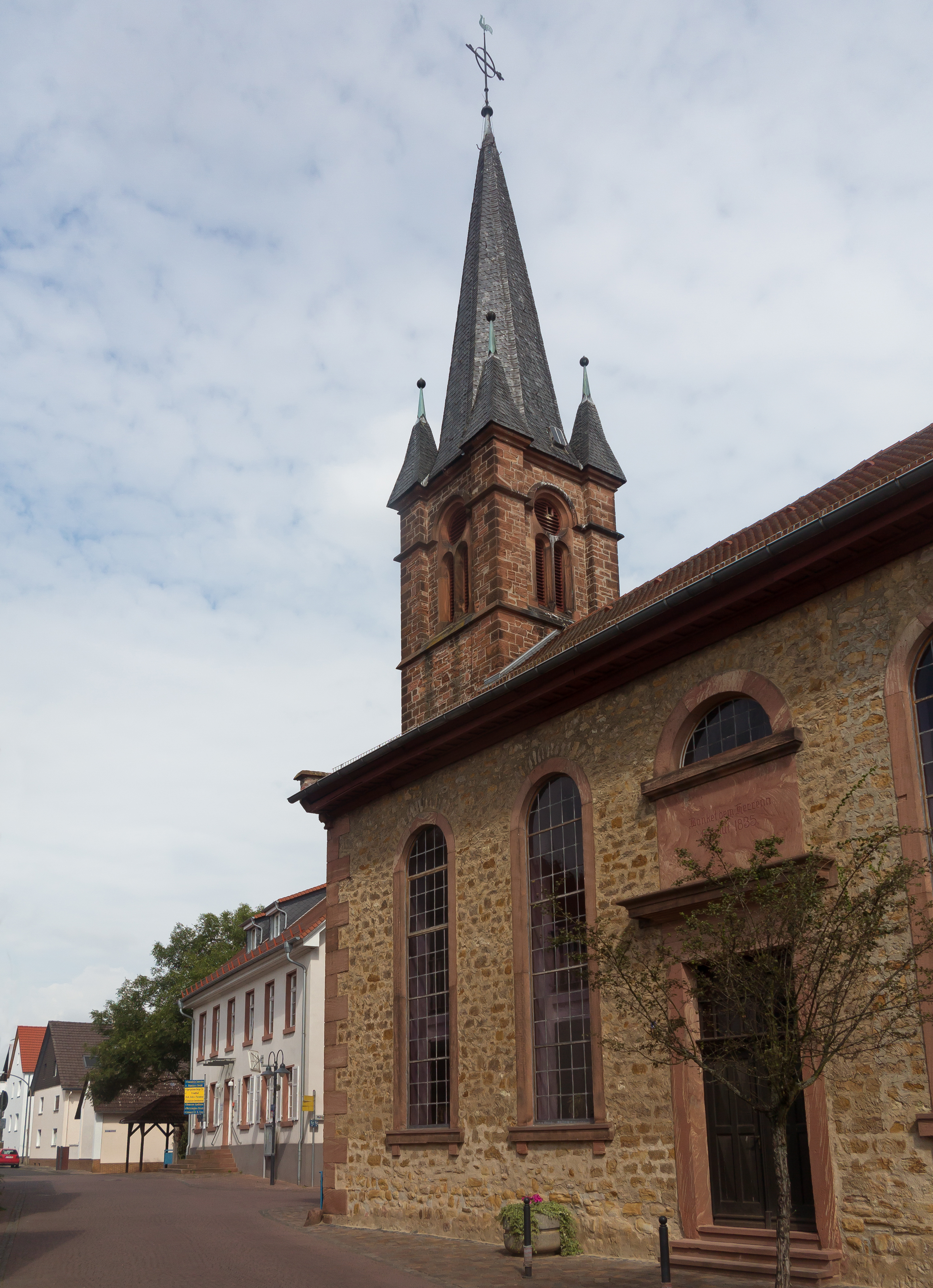
Church Niederdorfelden

Niederdorfelden is a municipality in the Main-Kinzig district, in Hesse, Germany.

== Town partnerships ==
- Saint-Sever-Calvados, France
