= Jakob Altmaier =

German-Jewish politician, member of parliament (1889–1963)

Member of the Bundestag; for Hanau
- In office 7 September 1949 – 8 February 1963
- Preceded by: Constituency established
- Succeeded by: Gerhard Flämig

Personal details
- Born: 23 November 1889 Flörsheim, Germany
- Died: 8 February 1963 (aged 73) Bonn, West Germany
- Party: Social Democratic

Jakob Altmaier (23 November 1889 – 8 February 1963) was a German journalist and a politician in the Social Democratic Party of Germany. He was one of few German Jews who returned to Germany after World War II and became active in politics.

== Early life ==
During World War I, Altmaier volunteered for the Germany army and was severely wounded. In 1918, he participated in the German revolution that resulted in the establishment of the Weimar Republic.

From 1917 to 1919, he was the editor of the Frankfurt paper the Volksstimme, and throughout the 1920s he continued to work as a journalist for various papers, including the Manchester Guardian, and for the Social Democratic Press Agency. As a foreign correspondent, he reported from Belgrade, Paris, and London. With the rise of the Nazi party in 1933, he fled to Paris. After the outbreak of war, he went to the Balkans, Spain, and finally to northern Africa, where was associated with British forces. Until 1948, he was a correspondent for two social-democratic newspapers.

Altmaier lost over 20 relatives during the Holocaust.

== Political career ==
In 1949, Altmaier returned to Germany. He was a member of the post-World War II Bundestag from its inception in 1949 until his death, as the Hanau representative. He was intimately involved with the 1952 reparation treaty between West Germany and Israel. Altmaier was also a member of the Parliamentary Assembly of the Council of Europe from 1950 until his death.

== Honors ==
The Jakob-Altmaier street in Hanau as well as Altmaier street in Flörsheim am Main are named after Altmaier. The city of Flörsheim made him an honored citizen.
