= Hammersbach =

Municipality in Hesse, Germany

- Municipality
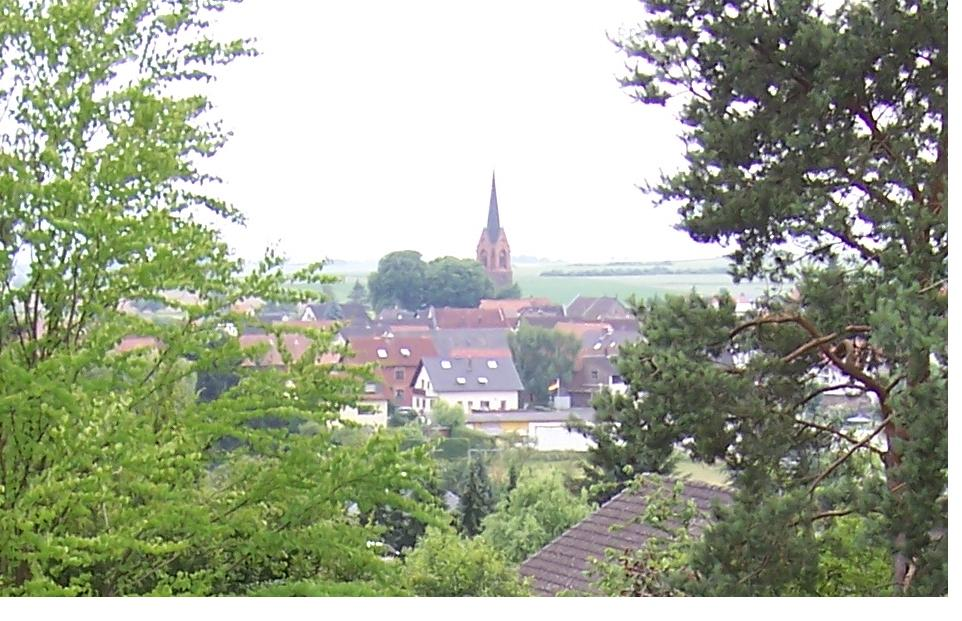
- View of Hammersbach

- Coat of arms

- Location of Hammersbach within Main-Kinzig-Kreis district
- Interactive map of Hammersbach
- Location within Germany Location within Hesse
- Coordinates: 50°13′N 08°59′E
- Country: Germany
- State: Hesse
- Admin. region: Darmstadt
- District: Main-Kinzig-Kreis
- Subdivisions: 3 districts

Government
  - Mayor (2022–28): Michael Göllner (SPD)

Area
  - Total: 20.15 km^{2} (7.78 sq mi)
- Elevation: 135–160 m (443–525 ft)

Population (2025-12-31)
  - Total: 4,790
  - Density: 238/km^{2} (616/sq mi)
- Time zone: UTC+01:00 (CET)
  - Summer (DST): UTC+02:00 (CEST)
- Postal codes: 63546
- Dialling codes: 06185
- Vehicle registration: MKK
- Website: www.hammersbach.de

Hammersbach is a municipality in the district of Main-Kinzig-Kreis, in Hesse, Germany.

== Location ==
Hammersbach is located near Frankfurt am Main. Since 2007 Hammersbach has an official connection to the motorway A45 that has been planned for a long time. Prior to that, it was necessary to use the Raststätte Langen-Bergheim to get access the motorway.

== Constituent communities ==
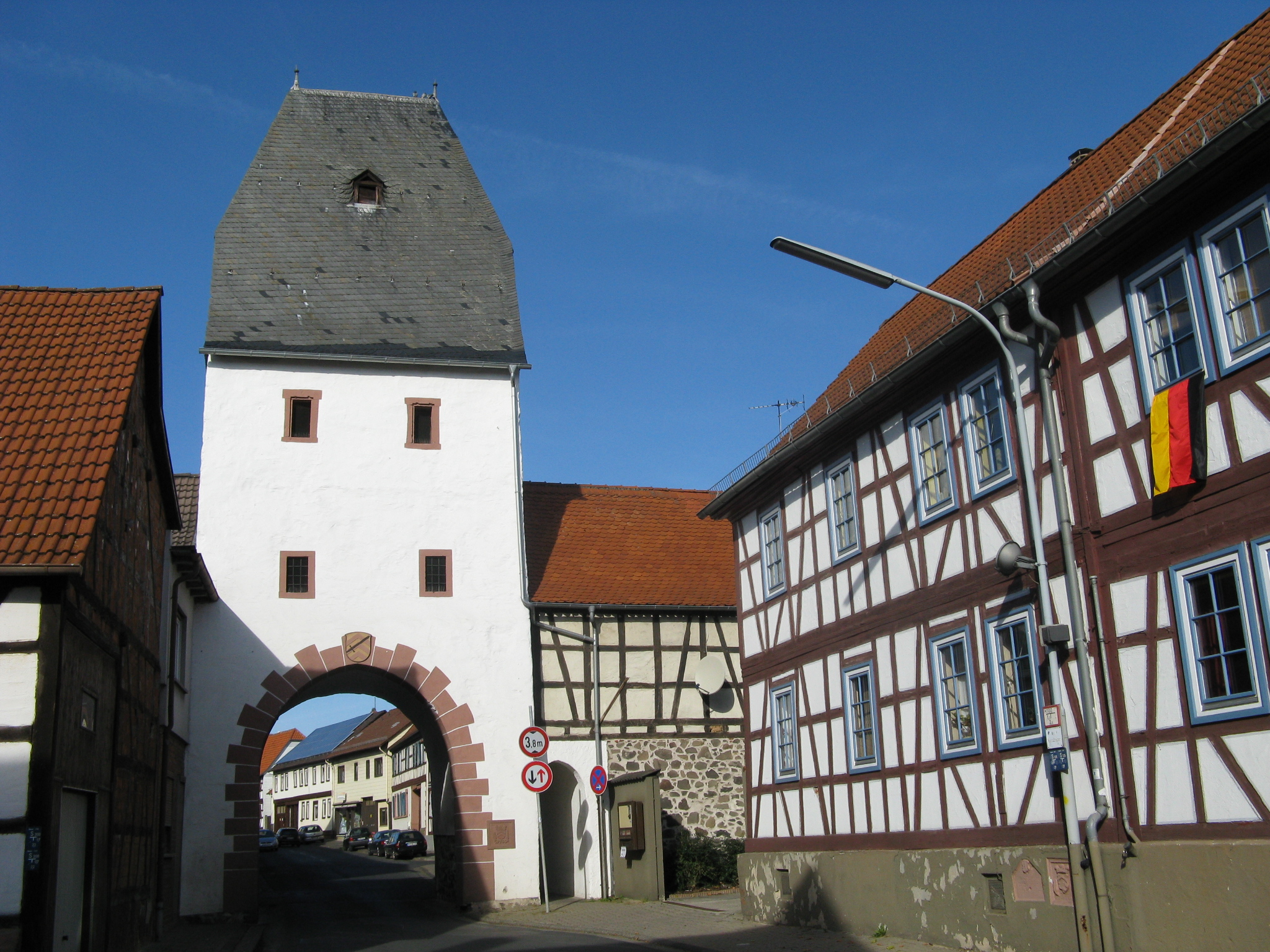
Untertor of Marköbel

It consists of two villages: Marköbel and Langen-Bergheim. Only Marköbel once belonged to the Roman Empire. Parts of the Limes were found there recently.

== Culture and sightseeing ==
Hammersbach has many beautiful old houses in the town center. The elementary school (Astrid-Lindgren-Schule) of Hammersbach can be seen easily from the fields around the village, because of the cone-shaped roof.
