= Sascha Raabe =

German politician (born 1968)

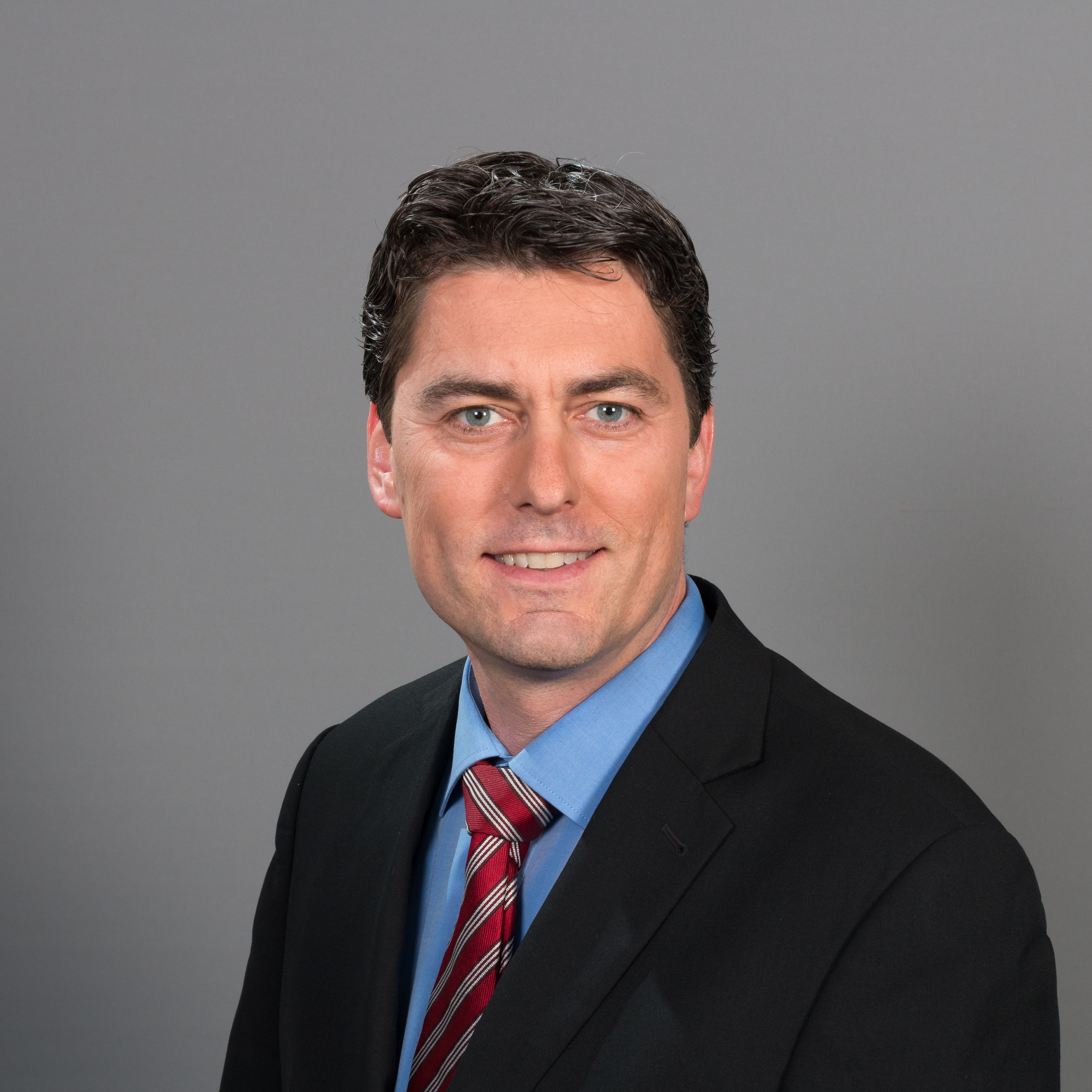
- Raabe in 2014

Member of the Bundestag; from Hesse
- In office 17 October 2002 – 26 October 2021
- Preceded by: Bernd Reuter
- Succeeded by: Multi-member district
- Constituency: Hanau (2002–2009); State list (2009–2021)

Personal details
- Born: Sascha Markus Raabe; 10 June 1968 (age 58) Frankfurt, West Germany
- Party: Social Democratic
- Education: Goethe University Frankfurt

Sascha Raabe (born 10 June 1968) is a German politician of the Social Democratic Party (SPD) who served as a member of the Bundestag from the state of Hesse from 2002 until 2021. Since 2024, he works for the United Nations Industrial Development Organization (UNIDO) and heads UNIDO's Global Alliance for Responsible and Green Minerals.

== Political career ==
Raabe became member of the Bundestag in the 2002 German federal election. Throughout his time in parliament, he served on the Committee on Economic Cooperation and Development. In 2009, he also joined the Subcommittee on the United Nations, International Organizations and Globalization. From 2014 until 2015, he was his parliamentary group's spokesperson on development policy.

In addition to his committee assignments, Raabe was part of the German Parliamentary Friendship Group for Relations with the States of Central America.

In June 2018, Raabe announced that he would not stand in the 2021 federal elections but instead resign from active politics by the end of the parliamentary term.

== Other activities ==
- German Institute for Development Evaluation (DEval), Member of the Advisory Board (since 2012)
- German Foundation for World Population (DSW), Member of the Parliamentary Advisory Board (–2021)
- German Development Service (DED), Member of the Supervisory Board (2009–2010)
