= Gutsbezirk Spessart =

Unincorporated area in Main-Kinzig-Kreis in Hesse, Germany

Location of Gutsbezirks Spessart in Main-Kinzig-Kreis

Gutsbezirk Spessart is a rugged unincorporated area in the Main-Kinzig-Kreis in southeast Hesse, Germany. It represents a separate district (name: Spessart, Gmk. No. 61032).
