= Gründau =

Municipality in Hesse, Germany

- Municipality
- Coat of arms

- Location of Gründau within Main-Kinzig-Kreis district
- Interactive map of Gründau
- Location within Germany Location within Hesse
- Coordinates: 50°13′N 09°09′E
- Country: Germany
- State: Hesse
- Admin. region: Darmstadt
- District: Main-Kinzig-Kreis
- Subdivisions: 7 districts

Government
  - Mayor (2019–25): Gerald Helfrich

Area
  - Total: 67.64 km^{2} (26.12 sq mi)
- Elevation: 135 m (443 ft)

Population (2025-12-31)
  - Total: 14,535
  - Density: 214.9/km^{2} (556.6/sq mi)
- Time zone: UTC+01:00 (CET)
  - Summer (DST): UTC+02:00 (CEST)
- Postal codes: 63584
- Dialling codes: 06058, 06051 (Lieblos / Rothenbergen)
- Vehicle registration: MKK
- Website: www.gruendau.de

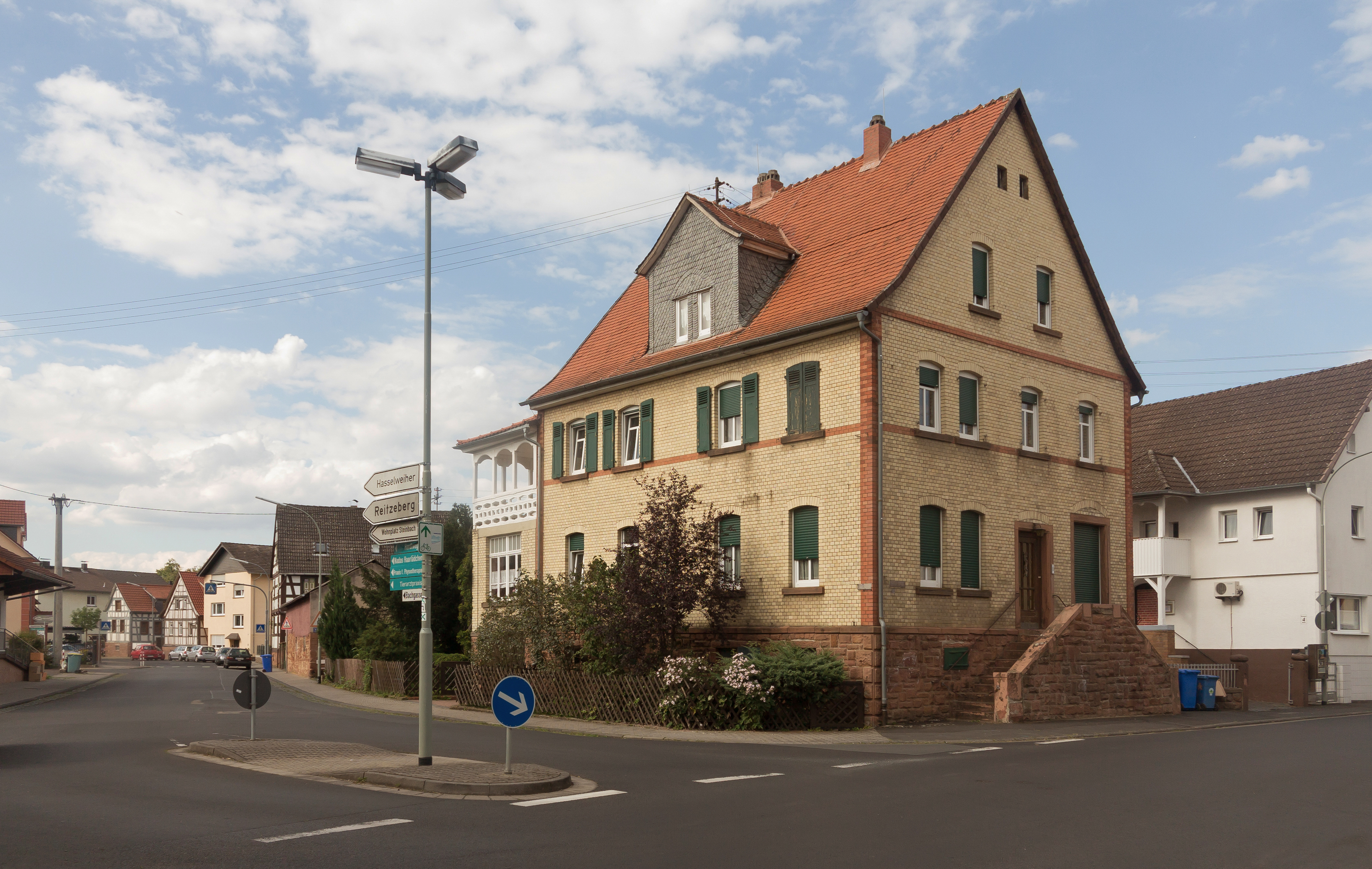
Gründau, view to a street: Bachgasse-Hain Gründauer Strasse

Gründau (German pronunciation: [ˈɡʁyːndaʊ]) is a municipality in the district Main-Kinzig, in Hesse, Germany.

== Geography ==
=== Neighbouring places ===
Gründau is located near Gelnhausen and Büdingen. Frankfurt am Main, the largest city in Hesse, is located in a distance of about 50 kilometres (30 mi).

=== Division of the municipality ===
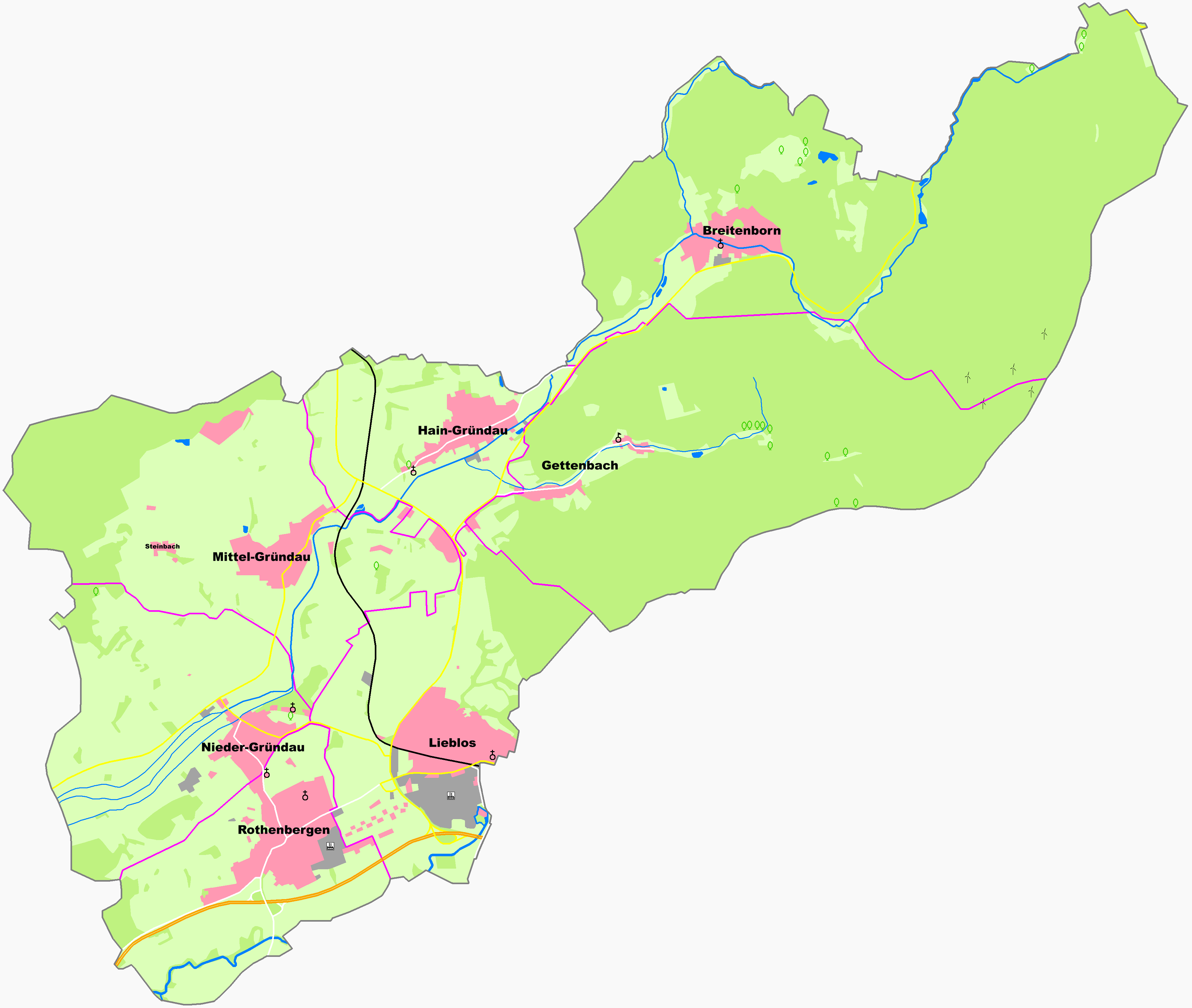
Constituent communities

Gründau is a municipality that consists of seven villages, with a population of 14,653 in total (populations as of December 2021):

- Lieblos (pop. 3,761)
- Rothenbergen (pop. 3,979)
- Niedergründau (pop. 1,806)
- Mittel-Gründau (pop. 2,165)
- Hain-Gründau (pop. 1,753)
- Breitenborn (pop. 1,089)
- Gettenbach (pop. 461)

== History ==
Most of the villages are mentioned in church registers since the 11th century.

== Religious affiliation ==
- 54.1% Protestants
- 18.9% Catholics
- 27% other faiths

== Twin towns ==
- Laussonne, Département Haute-Loire (43), Auvergne, France
- Neugersdorf, Saxony (Sachsen), Germany
