= Neuberg, Hesse =

Neuberg
- Municipality
- Coat of arms

- Location of Neuberg within Main-Kinzig-Kreis district
- Interactive map of Neuberg
- Location within Germany Location within Hesse
- Coordinates: 50°12′N 08°59′E
- Country: Germany
- State: Hesse
- Admin. region: Darmstadt
- District: Main-Kinzig-Kreis
- Subdivisions: 2 districts

Government
  - Mayor (2021–27): Jörn Schachtner (SPD)

Area
  - Total: 10.55 km^{2} (4.07 sq mi)
- Elevation: 122–189 m (400–620 ft)

Population (2025-12-31)
  - Total: 5,403
  - Density: 512.1/km^{2} (1,326/sq mi)
- Time zone: UTC+01:00 (CET)
  - Summer (DST): UTC+02:00 (CEST)
- Postal codes: 63543
- Dialling codes: 06183
- Vehicle registration: MKK
- Website: www.neuberg.eu

Neuberg (German pronunciation: [ˈnɔʏbɛʁk]) is a municipality in the Main-Kinzig district, in Hesse, Germany.
