= Bruchköbel =

- Town
- Coat of arms

- Location of Bruchköbel within Main-Kinzig-Kreis district
- Interactive map of Bruchköbel
- Location within Germany Location within Hesse
- Coordinates: 50°11′N 08°55′E
- Country: Germany
- State: Hesse
- Admin. region: Darmstadt
- District: Main-Kinzig-Kreis
- Subdivisions: 5 districts

Government
  - Mayor (2019–25): Sylvia Braun (FDP)

Area
  - Total: 29.69 km^{2} (11.46 sq mi)
- Elevation: 113 m (371 ft)

Population (2025-12-31)
  - Total: 20,347
  - Density: 685.3/km^{2} (1,775/sq mi)
- Time zone: UTC+01:00 (CET)
  - Summer (DST): UTC+02:00 (CEST)
- Postal codes: 63486
- Dialling codes: 06181, 06183, 06185
- Vehicle registration: MKK, GN, HU, SLÜ
- Website: www.bruchkoebel.de

Bruchköbel (German pronunciation: [ˈbʁʊxˌkøːbl̩]) is a town in the Main-Kinzig district, in Hesse, Germany. It is situated about 19 km (12 mi) northeast of Frankfurt. It has a population of 20.894 (decembre 3, 2023).
