= Langenselbold =

- Town
- Coat of arms

- Location of Langenselbold within Main-Kinzig-Kreis district
- Interactive map of Langenselbold
- Location within Germany Location within Hesse
- Coordinates: 50°11′N 09°02′E
- Country: Germany
- State: Hesse
- Admin. region: Darmstadt
- District: Main-Kinzig-Kreis

Government
  - Mayor (2020–26): Timo Greuel (SPD)

Area
  - Total: 26.23 km^{2} (10.13 sq mi)
- Elevation: 120–200 m (390–660 ft)

Population (2025-12-31)
  - Total: 14,367
  - Density: 547.7/km^{2} (1,419/sq mi)
- Time zone: UTC+01:00 (CET)
  - Summer (DST): UTC+02:00 (CEST)
- Postal codes: 63505
- Dialling codes: 06184
- Vehicle registration: MKK
- Website: www.langenselbold.de

Langenselbold (German pronunciation: [laŋənˈzɛlbɔlt]) is a town in the Main-Kinzig district, in Hesse, Germany. It is situated on the river Kinzig, 10 km east of Hanau. In 2009, the town hosted the 49th Hessentag state festival.

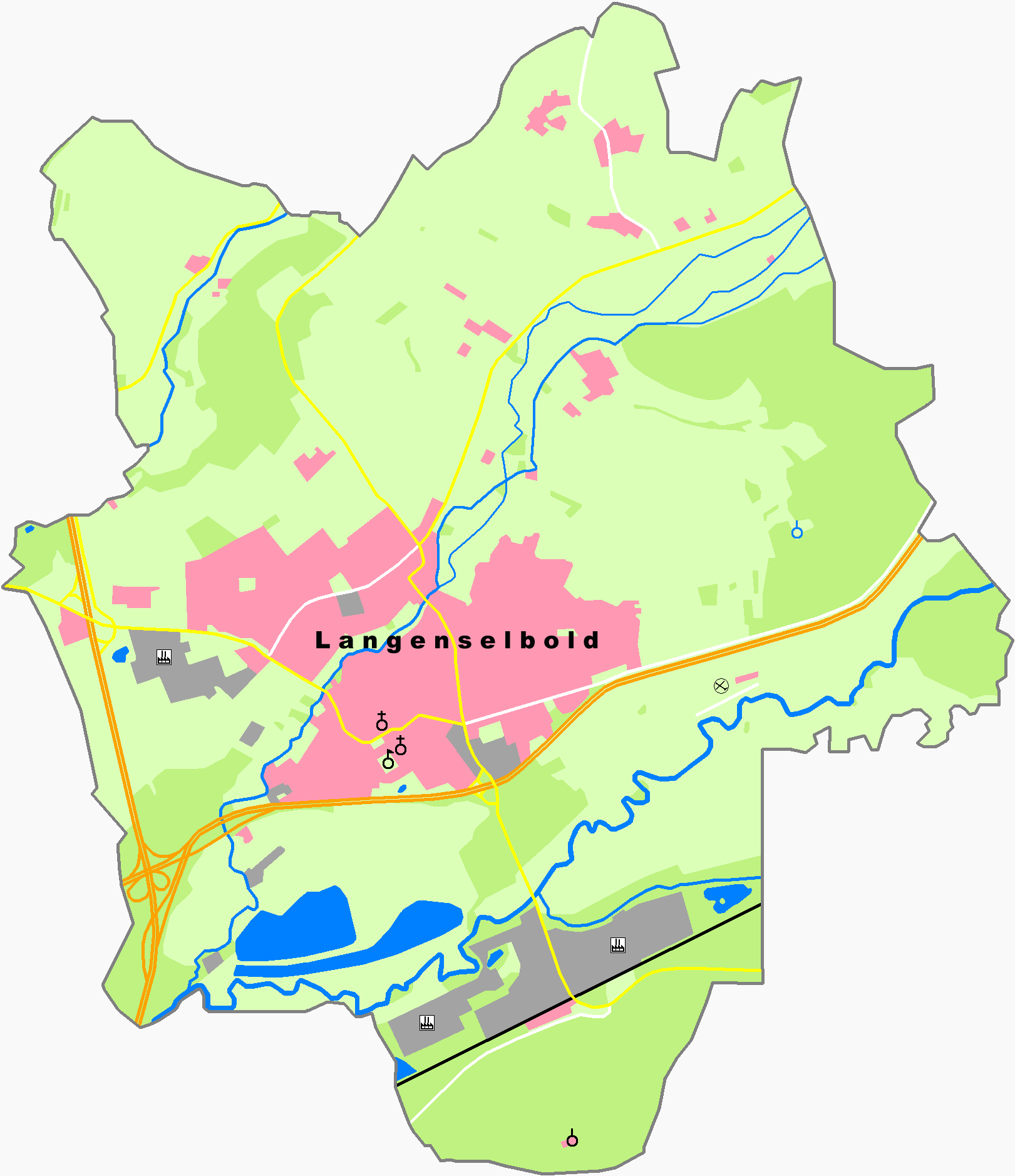
Constituent communities
