= Linsengericht =

- Municipality
- Coat of arms

- Location of Linsengericht within Main-Kinzig-Kreis district
- Interactive map of Linsengericht
- Location within Germany Location within Hesse
- Coordinates: 50°10′N 09°13′E
- Country: Germany
- State: Hesse
- Admin. region: Darmstadt
- District: Main-Kinzig-Kreis

Government
  - Mayor (2020–26): Albert Ungermann (SPD)

Area
  - Total: 29.8 km^{2} (11.5 sq mi)
- Elevation: 166 m (545 ft)

Population (2025-12-31)
  - Total: 9,548
  - Density: 320/km^{2} (830/sq mi)
- Time zone: UTC+01:00 (CET)
  - Summer (DST): UTC+02:00 (CEST)
- Postal codes: 63589
- Dialling codes: 06051
- Vehicle registration: MKK
- Website: www.linsengericht.de

Linsengericht (German pronunciation: [ˈlɪnzn̩ɡəˌʁɪçt]) is a municipality in the Main-Kinzig district, in Hesse, Germany.

== Geography ==
=== Location ===
The municipality lies in the Main-Kinzig district of Hesse. It is located in the valley of the Kinzig, south and southeast of the town of Gelnhausen. Its territory also extends into the wooded hills of the Spessart.

=== Subdivision ===
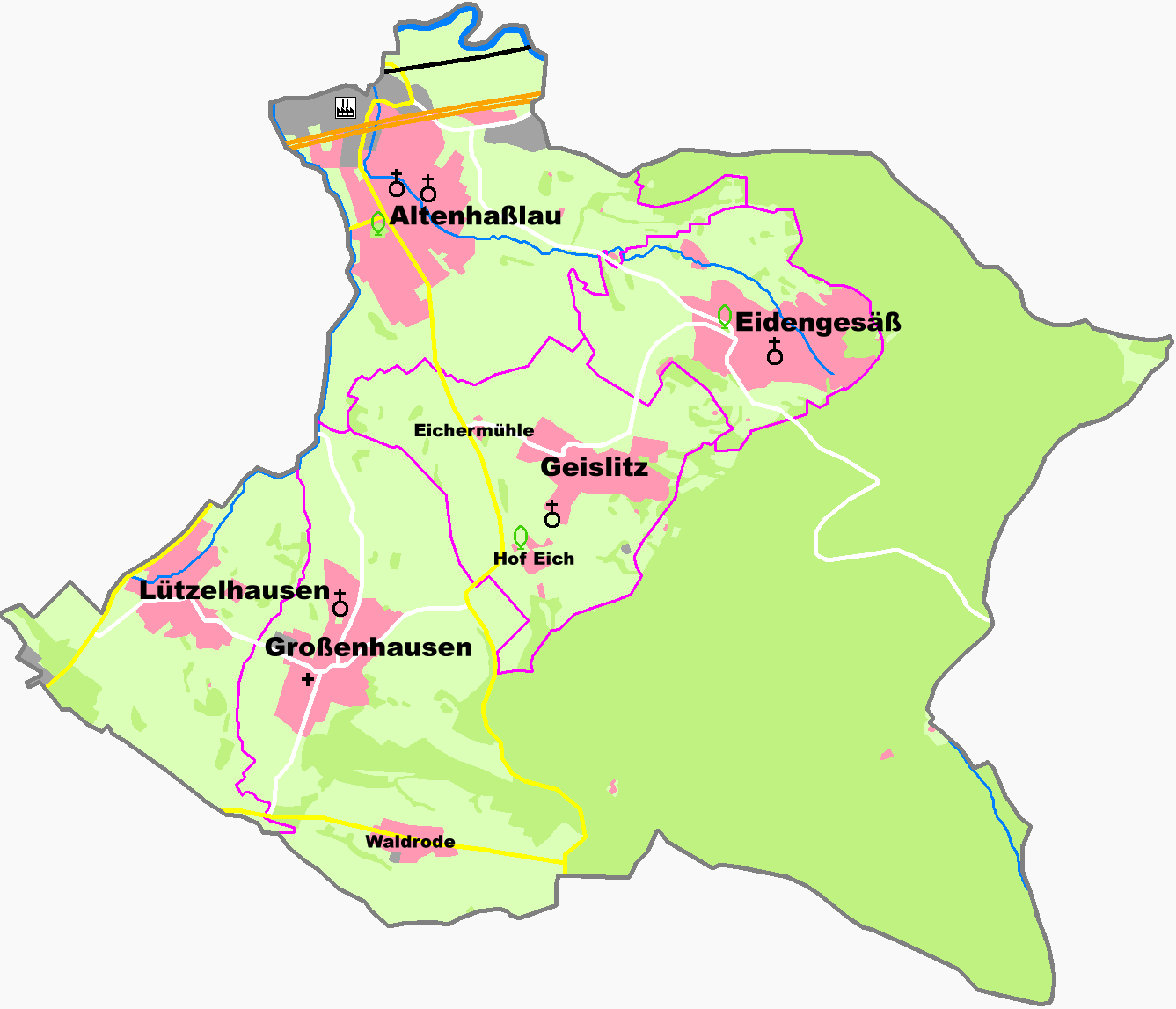
Constituent communities

Linsengericht consists of the Ortsteile Altenhaßlau, Eidengesäß, Geislitz (with Hof Eich and Eichermühle), Großenhausen (with Waldrode) and Lützelhausen.

== Name ==
Linsengericht is derived from "court under the linden" from "Linde" (German for "linden" - another term for the lime tree) and "Gericht" (German for "court").
