= Rodenbach, Hesse =

Rodenbach
- Municipality
- Coat of arms

- Location of Rodenbach within Main-Kinzig-Kreis district
- Interactive map of Rodenbach
- Location within Germany Location within Hesse
- Coordinates: 50°08′20″N 09°02′30″E
- Country: Germany
- State: Hesse
- Admin. region: Darmstadt
- District: Main-Kinzig-Kreis
- Subdivisions: 2 districts

Government
  - Mayor (2020–26): Klaus Schejna (SPD)

Area
  - Total: 16.74 km^{2} (6.46 sq mi)
- Elevation: 147 m (482 ft)

Population (2025-12-31)
  - Total: 11,211
  - Density: 669.7/km^{2} (1,735/sq mi)
- Time zone: UTC+01:00 (CET)
  - Summer (DST): UTC+02:00 (CEST)
- Postal codes: 63517
- Dialling codes: 06184
- Vehicle registration: MKK
- Website: www.rodenbach.de

Rodenbach (German pronunciation: [ˈʁoːdn̩bax]) is a municipality in the Main-Kinzig district, in Hesse, Germany. It is situated on the river Kinzig, 8 km east of Hanau.

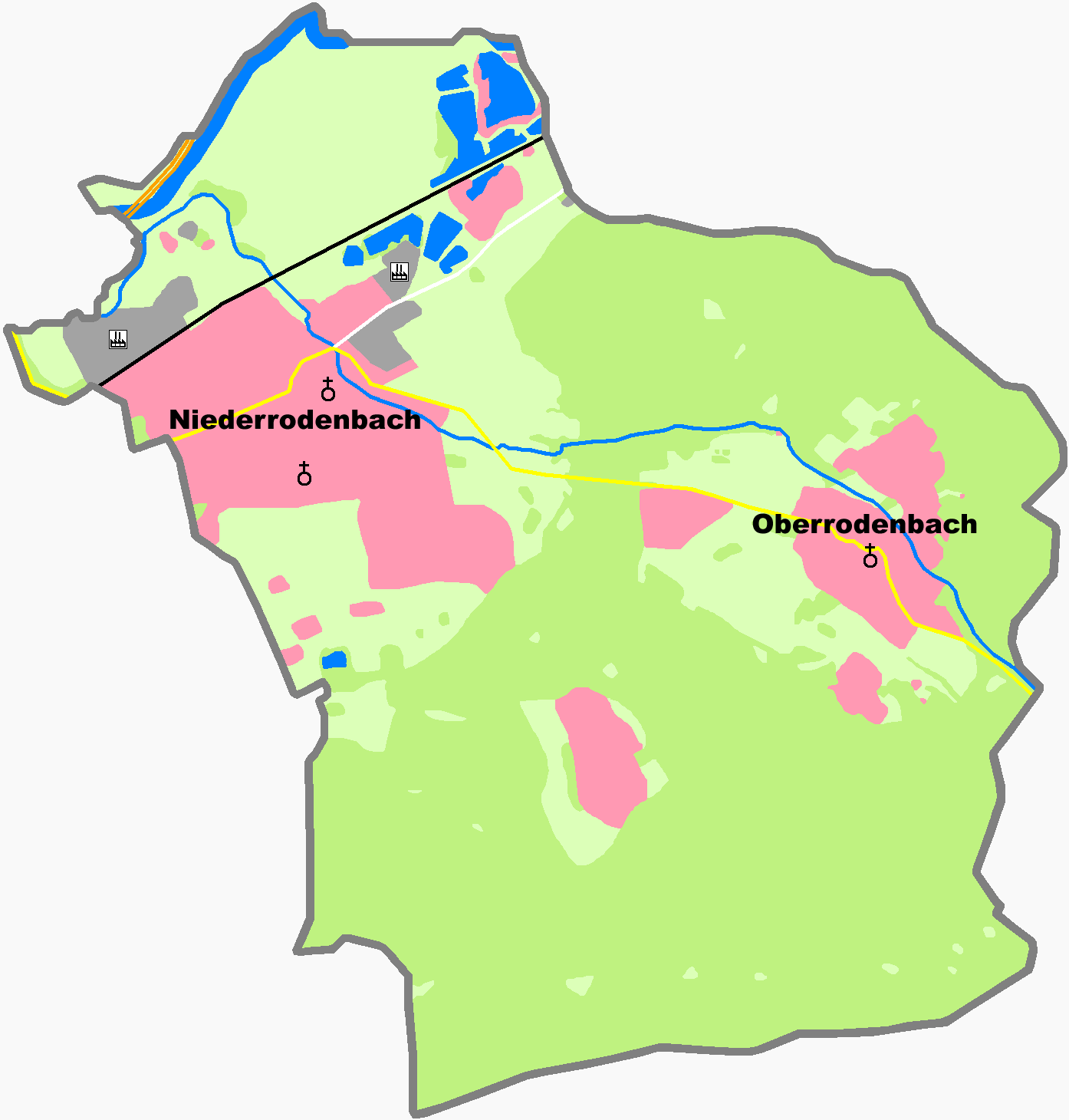
Gemeindeteile

== Wildlife ==
The Niederrodenbacher Steinbrüche is a 37 hectares nature reserve, just south of Niederrodenbach. It gained protected status in 1979, when it was reclaimed from the quarry.

== Sport ==
Adjacent to the nature reserve is the site of former motorcycle stadium, called the Rodenbach Motodrom. The motorcycle club MSC Rodenbach was founded on 17 January 1952 and still exists today despite the fact that the stadium is long gone. Initially a Moto Cross track in 1959, followed by a grass track and then a 600 metres long track before a 400 metres track opened on 31 March 1968. The stadium hosted significant motorcycle speedway events including qualifying rounds of the Speedway World Team Cup in 1971, 1972 and 1980, the Speedway World Pairs Championship in 1974 and qualifying rounds of the Speedway World Championship. The stadium featured terracing and attracted good attendances before being demolished in 1986 and eventually reclaimed by nature.

- The FC Germania 09 e.V. Niederrodenbach association football team play at the Waldstadion.
- The Tennis-Club Rodenbach e.V. is located on Landwehrstraße.
- The Turnverein Oberrodenbach 1887 e.V. and the SV Falke Oberrodenbach is a tennis club and archery club respectively on Wiesenstraße.
