= Main-Kinzig-Kreis =

Coordinates: 50°15′N 9°18′E

- District
- Flag Coat of arms
- Country: Germany
- State: Hesse
- Adm. region: Darmstadt
- Capital: Gelnhausen

Government
  - District admin.: Thorsten Stolz (SPD)

Area
  - Total: 1,320.86 km^{2} (509.99 sq mi)

Population (31 December 2025)
  - Total: 322,593
  - Density: 244.230/km^{2} (632.552/sq mi)
- Time zone: UTC+01:00 (CET)
  - Summer (DST): UTC+02:00 (CEST)
- Vehicle registration: MKK, GN, SLÜ, HU
- Website: www.mkk.de

Main-Kinzig-Kreis is a district in Hesse, Germany. Neighboring districts are Wetteraukreis, Vogelsbergkreis, Fulda in Hesse and Bad Kissingen, Main-Spessart and Aschaffenburg in Bavaria. The district-free cities of Offenbach, Frankfurt, and Hanau (since 2026) also border the district.

== History ==
The district was created in 1974 by merging the former districts of Hanau, Schlüchtern, Gelnhausen and the former urban district of Hanau. It is basically the former territory of the county of Hesse-Hanau.

In 2005, the capital of the district was moved from Hanau, its most populous city, to Gelnhausen. On 1 January 2026, Hanau left the Main-Kinzig-Kreis and became a district-free city again after reaching 100,000 inhabitants in 2021.

== Geography ==
The district is named after the two primary rivers: the Main flows along the south-west corner of the district. The Kinzig, a tributary of the Main, flows through the district.

According to the Institut Géographique National from 1 January 2007 until July 2013 the geographic centre of the European Union was located on a wheat field outside of Gelnhausen.

== Economy ==
In 2017 (latest data available) the GDP per inhabitant was €34,185. This places the district 15th out of 26 districts (rural and urban) in Hesse (overall average: €45,107).

=== Transport ===
Rhein-Main-Verkehrsverbund (RMV)

The district is in the area of thr transport association Rhein-Main-Verkehrsverbund (RMV).

== Towns and municipalities ==
Clickable map of towns and municipalities in the district

Towns
1. Bad Orb
2. Bad Soden-Salmünster
3. Bruchköbel
4. Erlensee
5. Gelnhausen
6. Langenselbold
7. Maintal
8. Nidderau
9. Schlüchtern
10. Steinau an der Straße
11. Wächtersbach
Municipalities
1. Biebergemünd
2. Birstein
3. Brachttal
4. Flörsbachtal
5. Freigericht
6. Großkrotzenburg
7. Gründau
8. Hammersbach
9. Hasselroth

10. Jossgrund
11. Linsengericht
12. Neuberg
13. Niederdorfelden
14. Rodenbach
15. Ronneburg
16. Schöneck
17. Sinntal

In addition, the district contains an unincorporated area, the Gutsbezirk Spessart.

== Coat of arms ==
The coat of arms is a combination of the coat of arms of the previous districts which were merged in 1974. The swan in top comes from the defunct Hanau district, and is the old crest of the Counts of Hanau. The eagle in the left is taken from the town of Gelnhausen. The bars in the right are taken from the coat of arms of the Lords of Hutten, who owned the area around Bad Soden and Salmünster, formerly part of the defunct Schlüchtern district.

== Partnerships ==
The oldest partnership was inherited from the previous district Hanau, and was formed in 1972 with the Croatian municipality of Kutina – however it took till the 20th anniversary in 1992 that this partnership was officially signed. In 1986 the district parliament decided to start a developing project with the Diriamba region in Nicaragua.

Since 1990 the district has a partnership with the Thuringian district Gotha. Also in 1990 first contacts with the Russian Rayon Istra were started, which resulted in an official partnership in 1992. In 1993 the partnership with the Hungarian Komárom-Esztergom County was signed, with the first contacts also dating back to 1990.

A friendship was signed in 1997 with the Russian city Troitsk, together with the partnership of the city Wächtersbach with Troitsk. In 2000 a treaty of friendship was signed with the Italian province Belluno, as well as a partnership with the Israeli city Ramat Gan.

Main-Kinzig-Kreis is twinned with:

- Ramat Gan, Israel, since 1990
- Kutina, Croatia

== See also ==
- Teufelshöhle (near Steinau)
- Ronneburg Castle
