= Darmstadt (region) =

Coordinates: 50°05′N 8°45′E

- Regierungsbezirk
- Map of Hesse highlighting Darmstadt
- Country: Germany
- State: Hesse
- Region seat: Darmstadt

Government
  - District President: Jan Hilligardt (SPD)

Area
  - Total: 7,444.88 km^{2} (2,874.48 sq mi)

Population (31 December 2025)
  - Total: 4,044,140
  - Density: 543.211/km^{2} (1,406.91/sq mi)

GDP
  - Total: €266.733 billion (2024)
  - Per capita: €66,039 (2024)
- Website: www.rp-darmstadt.hessen.de

Darmstadt is one of the three Regierungsbezirke of Hesse, Germany, located in the south of the state. The other two Regierungsbezirke are Giessen and Kassel.

Kreise
(districts)
1. Bergstraße
2. Darmstadt-Dieburg
3. Groß-Gerau
4. Hochtaunuskreis
5. Main-Kinzig
6. Main-Taunus-Kreis
7. Odenwaldkreis
8. Offenbach
9. Rheingau-Taunus
10. Wetteraukreis
Kreisfreie Städte
(district-free cities)
1. Darmstadt
2. Frankfurt (Main)
3. Hanau
4. Offenbach
5. Wiesbaden

== Economy ==
The Gross domestic product (GDP) of the region was €207.7 billion in 2018, accounting for 6.2% of German economic output. GDP per capita adjusted for purchasing power was €47,800 or 159% of the EU27 average in the same year. The GDP per employee was 127% of the EU average. This makes it one of the wealthiest regions in Germany and Europe.
