= Horst =

Horst may refer to:

== Science ==
- Horst (geology), a raised fault block bounded by normal faults or graben

== People ==
- Horst (given name)
- Horst (surname)
- ter Horst, Dutch surname
- van der Horst, Dutch surname

== Places ==
=== Settlements ===
==== Germany ====
- Horst, Steinburg, a municipality in the district of Steinburg in Schleswig-Holstein
- Horst, Lauenburg, a municipality in the district of Lauenburg in Schleswig-Holstein
- Horst, Mecklenburg-Vorpommern, a village and district in the municipality of Sundhagen, Mecklenburg-Vorpommern
- Horst, Gelsenkirchen, a district in the city of Gelsenkirchen, North Rhine-Westphalia
- Horst, Seevetal, a town in the municipality of Seevetal, Lower Saxony

==== Netherlands ====
- Horst aan de Maas, a municipality in the province of Limburg
  - Horst, Limburg, the municipal seat of Horst aan de Maas
- Horst, Gelderland, a hamlet in the municipality of Ermelo, Gelderland
- Horst, North Brabant, a village in the municipality of Gilze en Rijen, North Brabant

==== Poland ====
- Niechorze, German name for a village in West Pomeranian Voivodeship, north-western Poland

=== Buildings ===
- Castle van Horst, a castle in the Belgian municipality of Holsbeek, Flemish Brabant
- Castle Ter Horst, Achterberg, a former castle in the Dutch municipality of Achterberg, Utrecht
- Huys ter Horst, a partially rebuild castle ruin in the Dutch municipality of Horst aan de Maas

=== Geographic features ===
- Horst (Spessart), a hill in Hesse, Germany
- Horst (Vogelsberg), a hill in Hesse, Germany

== Sport ==
- STV Horst-Emscher, a defunct German association football club

== Fictional characters ==
- Horst (Inheritance), a character in the novel Eragon
- Horst Staley, a MacArthur midshipman in the Larry Niven and Jerry Pournelle science fiction novel The Mote in God's Eye
- Dr. Horst, a character in the 2002 film Wilbur Wants to Kill Himself played by Mads Mikkelsen
- Horst, a character in the 2007 film Ratatouille played by Will Arnett
- Horst Cabal, the main character's elder brother from Jonathan L. Howard's Johannes Cabal series
- Horst Loeffler, the main character's almost ex-husband from the 2013 postmodern detective novel Bleeding Edge by Thomas Pynchon
