= Horst (surname) =

Horst is a surname, and notable people with the surname include:

- Alexander Horst (born 1982), Austrian beach volleyball player
- César Horst (born 1989), Argentine football player
- David Horst (born 1985), American soccer player
- Deena Horst (born 1944), American politician
- Egon Horst (1938–2015), German football player
- Elizabeth K. Horst, American diplomat
- Emil Clemens Horst (1867–1940), German-American hop farmer and inventor
- Gregor Horst (1578–1636), German anatomist
- Hans Jacob Horst (1848–1931), Norwegian politician
- Heather Horst, American anthropologist
- Henry Horst (1836–1905), American politician
- Horst P. Horst (1906–1999), German-American fashion photographer
- Jacob Horst (born 1997), American weightlifter
- Jeremy Horst (born 1985), American baseball pitcher
- Jochen Horst (born 1961), Sri Lankan-born German actor
- Jon Horst (born 1983), American basketball manager
- Jørn Lier Horst (born 1970), Norwegian author
- Louis Horst (1884–1964), American choreographer, composer, and pianist
- Marloes Horst (born 1989), Dutch fashion model
- Sandra Horst, Canadian pianist, vocal coach, and choral conductor
- Sarah Hörst (born 1982), American planetary scientist

== See also ==
- Horst
- Horst (given name)
