= Wintersberg (Spessart) =

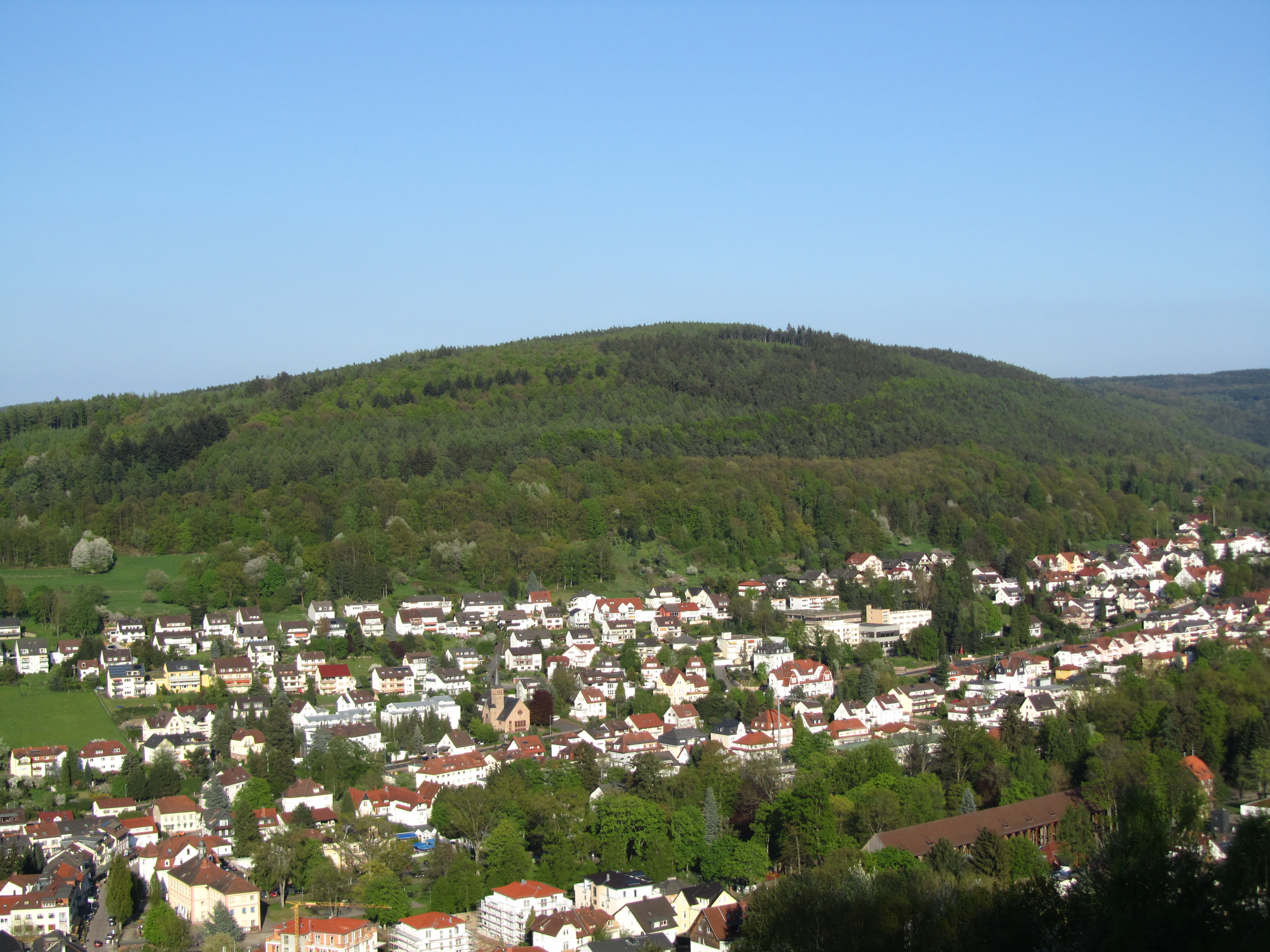
- View from the northwest across Bad Orb

Highest point
- Elevation: 434 m (1,424 ft)
- Coordinates: 50°13′15″N 9°22′22″E

Geography
- Location within Hesse
- Location: Hesse, Germany
- Parent range: Spessart

Wintersberg is a wooded hill of Hesse, Germany. It lies in the Mittelgebirge Spessart, in the district of Main-Kinzig near the town of Bad Orb. The highest elevation is 434 meters above NHN.

Wintersberg divides the valley of the Hasel from that of the Orb. To the east it connects to neighbouring Wegscheide hill, where the prisoner-of-war camp Stalag IX-B was located (it serves as a summer camp for children today).
