= Beilstein (Spessart) =

Mountain in Germany

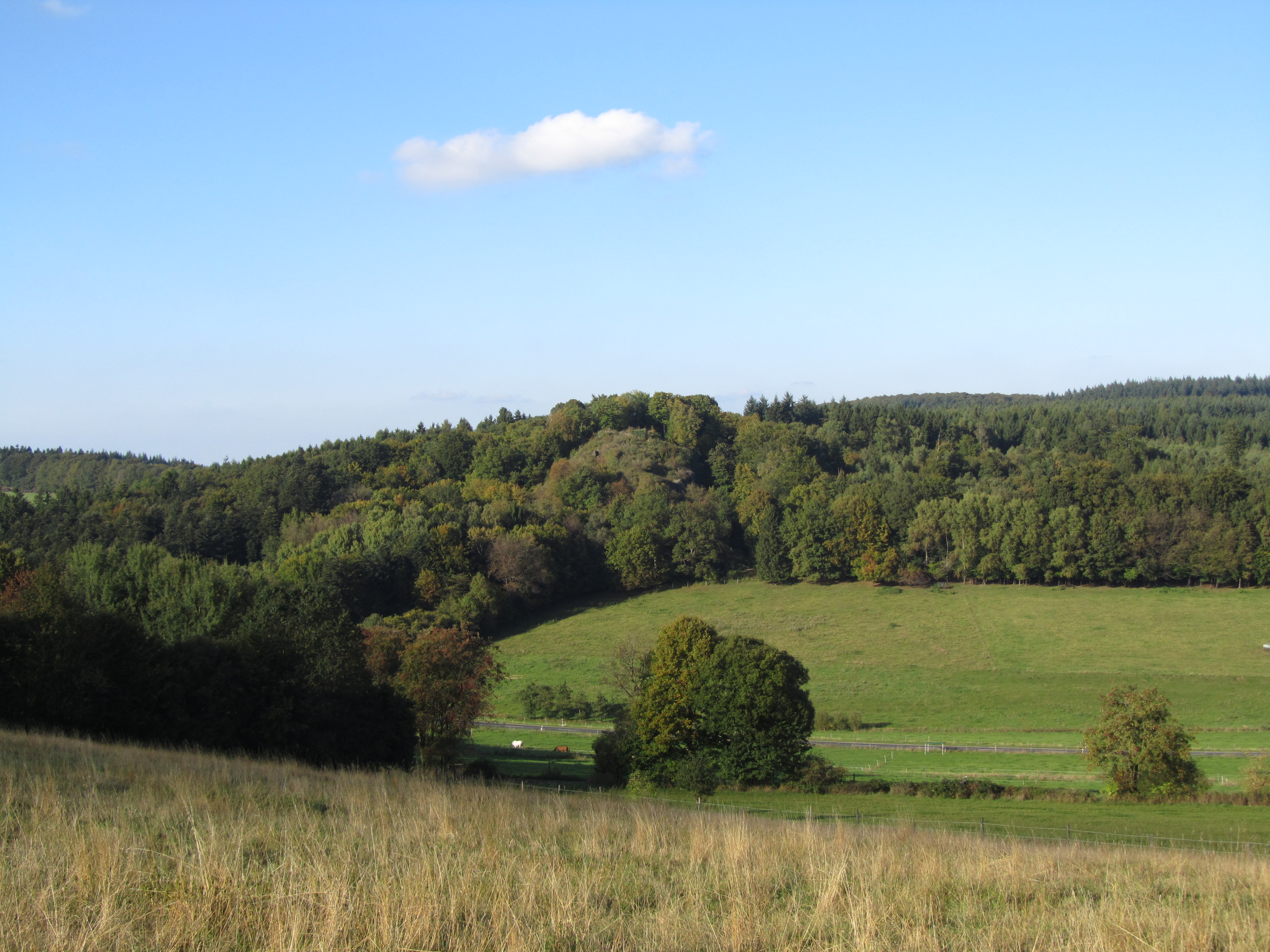
- Beilstein seen from the southwest

Highest point
- Elevation: 499 m (1,637 ft)
- Coordinates: 50°10′13″N 9°24′10″E

Geography
- Location within Hesse
- Location: Hesse, Germany
- Parent range: Spessart

Geology
- Mountain type: Basalt

The Beilstein (German pronunciation: [ˈbaɪlʃtaɪn]) is a hill in the Main-Kinzig district of Hesse, Germany. It is part of the Spessart range and lies in the municipality of Jossgrund close to the Ortsteil of Lettgenbrunn. Its elevation is 499 metres above sea level.

== Geography ==
=== Location ===
The Beilstein is located at the end of the valley of the Jossa. It is part of the Mittelgebirge Spessart and lies in the Hessian part of the range, close to the border to Bavaria. The Beilstein lies between Lettgenbrunn and Bad Orb, just south of the 521 m high Hoher Berg.

The Beilstein is part of the municipal territory of Jossgrund.

=== Geology ===
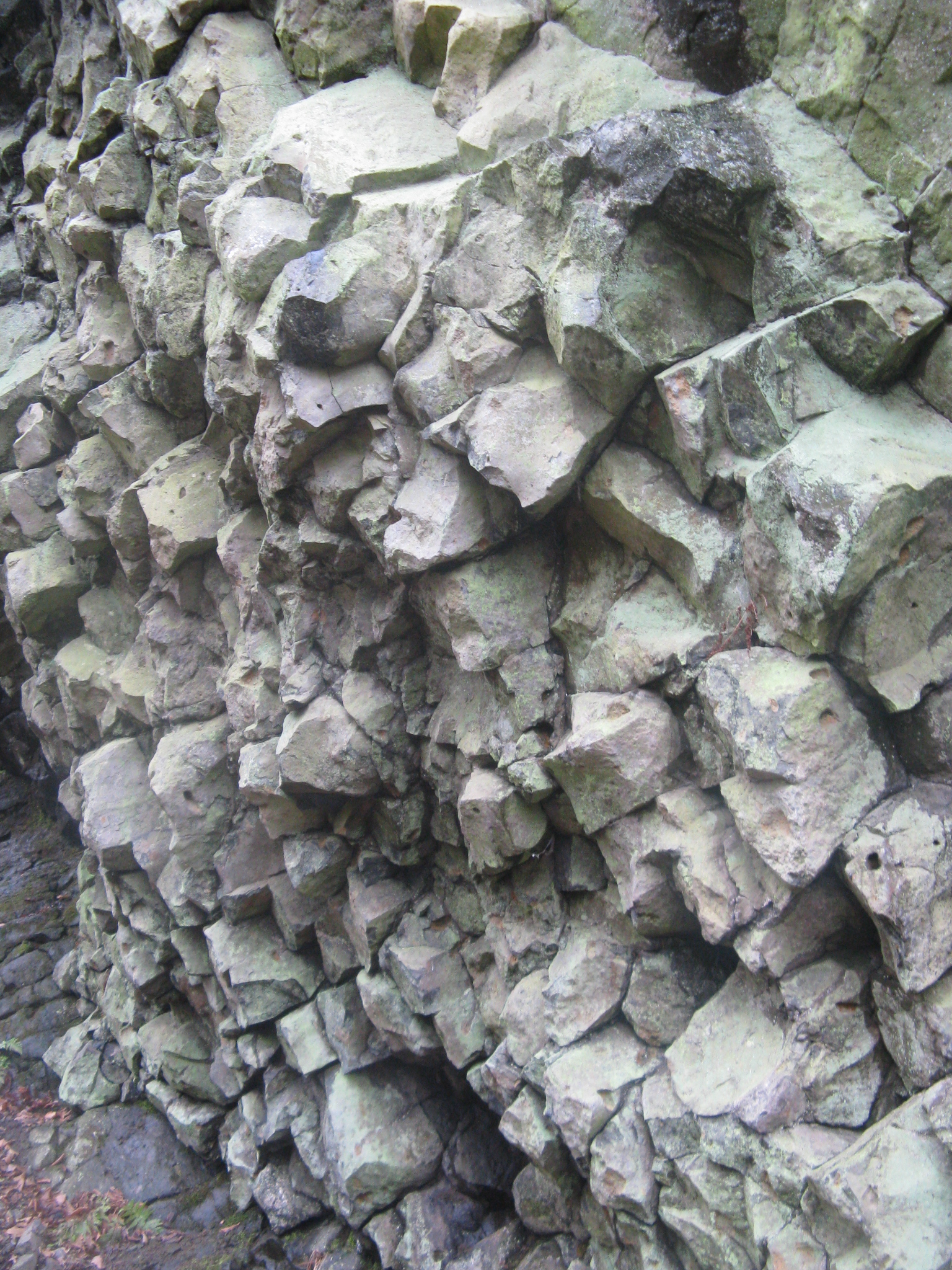
Detail of the basalt formations

Unlike most of the Spessart, which consists mainly of Buntsandstein, the Beilstein is an outcropping of basalt. The upper slopes of the hill are wooded, but at the top basalt rocks are exposed. Around 10-20 million years ago, volcanic activity caused this to break through the local Buntsandstein, which is roughly 200 million years older. The Beilstein features characteristic basalt columns and the largest basalt cave in the Main-Kinzig district.

== History ==
On the peak are the remains of a medieval hill castle known as Burg Beilstein. The place is first mentioned in 1059 as Bilstein as part of the border of the territory of Fulda monastery, but at that point it was likely not a castle but just a landmark. In 1313, the castle was bought by the Electorate of Mainz from the lords of Hohenlohe-Brauneck along with the area around Lettgenbrunn. The castle is last mentioned in 1427. Two important ancient trade routes, the Eselsweg and the Birkenhainer Strasse pass through the area. The former is overlooked by the Beilstein and was the likely reason for the castle's construction. Today, only the foundation of a wall remains of the castle.

In the 1930s, an observation bunker for bomber training at Lettgenbrunn and Villbach (both today part of Jossgrund) was constructed on the peak. After the war it was blown up and only the foundations remain.

== Nature preserve ==
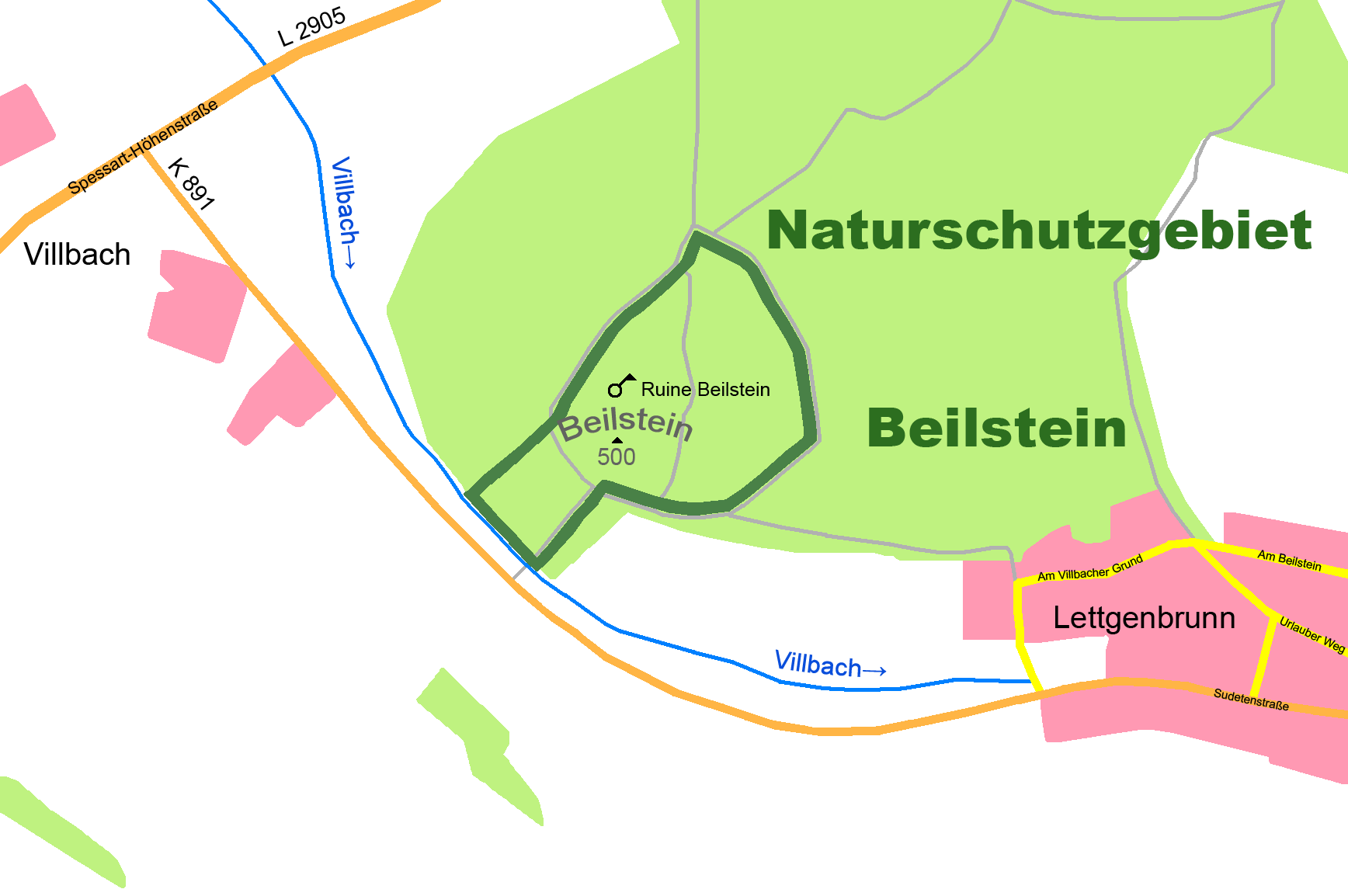
Map of the nature reserve (in dark green)

In 1905, the Beilstein was included on a list of German natural landmarks. In 1930, parts of the hill were declared a nature reserve, one of the first in Hesse. The preserve today measures 5.75 hectares and hosts a large number of plant species such as Lilium martagon or Deutscher Streifenfarn.
