= Walter Fetterly =

- Walter Fetterly as a young cadet
- Born: 1907; Chicago, Illinois, U.S.
- Died: January 1987 (aged 79–80); Dunedin, Florida, U.S.
- Burial place: Elmwood Cemetery (North Brunswick)
- Military career
- Allegiance: United States
- Branch: Army
- Rank: Colonel
- Units: 2nd Battalion, 114th Infantry Regiment, 44th Infantry Division
- Awards: Bronze Star Medal

Walter D. Fetterly (1907–1987) was an American colonel and Bronze Star Medal recipient who served during World War II.

== Early life ==
Fetterly was born in Chicago to Mr. and Mrs. Charles L. Fetterly. He later moved to New Brunswick, New Jersey, and married Clara Louise Kenyon, with whom he had three sons – Charles, Walter and James.

== Military career ==
Fetterly graduated from the Pennsylvania Military College in 1929, and was assigned to the 114th Infantry Regiment.

On February 15, 1945, Fetterly was awarded the Bronze Star Medal for "meritorious action in eastern France." His regiment, which had sustained heavy casualties, including one company losing all of its officers, was quickly reorganized by Fetterly and able to secure their objectives, successfully capturing the Bellevue and Brandelfingerhoff farms.

In April 1945, Fetterly was in charge of a task force consisting of the 2nd Battalion, 114th Regiment, 44th Infantry Division, that had been reinforced with armored cars and light tanks, whose objective was to liberate a POW camp in Stalag IX-B, Bad Orb, 60 kilometers (37 miles) behind enemy lines. The attack was a success, and the camp, which numbered 6,000 prisoners, of which 3,364 were American, was secured on April 4.

On May 19, 1950, 25-30 tons of TNT from an ammunition depot in South Amboy, New Jersey detonated. The governor declared the situation a state of emergency, and Fetterly, in command of the 114th Infantry Regiment of the United States National Guard, maintained order in the area by regulating traffic and defending post offices, banks, and other federal property. The National Guard was demobilized on May 22.

== Retirement and death ==
After the war, Fetterly returned home, and was a member of the Retired Officers Association, American Red Cross, and the New Brunswick Christ Episcopal Church, among others. Fetterly died in January 1987, in his winter home in Dunedin, Florida.
