= Villbach =

Villbach may refer to:

- Villbach (river), of Hesse, Germany
- Villbach (Jossgrund), a hamlet of the municipality Jossgrund, Hesse, Germany
