= Horst (Spessart) =

Wooded hill in Hesse, Germany

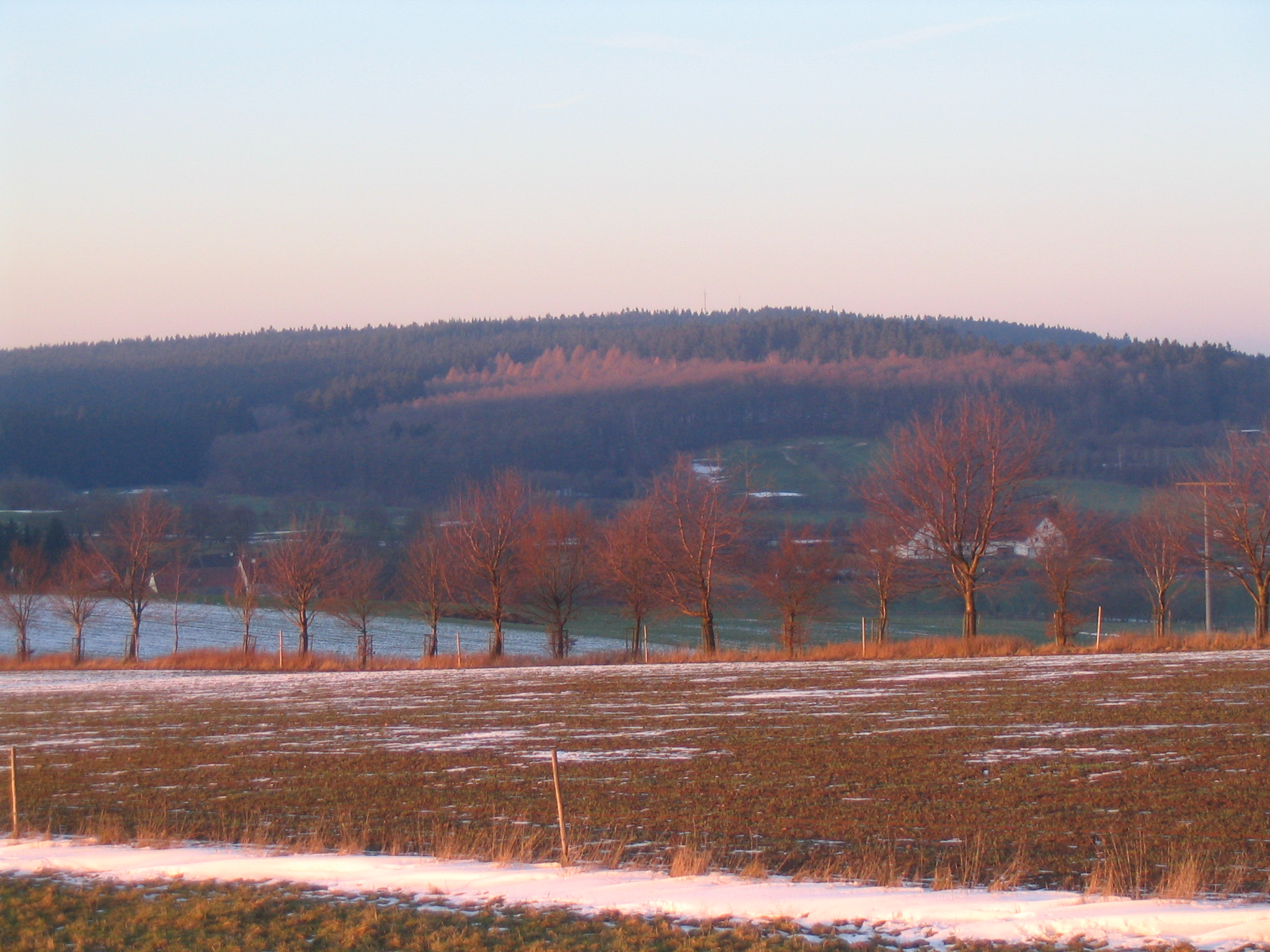
- View from the south

Highest point
- Elevation: 540 m (1,770 ft)
- Coordinates: 50°11′21″N 9°23′03″E

Geography
- Location within Hesse
- Location: Hesse, Germany
- Parent range: Spessart

Horst is a wooded hill of Hesse, Germany. It lies in the Mittelgebirge Spessart not far from the border to Bavaria.

It is located between Bad Orb and Jossgrund in the Main-Kinzig-Kreis.
