= Gregor Kraus =

Gregor Konrad Michael Kraus (9 May 1841 in Bad Orb in Hesse-Nassau – 14 November 1915 in Würzburg) was a 19th-century German botanist and plant ecologist.

Kraus studied medicine and natural history at the University of Würzburg. He became inspired by the professor of botany Julius von Sachs. Thus, he specialized in that discipline and obtained a doctorate degree in 1866. He first became professor and director of the botanic garden at the University of Erlangen, where he stayed until 1872. In 1872, he succeeded Anton de Bary as professor and director of the botanic garden at the University of Halle. He remained in that position until 1898, when he succeeded his former mentor Sachs at the University of Würzburg. There he stayed for the remainder of his professional life.

Kraus studied numerous aspects of the discipline of botany, e.g. fossil trees, driftwood from Siberia collected on the northeastern coast of Greenland by the Second German North Polar Expedition, chlorophyll, photosynthesis in Crassulaceae to the history of botanic gardens in general and the Botanic Garden of Halle University in particular. His name, however, became particularly associated with the relationships between plants and microclimate. He published detailed accounts of the distribution of water in plant bodies and micrometeorology.
