= Hasel (Orb) =

River in Germany

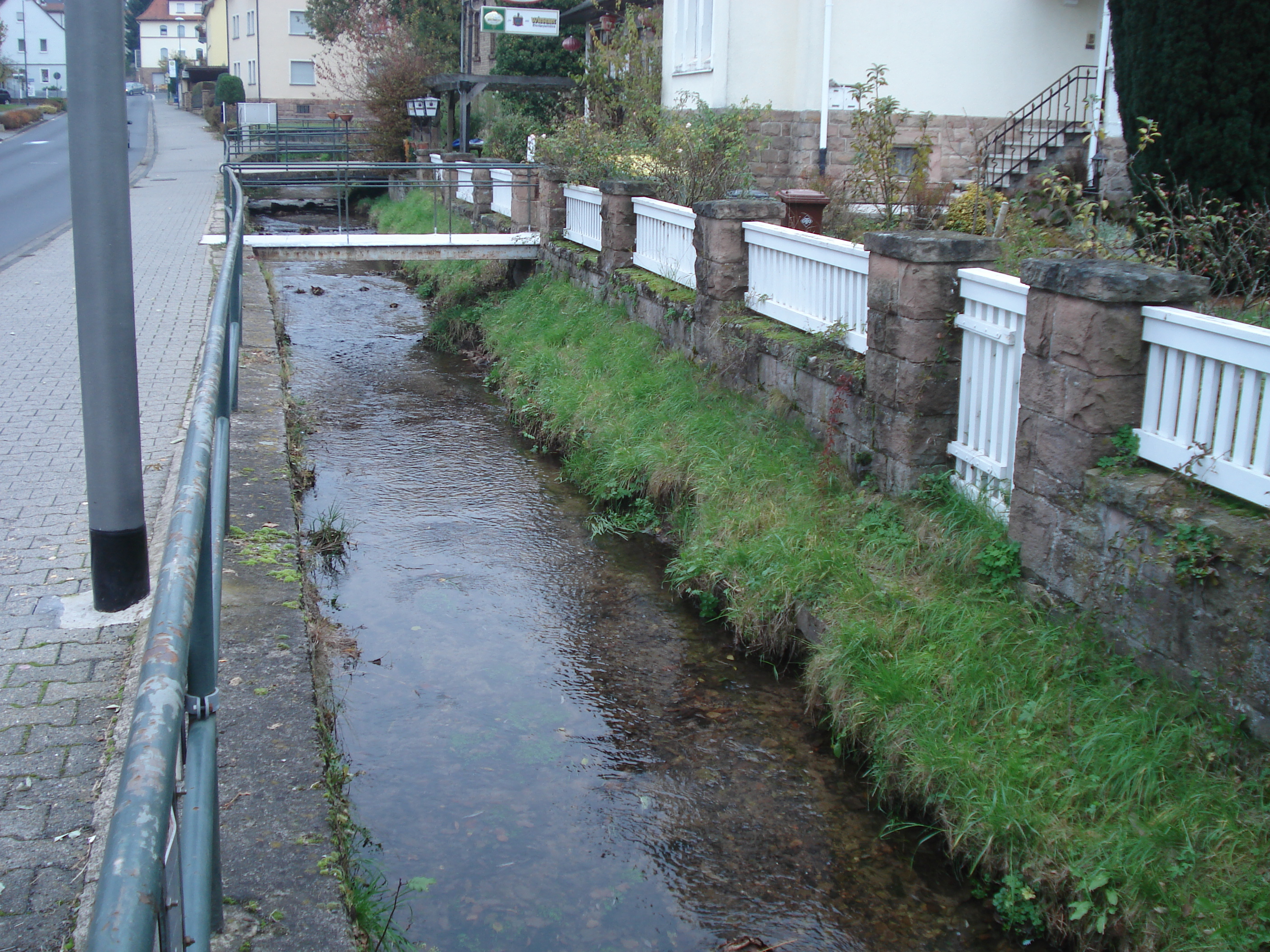

Location
- Country: Germany
- States: Hesse

Physical characteristics
- Mouth
  - location: Orb
  - coordinates: 50.2278°N 9.3486°E

Basin features
- Progression: Orb→ Kinzig→ Main→ Rhine→ North Sea

Hasel (German pronunciation: [ˈhaːzl̩]; also called Haselbach) is a river of Hesse, Germany. It is a right tributary of the Orb in Bad Orb.

== See also ==
- List of rivers of Hesse
