= Gregor Horst =

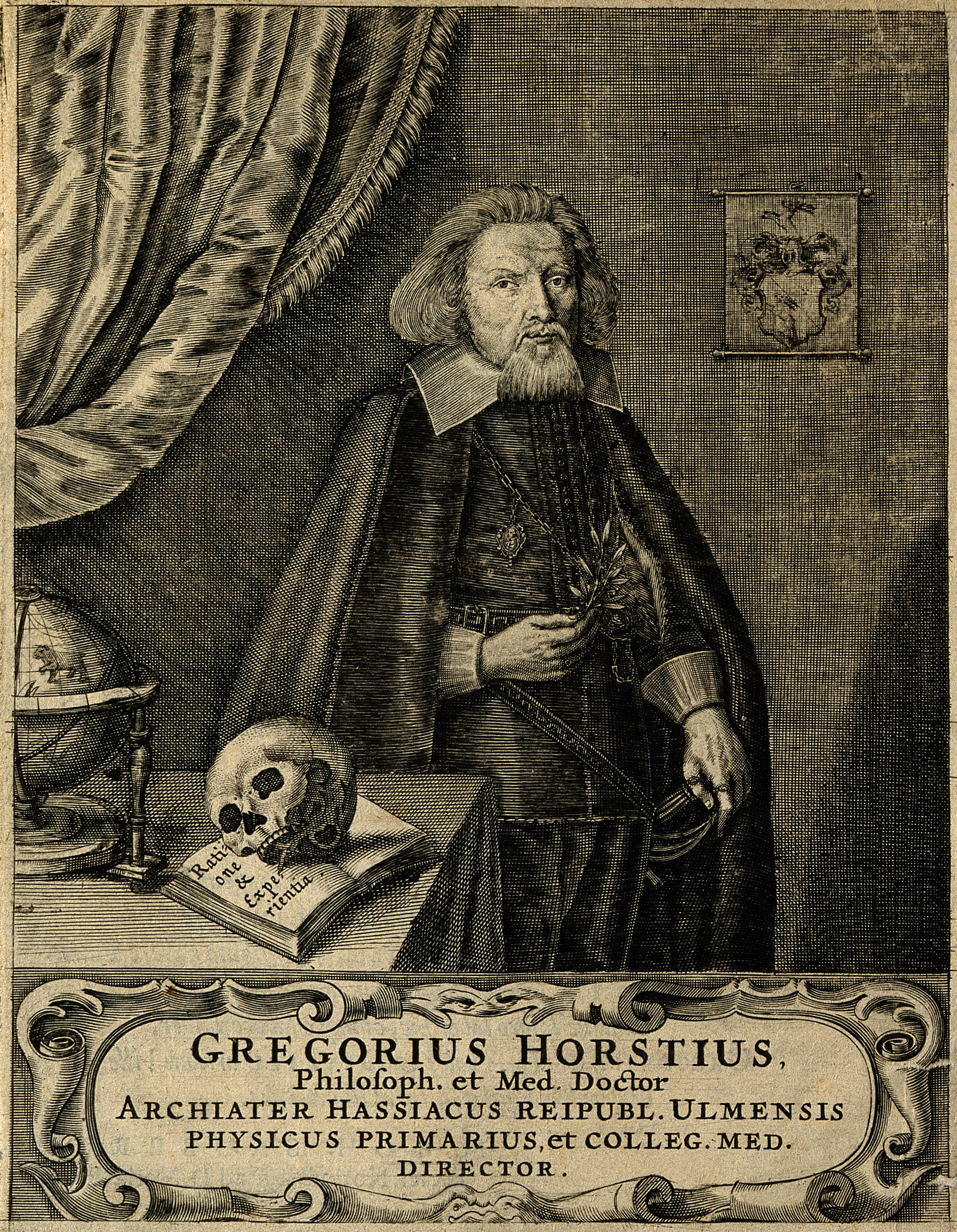

Gregor Horst Latinized as Gregorius Horstius (5 November 1578 – 9 August 1636) was a German physician, anatomist and professor of medicine at the University of Giessen. He promoted a shift from regurgitation of old medical ideas and was called Practicus prudens (experienced practitioner) and "the Aesculapius of the Germans". He tried to establish a rational approach to medicine and his motto ratione et experientia (reason and experience) was included in his portraits.

== Life and work ==
Horst was born in Torgau to architect Georg Horst (1534–1584) and Anna née Bornitius. A half-brother was Jakob Müller (1594–1637) who also became a professor of medicine at Giessen. Horst studied at the University of Helmstedt (1597) and Wittenberg (1600). He travelled in Switzerland and Austria and received his medical degree in 1606 at Basel. He taught medicine at the University of Wittenberg and then to Giessen in 1608. In 1609 he was appointed personal physician to Landgrave Ludwig V of Hesse-Darmstadt. He was involved in the drafting of the “Leges et Statuta Collegii Medici” (1609) of Giessen. He married Hedwig Stamm, daughter of a fellow-professor, in 1615. They had six children including a namesake Gregor Horst (1626–1661) who became an anatomist and collaborated with Conrad Gesner. Another son, Johann Daniel Horst (1616–1685), became a professor of medicine in Marburg. He served as Rector of the university of Giessen in 1612 and 1616 but left in 1622 due to troubles from the Thirty Years' War. He became a city physician at Ulm where he died in 1636 from gout.

Horst conducted public dissections from 1615. First of an executed woman and then in 1616 of a male. The public were invited to these dissections and it resulted in the publication of Anatomia publica. His De Natura Humana (1612) plagiarized illustrations from Vesalius' Humani corporis fabrica (1543). Horst also perpetuated the Galenic mythology of the rete mirabile in humans. Galen had dissected an ox and claimed that the fine network at the base of the brain was associated with the humors. It was assumed to also exist in humans. In 1608 he established a botanical garden Hortus medicus. In 1612 he published a textbook of anatomy De Natura Humana which was derived from the work of Vesalius. He also tried to explain the action of drugs. Several of his works were published posthumously.
