= Horst Peissker =

German biochemist, inventor and business executive

Horst Peissker or Horst Peißker (born 18 October 1927) was a German biochemist, inventor and business executive in the pharmaceutical and chemical industry. He was a researcher at Schering AG, and was a member of the company's senior management as head of its research and production facility in Wolfenbüttel (now Bayer CropScience).

He was a co-inventor of several patents in crop protection, notably on the use of phosphoric acid esters as a pest control agent, miticides, use of phenyl-carbamate derivatives in combating insects and acarids, and synergistic pesticidal compositions containing carbamates and phosphates.

He obtained a doctorate (Doktoringenieur) at Technische Universität Berlin in 1957, with the dissertation Darstellung und Reaktionen N-substituierter Aminosäuren.
