= Ter Horst =

Ter Horst is a Dutch toponymic surname. The original bearer of the name was from the horst, which is a historical indication of raised terrain covered with shrubs. People with the name include:

- Guusje ter Horst (b. 1952), Dutch politician and government minister
- Kate ter Horst (1906–1992), a.k.a. Angel of Arnhem, Dutch woman who tended wounded soldiers during the Battle of Arnhem
- Olivier ter Horst (b. 1989), Dutch professional football player
- Rachel Ter Horst (b. 1973), Dutch model
- Enrique ter Horst (b. 1952), Venezuelan diplomat
- Jano ter Horst (born 2002), German footballer
- Jerald terHorst (1922–2010), press secretary to President Gerald Ford

== See also ==
- Van der Horst, Dutch surname
