= Horst (given name) =

Horst is a male given name used mostly in German-speaking countries.

== Etymology/meaning ==
The name is of Old High German origin, meaning "man from the forest", "bosk" or "brushwood". In modern German, "Horst" is also a translation of English aerie, the nest of an eagle or other bird.

== Notable people named Horst ==
- Horst Ademeit (1912–1944), German Luftwaffe fighter ace
- Horst Antes (born 1936), German artist and sculptor
- Horst Arndt (1934–2014), West German rower
- Horst Assmy (1933–1972), German footballer
- Horst Astroth (1923–2017), German track and field athlete
- Horst Bellingrodt (born 1958), Colombian Olympic sports shooter
- Horst Bienek (1930–1990), German writer and poet
- Horst Bischof (born 1967), Austrian computer scientist
- Horst Buchholz (1933–2003), German actor
- Horst Bulau (born 1962), Canadian ski jumper
- Horst Dassler (1936–1987), German businessman
- Horst Eckel (1932–2021), German footballer
- Horst Faas (1933–2012), German photojournalist
- Horst Feistel (1915–1990), German cryptographer
- Horst Fischer (1912–1966), German SS concentration camp doctor executed for war crimes
- Horst Frank (1929–1999), German actor
- Horst P. Horst (1906–1999), German photographer
- Horst Hrubesch (born 1951), German footballer
- Horst Jankowski (1936–1998), German pianist
- Horst Janson (actor) (1935–2025), German actor
- Horst Janssen (1929–1995), German draftsman
- Horst Kasner (1926–2011), German Protestant theologian
- Horst Köhler (1943–2025), Federal President of Germany
- Horst Krause (1941–2025), German actor
- Horst Krüger (1919–1999), German writer
- Horst Lademacher (born 1931), German historian
- Horst Lichter (born 1962), German cook and television presenter
- Horst Mahler (1936–2025), German rightist, previously lawyer and Rote Armee Fraktion member
- Horst Mahseli (1934–1999), Polish footballer
- Horst von Möllendorff (1906–1992), German cartoonist
- Horst Muhlmann (1940–1991), German-born American football player
- Horst Peissker (born 1927), German biochemist
- Horst Queck (1943–2025), East German ski jumper
- Horst Rechelbacher (1941–2014), Austrian-American businessman
- Horst Rosenthal (1915–1942), German-born French cartoonist of Jewish descent
- Horst Salomon (1929–1972), German novelist and screenwriter
- Horst Schnoor (1934–2026), German footballer
- Horst Seehofer (born 1949), minister-president of Bavaria
- Horst Simco (born 1982), American rapper also known as Riff Raff (rapper)
- Horst Sindermann (1915–1990), German politician
- Horst Ludwig Störmer (born 1949), German physicist and Nobel laureate
- Horst Tappert (1923–2008), German actor
- Horst Tüller (1931–2001), German road and track cyclist
- Horst Wessel (1907–1930), German National Socialist political activist, assassinated in Weimar Germany
- Horst Zuse (born 1945), German computer scientist
