= César Horst =

Argentine footballer

Personal information
- Full name: César Ezequiel Horst
- Date of birth: 4 May 1989 (age 37)
- Place of birth: Gualeguaychú, Argentina
- Position: Goalkeeper

Team information
- Current team: Juventud Unida

Youth career
- Central Entrerriano
- 2007–2008: Boca Juniors

Senior career*
| Years | Team | Apps | (Gls) |
| 2008–2011 | Boca Juniors | 0 | (0) |
| 2011–2014 | Rangers | 0 | (0) |
| 2011 | → Platense (loan) | | |
| 2012–2013 | → Deportes Copiapó (loan) | 13 | (0) |
| 2013–2014 | → Real Destroyer (loan) | 18 | (1) |
| 2015–2016 | Atlético Uruguay | 42 | (0) |
| 2017 | Achirense | 21 | (1) |
| 2018 | Deportivo Urdinarrain | | |
| 2018 | San Martín Mendoza | | |
| 2019–2020 | Juventud Unida | 16 | (0) |
| 2021 | Independiente Chivilcoy | 7 | (0) |
| 2021 | Juventud Unida | 6 | (0) |
| 2022 | DEPRO | 13 | (0) |
| 2023–2024 | Independiente Chivilcoy | 3 | (0) |
| 2024 | Salto | 10 | (0) |
| 2025– | Juventud Unida | 5 | (0) |
- * Club domestic league appearances and goals as of 25 December 2025

César Ezequiel Horst (born 4 May 1989) is an Argentine footballer who plays as a goalkeeper for Juventud Unida de Gualeguaychú.

== Teams ==
- (Argentina) Central Entrerriano (youth)
- (Argentina) Boca Juniors 2008–2011
- (Chile) Rangers de Talca 2011–2014
- (Argentina) Platense 2011
- (Chile) Deportes Copiapó 2012–2013
- (El Salvador) Real Destroyer 2013–2014
- (Argentina) Atlético Uruguay 2015–2016
- (Argentina) Achirense 2017
- (Argentina) Deportivo Urdinarrain 2018
- (Argentina) San Martín de Mendoza 2018
- (Argentina) Juventud Unida de Gualeguaychú 2019–2020
- (Argentina) Independiente Chivilcoy 2021
- (Argentina) Juventud Unida de Gualeguaychú 2021
- (Argentina) Defensores de Pronunciamiento 2022
- (Argentina) Independiente Chivilcoy 2023–2024
- (Uruguay) Salto 2024
- (Argentina) Juventud Unida de Gualeguaychú 2025
