= Van der Horst =

Van der Horst is a Dutch toponymic surname. The original bearer of the name was from the horst, which is a historical indication of raised terrain covered with shrubs. People with the name include:

- Anthon van der Horst (1899–1965), Dutch organist and composer
- Arnoldus Vanderhorst (1748–1815), American general and governor
- Cornelius van der Horst (1889–1951) Dutch-South African biologist
- Dimeo van der Horst (born 1991), Dutch basketball player
- Elise van der Horst (born 1982), Dutch singer-songwriter known as EliZe
- Etienne van der Horst (born 1958), Curaçaoan politician
- Fredrik van der Horst (born 1989), Norwegian speed skater
- Klaas van der Horst (1731–1825), Dutch Mennonite teacher and minister
- Jan van der Horst (cyclist) (born 1942), Dutch racing cyclist
- Jan van der Horst (rower) (born 1948), Dutch rower
- Johannes van der Horst (1909–1992), Dutch modern pentathlete
- John Vander Horst (1912–1990), American Episcopal bishop
- Lutz van der Horst (born 1975), German actor and comedian
- Martin van der Horst (born 1965), Dutch volleyball player
- Michel van der Horst (born 1975), Dutch darts player
- Piet van der Horst (1903–1983), Dutch racing cyclist
- Pieter Willem van der Horst (born 1946), Dutch professor and scholar of early Christianity
- Ria van der Horst (born 1932), Dutch swimmer
- Robert van der Horst (born 1984), Dutch hockey player
- Theo van der Horst (1921–2003), Dutch painter, sculptor, graphic artist and glass artist

== See also ==
- Ter Horst, Dutch surname of the same origin
