= Jossgrund =

- Municipality
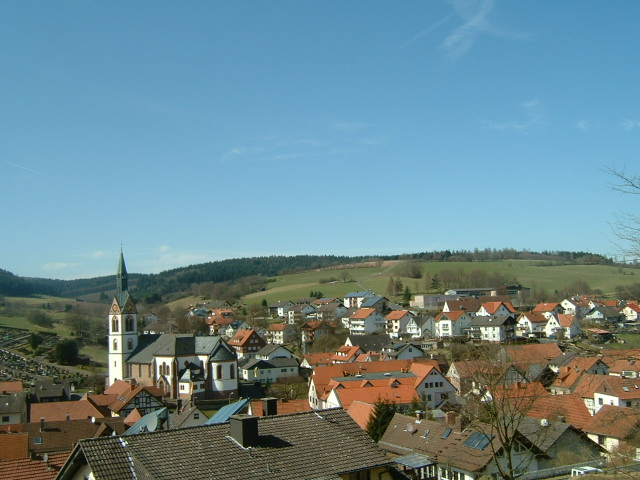
- Oberndorf with St. Martin

- Coat of arms

- Location of Jossgrund within Main-Kinzig-Kreis district
- Interactive map of Jossgrund
- Location within Germany Location within Hesse
- Coordinates: 50°10′45″N 9°27′30″E
- Country: Germany
- State: Hesse
- Admin. region: Darmstadt
- District: Main-Kinzig-Kreis
- Subdivisions: 4 districts

Government
  - Mayor (2023–29): Victor Röder (SPD)

Area
  - Total: 50.61 km^{2} (19.54 sq mi)
- Elevation: 317 m (1,040 ft)

Population (2025-12-31)
  - Total: 3,371
  - Density: 66.61/km^{2} (172.5/sq mi)
- Time zone: UTC+01:00 (CET)
  - Summer (DST): UTC+02:00 (CEST)
- Postal codes: 63637
- Dialling codes: 06059
- Vehicle registration: MKK
- Website: www.jossgrund.de

Jossgrund (German pronunciation: [ˈjɔsˌɡʁʊnt]) is a municipality in the Main-Kinzig district, in Hesse, Germany. It has around 3,500 inhabitants distributed among several formerly independent villages, now Ortsteile. The administration seat is at Oberndorf.

== Geography ==
=== Location ===
The municipality known as "Jossgrund" is located in the valley of the rivulet Jossa, a tributary to the Sinn which in turn discharges into the Franconian Saale shortly before the Saale flows into the river Main at Gemünden am Main. Jossgrund lies among the wooded hills of the Spessart at the border between the German federal states of Hesse and Bavaria (Main-Spessart district).

Jossgrund is made up of several villages and has no real municipal centre.

Although similarly named after the stream, Jossa is an Ortsteil of the municipality of Sinntal. There is also the Naturraum Jossgrund which includes Mernes, Marjoss and Jossa in addition to the municipality Jossgrund.

The municipal territory includes wooded hills like the Beilstein. Northwest of the Beilstein lies the open expanse of a golf course. Except for where the valley of the Jossa connects with the Sinn valley, it is completely surrounded by forests. To the south and southeast the territory of Jossgrund extends through the forest and touches the agricultural areas around Lohrhaupten and Flörsbach (Ortsteile of Flörsbachtal).

=== Subdivisions ===
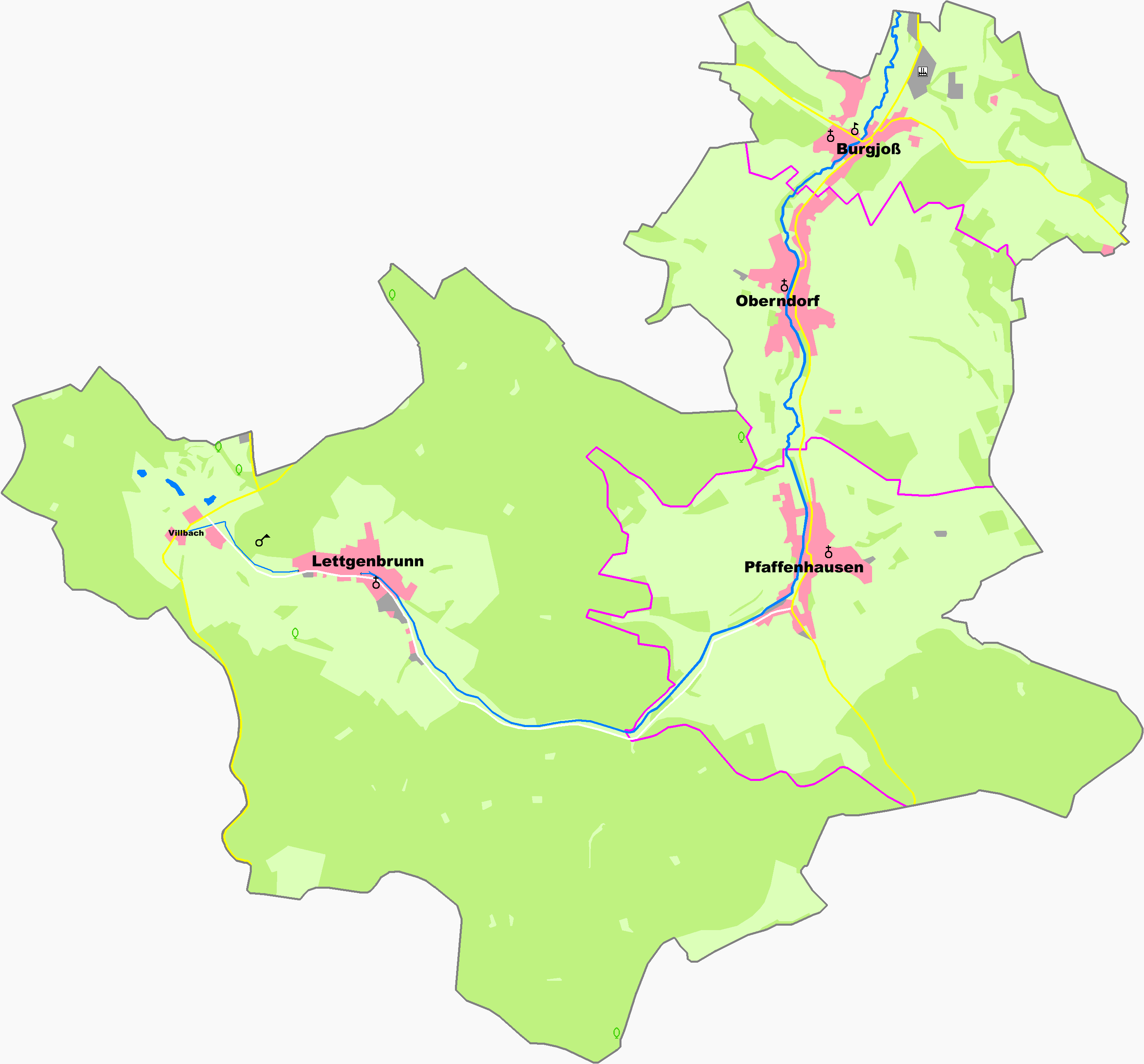
Constituent communities

The community was created only in 1974. It consists of the following Ortsteile: Burgjoss, Oberndorf, Pfaffenhausen and Lettgenbrunn (including the hamlet of Villbach).

=== Neighbouring communities ===
The neighbouring communities are from the north, clockwise: Bad Orb, the unincorporated area Gutsbezirk Spessart, Bad Soden-Salmünster, the unincorporated area Forst Aura (Bavaria), Flörsbachtal and Biebergemünd.

Mernes is a village on the Jossa north of Jossgrund. It is today an Ortsteil of Bad Soden-Salmünster but was historically associated with the other villages of the Jossa valley.

== History ==
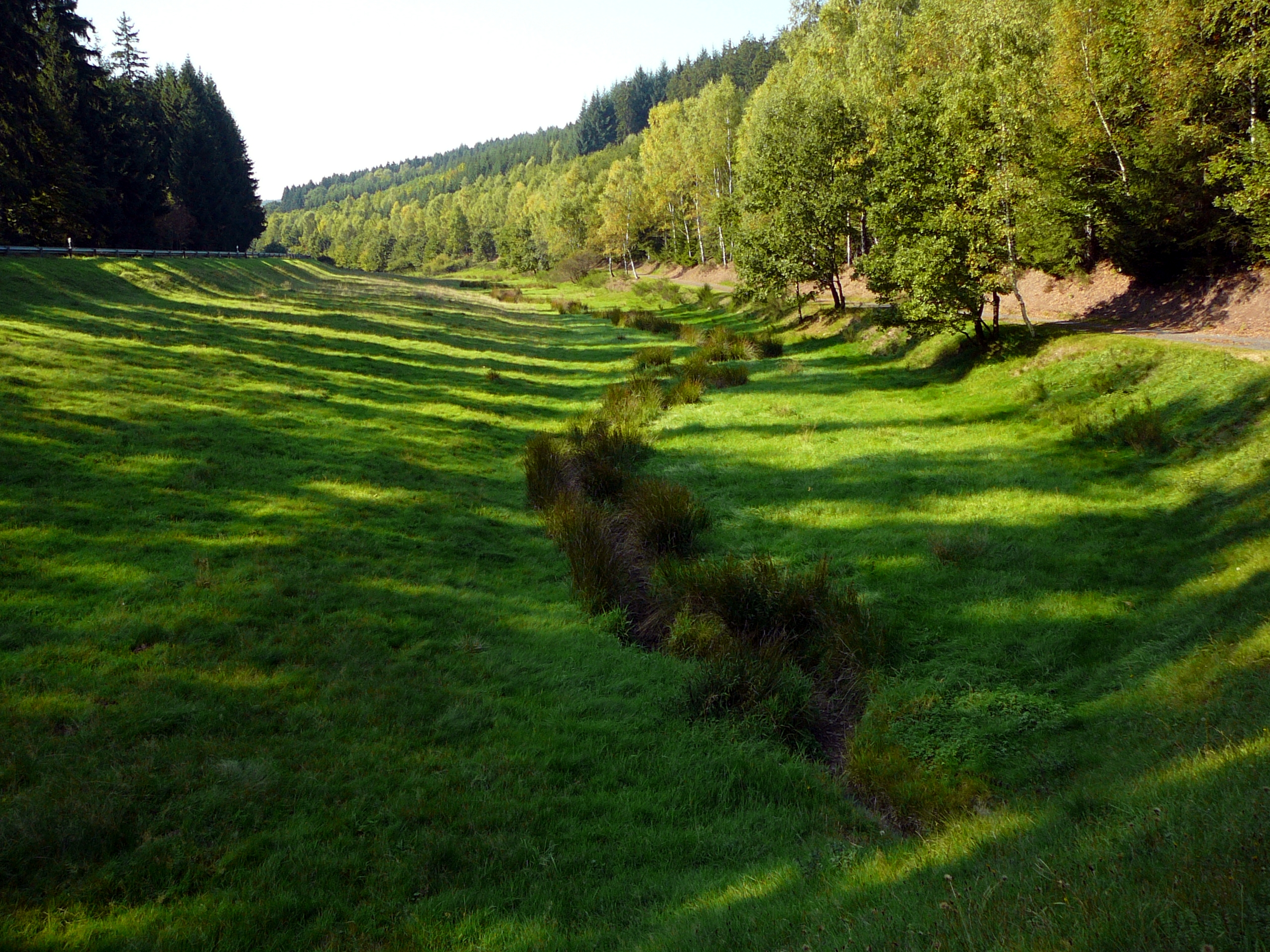
Upper valley of the Jossa between Lettgenbrunn and Pfaffenhausen

The Gericht Burgjoss, the medieval administration area, consisted of Burgjoss, Mernes, Oberndorf and Pfaffenhausen. Its establishment as a possession of Fulda Abbey may date back to Carolingian times.

=== Burgjoss ===
Burgjoss was first mentioned in 850 when a list of properties owned by Fulda Abbey listed a (wooden) castle named Jazaha here. It was replaced in the 12th century by a stone castle.

The monastery granted the Gericht to the Jossa (or Jasza) family, a branch of the Steckelberg family, who likely built the stone castle around 1150. When they moved to the western edge of the Odenwald in the 14th century they started to sell off their possessions here. Ownership and lordship over the area changed several times over the next centuries. In 1326, a quarter of the castle was owned by the house of Isenburg-Büdingen. In 1357, the Counts of Hanau bought the fief from Fulda. In 1451, the Counts of Hanau were named as owning half of the fief, shared with lords of Thüngen and the house of Hutten. Later, the Hutten family seems to have become sole owners and in 1540/1 sold the Gericht to the Electorate of Mainz. The Archbishop later joined it with his possession in the Bezirksamt Hausen.

In the 1570s, Archbishop Daniel Brendel von Homburg had the castle reconstructed and it was turned into a hunting lodge. A lawsuit between Mainz and Hanau over the fief continued for centuries and only ended in 1803 with the disestablishment of the Electorate.

After secularization the Amt eventually became a part of the Kingdom of Bavaria and was merged with the Bezirksamt Orb. After the Austro-Prussian War of 1866, the area passed to Prussia in 1867.

Following World War I, the area became part of the new state of Hesse in 1919.

=== Oberndorf ===
Oberndorf was first mentioned in 1444 as a parish with church (already known as St. Martin). An earlier reference to a church in the valley from 1167 does not mention the location. At the time, Oberndorf was the "upper village" (Oberdorf) of Burgjoss. Oberndorf and its church were heavily damaged in the Thirty Years' War. The church was rebuilt by the lords of Thüngen in 1658/59.

=== Pfaffenhausen ===
Pfaffenhausen was likely founded around 800 by monks or by Saxon prisoners resettled by Charlemagne. It was first mentioned in a document issued by Emperor Henry IV in 1059. The oldest structure is the Aalewirtskreuz, a cross dating to the 15th/16th century. In the 17th century, Pfaffenhausem had three water mills. The final one still in operation was closed in 1972.

Pfaffenhausen

=== Lettgenbrunn ===
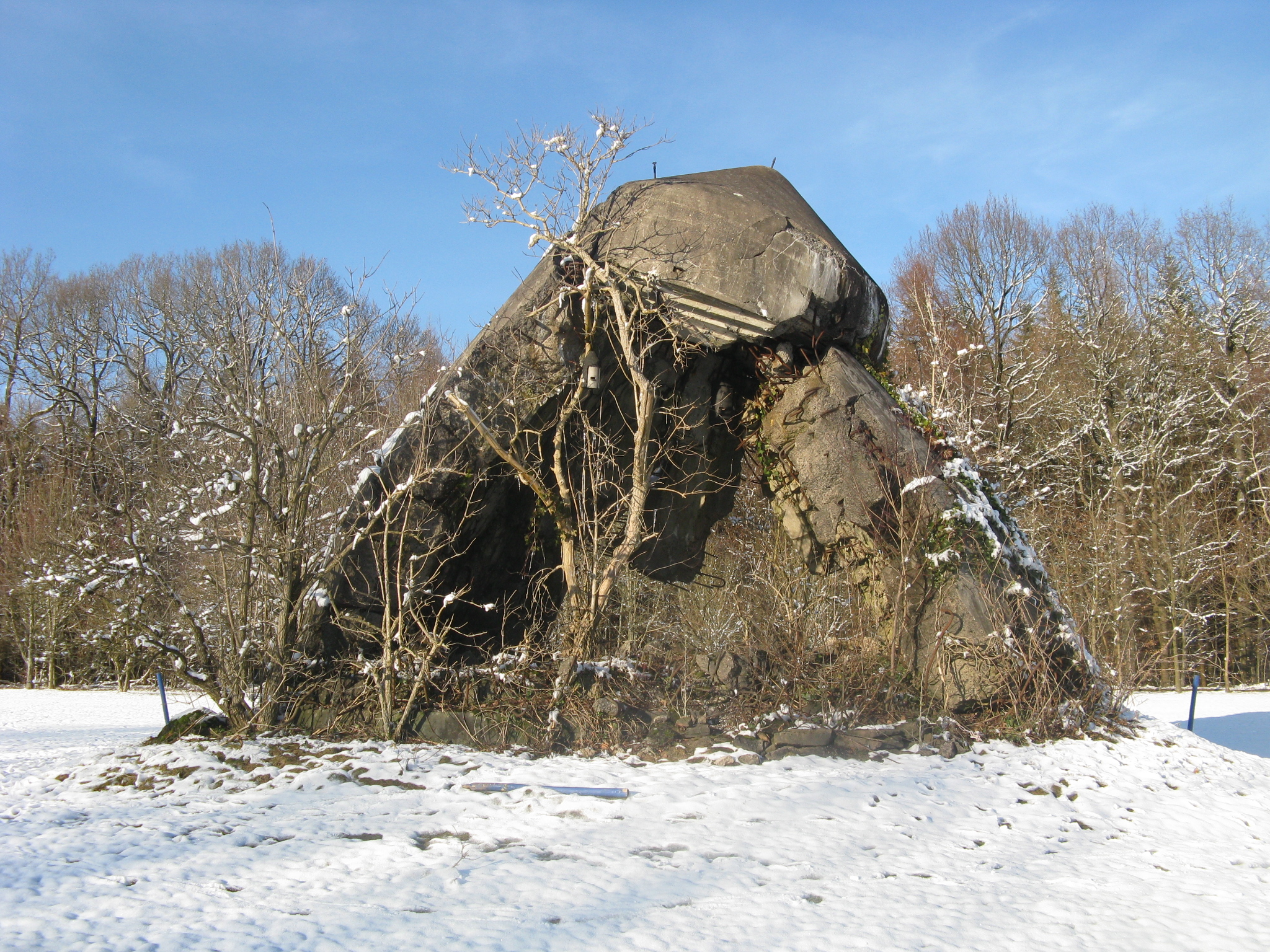
Remains of an observation bunker on the golf course near Lettgenbrunn

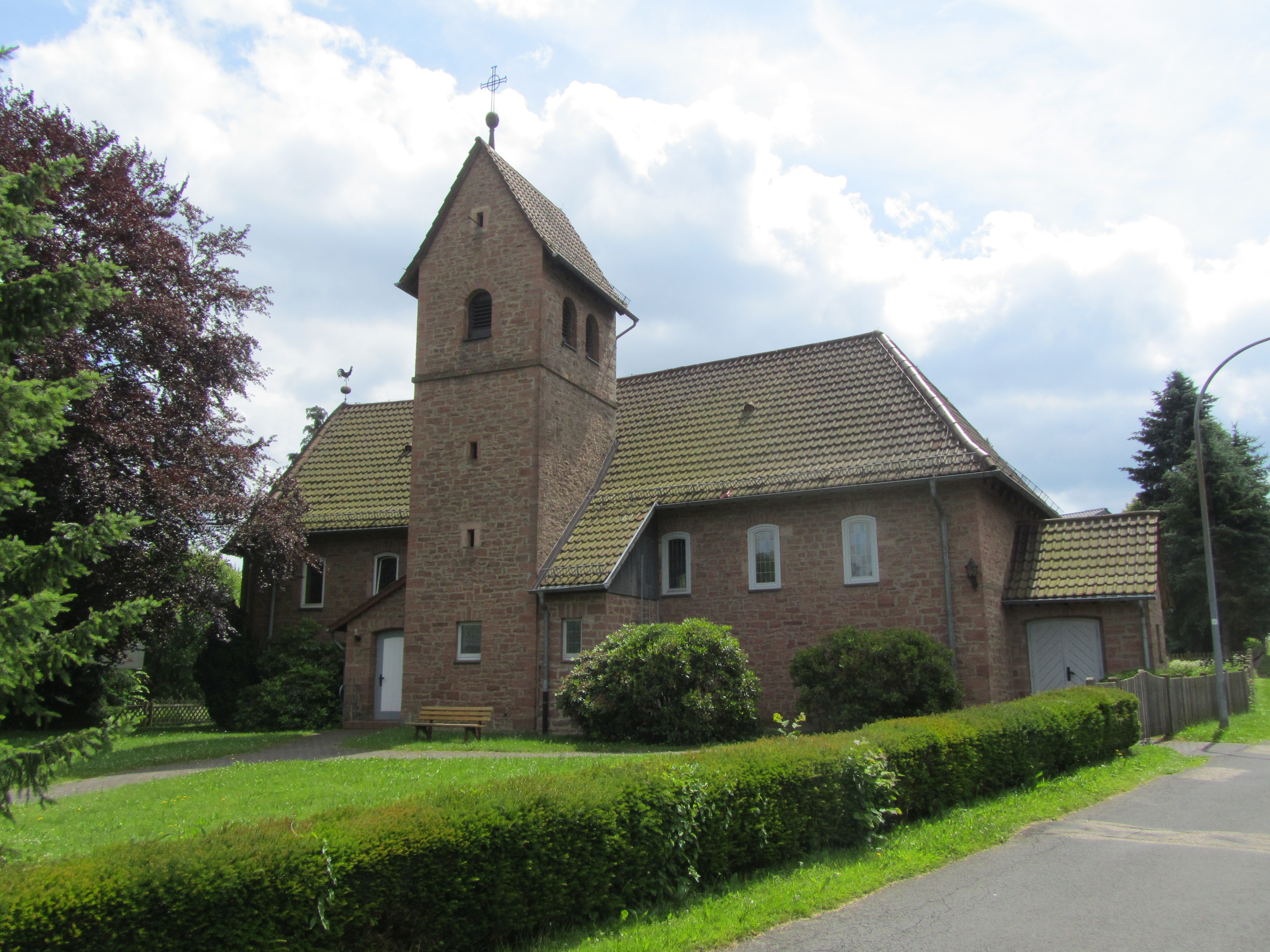
Church of St. Jakobus und Johannes, Lettgenbrunn

Two important ancient trade routes, the Eselsweg and the Birkenhainer Strasse pass through the Lettgenbrunn area.

Lettgenbrunn and the hamlet Villbach were first mentioned in 1313 as Filbuch and Letthechenbrunn. Their creation was likely associated with the Burg Beilstein, a castle on the nearby hill Beilstein, a rare basalt rock in the Spessart hills which are mostly made up of Buntsandstein. Lettgenbrunn was a small Gericht, owned by the family Hohenlohe-Brauneck but sold to the Electorate of Mainz in 1313. Glassblowing was an early industry of importance under the rule of Mainz. Local nobles were granted the Vogtei. In 1343, Fritze Forstmeister became Burgmann of Beilstein castle. In 1435, the post was held by Henne Wymar von Orb, who passed it on to his sons Caspar, Valentin and Henne.

In 1571, the Gericht was moved to Burgjoss and in 1616 to Orb.

In the Thirty Years' War the village was almost completely destroyed and only two dwellings and the chapel St. Jakob (built 1400/50) remained. Afterwards, Lettgenbrunn was rebuilt for the first of three times. The church was reconstructed in 1658 in Baroque style.

In 1905, the Beilstein was declared a Naturdenkmal and since 1930 there has been a protected Naturschutzgebiet Beilstein, one of the oldest nature preserves in Hesse.

In 1911, the Prussian king issued a decree ordering the 327 inhabitants of Lettgenbrunn and Villbach to vacate their homes to make room for a military training area (Truppenübungsplatz Orb) between Lettgenbrunn and the Wegscheide to the northwest (totalling 4,750 hectares). Thus, in 1912/13 the population of Lettgenbrunn and Villbach was relocated. Property was also seized (with compensation) from people at Pfaffenhausen, Oberndorf, Flörsbach, Lohrhaupten, Orb and Burgjoss. In 1919/20, the villages were repopulated with displaced Germans from Alsace-Lorraine and with injured World War I veterans from nearby villages.

In 1935, the villages were once again evacuated as a result of the rearmament efforts of the Nazis. Lettgenbrunn was used as a bombing target for Luftwaffe dive-bomber (Stuka) training. The military area also included what later became Stalag IX-B near Bad Orb.

After the end of World War II, displaced Germans from the eastern territories especially Silesia and the Sudetenland were resettled here in 1947. Today, this is still reflected in local street names like Sudetenstrasse and Ostpreussenstrasse.

In 1952, the old church, heavily damaged by the military, was torn down and replaced by a new building which served both Protestants and Roman Catholics. This was co-financed by donations from American soldiers stationed at Gelnhausen, by the churches and by the Nassauische Siedlungsgesellschaft (today Nassauische Heimstätte) and consecrated in 1954.

=== Creation of the current municipality ===
On 31 December 1971, in the course of Gebietsreform the independent municipalities of Burgjoss, Oberndorf and Pfaffenhausen were merged to "Jossatal". This in turn merged with Lettgenbrunn to form "Jossgrund" on 1 July 1974.

== Attractions ==
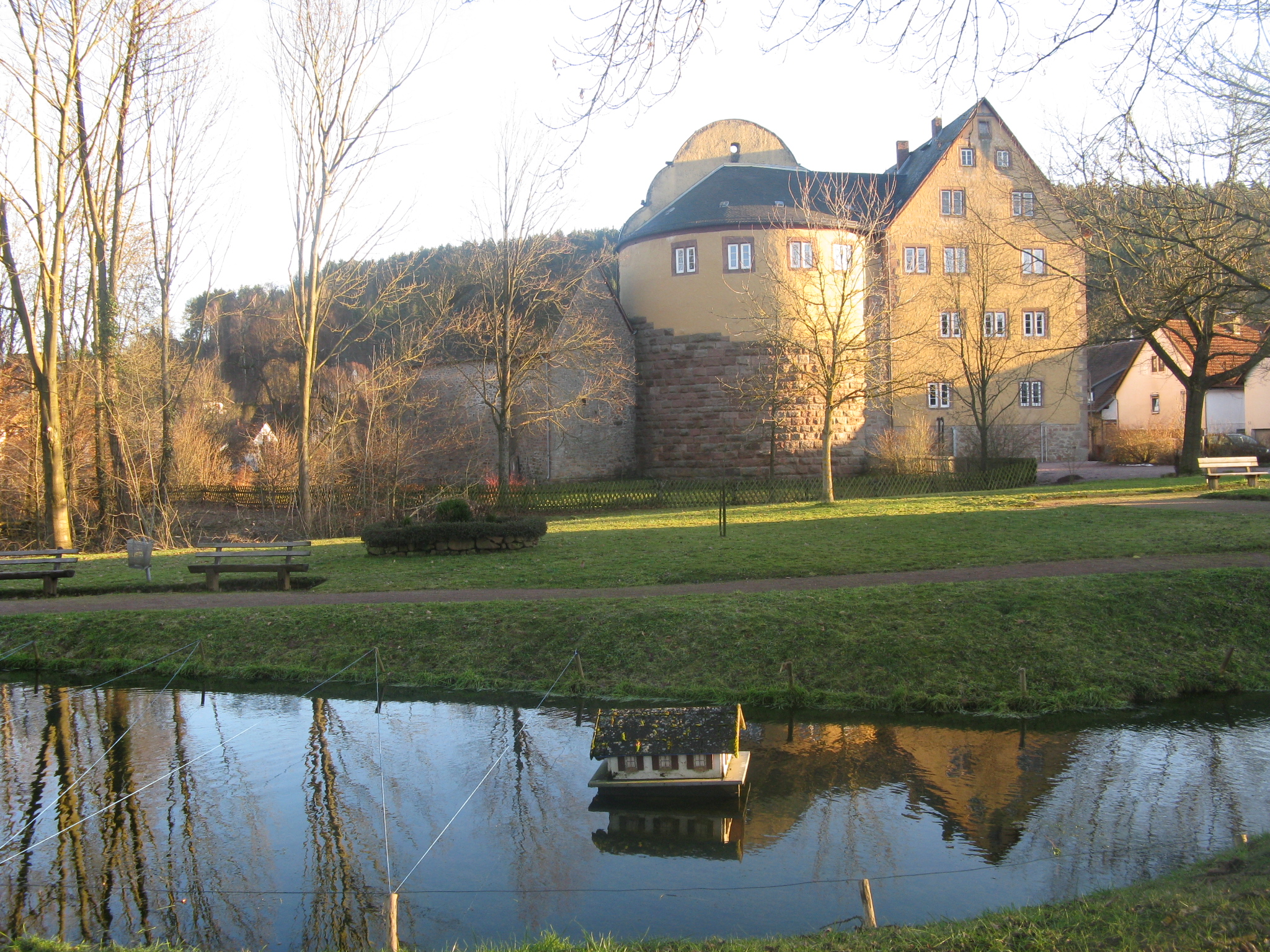
Burg Burgjoß

The most prominent building in Burgjoss is the castle Burg Burgjoß or Burg Jossa, a former 12th-century water castle. The current structure was mostly built under Daniel Brendel von Homburg in the 16th century in Renaissance style but the castle retains Romanesque elements.

The church of St. Martin at Oberndorf as it appears today is mostly a product of an 1891 renovation. Its structures largely date to the mid-17th century, however.
