= Jossa (Sinn) =

River in Hesse, Germany

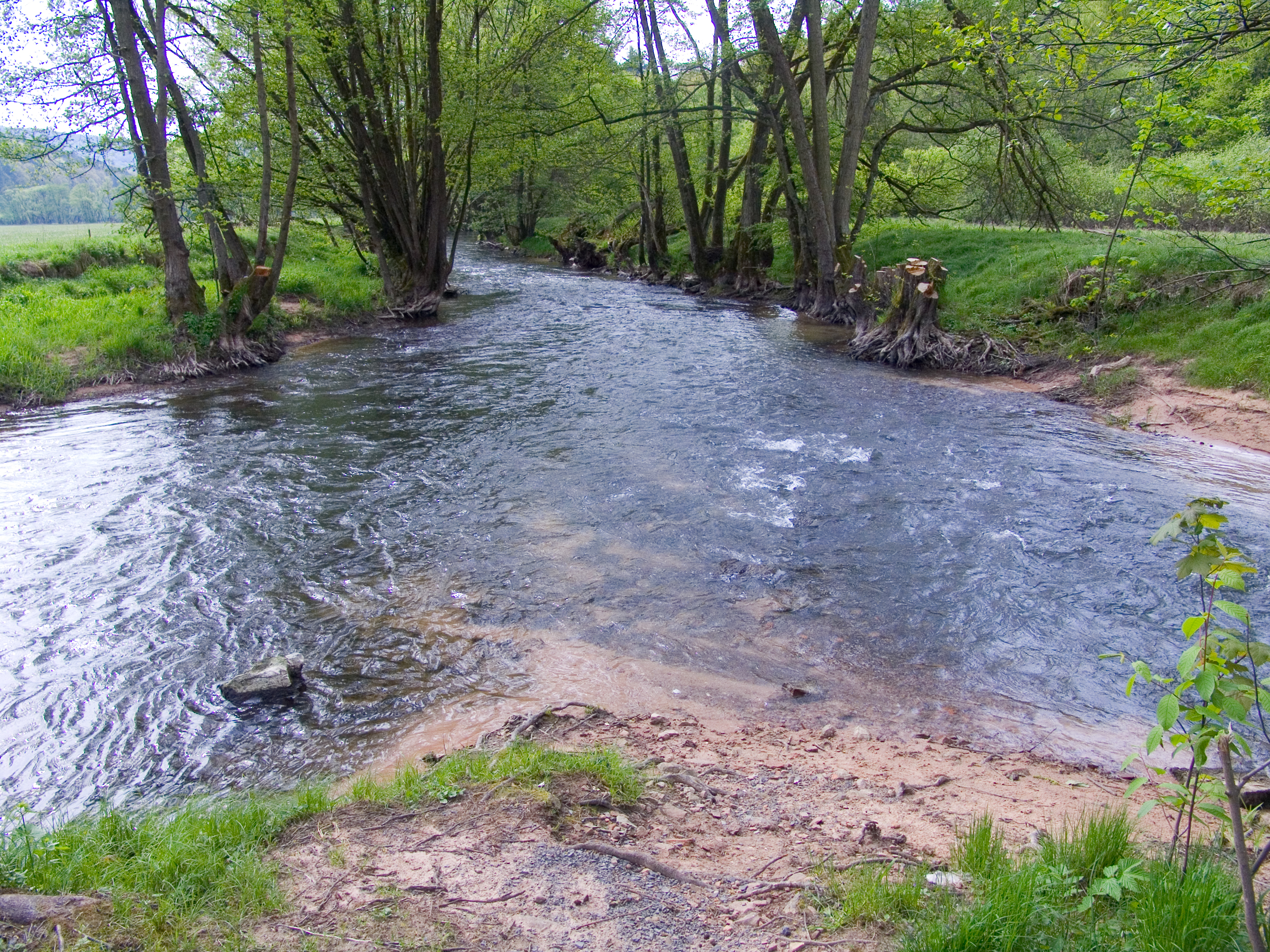
- The mouth of the Jossa

Location
- Country: Germany
- State: Hesse

Physical characteristics
- Source
  - location: Lettgenbrunn, a part of Jossgrund
  - elevation: circa 420 m (1,380 ft) above NN
- Mouth
  - location: Jossa, a part of Sinntal
  - coordinates: 50.2367°N 9.6003°E
  - elevation: circa 220 m (720 ft) above NN
- Length: 32.4 km (20.1 mi)
- Basin size: 146.6 km^{2} (56.6 sq mi)

Basin features
- Progression: Sinn→ Franconian Saale→ Main→ Rhine→ North Sea
- Tributaries
  - left: Breitenbach, Distelbach, Rohrbach
  - right: Villbach, Hungerbach, Kalbach, Mohrenbach, Steinbach

Jossa (German pronunciation: [ˈjɔsa]) is a river of Hesse, Germany. It is a tributary of the Sinn, which in turn flows into the Franconian Saale shortly before the latter discharges into the Main at Gemünden am Main.

== Course ==
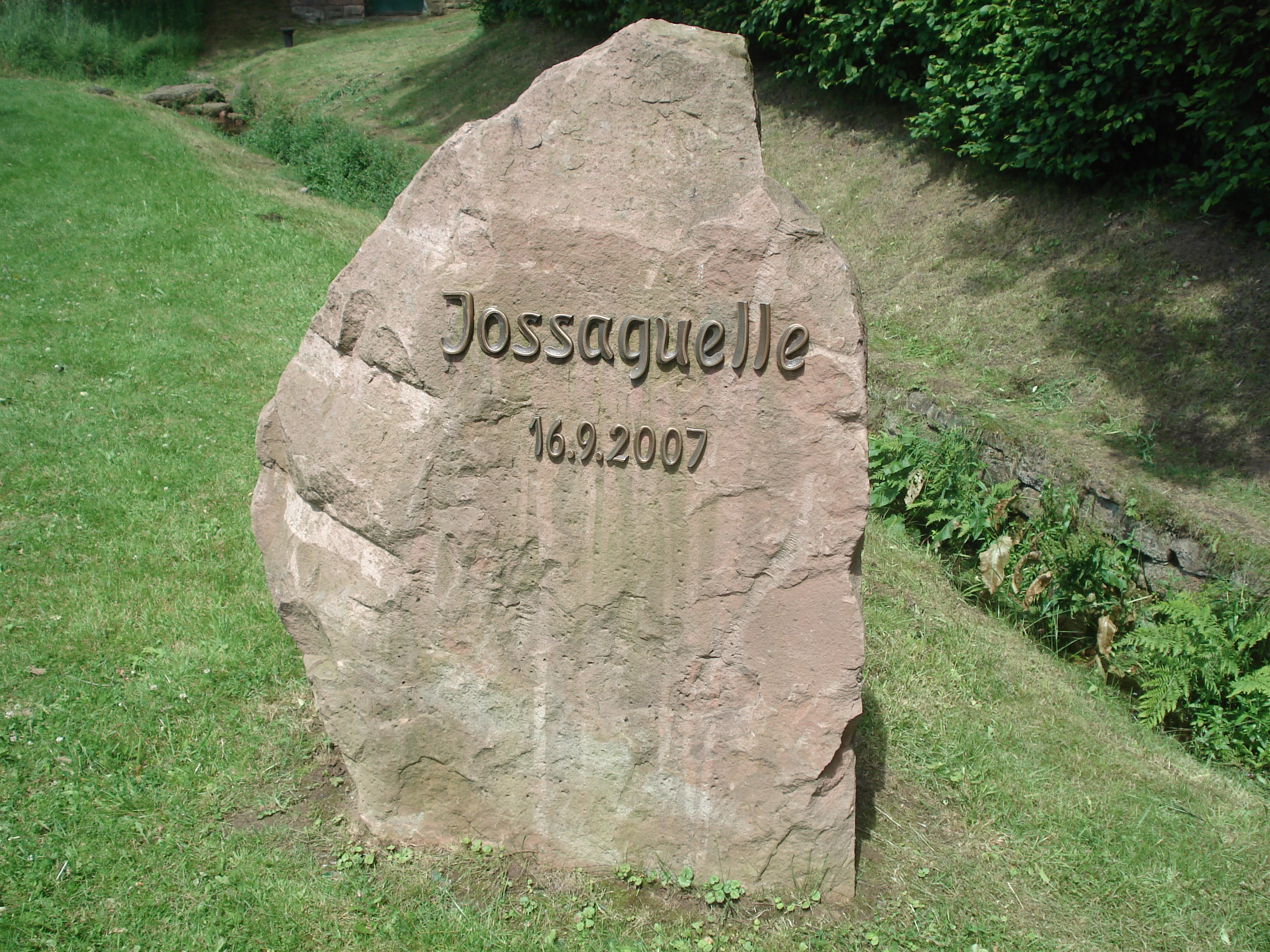
Boulder marking the source of the Jossa

The Jossa has a length of 32.3 kilometres.

It originates at Lettgenbrunn, an Ortsteil of Jossgrund. Here the Villbach is joined by the Lettgenbrunner Quelle. Since 2007, the place has been marked by a large boulder.

The Jossa then flows southeast before turning northwards. Passing Pfaffenhausen and Oberndorf (two other parts of Jossgrund), it gradually turns east north of Mernes, part of Bad Soden-Salmünster. Its northernmost point is near Marjoß (part of Steinau an der Strasse) and it then flows southeast to discharge into the Sinn at Jossa, a part of Sinntal.

== Watershed ==
The Jossa and its tributaries drain an area of around 146.7 square kilometres. It marks the border of the area that drains to the east towards the Sinn. To the west and north lies the Kinzig watershed.

== Natural history ==
Beavers have been successfully reintroduced since 1987/88 in the Jossa and Sinn valleys. From an original population of 18 beavers (from the Elbe river), their numbers had grown to more than 200 towards the end of the first decade in the 21st century.

== See also ==
- List of rivers of Hesse
