= Bad Orb =

- Town
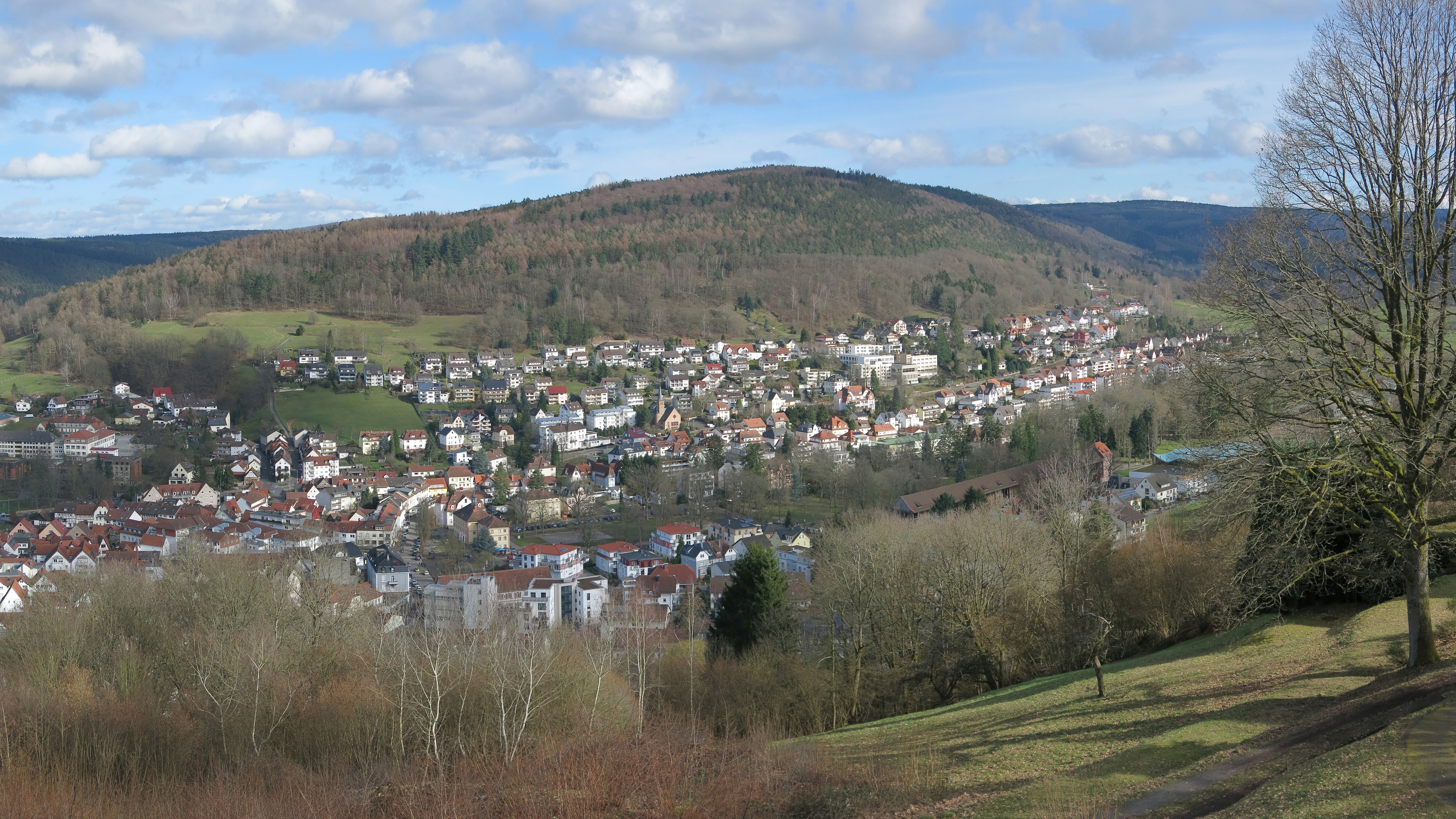
- Bad Orb seen from Molkenberg

- Coat of arms

- Location of Bad Orb within Main-Kinzig-Kreis district
- Interactive map of Bad Orb
- Location within Germany Location within Hesse
- Coordinates: 50°13′N 09°21′E
- Country: Germany
- State: Hesse
- Admin. region: Darmstadt
- District: Main-Kinzig-Kreis

Government
  - Mayor (2021–27): Tobias Weisbecker (CDU)

Area
  - Total: 47.75 km^{2} (18.44 sq mi)
- Elevation: 200–250 m (660–820 ft)

Population (2025-12-31)
  - Total: 9,930
  - Density: 208/km^{2} (539/sq mi)
- Time zone: UTC+01:00 (CET)
  - Summer (DST): UTC+02:00 (CEST)
- Postal codes: 63619
- Dialling codes: 06052
- Vehicle registration: MKK, GN, SLÜ
- Website: stadt-bad-orb.de

Bad Orb (German: [baːt ˈɔʁp]; "Thermae on the Orb River") is a spa town in the Main-Kinzig-Kreis district of Hesse, Germany. It is situated 32 kilometres (20 mi) east of Hanau between the forested hills of the Spessart. Bad Orb has a population of over 10,000. Its economy is dominated by the health and tourism sectors.

== Geography ==
=== Location ===
Constituent communities

Bad Orb is located in the valley of the Orb, a tributary of the Kinzig. The town is surrounded by the wooded hills of the Spessart, including the Wintersberg. The closest larger cities are Hanau, Aschaffenburg and Frankfurt to the southwest and Fulda to the northeast.

=== Neighboring communities ===
From the north, clockwise, Bad Orb borders on Wächtersbach, Bad Soden-Salmünster, the unincorporated area Gutsbezirk Spessart, Jossgrund and Biebergemünd.

== History ==
The region was inhabited by Celts by c. 650 BC, but it is not known whether they were aware of the local salt deposits.

In 1054 Henry IV, Holy Roman Emperor gifted the area around Orb (Orbaha) to the Stift St. Stefan at Mainz, it thus came under the control of the Electorate of Mainz, a part of which it remained until 1803. Bad Orb was first documented in 1059. Orb is referred to as a town for the first time in the 13th century.

Town privileges included the minting of a coin, the Orber Hälbling ("half-Pfennig of Orb"). The remains of the town wall that still exist today also originate from this time.

The historic trading route (and modern day long-distance hiking trail) Eselsweg ("donkey trail") that runs to Großheubach in the district of Miltenberg from Schlüchtern originates at Bad Orb. In the past, this route was used to transport salt to the Main.

The extraction of salt from several salt springs formed the town. There were eleven Salinen (one of which has been renovated and preserved), sometimes called "thorn houses" or "salt works", belonging in the decoction facility, in which brine dripped over a total length of 2,050 meters (6,730 ft) of blackthorn twigs in order to raise the salt concentration of the water before boiling. Salt production reached its high point in the 17th and 18th centuries.

After mediatisation, by way of the Principality of Aschaffenburg and the Grand Duchy of Frankfurt Orb eventually came to the Kingdom of Bavaria in 1814. Spa activities started as early as 1837. After the Austro-Prussian War of 1866, Bad Orb became Prussian in 1867. In 1884, a children's medical facility was founded by the brothers Friedrich Hufnagel and Wilhelm Hufnagel, which today is known as the Spessart-Klinik. After 1900, brine began to be used as an alternative medicine. In 1899 salt production ceased at Orb. Bad Orb was named a nationally certified spa town in 1909. The remaining salina today is used for medical treatments, especially inhalation and relaxation.

From 1939 to 1945, Bad Orb was the site of a prisoner-of-war camp named Stalag IX-B located on the nearby hill, Wegscheideküppel. The camp held Soviet, American, French, Italian and Serbian soldiers. Toward the end of the war the conditions at Stalag IX-B deteriorated precipitously, as a result of poor supply and scarcity of fuel. There is a monument to the Soviet dead located at a graveyard south of the former camp site.

With the end of the Prussian state, Bad Orb became a part of Hesse.

== Economy ==
Bad Orb is a spa town. Hospitals, rehabilitation and physical therapy facilities and medical doctors dominate. Next to the health sector, tourism is the most important industry.

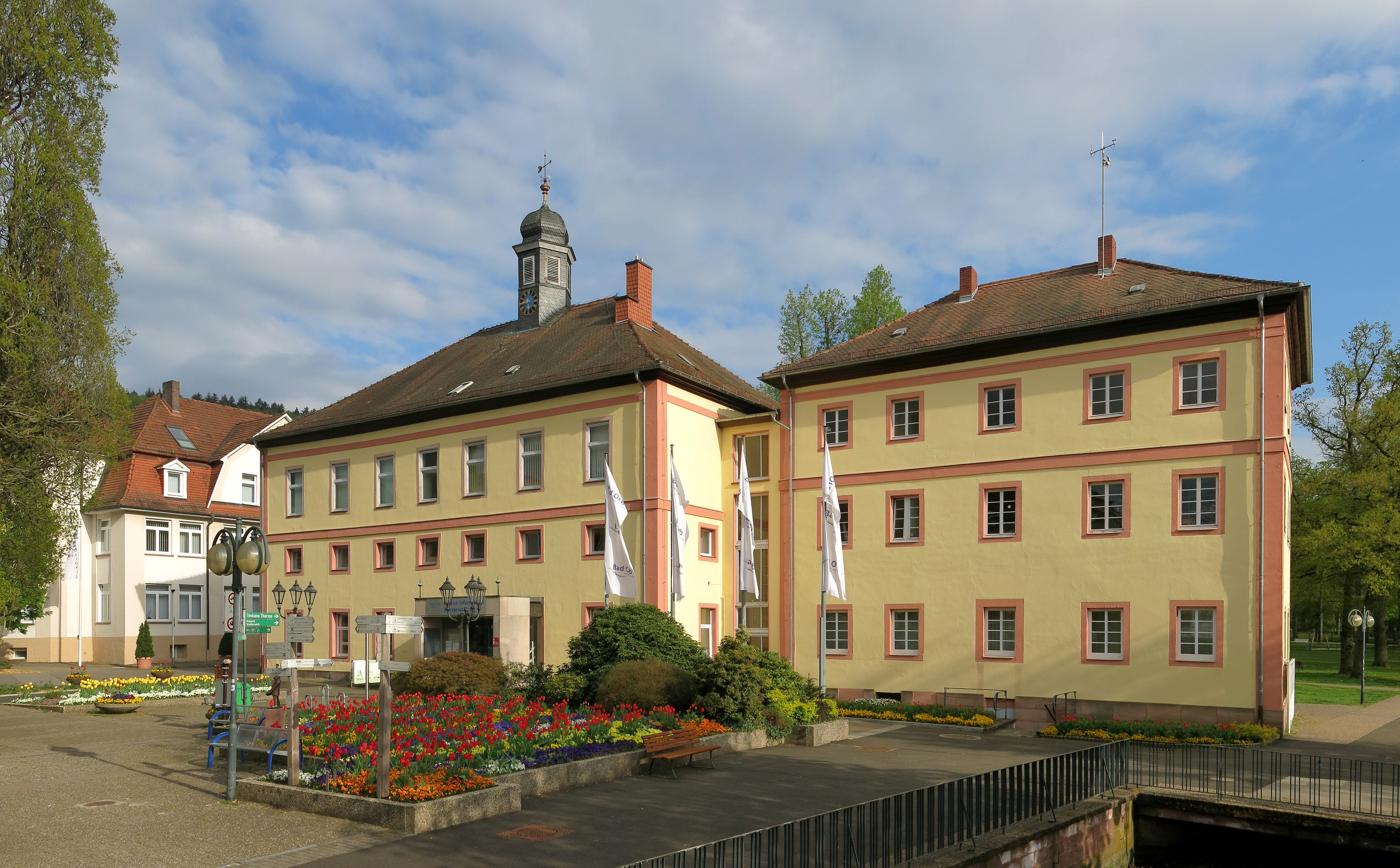
Former town hall, today tourist information

== Mayors ==
- 2021 - incumbent: Tobias Weisbecker (CDU)
- 2016 - 2021: Roland Weiß
- 2010 - March 2016 Helga Uhl
- 1998 - 2010 Wolfgang Storck (CDU)

=== Town twinning ===
Twinned with: Istra, Russia

== Attractions ==
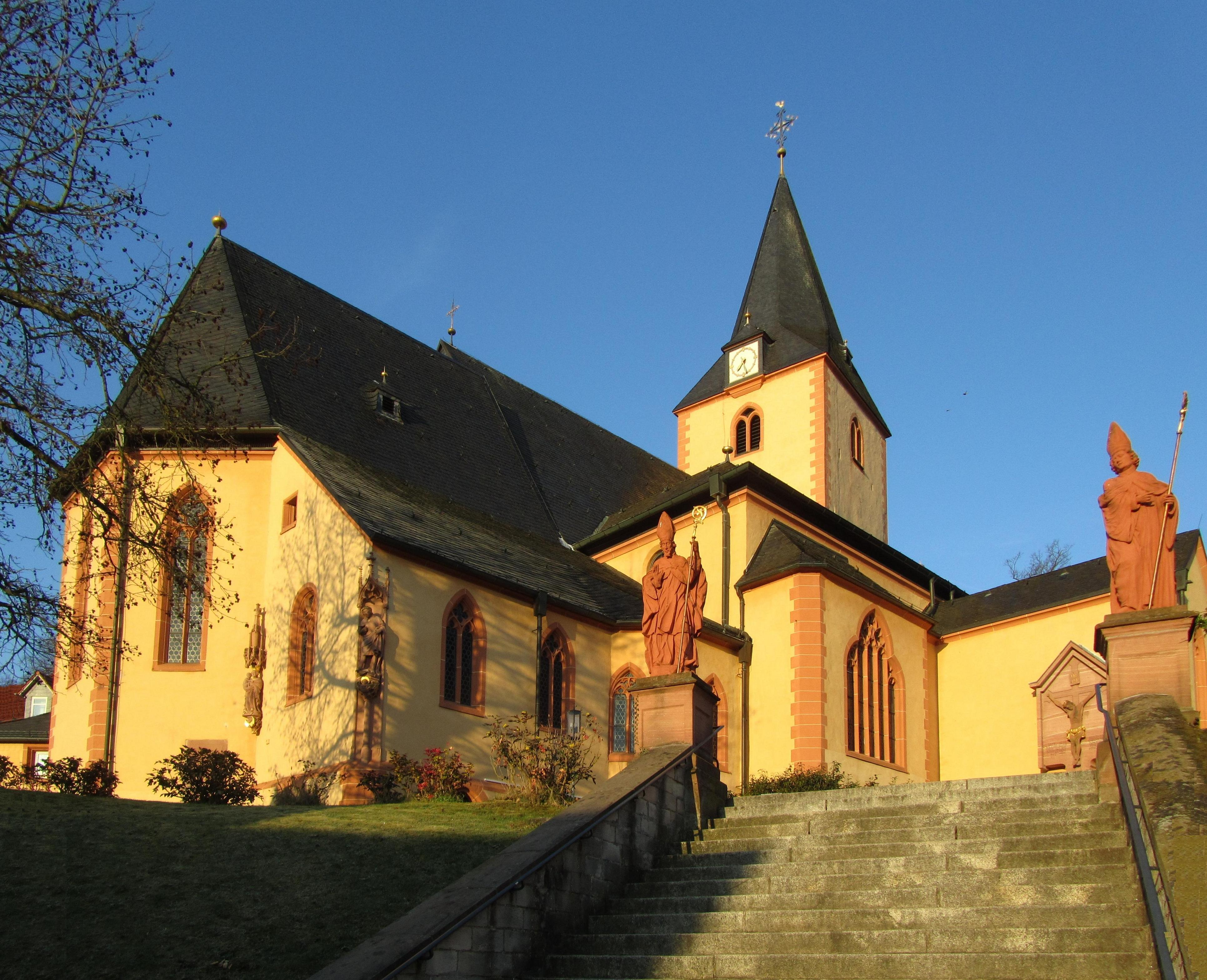
St. Martin

Bad Orb features an old town with numerous half-timbered houses, surrounded by the extensive remains of the medieval town wall including towers and a gate house. Notable examples of architecture include the buildings in Hauptstraße, the Henkershaus, Alt-Orb, Goldenes Rad and Salzgrafenhaus. The old castle hosts a town museum.

There are two churches: St. Martin is a Gothic hall church from the 14th century. It burned down in 1983, but was rebuilt in 1984 and 1995. Martin-Luther-Kirche was built 1902 and 1903 in Gothic Revival style. It features two loaned bells from Silesia and East Prussia. The altar bible was a gift from Empress Augusta Victoria of Schleswig-Holstein.

The town offers many amenities to the spa guests, including the Saline and the Kurpark. The forests around Bad Orb sport a network of hiking and biking trails.

There is also the Spessart Wildpark, established in 1937, closed under a new leaseholder in 2014, who stepped back in 2021. Its future is not clear by 2022.

== Infrastructure ==
Bad Orb is home to the Frankfurter Schullandheim Wegscheide, a summer camp for children founded in 1920 on the grounds of the former army training camp which served as a POW camp in World War II, and the "Spessart Clinic", a children's hospital founded in 1884.

=== Utilities ===
Like in other communities in the area, such as Biebergemünd, Flörsbachtal and Jossgrund, there is currently controversy over plans to build towering wind farms on the wooded peaks surrounding the town of Bad Orb. Environmentalists and many locals reject these plans due to the destruction of forests and animal habitats, possible health risks to residents, as well as threats to local property values and, in particular, to the tourism/spa business as a result of a declining attractiveness of the region to visitors and patients. It is also questioned whether local winds are strong and constant enough to allow economical operation of the wind farms.

== Notable people ==
=== Sons and daughters of the town ===
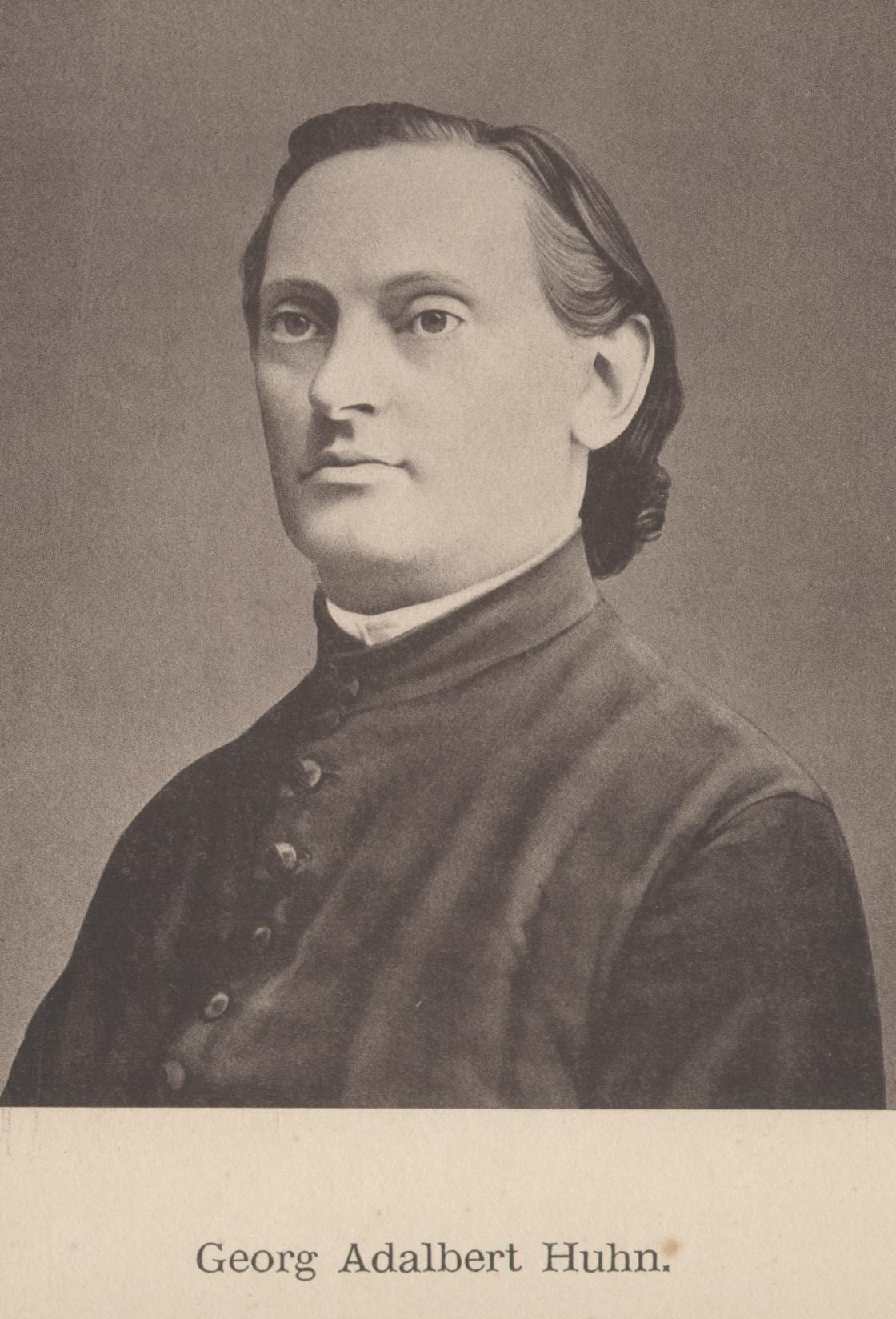
Georg Adalbert Huhn in 1880

- Klaus Feindler (King of Bad Orb 1928-2021)
- Karl von Braun (1832-1903), jurist
- Georg Adalbert Huhn (1839-1903), parish priest and prelate in Munich, Member of the Bavarian Parliament
- Gregor Kraus (1841-1915), botanist and university professor; Founder of microclimatology
- Burkhard Oly (1938-2008), sculptor and goldsmith

=== People associated with Bad Orb ===
- Helmut Jahn (1936-2013), painter, lived in Bad Orb
- Franz Leopold Koch (1782-1850), pharmacist, founder and operator of the first bathhouse in Orb.
- Franz Josef Scherf (1865-1929), doctor and spa director in Bad Orb (1905-1929), member of the provincial Landtag Kassel (1926-1929)
