= Krebsbach =

Krebsbach may refer to:

== People with the surname ==
- Astrid Krebsbach (1913-1995), German table tennis player
- Eduard Krebsbach (1894–1947), German SS doctor in Nazi Mauthausen concentration camp
- Karen Krebsbach (born 1940), American politician

== Settlements ==
- Fântânele (German: Krebsbach bei Hermannstadt), a village in Săliște town, Sibiu County, Romania
- Crizbav (German: Krebsbach), a commune in Braşov County, Romania

== Rivers ==
=== In Germany ===
- Krebsbach (Fallbach), tributary of the Fallbach near Hanau, Hesse
- Krebsbach (Haferbach), tributary of the Haferbach in Lippe district, North Rhine-Westphalia
- Krebsbach (Itz), tributary of the Itz in Upper Franconia, Bavaria
- Krebsbach (Kahl), tributary of the Kahl in Lower Franconia, Bavaria
- Krebsbach (Nidder), tributary of the Nidder in Hesse
- Krebsbach (Paar), tributary of the Paar in Bavaria
- Krebsbach (Rodach), tributary of the Rodach near Kronach, Bavaria
- Krebsbach (Schwarzbach), tributary of the Schwarzbach im Kraichgau, Baden-Württemberg
- Krebsbach (Selke), tributary of the Selke, Saxony-Anhalt
- Krebsbach (Steinach), tributary of the Steinach near Kronach, Bavaria
- Krebsbach (Westliche Günz), a river of Bavaria, Germany
- Krebsbach (Würm), tributary of the Würm in Baden-Württemberg

=== In other countries ===
- Rekowa (German: Krebsbach), tributary of the Rega in Poland
- Krisbach (German: Krebsbach), tributary of the Fensch, Grand Est region, France
