= Weissbach =

Weissbach or Weißbach may refer to:

== People ==
- Herbert Weißbach (1901–1995), German actor
- Karl Weißbach (1841–1905), German architect and university lecturer
- Linus Weissbach (born 1998), Swedish ice hockey player
- Teresa Weißbach (born 1981), German actress best known for her role as Miriam in the 1999 film Sonnenallee
- Zeev Nehari (born Willi Weissbach; 1915–1978), mathematician who worked on Complex Analysis, Univalent Functions Theory and Differential and Integral Equations

== Places ==
- Weißbach, Baden-Württemberg, a municipality in Baden-Württemberg, Germany
- Weißbach, Thuringia, a municipality in Thuringia, Germany
- Weißbach bei Lofer, a municipality in the state of Salzburg, Austria
- Bílý Potok (Liberec District), German name Weißbach, a village in the Liberec Region of the Czech Republic
- Panchià, German name Weissbach, a comune in Trentino in the northern Italian region Trentino-Alto Adige/Südtirol

== Rivers ==
- Weißbach (Schneizlreuth), a river of Bavaria, Germany, tributary of the Saalach, in the areas of the municipalities Inzell and Schneizlreuth
- Weißbach (Lattengebirge), a river of Bavaria, Germany, tributary of the Saalach, its source at the Dreisesselberg, Lattengebirge
- Weißbach (Roda), a river of Thuringia, Germany, left tributary of the Roda
- Weissbach (Schwarzbach), a river of Hesse, Germany, tributary of the Schwarzbach
- Tuffbach (Inn), locally also known as Weissbach, a short river in Innsbruck, Austria

== Other ==
- Weissbach Formation, a geologic formation in Austria
