= Lippersdorf-Erdmannsdorf =

- Municipality
- Location of Lippersdorf-Erdmannsdorf within Saale-Holzland-Kreis district
- Interactive map of Lippersdorf-Erdmannsdorf
- Location within Germany Location within Thuringia
- Coordinates: 50°50′0″N 11°47′30″E
- Country: Germany
- State: Thuringia
- District: Saale-Holzland-Kreis
- Municipal assoc.: Hügelland/Täler

Government
  - Mayor (2022–28): Mario Nojack

Area
  - Total: 9.97 km^{2} (3.85 sq mi)
- Elevation: 230 m (750 ft)

Population (2025-12-31)
  - Total: 457
  - Density: 45.8/km^{2} (119/sq mi)
- Time zone: UTC+01:00 (CET)
  - Summer (DST): UTC+02:00 (CEST)
- Postal codes: 07646
- Dialling codes: 036426
- Vehicle registration: SHK, EIS, SRO
- Website: www.huegelland-taeler.de

Lippersdorf-Erdmannsdorf is a municipality in the district Saale-Holzland, in Thuringia, Germany.

== Geography ==
The community consists of a two-row village Reihendorf in the valley of the Roda and is one of the so-called valley villages. The two streets on which the fields and properties are located run parallel to the stream that flows in the middle of the town. The neighboring towns are Ottendorf about 2 km to the east, Weißbach about 2 km south, the district Erdmannsdorf about 1 km west. The Landesstraße L 1062 runs through the town, which flows into the state road L 1073 near the east-running A 9 at Tautendorf and leads to Kahla in the west.

== History ==
Lippersdorf was probably founded in the 12th century on land cleared by German settlers, whose leader was probably called Liebrecht. According to Wolfgang Kahl, the first documented mention of Lippersdorf was on 29 December 1293 and that of Erdmannsdorf on 31 March 1206. However, the Hügelland-Täler administrative community notes on its website that during research in the Thuringian Main State Archives, the original document identified could not be found and that the first verifiable written mention of Lippersdorf was in a Document Friedrich the Strict from 1350 that was found in the Altenburg State Archives. In 1543, brothers Apel and Kunz von Meusebach bought the villages and manors of Lippersdorf and Erdmannsdorf. When the family died out in 1753, the manors reverted to the sovereignty of Saxe-Gotha-Altenburg, and in 1825 to the Duchy of Saxe-Altenburg.

During the GDR era, the "Volkseigene Kombinat Großhandel WtB" (State-owned Combined Wholesaler) built and maintained the holiday camp “Philipp Müller” in Lippersdorf for the children of its employees.
