= Weissbach (Schwarzbach) =

River in Germany

Location
- Country: Germany
- State: Hesse

Physical characteristics
- Mouth
  - location: Schwarzbach
  - coordinates: 50.3675°N 9.6265°E

Basin features
- Progression: Schwarzbach→ Elmbach→ Kinzig→ Main→ Rhine→ North Sea

Weissbach (Weißbach in german) is a small river of Hesse, Germany. It is a left tributary of the Schwarzbach in Schlüchtern-Gundhelm. The Schwarzbach river originates on the north side of the Dreisesselberg (Bavarian Forest) mountain.

== See also ==
- List of rivers of Hesse
