= Weißbach (Roda) =

Location
- Country: Germany
- State: Thuringia

Physical characteristics
- Mouth
  - location: Roda
  - coordinates: 50.8296°N 11.7890°E

Basin features
- Progression: Roda→ Saale→ Elbe→ North Sea

Weißbach is a river of Thuringia, Germany. It is a left tributary of the Roda.

== History ==
The river originates near the River Roda and continues flowing in the area of the side valleys though the villages of Karlsdorf and Weißbach and continues to flow into the Roda near Lippersdorf.

== See also ==
- List of rivers of Thuringia
