= Schwarzbach (Elmbach) =

River in Germany

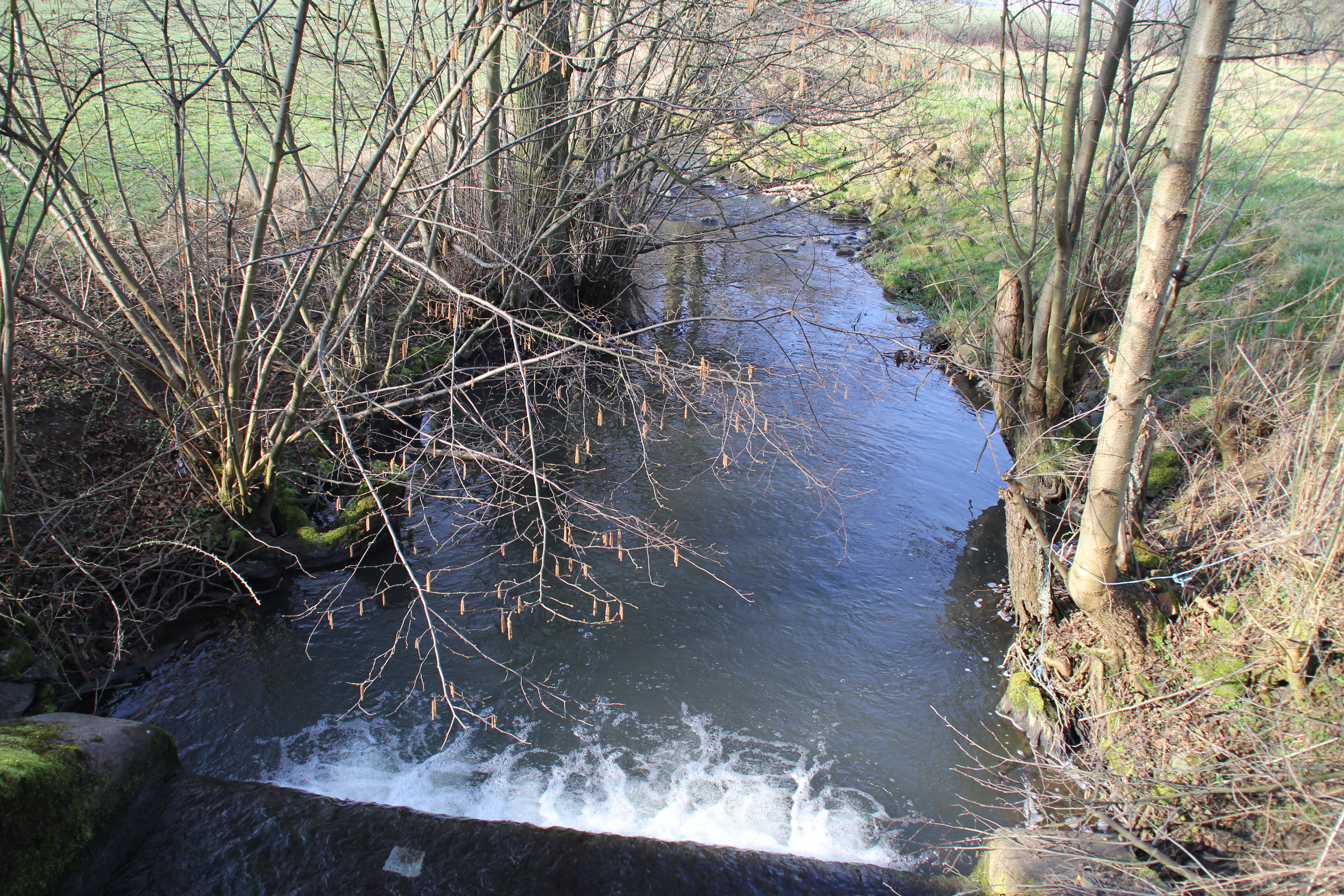

Location
- Country: Germany
- State: Hesse

Physical characteristics
- Mouth
  - location: Elmbach
  - coordinates: 50.3589°N 9.5518°E
- Length: 11.6 km (7.2 mi)

Basin features
- Progression: Elmbach→ Kinzig→ Main→ Rhine→ North Sea

Schwarzbach (German pronunciation: [ˈʃvaʁtsˌbax]) is a river of Hesse, Germany. It is a left tributary of the Elmbach in Schlüchtern-Elm.

== See also ==
- List of rivers of Hesse
