= Siekbach =

Siekbach may refer to:

- Siekbach (Werre), a river of North Rhine-Westphalia, Germany, tributary of the Werre
- Siekbach, a river of Germany, tributary of the Exter
- Siekbach, a river of Germany, tributary of the Haferbach
- Siekbach, a river of Germany, tributary of the Oetternbach
