= Ahlersbach =

Ahlersbach may refer to:

- Ahlersbach (Schlüchtern), a village in the municipality of Schlüchtern, Hesse, Germany
- Ahlersbach (Kinzig, Schlüchtern-Herolz), a river of Hesse, Germany
- Ahlersbach (Kinzig, Schlüchtern-Niederzell), a river of Hesse, Germany
