= Gruttbach =

River in Germany

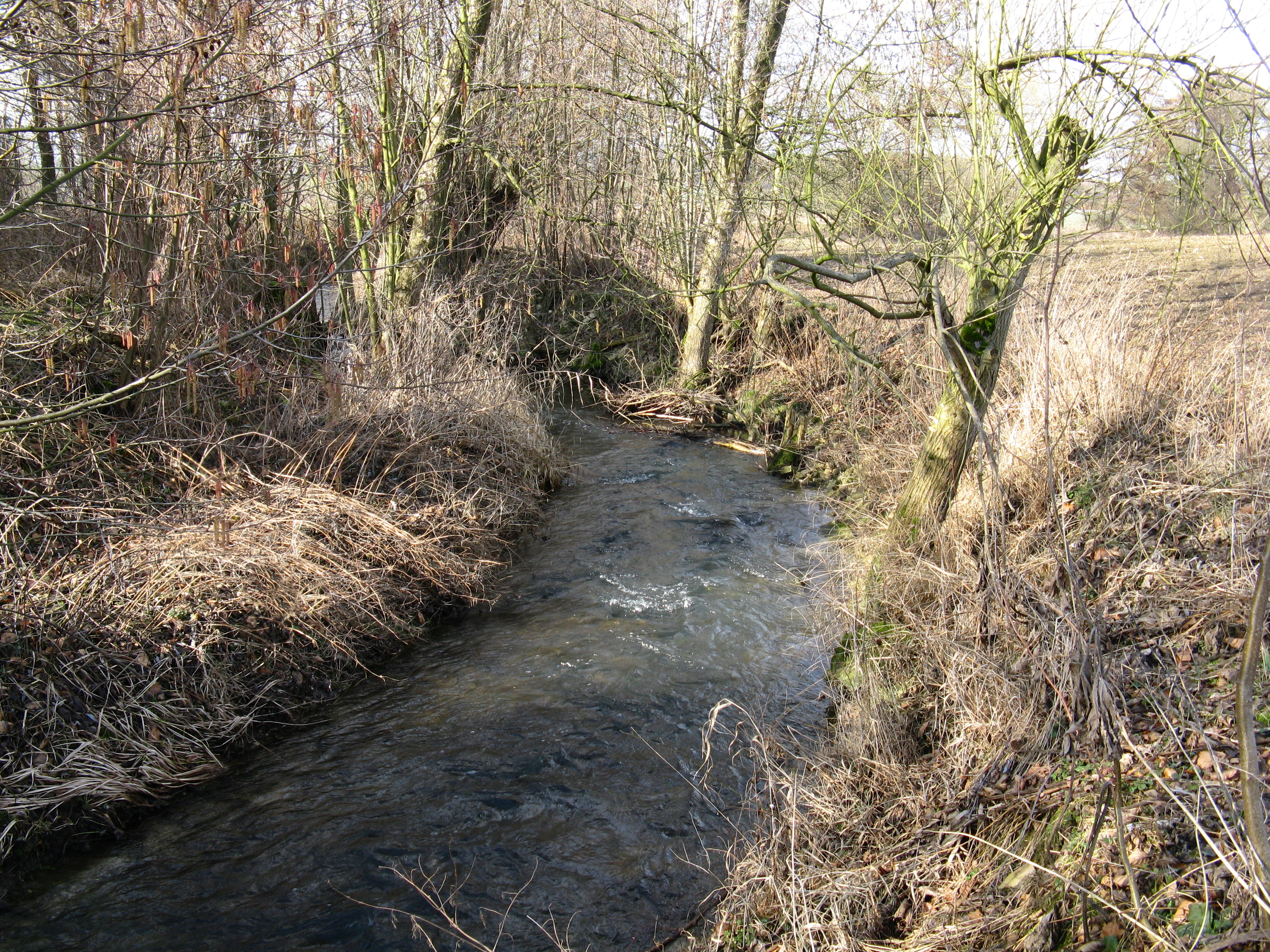

Location
- Country: Germany
- States: North Rhine-Westphalia

Physical characteristics
- Mouth
  - location: Haferbach
  - coordinates: 52°00′18″N 8°44′39″E

Basin features
- Progression: Haferbach→ Werre→ Weser→ North Sea

Gruttbach is a small river of North Rhine-Westphalia, Germany. It flows into the Haferbach near Lage.

== Geography ==
The Gruttbach originates in the Billinghausen district of Lage on the north slope of the up to 206 m high Hörster Egge, not far from the L 945. From its source, the stream flows in a northern direction to Billinghauser Heide, where it joins the Gruttbach II. In the further course, the stream passes through Kachtenhausen and Ohrsen to the east and, right-banked, flows into the larger Haferbach behind the former Ohrsen sewage treatment plant (now Ohrsen pumping station). In terms of catchment area, length, and water flow, the Gruttbach is the largest tributary of the Haferbach.

== River Length ==
According to the information from the NRW State Survey Office, the length of the Gruttbach is given as 4.97 km and is referred to as "Gruttbach I." The stream "Gruttbach II" is given as being 1.64 km long. However, on the German basic map and in linguistic usage, the stream is called "Gruttbach," and the Gruttbach II is referred to as the upper course of the Gruttbach. Gruttbach II originates approximately 500 m southwest of the source of Gruttbach I. Considering Gruttbach II as the upper course of Gruttbach results in a flow distance of 5.24 km.

== Tributaries ==
Depending on the perspective (see River Length section), the Gruttbach has two tributaries. Depending on which stream (Gruttbach I or Gruttbach II) is considered the upper course, the Gruttbach II is a left tributary of Gruttbach I or Gruttbach I is a right tributary of Gruttbach II. Another tributary of Gruttbach is the Sunderbach with a length of 3.9 km, which joins right-banked at KM 1.4 near Wissentrup.

== Environment ==
The Gruttbach is classified as Water Quality Class II, indicating that it is moderately polluted.

== See also ==
- List of rivers of North Rhine-Westphalia
