= Krebsbach (Fallbach) =

River in Hesse, Germany

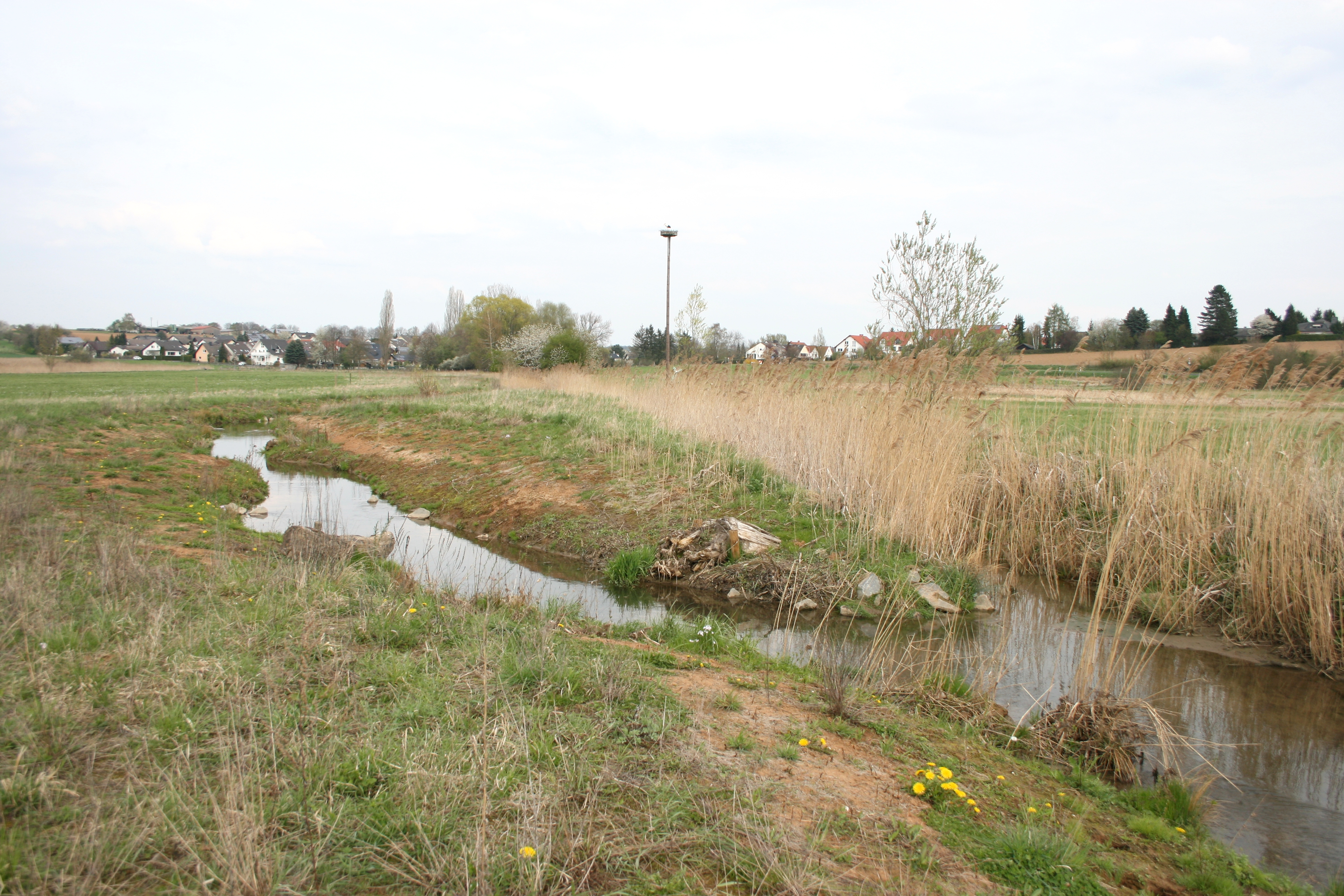

Location
- Country: Germany
- State: Hesse

Physical characteristics
- Mouth
  - location: Fallbach
  - coordinates: 50°08′58″N 8°54′55″E
- Length: 25.1 km (15.6 mi)

Basin features
- Progression: Fallbach→ Kinzig→ Main→ Rhine→ North Sea

Krebsbach is a river of Hesse, Germany. It flows into the Fallbach near Hanau.

== See also ==
- List of rivers of Hesse
