= Auerbach (Kinzig) =

River in Germany

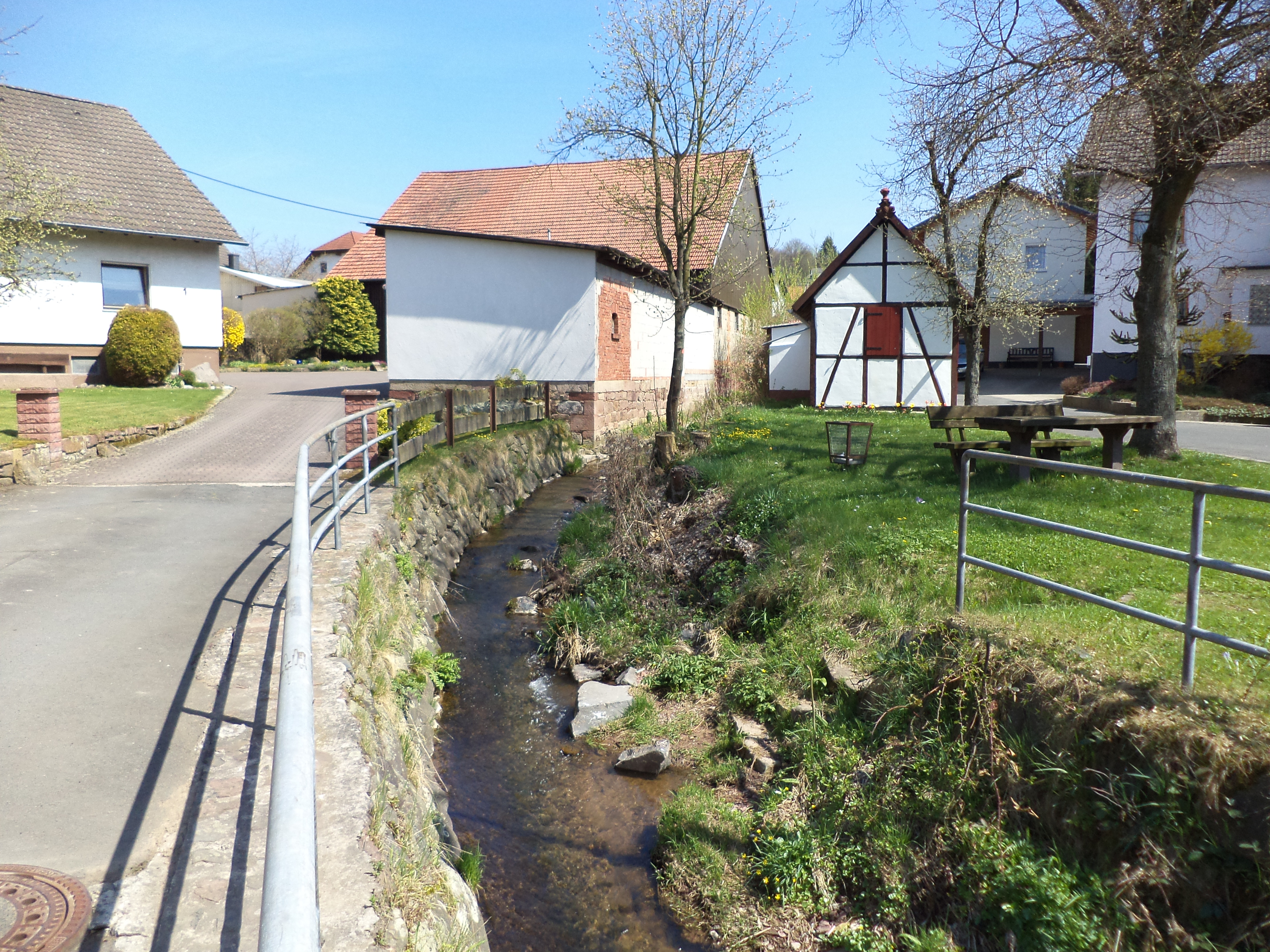

- Location of mouth in Hesse

Location
- Country: Germany
- State: Hesse

Physical characteristics
- Mouth
  - location: Kinzig
  - coordinates: 50.3296°N 9.4993°E

Basin features
- Progression: Kinzig→ Main→ Rhine→ North Sea

The Auerbach (German pronunciation: [ˈaʊɐbax]) is a small river of Hesse, Germany. It is a left and southern tributary of the Kinzig into which it flows in Schlüchtern-Niederzell. It starts from the Schwarzen Born at 428 meters above sea level south of Schlüchtern - Hohenzell. It flows north-west and into the Schlüchtern district of Niederzell at 191 meters above sea level from the left into the Kinzig. The river is 5.3 km long and ends 237 meters away from the start of the river. It has a mean bed gradient of about 45%.

== See also ==
- List of rivers of Hesse
