= Ramholzer Wasser =

River in Germany

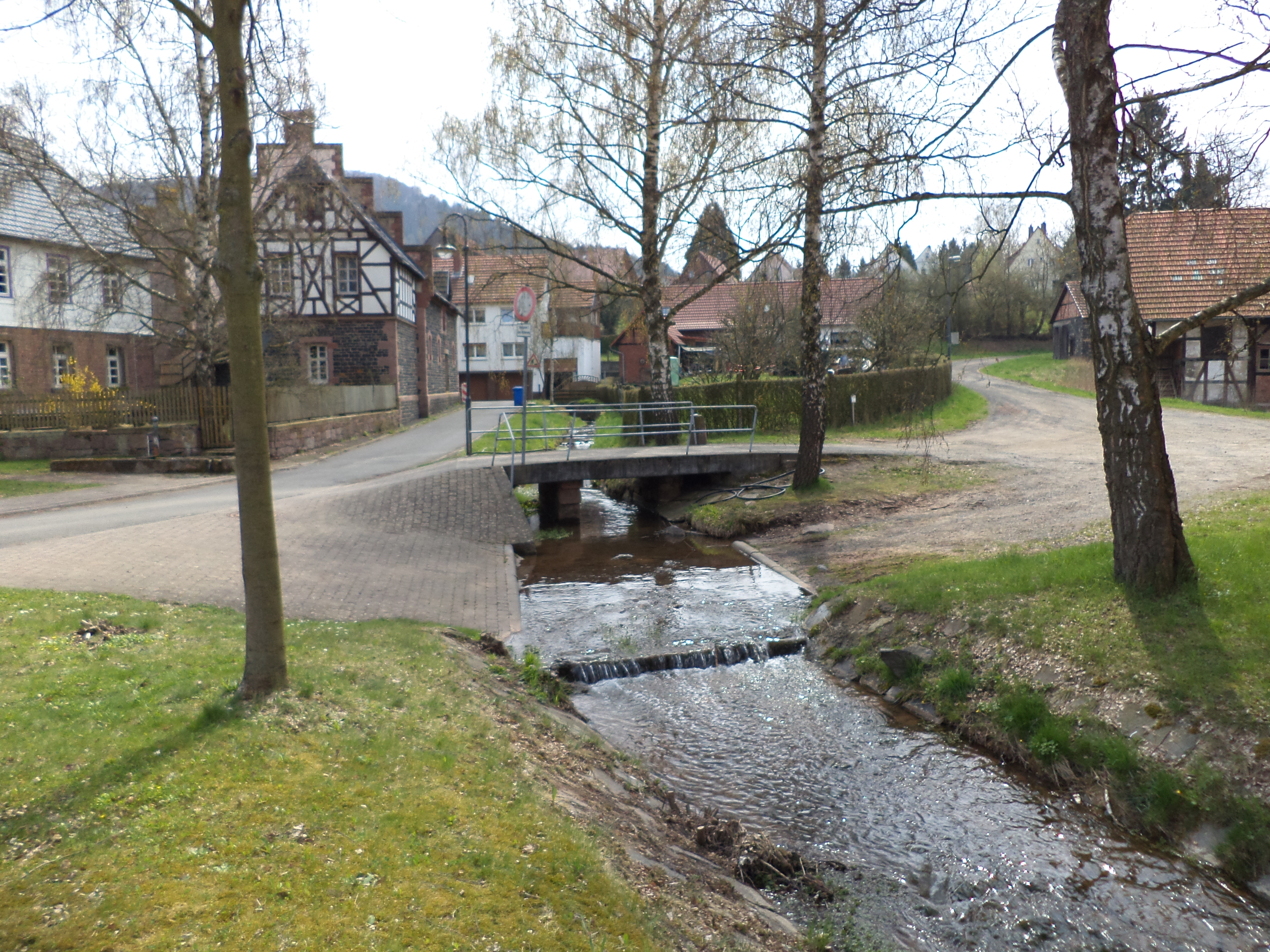

Location
- Country: Germany
- States: Hesse

Physical characteristics
- Mouth
  - location: Kinzig
  - coordinates: 50°20′25″N 9°35′11″E

Basin features
- Progression: Kinzig→ Main→ Rhine→ North Sea

Ramholzer Wasser is a small river of Hesse, Germany. It flows into the Kinzig east of Schlüchtern.

== See also ==
- List of rivers of Hesse
