= Karlsdorf =

Karlsdorf may refer to:

- Karlsdorf, Thuringia, a village in Germany
- Karlsdorf, Baden-Württemberg, a village in Germany, now part of Karlsdorf-Neuthard
- Karlsdorf, Ukraine, a former German-speaking colony in the modern-day Ukraine
- Karlsdorf, German name of Banatski Karlovac, a village in Serbia

== See also ==
- Kalsdorf bei Graz
