= Tröbnitz =

- Municipality
- Location of Tröbnitz within Saale-Holzland-Kreis district
- Interactive map of Tröbnitz
- Location within Germany Location within Thuringia
- Coordinates: 50°50′20″N 11°43′44″E
- Country: Germany
- State: Thuringia
- District: Saale-Holzland-Kreis
- Municipal assoc.: Hügelland/Täler

Government
  - Mayor (2022–28): Wolfgang Fiedler

Area
  - Total: 2.17 km^{2} (0.84 sq mi)
- Elevation: 205 m (673 ft)

Population (2025-12-31)
  - Total: 445
  - Density: 205/km^{2} (531/sq mi)
- Time zone: UTC+01:00 (CET)
  - Summer (DST): UTC+02:00 (CEST)
- Postal codes: 07646
- Dialling codes: 036428
- Vehicle registration: SHK, EIS, SRO
- Website: www.huegelland-taeler.de

Tröbnitz is a municipality in the district Saale-Holzland, in eastern Thuringia, Germany.

== History ==
In the 7th and 8th century the Slavs started to settle the areas along the Saale and Roda, two local rivers. The origin of the community Tröbnitz is most probably to find at a sorbian hamlet at the beginning of the 12th century. It is mentioned in a document from 29 September 1223 the first time. At this date Sorbs cleared the woodlands near the confluence of the Roda (former Rodaue) and the Rothehofbach.

Around 1300 Tröbnitz was the manor of earl Otto de Trebnitz, but later the earls of Meusebach owned it. Hans and Apitz, two earls from Meusebach, became the first medieval judges and landlords of the early settlement.

As the last member of the house of the Meusebacher died in 1753 things changed. The woodsmen decided to work as farmers. The new farmers bought huge areas of the former large scale land-holding and a long lasting economy was established. Up to the halfway of the 20th century the economical establishment in Tröbnitz was pushed on by the family Prager and later the families Letsch and John. They had had a similar influence on the development of this village as the earls from Meusebach in the past.

The rural structure remained till the foundation of the GDR. In 1956 a transformation of the small farms into a big cooperation took place (so called "LPGs", Landwirtschaftliche Produktionsgenossenschaften, were formed). With the separation of livestock production and agriculture in 1975 the traditional farming ended. The cooperations were less productive. That's why a mill that could grind and cut and a brewery were built at the beginning of the industrialization. After Germany was reunited the mill and the brewery were not competitive enough and so they had to be shut down.

=== The name of the village ===
The name Tröbnitz is based on the name "trebenic", as it was called around 1115. As languages can develop throughout the time, this name did as well: 1266 „Trebenitz“, 1300 „Trebnitz“ und um 1310 „Trebenicz“. The origin of this term is to find in the settlements of the slavs that lived in this region before. A lot of Slavic settlements that still exist have typical suffixes, like -ow, -in, -itz and –gast.

== Culture and sights ==
The so-called "Art and Music Village" is known for its two orchestras, the „Tröbnitzer Musikanten“ and the „Jugendblasorchester Tröbnitz“. You can find a museum that shows regional history, the YMCA and the "Klingenpresse", an art club, in Tröbnitz as well.
