= Riedbach (disambiguation) =

Riedbach is a municipality in the district of Haßberge in Bavaria in Germany.

Riedbach may also refer to:

- Riedbach (Bühler), a river of Baden-Württemberg, Germany, tributary of the Bühler
- Riedbach (Kinzig), a river of Hesse, Germany, tributary of the Kinzig
