= Grennelbach =

River of Hesse, Germany

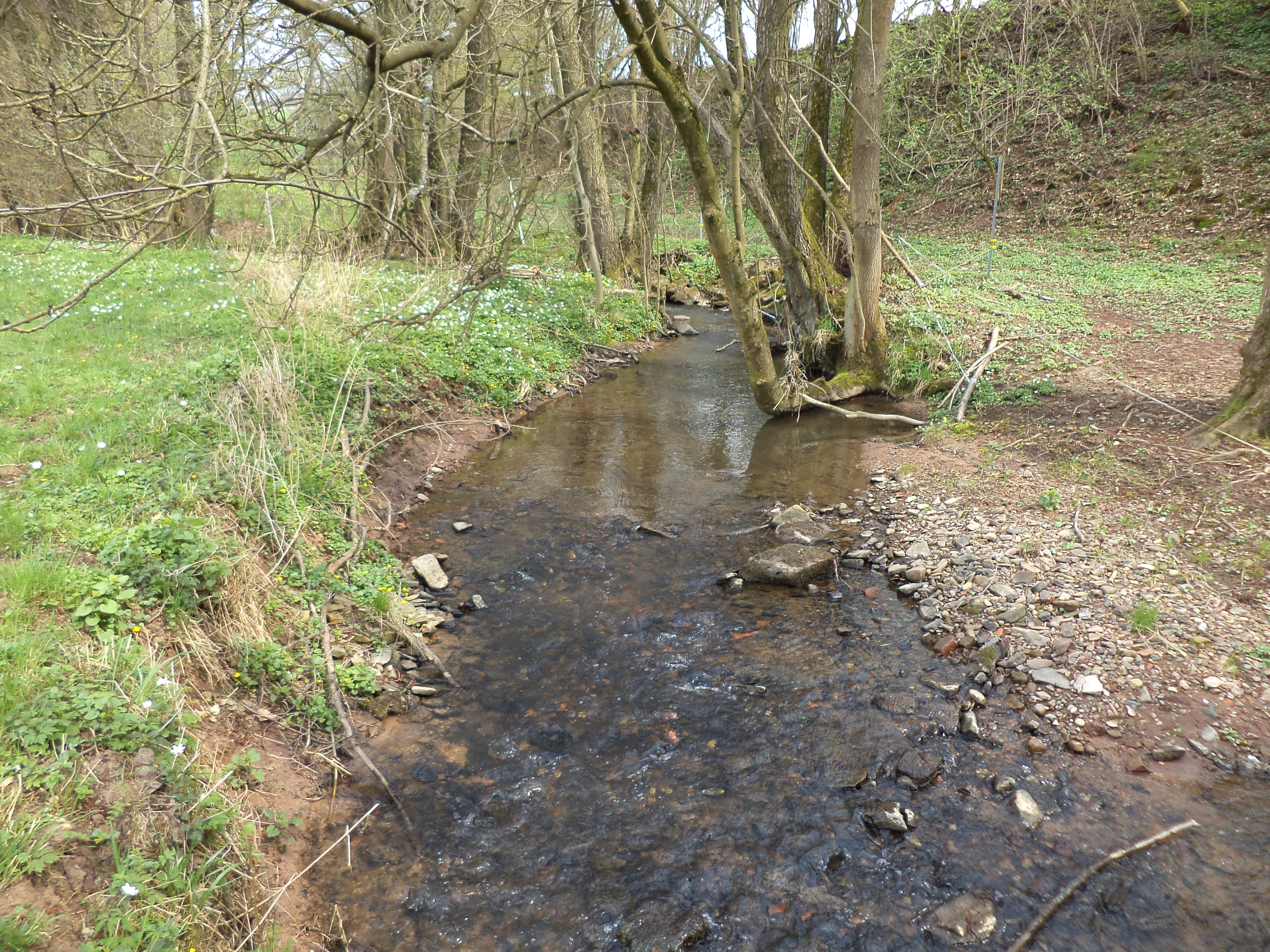

Location
- Country: Germany
- States: Hesse

Physical characteristics
- Mouth
  - location: Kinzig
  - coordinates: 50.3415°N 9.5826°E

Basin features
- Progression: Kinzig→ Main→ Rhine→ North Sea

Grennelbach is a small river of Hesse, Germany. It flows into the Kinzig near Schlüchtern-Vollmerz.

== See also ==
- List of rivers of Hesse
