= Kinzig =

Kinzig is the name of three rivers in southern Germany:

- Kinzig (Main), flowing into the Main
- Kinzig (Mümling), flowing into the Mümling, a tributary of the Main
- Kinzig (Rhine), flowing into the Rhine
