= East Hesse =

East Hesse (German: Osthessen) is an unofficial but common regional name for the eastern part of the German state of Hesse as well as a regional planning region. It corresponds roughly to the Hessian catchment area of Fulda and its heart covers the county of Fulda, the eastern part of the county of Vogelsbergkreis and the old counties of Hersfeld and Schlüchtern, but there is no clear boundary of East Hesse with North Hesse, Middle Hesse and South Hesse. In older sources, a landscape, roughly identical with the current East Hesse area, was commonly called Buchonia.

Occasionally the Bergwinkel region and county of Schlüchtern are counted as part of East Hesse. They lie south and over the other side of the watershed and drain via Kinzig into the River Main.
