= Bracht (river) =

River in Germany

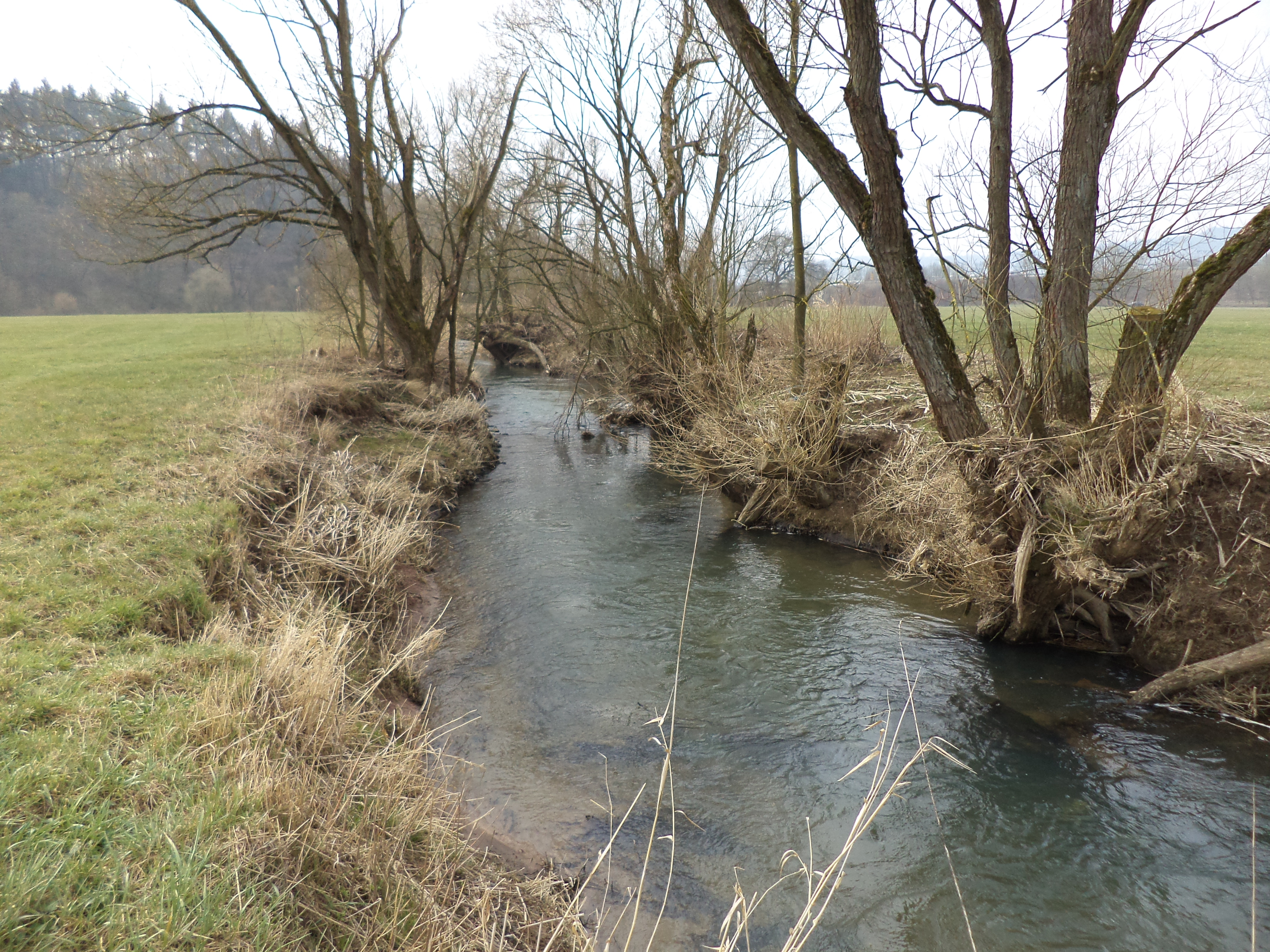

Location
- Country: Germany
- State: Hesse

Physical characteristics
- Mouth: Kinzig
  - location: Wächtersbach
  - coordinates: 50°15′14″N 9°18′13″E
- Length: 31.6 km (19.6 mi)
- Basin size: 118 km^{2} (46 sq mi)

Basin features
- Progression: Kinzig→ Main→ Rhine→ North Sea

The Bracht is a river of Hesse, Germany. It is a right-bank tributary of the Kinzig, into which it flows in Wächtersbach. In large sections, it formed the border between the former Grand Duchy of Hesse-Darmstadt, on the right bank, and the Kingdom of Prussia on the left bank. Even after WWII, this administrative segregation continued in different districts.

== See also ==
- List of rivers of Hesse
