= Gründau (river) =

River in Germany

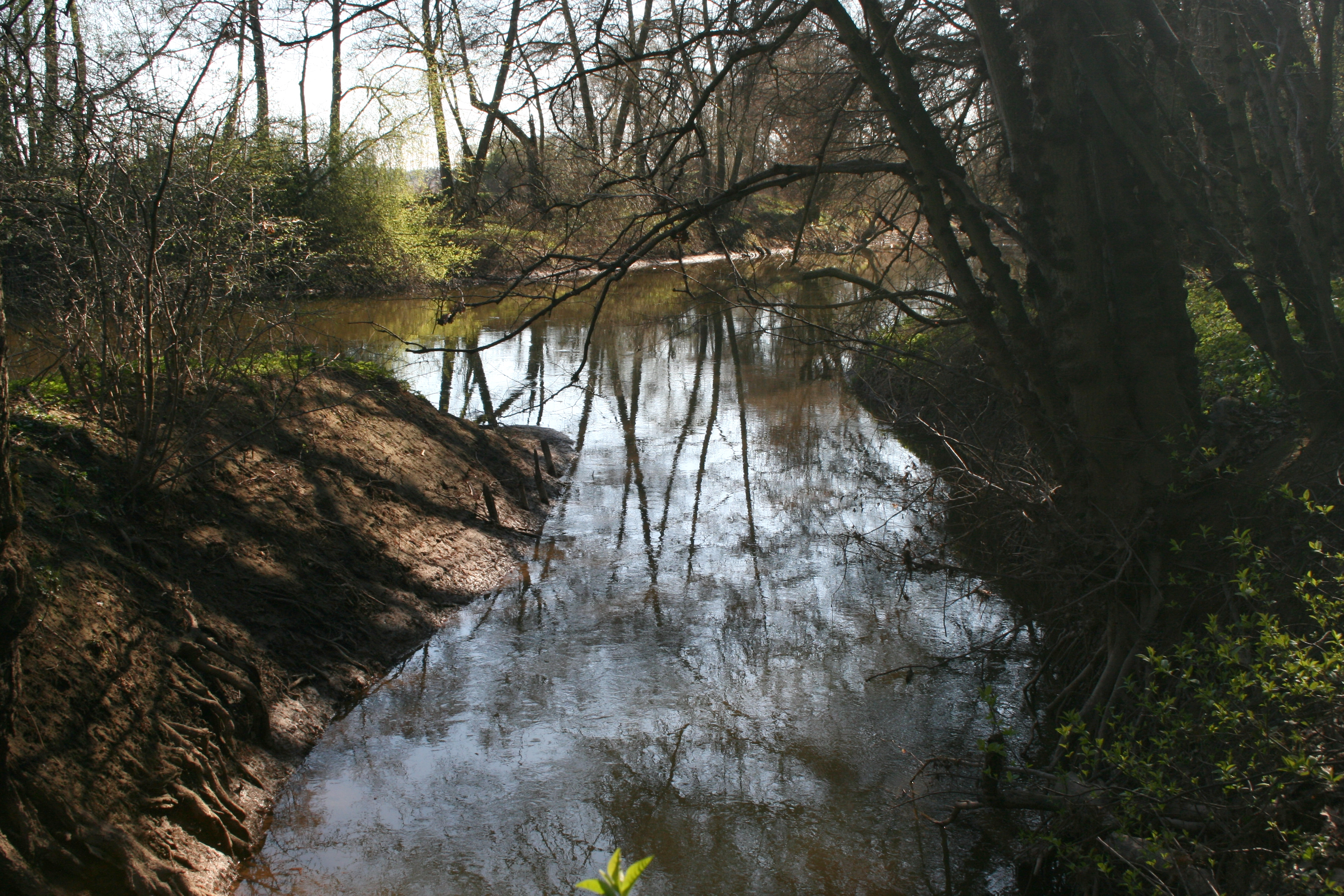

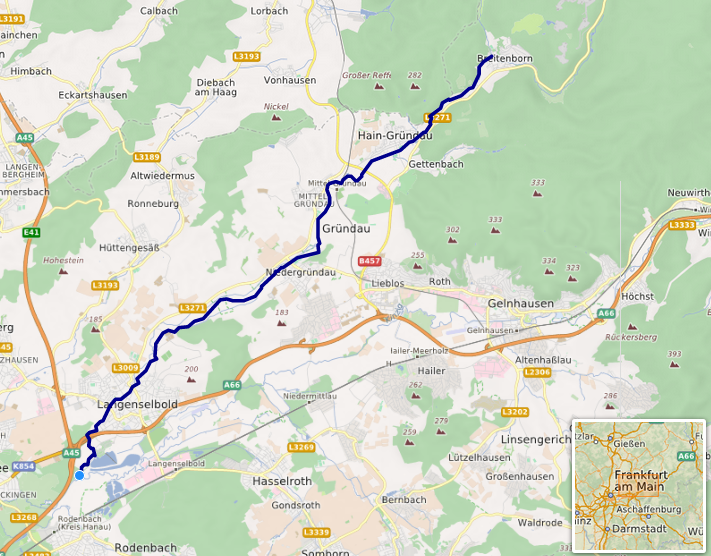
- Course of the Gründau (interactive map)

Location
- Country: Germany
- State: Hesse

Physical characteristics
- Mouth
  - location: Kinzig
  - coordinates: 50.1613°N 9.0214°E
- Length: 30.3 km (18.8 mi)
- Basin size: 95.7 km^{2} (36.9 sq mi)

Basin features
- Progression: Kinzig→ Main→ Rhine→ North Sea

The Gründau (German pronunciation: [ˈɡʁyːndaʊ]; in its upper course: Litterbach) is a river of Hesse, Germany. The Gründau rises as the Litterbach near Spielberg in the municipality of Brachttal. It flows into the Kinzig near Langenselbold.

== See also ==
- List of rivers of Hesse
