= Bergwinkel =

Region around the town of Schlüchtern in Germany

Bergwinkel is a region around the town of Schlüchtern in the county of Main-Kinzig-Kreis in East Hesse, Germany.

It describes a small region of the Landrücken, in which the foothills of the Brückenau Kuppenrhön to the east, the Sandstone Spessart to the south and the Southern Lower Vogelsberg to the west come together. In the dictionary, Wörterbuch der deutschen Sprache by Joachim Heinrich Campe, the German word Bergwinkel is generically defined as "an angle between hills, a valley, which ends between two hills in a sharp angle."

In Schlüchtern there is the Bergwinkel Museum. The best known individual from the region is the medieval knight, Ulrich von Hutten, who was born at Steckelberg Castle.
