= Krebsbach (Haferbach) =

River in North Rhine-Westphalia, Germany

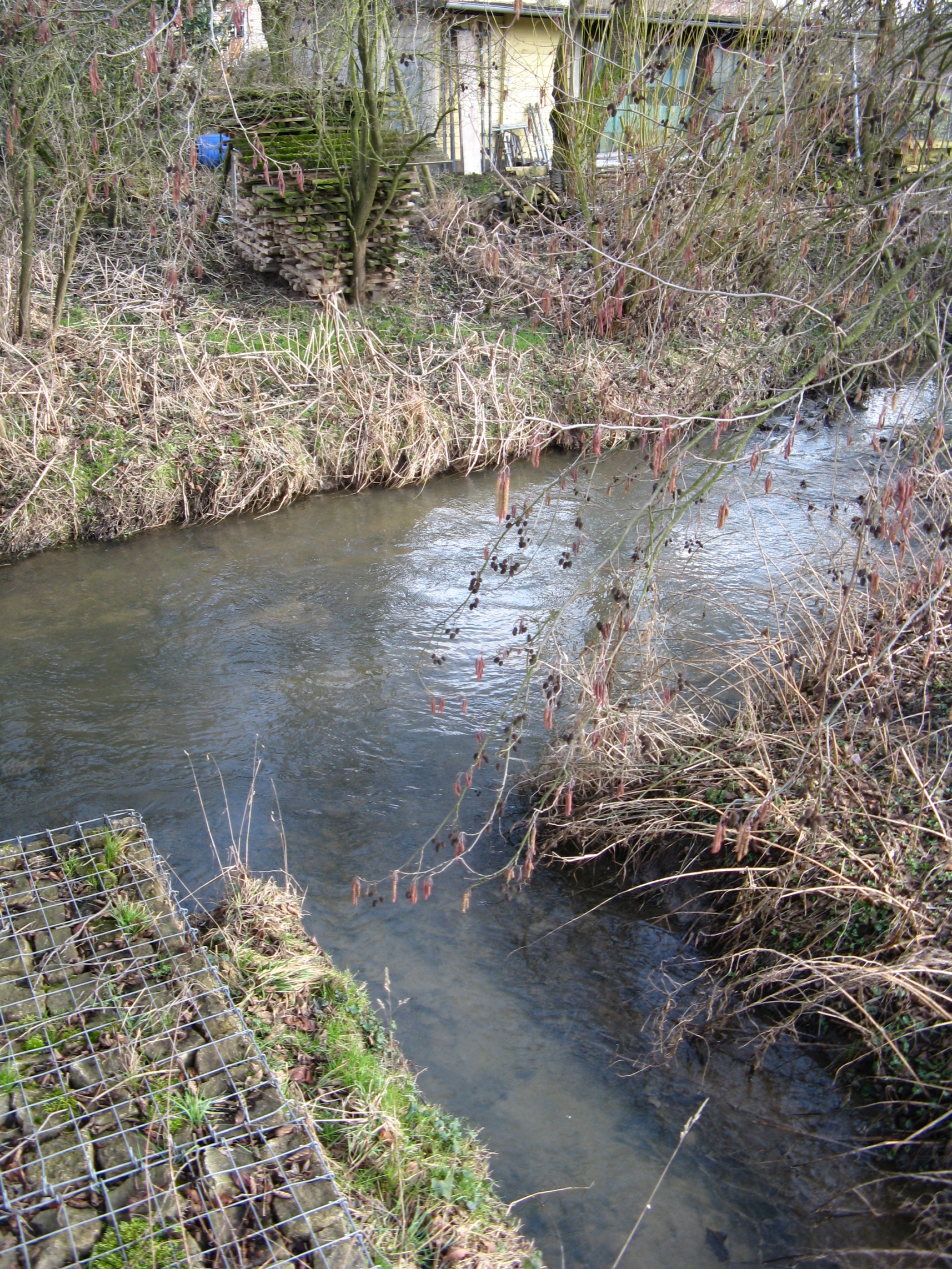

Location
- Country: Germany
- States: North Rhine-Westphalia

Physical characteristics
- Mouth
  - location: Haferbach
  - coordinates: 51.9969°N 8.7507°E

Basin features
- Progression: Haferbach→ Werre→ Weser→ North Sea

Krebsbach is a small river of North Rhine-Westphalia, Germany. It is 2 km long and is a left tributary of the Haferbach which it joins in Lippe district. It is one of ten rivers and streams in North Rhine-Westphalia named Krebsbach.

== See also ==
- List of rivers of North Rhine-Westphalia
