= Klingbach (Kinzig) =

River in Germany

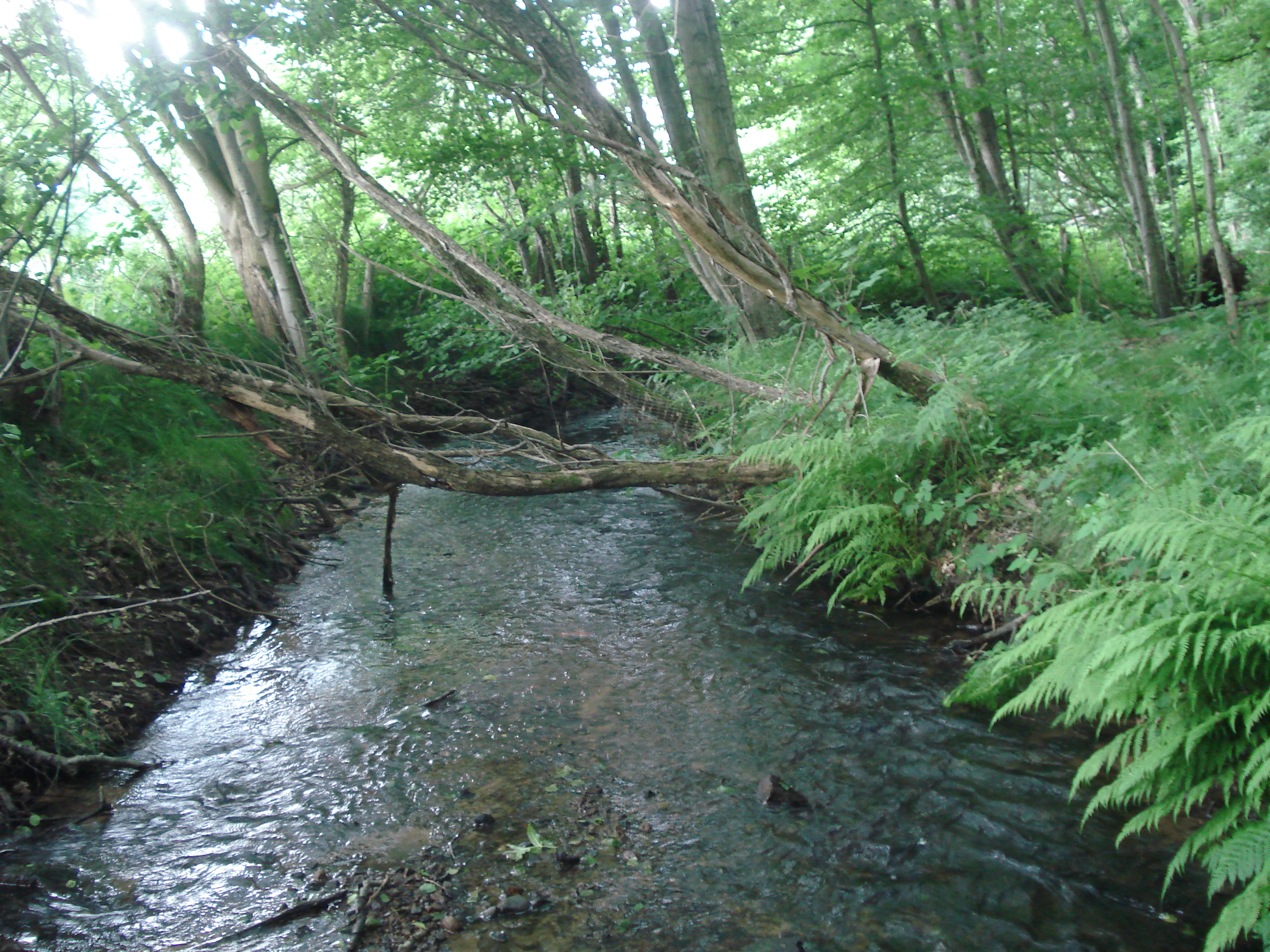

Location
- Country: Germany
- States: Hesse

Physical characteristics
- Mouth
  - location: Kinzig
  - coordinates: 50°16′30″N 9°21′33″E

Basin features
- Progression: Kinzig→ Main→ Rhine→ North Sea

Klingbach is a river of Hesse, Germany. It flows into the Kinzig in Bad Soden-Salmünster.

== See also ==
- List of rivers of Hesse
