= Salz (river) =

River in Germany

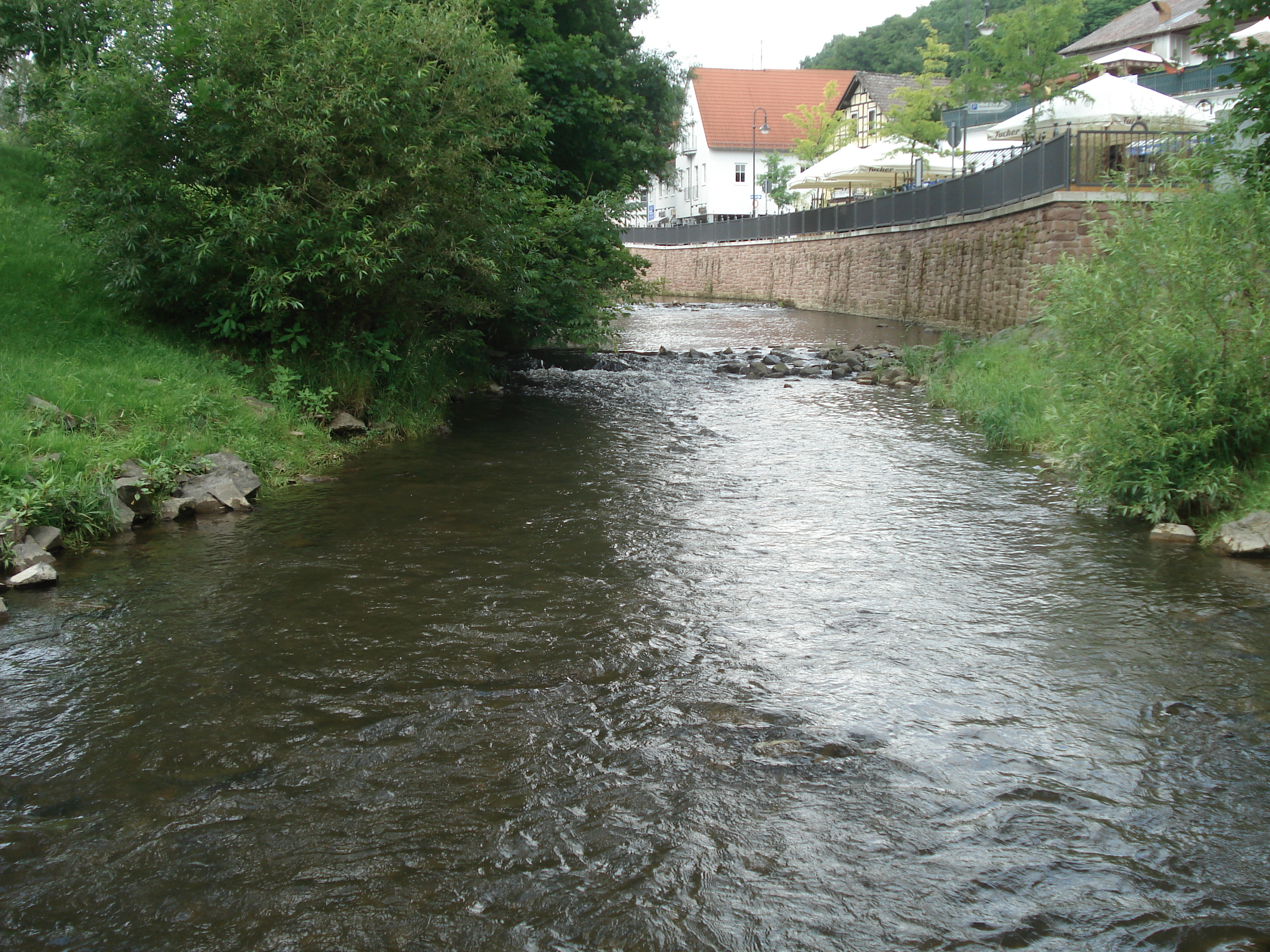

Location
- Country: Germany
- State: Hesse

Physical characteristics
- Mouth
  - location: Kinzig
  - coordinates: 50.2761°N 9.3600°E
- Length: 29.7 km (18.5 mi)

Basin features
- Progression: Kinzig→ Main→ Rhine→ North Sea

Salz (German pronunciation: [zalt]) is a river of Hesse, Germany. It flows into the Kinzig in Bad Soden-Salmünster.

== See also ==
- List of rivers of Hesse
