= Krebsbach (Paar) =

River in Germany

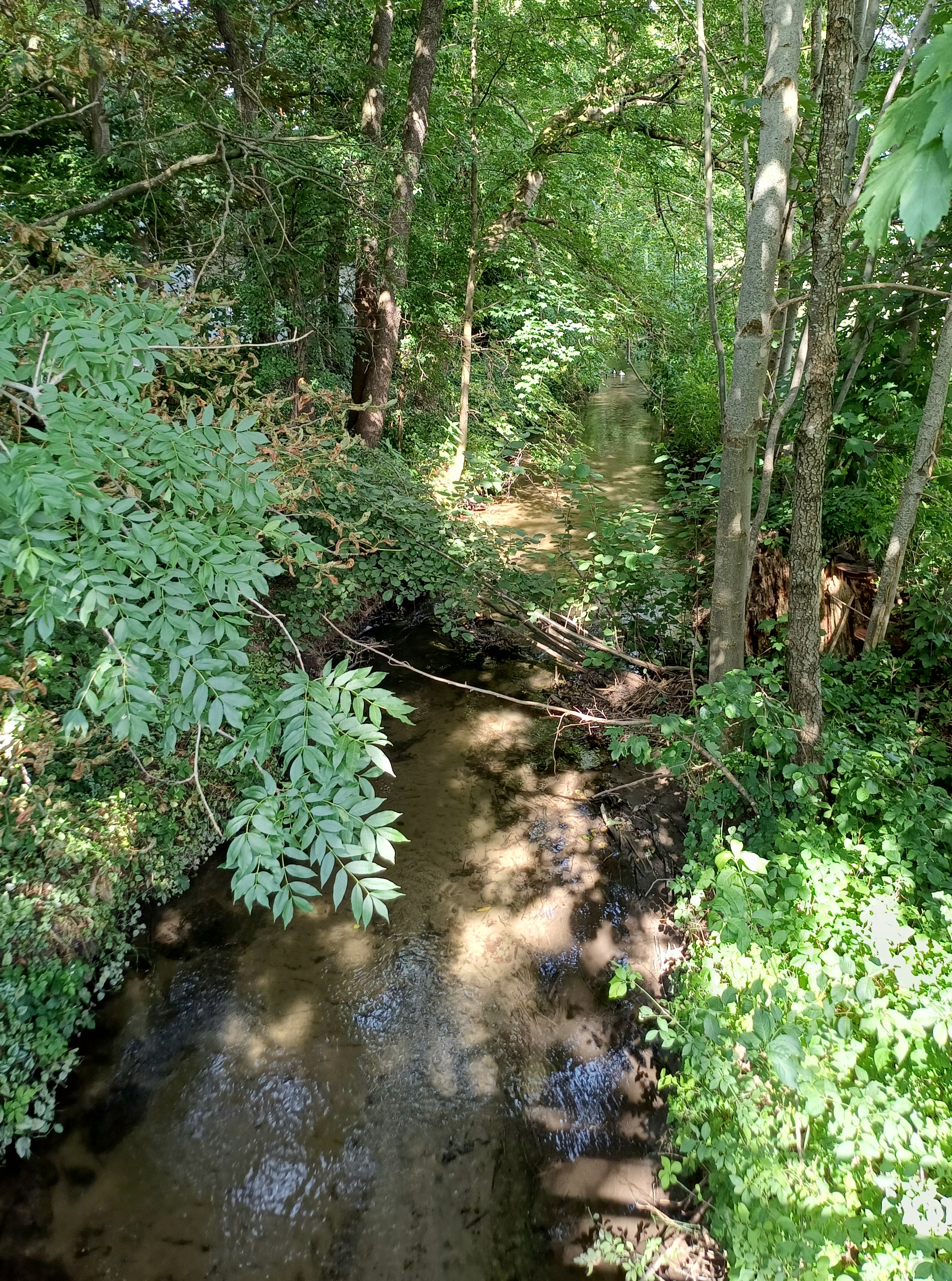
- Krebsbach in Walchshofen, a district of Aichach

Location
- Country: Germany
- State: Bavaria

Physical characteristics
- Mouth
  - location: Paar
  - coordinates: 48.4865°N 11.1424°E
- Length: 9.1 km (5.7 mi)

Basin features
- Progression: Paar→ Danube→ Black Sea

Krebsbach is a river of Bavaria, Germany. It is a left tributary of the Paar near Aichach.

== See also ==
- List of rivers of Bavaria
