= Krebsbach (Rodach) =

River in Germany

Location
- Country: Germany
- States: Bavaria

Physical characteristics
- Mouth
  - location: Rodach
  - coordinates: 50.2016°N 11.2857°E

Basin features
- Progression: Rodach→ Main→ Rhine→ North Sea

Krebsbach is a small river of Bavaria, Germany. It is a right tributary of the Rodach near Küps.

== See also ==
- List of rivers of Bavaria
