= Krebsbach (Würm) =

River in Baden-Württemberg, Germany

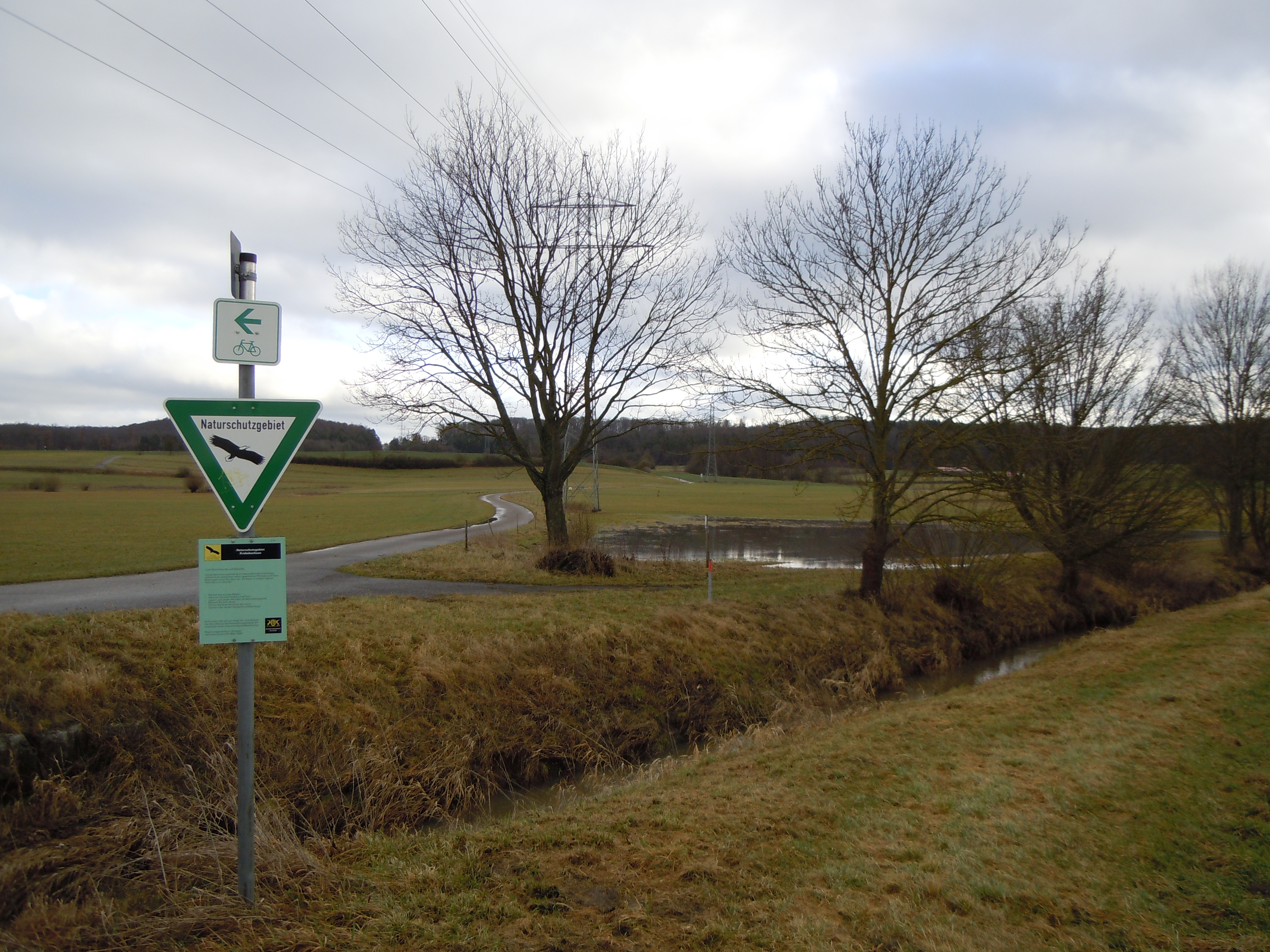

Location
- Country: Germany
- State: Baden-Württemberg

Physical characteristics
- Mouth
  - location: Würm
  - coordinates: 48°39′27″N 8°56′18″E
- Length: 12.3 km (7.6 mi)

Basin features
- Progression: Würm→ Nagold→ Enz→ Neckar→ Rhine→ North Sea

Krebsbach (in its upper course: Hungergraben) is a river which flows through the South Western state of Germany, Baden-Württemberg, Germany. It flows into the Würm in Ehningen.

== See also ==
- List of rivers of Baden-Württemberg
