= Ottendorf, Thuringia =

Ottendorf
- Municipality
- Location of Ottendorf within Saale-Holzland-Kreis district
- Interactive map of Ottendorf
- Location within Germany Location within Thuringia
- Coordinates: 50°50′N 11°49′E
- Country: Germany
- State: Thuringia
- District: Saale-Holzland-Kreis
- Municipal assoc.: Hügelland/Täler

Government
  - Mayor (2020–26): Stefan Hücker

Area
  - Total: 4.38 km^{2} (1.69 sq mi)
- Elevation: 250 m (820 ft)

Population (2025-12-31)
  - Total: 404
  - Density: 92.2/km^{2} (239/sq mi)
- Time zone: UTC+01:00 (CET)
  - Summer (DST): UTC+02:00 (CEST)
- Postal codes: 07646
- Dialling codes: 036426
- Vehicle registration: SHK, EIS, SRO
- Website: www.huegelland-taeler.de

Ottendorf (German pronunciation: [ˈɔtn̩dɔʁf]) is a municipality in the district Saale-Holzland, in Thuringia, Germany.
