= Krebsbach (Itz) =

River in Germany

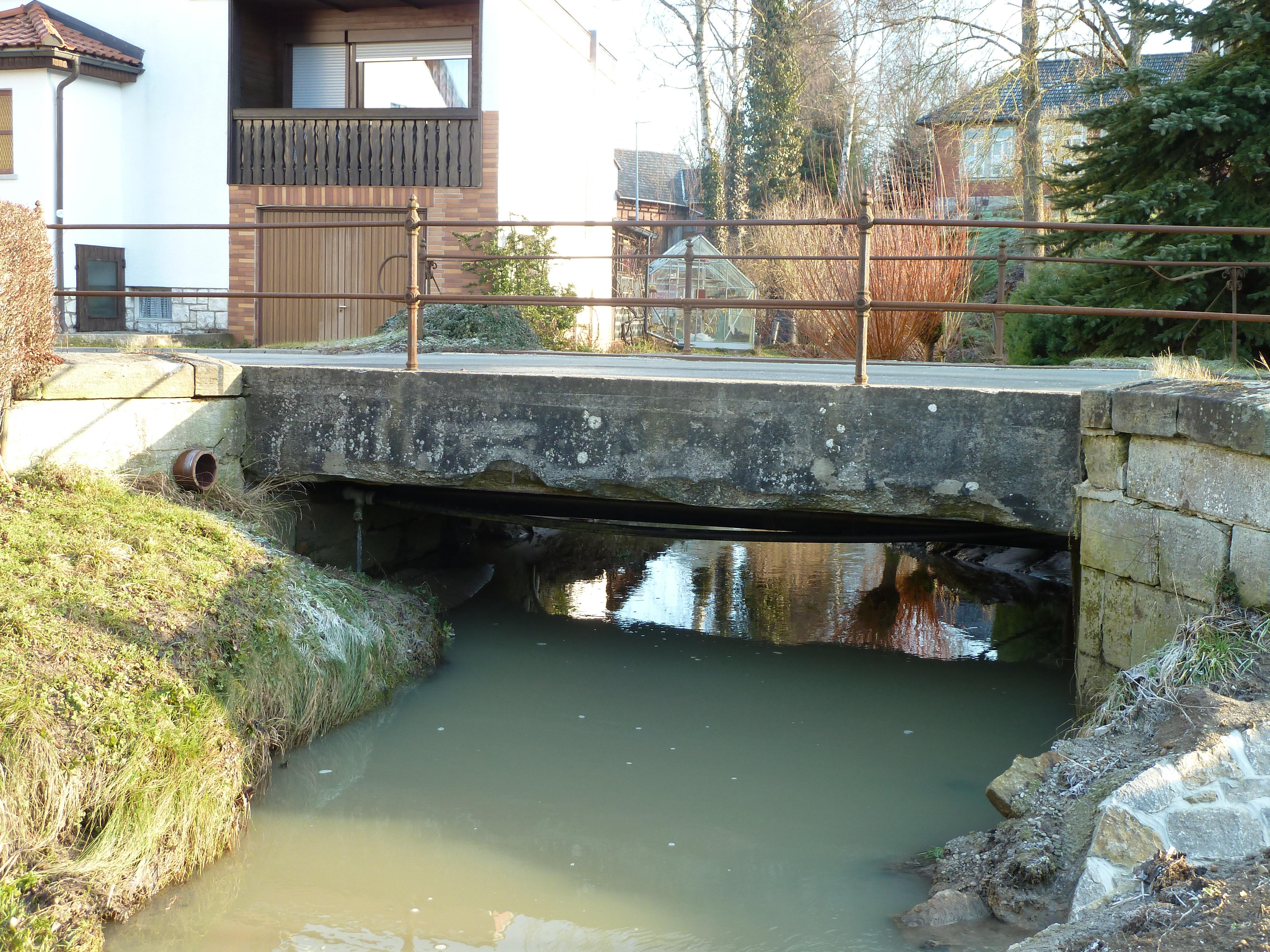
- The Krebsbach in Waldsachsen (part of Rödental)

Location
- Country: Germany
- States: Bavaria

Physical characteristics
- Mouth
  - location: Itz
  - coordinates: 50.2807°N 11.0164°E

Basin features
- Progression: Itz→ Main→ Rhine→ North Sea

Krebsbach is a river of Bavaria, Germany. It is a right tributary of the Itz near Rödental.

== See also ==
- List of rivers of Bavaria
