= Fallbach (Kinzig) =

River in Germany

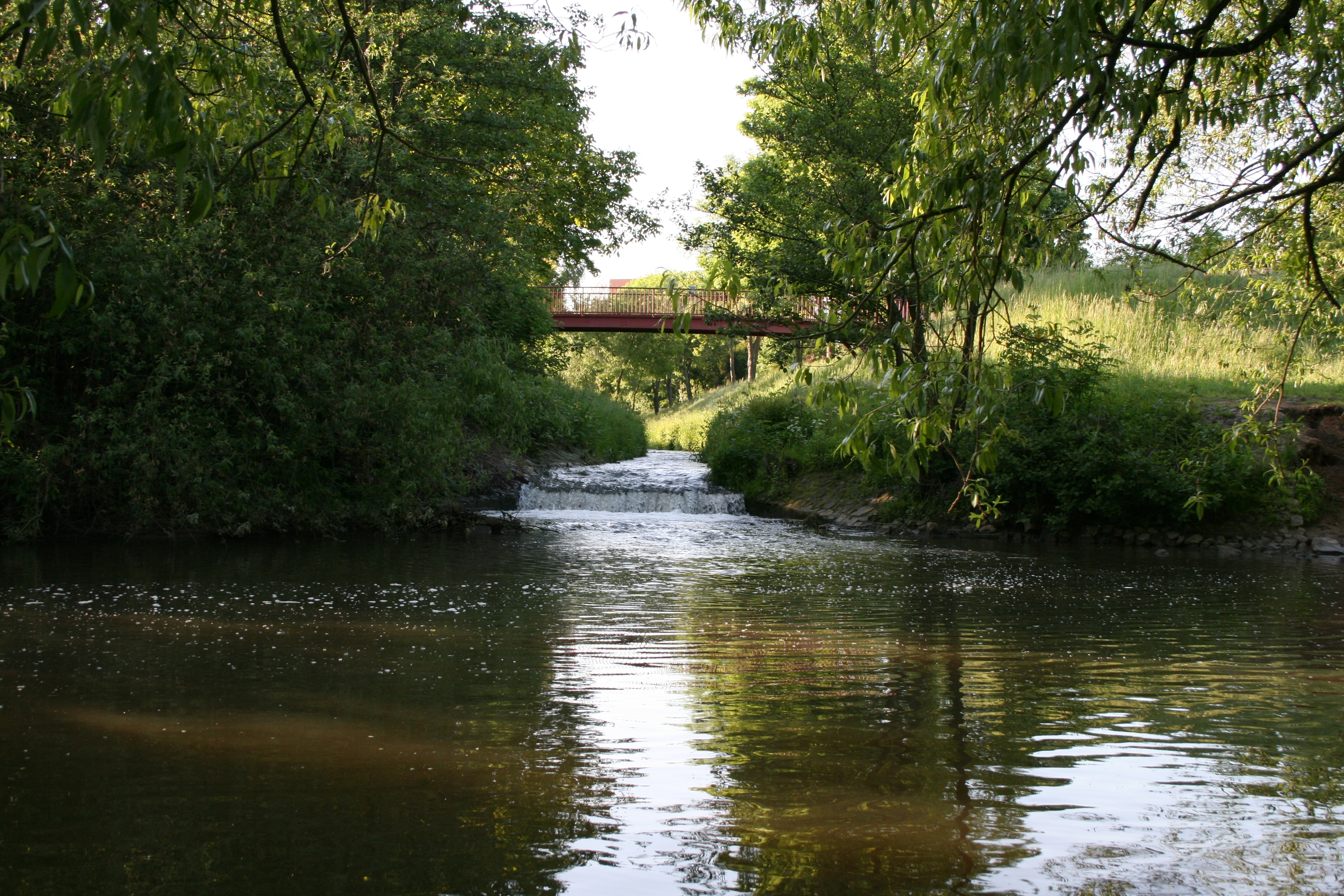
- Mouth of the Fallbach in Hanau

Location
- Country: Germany
- State: Hesse

Physical characteristics
- Source
  - location: Ronneburger hills
- Mouth
  - location: Kinzig in Hanau
  - coordinates: 50°08′30″N 8°54′56″E
- Length: 24.2 km (15.0 mi)
- Basin size: 127 km^{2} (49 sq mi)
- Discharge
  - average: 559.2 L/s (19.75 cu ft/s)

Basin features
- Progression: Kinzig→ Main→ Rhine→ North Sea

Fallbach is a river of Hesse, Germany. It flows into the Kinzig in Hanau.

== See also ==
- List of rivers of Hesse
