= Elmbach =

River in Germany

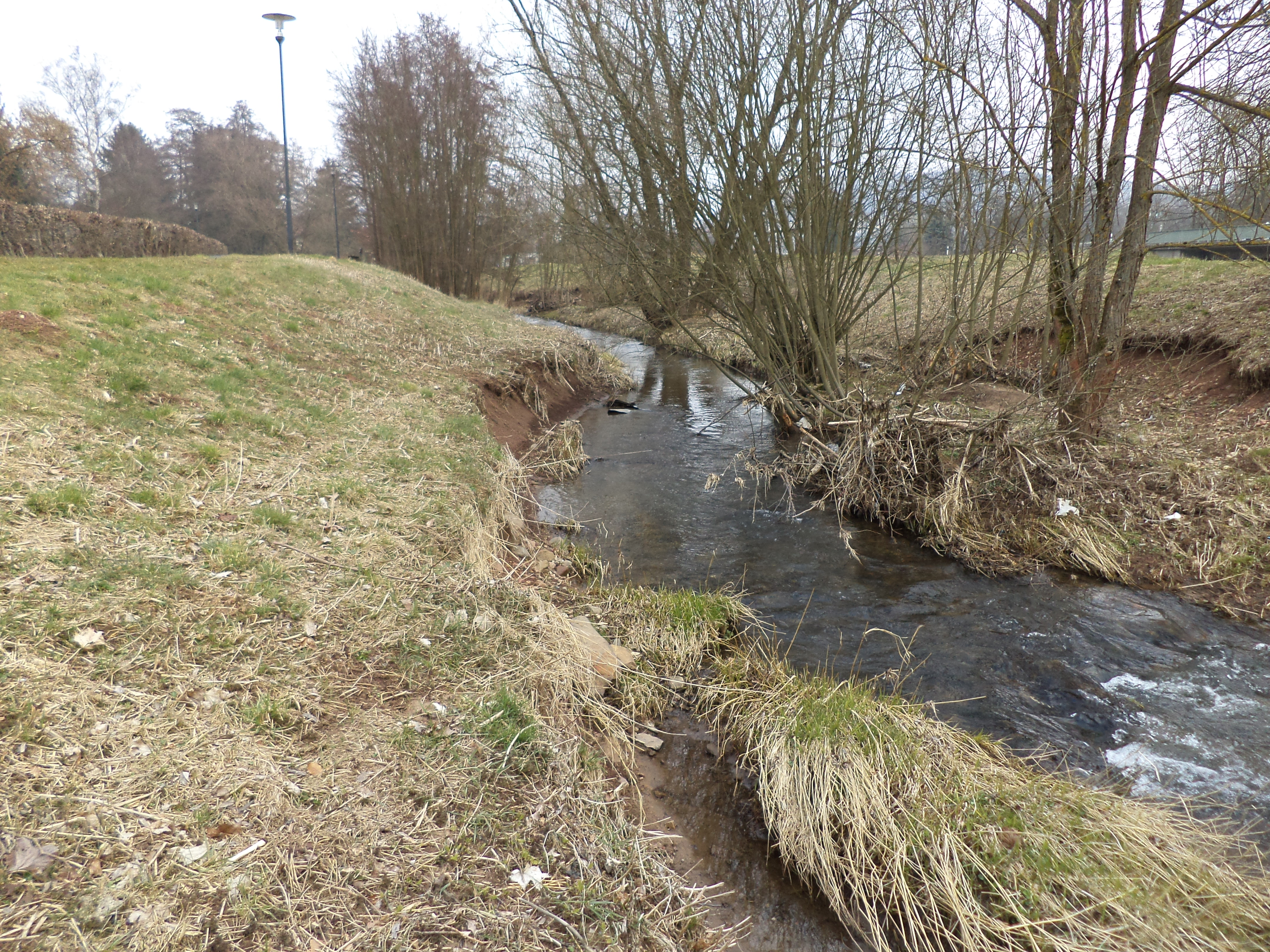

Location
- Country: Germany
- State: Hesse

Physical characteristics
- Mouth
  - location: Kinzig
  - coordinates: 50°20′44″N 9°31′48″E

Basin features
- Progression: Kinzig→ Main→ Rhine→ North Sea

Elmbach is a river of Hesse, Germany. It flows into the Kinzig in Schlüchtern.

== Tributaries ==
- Weichersbach - 1.8 km (right)
- Eckelsbach - 2.4 km (right)
- Schwarzbach - 11.5 km (left)
- (Bach aus der) Schöchterner Aue (right)

== See also ==
- List of rivers of Hesse
