= Oetternbach =

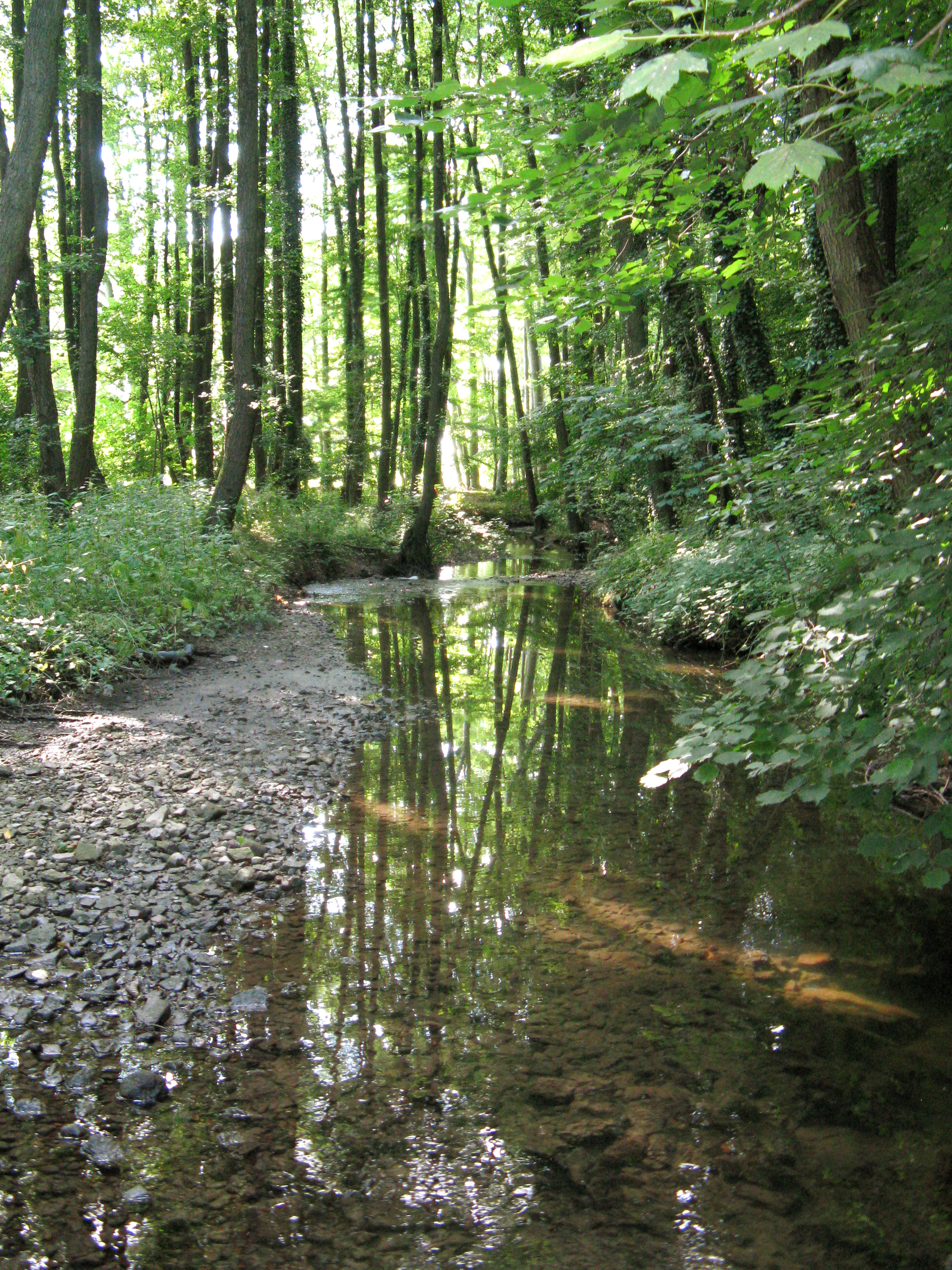

Location
- Country: Germany
- State: North Rhine-Westphalia

Physical characteristics
- Mouth
  - location: Bega
  - coordinates: 52.0240°N 8.8245°E
- Length: 16.6 km (10.3 mi)

Basin features
- Progression: Bega→ Werre→ Weser→ North Sea

Oetternbach is a river of North Rhine-Westphalia, Germany. It is a left tributary of the Bega west of Lemgo.

== See also ==
- List of rivers of North Rhine-Westphalia
