= Karlsdorf, Thuringia =

Karlsdorf
- Municipality
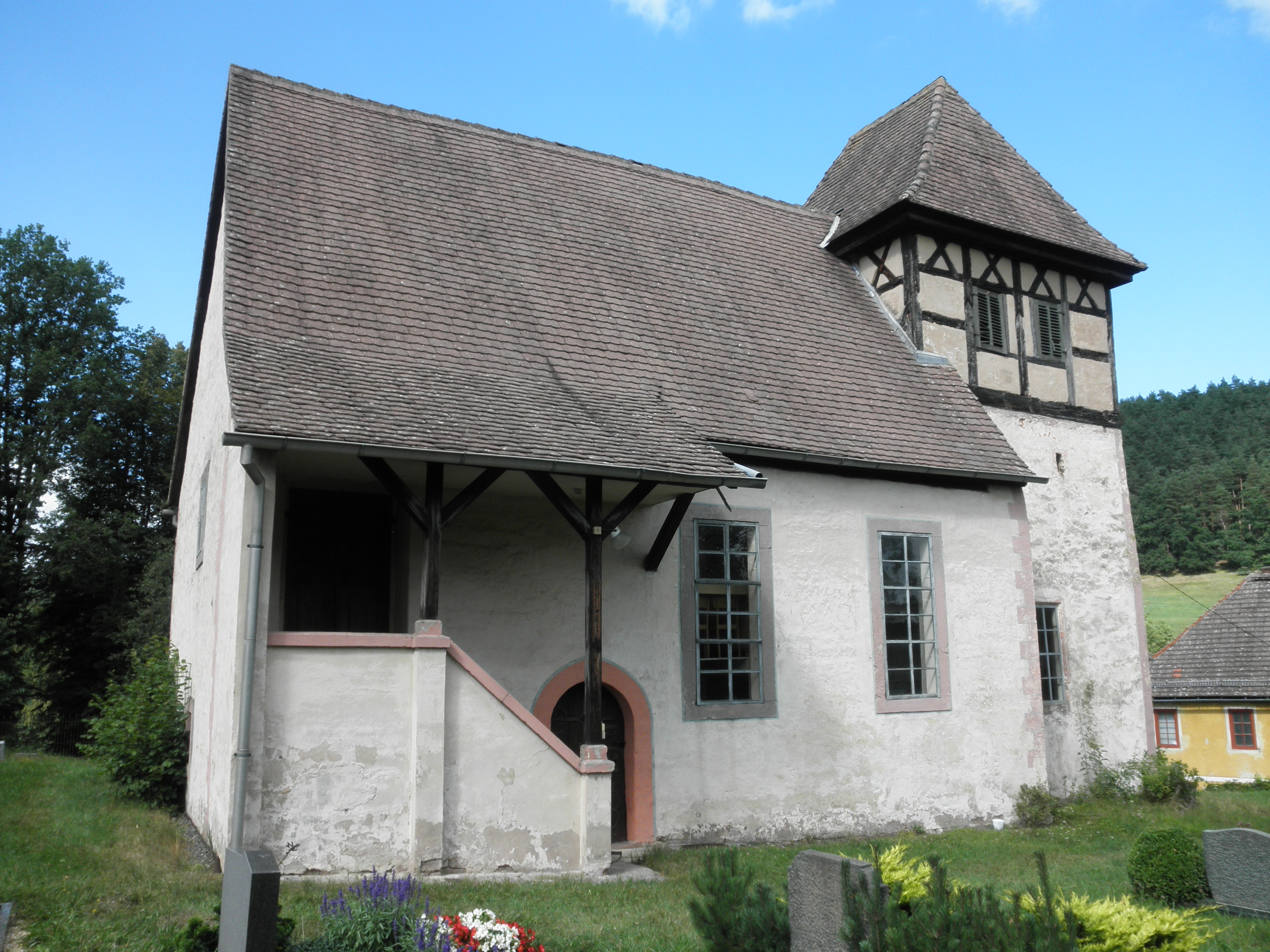
- Church in Karlsdorf

- Location of Karlsdorf within Saale-Holzland-Kreis district
- Interactive map of Karlsdorf
- Location within Germany Location within Thuringia
- Coordinates: 50°48′N 11°48′E
- Country: Germany
- State: Thuringia
- District: Saale-Holzland-Kreis
- Municipal assoc.: Hügelland/Täler

Government
  - Mayor (2022–28): Jürgen Müller

Area
  - Total: 4.68 km^{2} (1.81 sq mi)
- Elevation: 265 m (869 ft)

Population (2025-12-31)
  - Total: 115
  - Density: 24.6/km^{2} (63.6/sq mi)
- Time zone: UTC+01:00 (CET)
  - Summer (DST): UTC+02:00 (CEST)
- Postal codes: 07646
- Dialling codes: 036426
- Vehicle registration: SHK, EIS, SRO
- Website: www.huegelland-taeler.de

Karlsdorf (German pronunciation: [ˈkaʁlsdɔʁf]) is a municipality in the district Saale-Holzland in Thuringia, Germany.
