= Roda (river) =

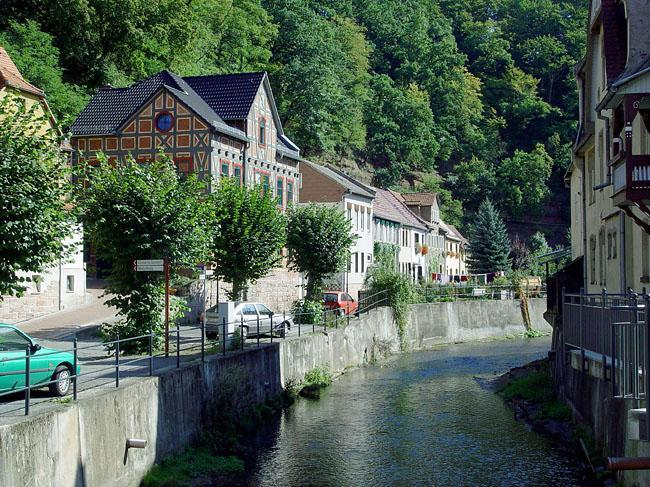

Location
- Country: Germany
- States: Thuringia

Physical characteristics
- Mouth
  - location: Saale
  - coordinates: 50.8824°N 11.5991°E

Basin features
- Progression: Saale→ Elbe→ North Sea

Roda (German pronunciation: [ˈʁoːda]) is a river of Thuringia, Germany and it flows into the Saale in Jena-Lobeda.

== See also ==
- List of rivers of Thuringia
