= Weißbach, Thuringia =

Weißbach
- Municipality
- Location of Weißbach within Saale-Holzland-Kreis district
- Interactive map of Weißbach
- Location within Germany Location within Thuringia
- Coordinates: 50°48′46″N 11°47′20″E
- Country: Germany
- State: Thuringia
- District: Saale-Holzland-Kreis
- Municipal assoc.: Hügelland/Täler

Government
  - Mayor (2022–28): Walther Kahlert

Area
  - Total: 5.29 km^{2} (2.04 sq mi)
- Elevation: 240 m (790 ft)

Population (2025-12-31)
  - Total: 128
  - Density: 24.2/km^{2} (62.7/sq mi)
- Time zone: UTC+01:00 (CET)
  - Summer (DST): UTC+02:00 (CEST)
- Postal codes: 07646
- Dialling codes: 036426
- Vehicle registration: SHK, EIS, SRO
- Website: www.huegelland-taeler.de

Weißbach (German pronunciation: [ˈvaɪsbax]) is a municipality in the district Saale-Holzland, in Thuringia, Germany. The name of the location was vouched first about 1400, according to other sources in 1072. Meat production is dominating in local business.
