= Haferbach =

River in Germany

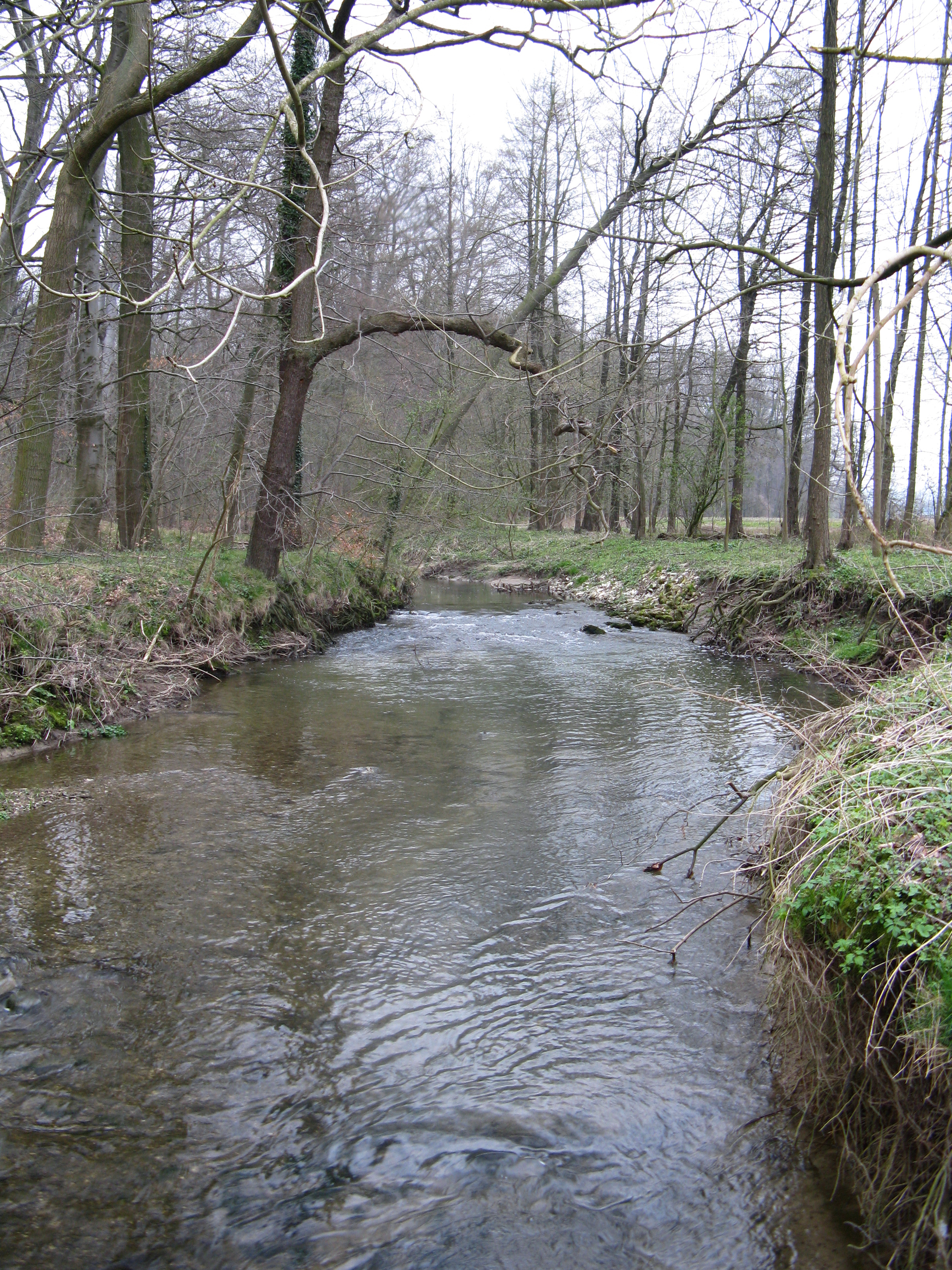

Location
- Country: Germany
- States: North Rhine-Westphalia

Physical characteristics
- Mouth
  - location: Werre
  - coordinates: 52°00′49″N 8°45′36″E

Basin features
- Progression: Werre→ Weser→ North Sea

Haferbach is a river of North Rhine-Westphalia, Germany. It rises at the foot of the Teutoburg Forest near Oerlinghausen-Wellenbruch. It flows into the Werre near Lage.

== See also ==
- List of rivers of North Rhine-Westphalia
