= Kinzig (Main) =

Right tributary of the Main in Hesse, Germany

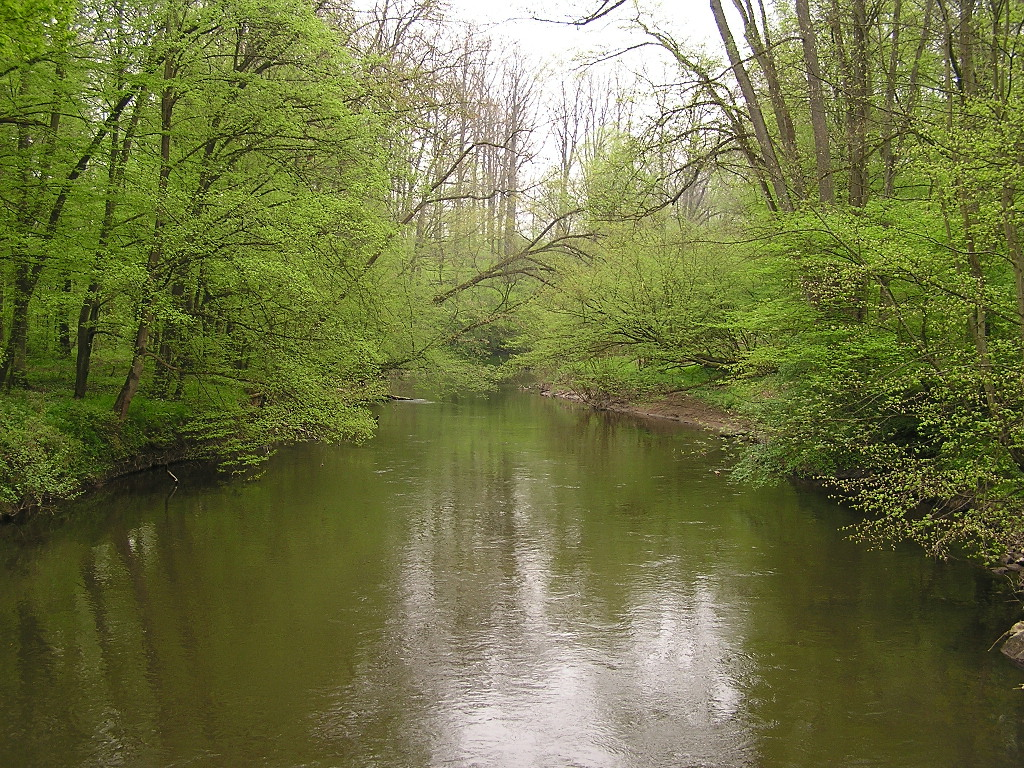
- The Kinzig in the Bulau near Hanau

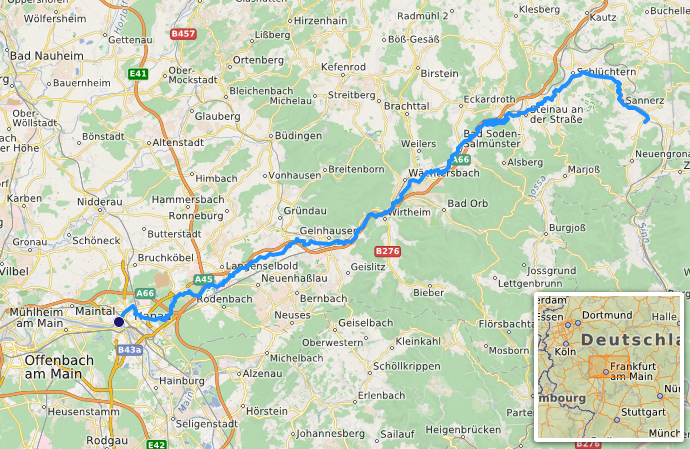
- Course of the Kinzig (interactive map)

- Location of mouth

Location
- Country: Germany
- State: Hesse
- Reference no.: DE: 2478

Physical characteristics
- Source
  - location: 500 m southwest of the village of Sinntal-Sterbfritz
  - coordinates: 50°18′13″N 9°37′11″E
  - elevation: 400 m above sea level (NN)
- Mouth
  - location: West of the Altstadt of Hanau into the Main at river kilometre 55
  - coordinates: 50°07′46″N 8°54′08″E
  - elevation: 99 m above sea level (NN)
- Length: 87.2 km (54.2 mi)
- Basin size: 1,058 km^{2} (408 sq mi)
- Discharge
  - location: at its mouth
  - average: 10.97 m³/s

Basin features
- Progression: Main→ Rhine→ North Sea
- Landmarks: Large towns: Hanau, Gelnhausen; Small towns: Schlüchtern, Steinau an der Straße, Bad Soden-Salmünster, Wächtersbach, Langenselbold
- Tributaries
  - left: Ahlersbach(2478118), Auerbach, Ahlersbach(2478152), Klingbach, Orb, Bieber, Schandelbach, Birkigsbach, Hasselbach, Lache
  - right: Ramholzer Wasser, Grennelbach, Elmbach, Riedbach, Steinaubach, Ulmbach, Salz, Bracht, Gründau, Fallbach
- Waterbodies: Reservoirs: Kinzig-Stausee
- Navigable: No (in the Middle Ages from Gelnhausen to its mouth)
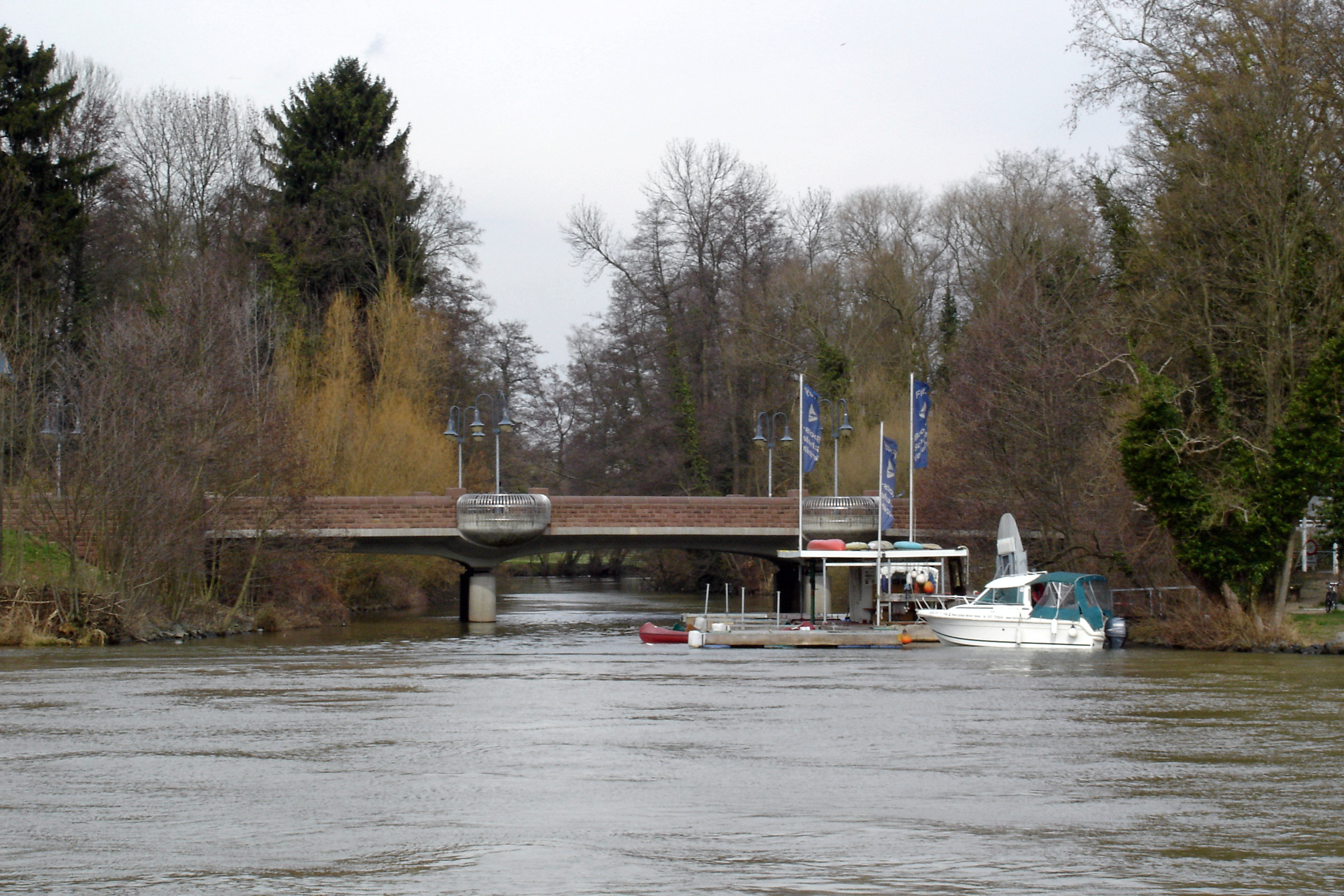
- Mouth in Hanau

The Kinzig (German pronunciation: [ˈkɪntsɪç]) is a river, 87 kilometres long, in southern Hesse, Germany. It is a right tributary of the Main. Its source is in the Spessart hills at Sterbfritz, near Schlüchtern. The Kinzig flows into the Main in Hanau. The Main-Kinzig-Kreis (district) was named after the river. The towns along the Kinzig are Schlüchtern, Steinau an der Straße, Bad Soden-Salmünster, Gelnhausen, and Hanau. The Kinzig is first recorded in 815 A.D. as Chinzicha.

This river played a part in the Battle of Hanau in October 1813, as Napoleon retreated back to the Rhine, after his defeat at the Battle of Leipzig.

== Geography ==
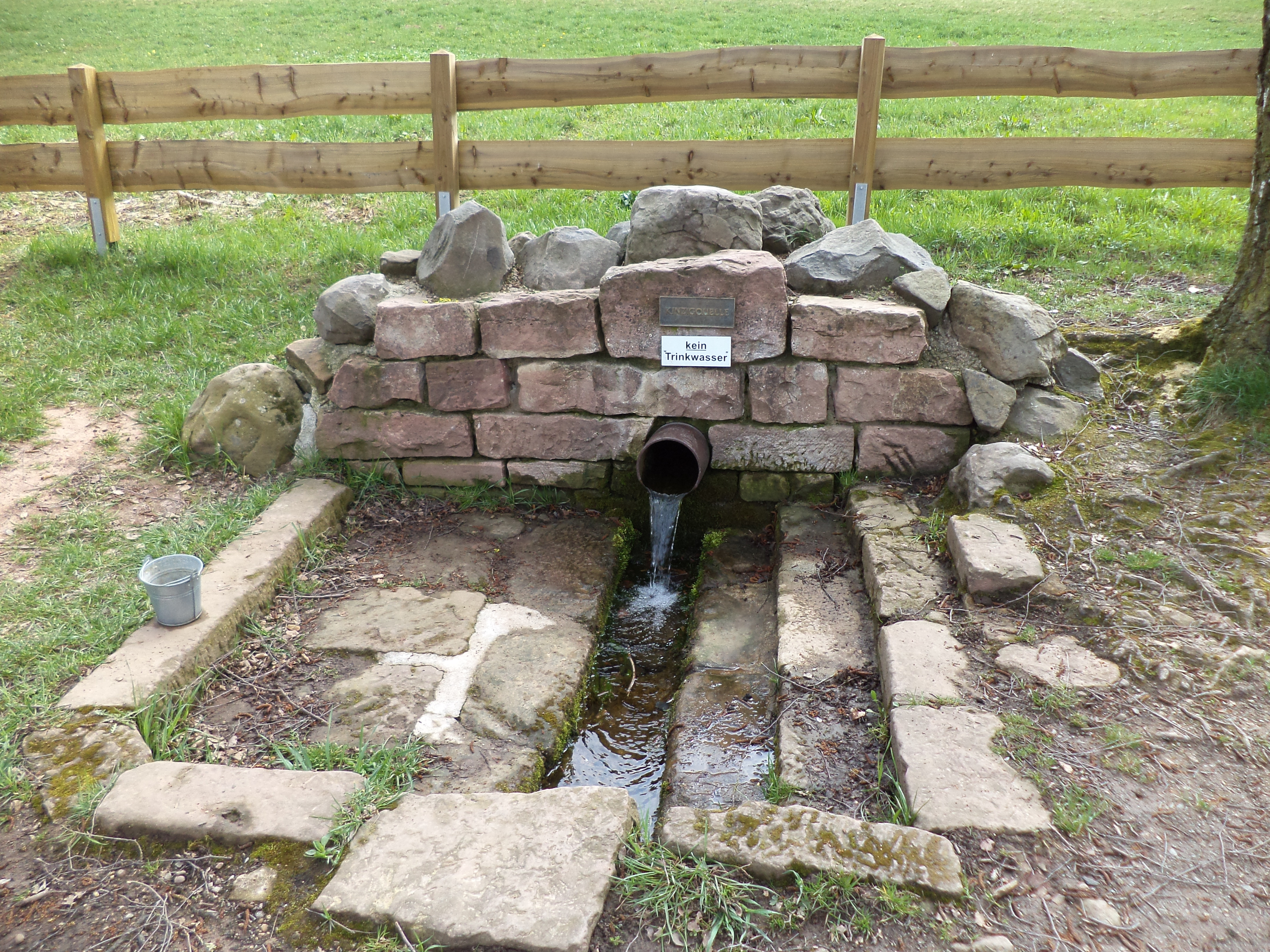
The source of the Kinzig in Sterbfritz

=== Sources ===
The source of the Kinzig (Kinzigquelle) is located at a height of about 400 m above sea level (NN), in the vicinity of an Aussiedlerhof, a recently established farmstead outside a village, south of Sterbfritz in the municipality of Sinntal. It is a small spring, enclosed in sandstone, that has an outflow pipe. The headstream that rises here flows for a few metres towards the northwest where it unites with a longer headstream.

=== Course ===
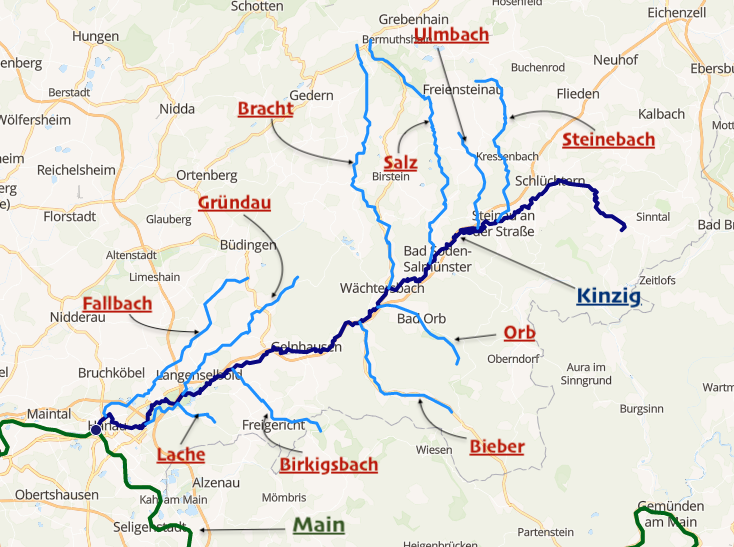
The river and its main tributaries

From its source, the Kinzig runs northwest and forms the boundary between the Hessian Rhön Nature Park and the Hessian Spessart Nature Park as far as Schlüchtern. West of Schlüchtern the Kinzig flows in a southwesterly direction and separates the Vogelsberg hills to the north from the Spessart to the south. Between Steinau and Ahl is the Kinzig Dam. In its lower reaches the Kinzig is used by canoeists. Shortly before Hanau the Kinzig flows through the so-called Bulau. This woodland area was formerly used by the US Army as an exercise area and is due to lack of population is still very natural. During high water, water flows rapidly through many ditches in the water meadows so that, in spring, extensive bear garlic meadows appear. After about 82 kilometres, the river empties into the Main in Hanau at a height of about 100 m above sea level (NN). Here, there are balcony-like views of the Philippsruhe Castle or the Main river port. The observation platform comprises two interleaved terraces linked by a steel wall.

=== Places on the Kinzig ===
(in downstream order)

- parts of Sinntal:
  - Sterbfritz (source)
  - Sannerz
- parts of Schlüchtern:
  - Vollmerz
  - Herolz
  - Schlüchtern
  - Niederzell
- Steinau an der Straße
- Ahl
- Salmünster
- parts of Wächtersbach:
  - Neudorf
  - Aufenau
  - Wächtersbach
- part of Biebergemünd
  - Wirtheim
- parts of Gelnhausen
  - Haitz
  - Gelnhausen
- parts of Gründau
  - Lieblos
  - Rothenbergen
- Langenselbold
- Erlensee
- part of Rodenbach
  - Niederrodenbach
- Hanau (mouth on the Main)

=== Tributaries ===
The Kinzig catchment covers an area of 1,058 square kilometres.

The most important tributaries (>10 km) are (in downstream order)

- the Steinebach, Ulmbach, Salz, Bracht, Orb, Bieber, Birkigsbach, Gründau, Lache and Fallbach.
