= Schlüchtern =

- Town
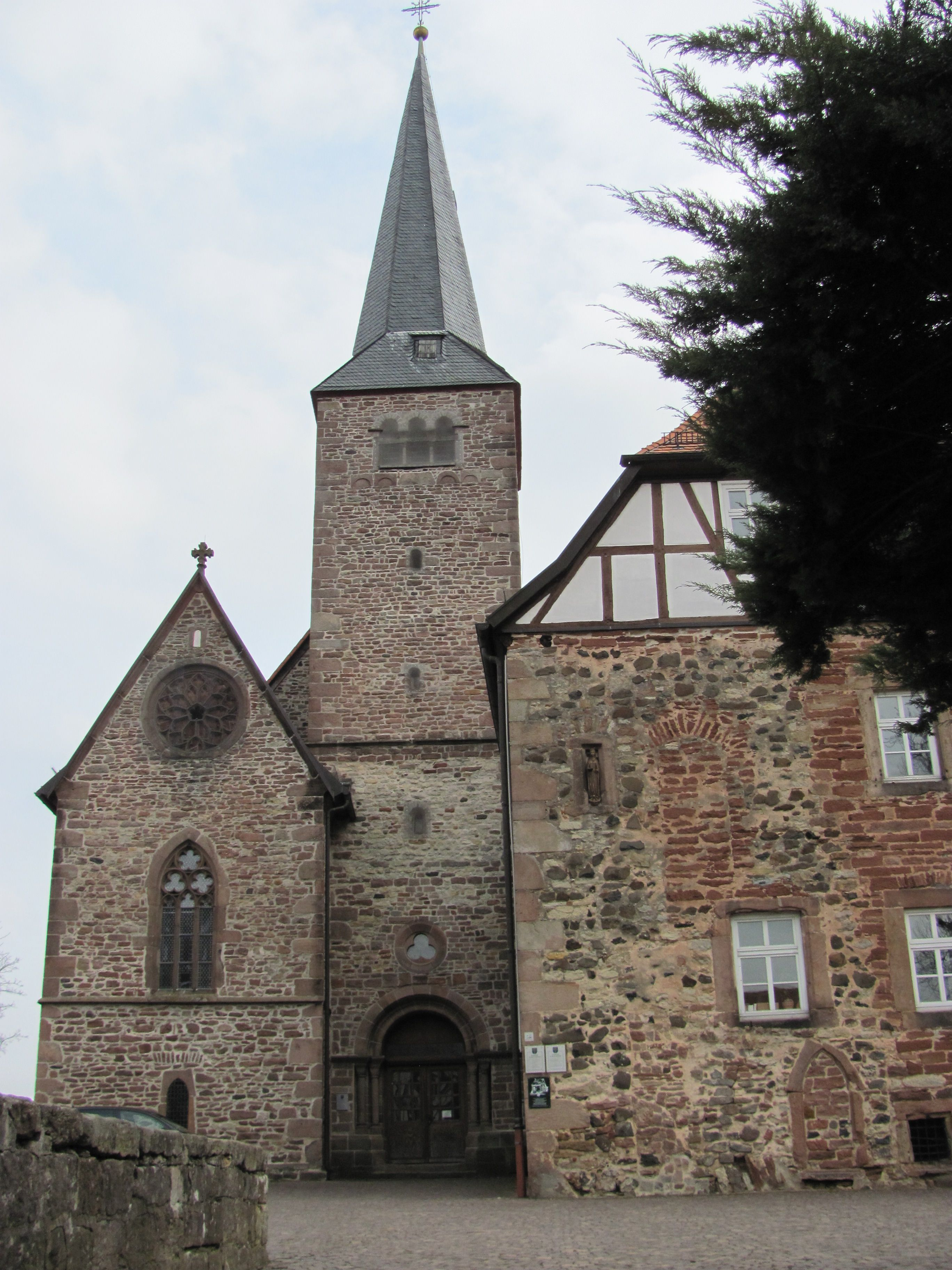
- Former Schlüchtern Abbey, west façade

- Coat of arms

- Location of Schlüchtern within Main-Kinzig-Kreis district
- Interactive map of Schlüchtern
- Location within Germany Location within Hesse
- Coordinates: 50°21′N 09°31′E
- Country: Germany
- State: Hesse
- Admin. region: Darmstadt
- District: Main-Kinzig-Kreis

Government
  - Mayor (2022–28): Matthias Möller (Ind.)

Area
  - Total: 113.30 km^{2} (43.75 sq mi)
- Elevation: 207 m (679 ft)

Population (2025-12-31)
  - Total: 15,692
  - Density: 138.50/km^{2} (358.71/sq mi)
- Time zone: UTC+01:00 (CET)
  - Summer (DST): UTC+02:00 (CEST)
- Postal codes: 36381
- Dialling codes: 06661
- Vehicle registration: MKK, GN, SLÜ
- Website: www.schluechtern.de

Schlüchtern (German pronunciation: [ˈʃlʏçtɐn]) is a town in the Main-Kinzig district, in Hessen, Germany. It is located on the river Kinzig, approximately 30 km southwest of Fulda. Schlüchtern has a population close to 16,000.

== Location ==
Schlüchtern is located in the Bergwinkel, the area between the Mittelgebirge or low mountains of the Vogelsberg, Spessart and Rhön. Also the river Kinzig flows through the municipality, in southwest area of a hill called Landrücken.

== History ==
The town itself is mentioned in a document for the first time in 1278. However, since by the mid-12th century there was a family using that name, the town is likely older than that.

The oldest documented local establishment was the Benedictine abbey of Schlüchtern. A foundation document allegedly signed by Charlemagne was discovered to be a medieval forgery. A possible first mention of the abbey dates from 819, but cannot be attributed without doubt to this location. The earliest mention that irrefutably referred to Schlüchtern Abbey dates from 993, when Otto III granted the abbey sluohderin to the Bishop of Würzburg.

The abbey became influential and by the High Middle Ages had acquired substantial land holdings far beyond the Kinzig valley. However, by the late Middle Ages its power was already waning. The Peasants' War and the Reformation accelerated its decline. The last (Protestant) abbot, Johannes Wankel, died in April 1609. Today, the abbey buildings continue to serve as a Gymnasium (school) and education facility for the regional Protestant church.

The abbey church, rebuilt in Gothic style in the 15th century, became a teachers' seminary in 1835/6. However, the crypt from Carolingian times has been preserved.

An ancient trade route, the Eselsweg connected Schlüchtern to Großheubach/Miltenberg on the river Main.

== Town partnerships ==
- Jarocin, Poland
- Fameck, France

== Infrastructure ==
=== Transport ===
Schlüchtern is connected to the Frankfurt Rhine-Main region by the A 66 and the Kinzig Valley Railway (Kinzigtalbahn) at Schlüchtern station, both connecting Frankfurt am Main and Fulda.

== Notable residents ==
- Theodore Levitt (born in Schlüchtern-Vollmerz) was an American economist and a professor at the Harvard Business School. He was editor of the Harvard Business Review, noted for increasing the Review's circulation and popularizing the term globalization. In 1983, he proposed a definition for corporate purpose: "Rather than merely making money, it is to create and keep a customer".
- Reinhold Heil (born in Schlüchtern) is a musician and film and television composer based in Los Angeles. He initially achieved success in Germany as a member of the post-punk and Neue Deutsche Welle bands Nina Hagen Band and Spliff and later as a music producer. He is known for his frequent collaborations with Australian composer Johnny Klimek and director Tom Tykwer on films such as Run Lola Run and Cloud Atlas.
