= 2017 German federal election =

- 24 September 2017

All 709 seats in the Bundestag, including 111 overhang and leveling seats 355 seats needed for a majority
- Opinion polls
- Registered: 61,688,485 (▼0.4%)
- Turnout: 76.2% (▲4.7 pp)
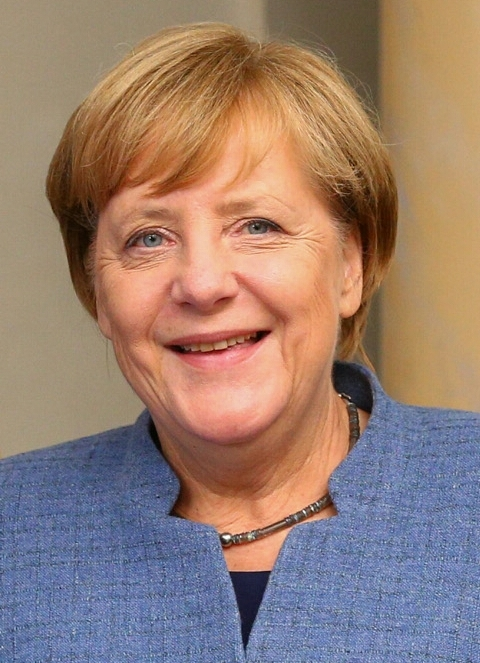

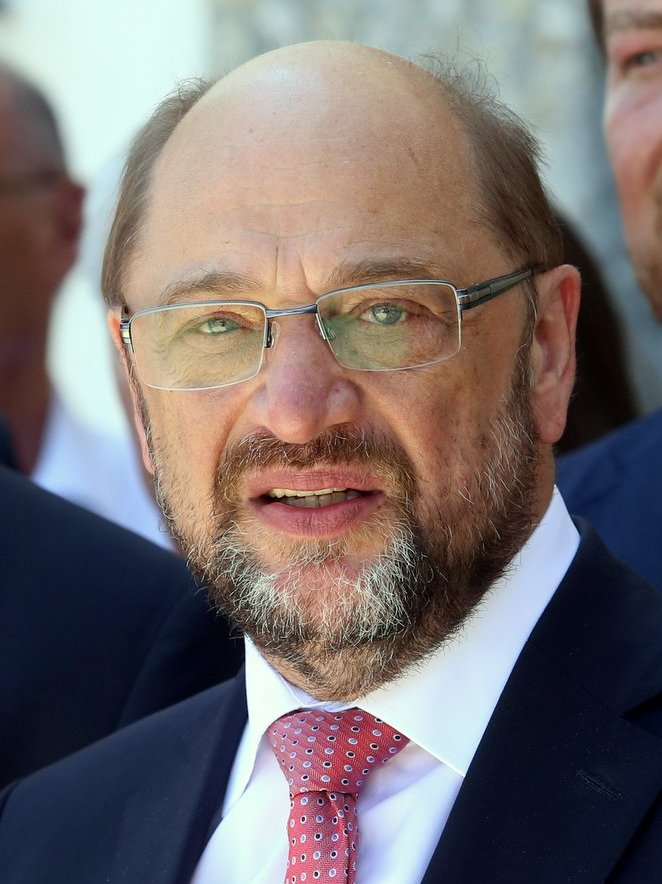

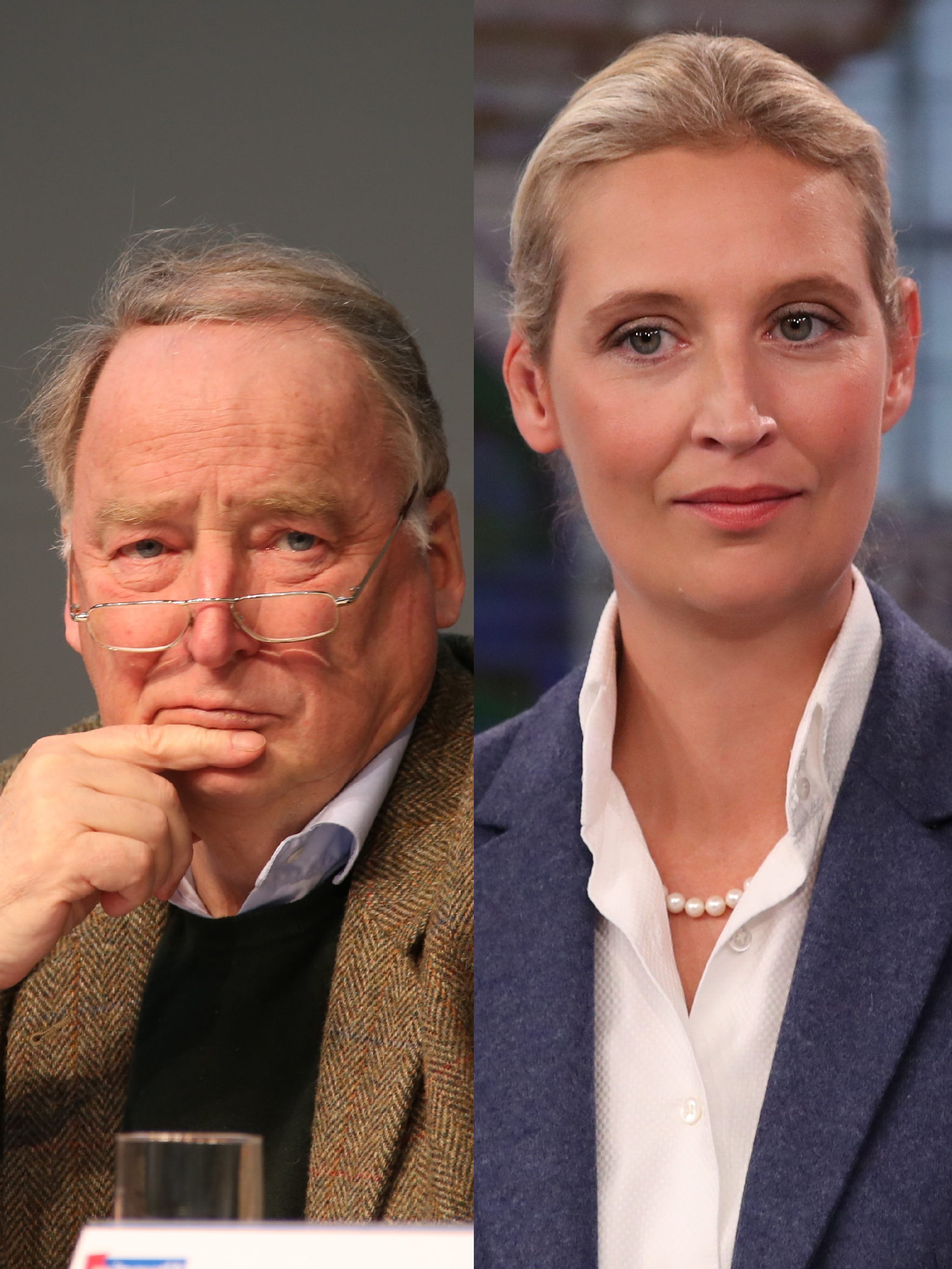

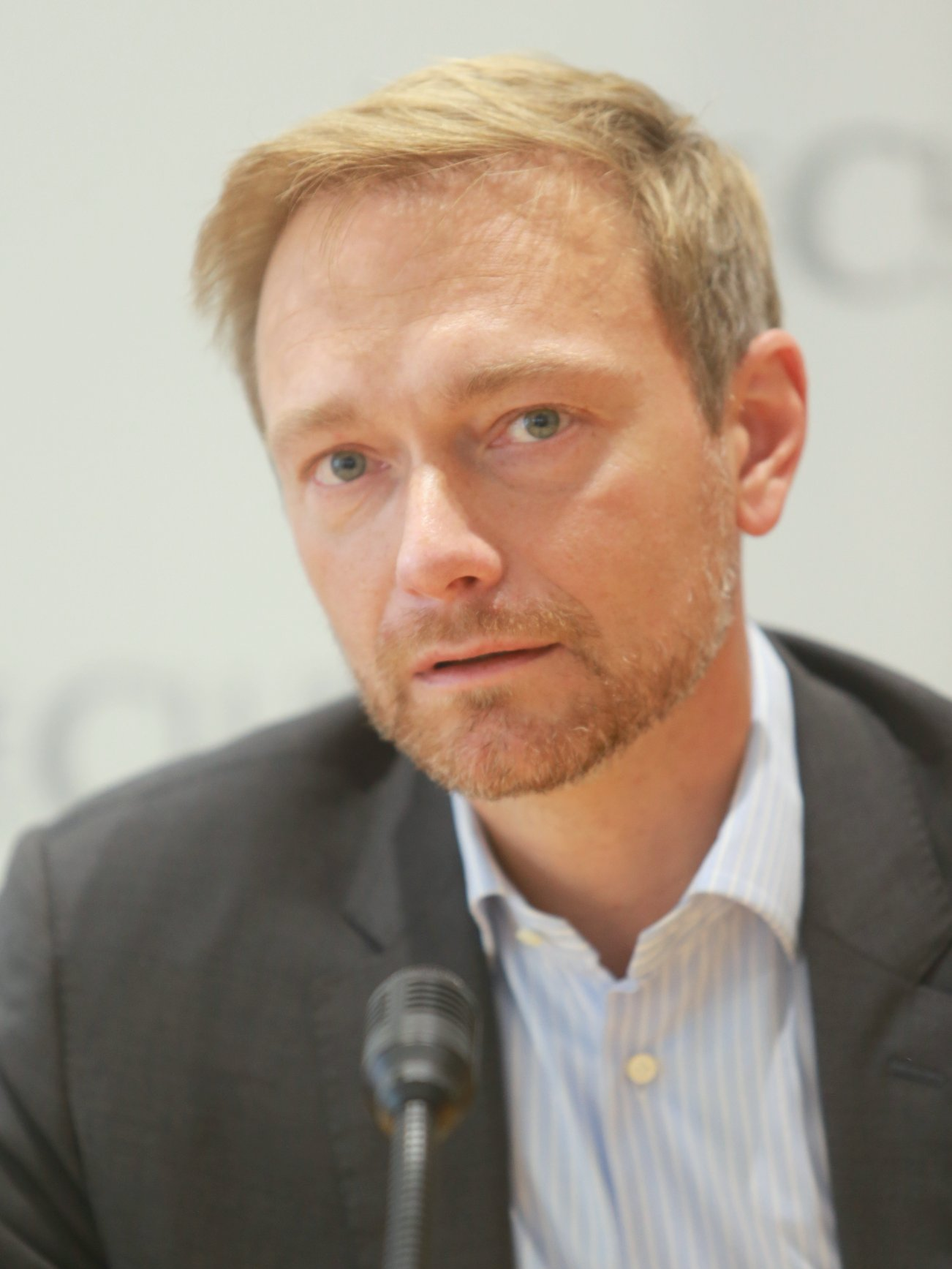

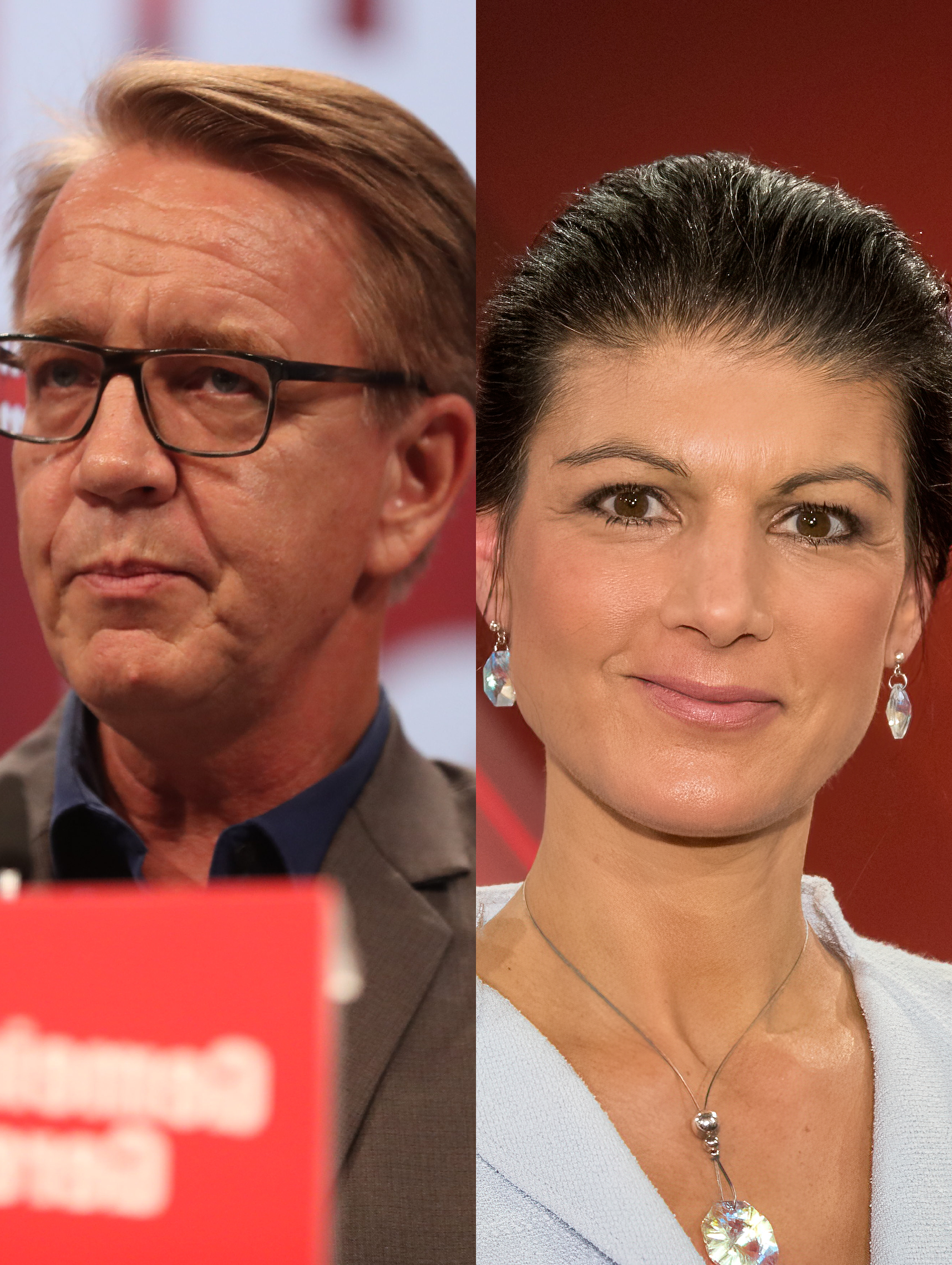

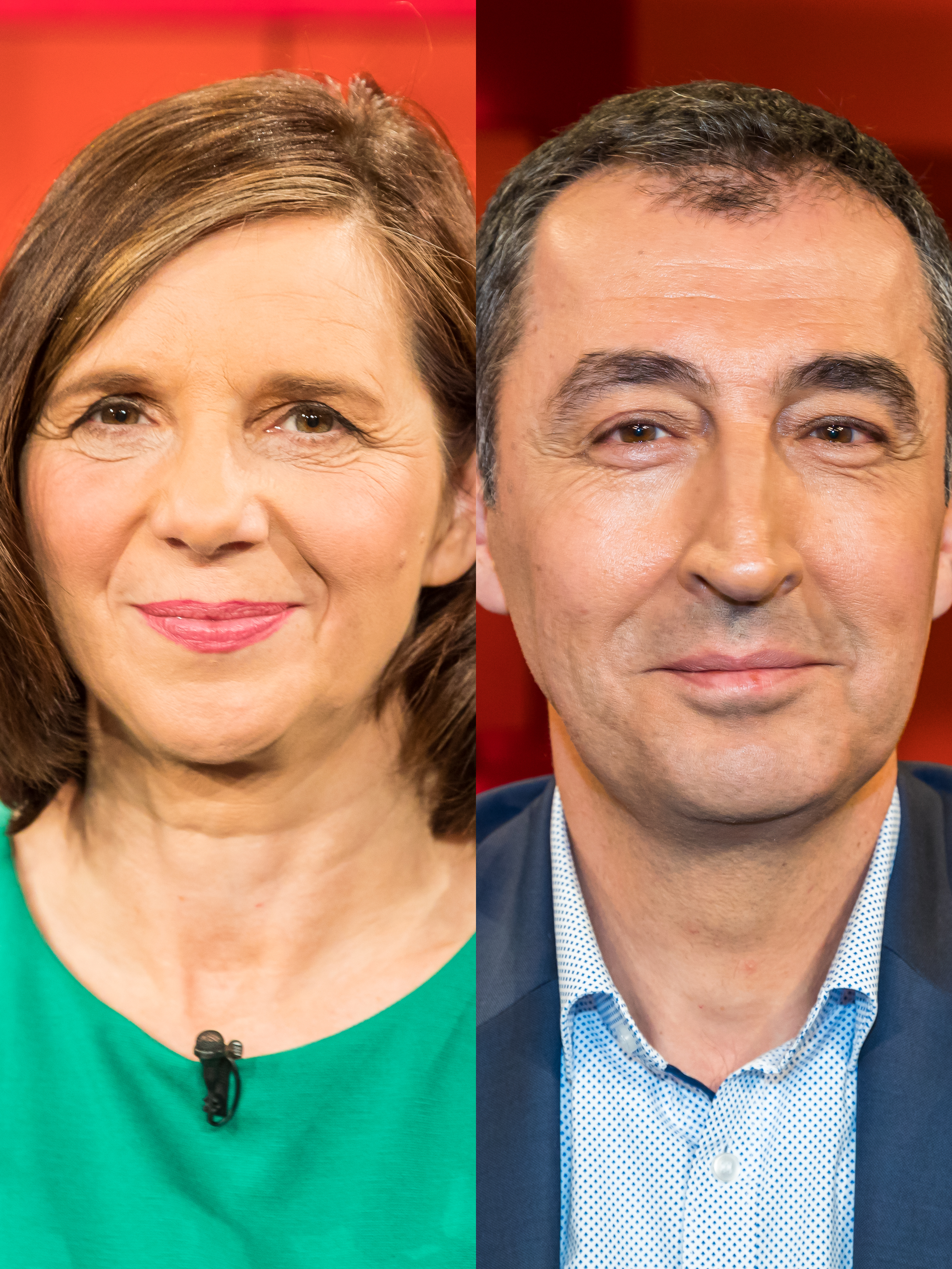
	First party	Second party	Third party
Candidate	Angela Merkel	Martin Schulz	Alexander Gauland & Alice Weidel
Party	CDU/CSU	SPD	AfD
Last election	41.5%, 311 seats	25.7%, 193 seats	4.7%, 0 seats
Seats won	246	153	94
Seat change	▼65	▼40	▲94
Popular vote	15,317,344	9,539,381	5,878,115
Percentage	32.9%	20.5%	12.6%
Swing	▼8.6 pp	▼5.2 pp	▲7.9 pp
	Fourth party	Fifth party	Sixth party
Candidate	Christian Lindner	Dietmar Bartsch & Sahra Wagenknecht	Katrin Göring-Eckardt & Cem Özdemir
Party	FDP	Left	Greens
Last election	4.8%, 0 seats	8.6%, 64 seats	8.4%, 63 seats
Seats won	80	69	67
Seat change	▲80	▲5	▲4
Popular vote	4,999,449	4,297,270	4,158,400
Percentage	10.7%	9.2%	8.9%
Swing	▲5.9 pp	▲0.6 pp	▲0.5 pp
- Results of the election. The main map shows constituency winners, and results for the proportional list seats are shown in the bottom left.
Government before election
Third Merkel cabinet
CDU/CSU–SPD
Government after election
Fourth Merkel cabinet
CDU/CSU–SPD

A federal election was held in Germany on 24 September 2017 to elect the members of the 19th Bundestag. At stake were at least 598 seats in the Bundestag, as well as 111 overhang and leveling seats determined thereafter.

The Christian Democratic Union of Germany and the Christian Social Union of Bavaria (CDU/CSU), led by incumbent chancellor Angela Merkel, won the highest percentage of the vote with 33%, though it suffered a large swing against it of more than 8%. The Social Democratic Party of Germany (SPD) achieved its second worst result since post-war Germany at 21%, undercut only by its 2025 result. Alternative for Germany (AfD), which was previously unrepresented in the Bundestag, became the third party in the Bundestag with 12.6% of the vote, whilst the Free Democratic Party (FDP) won 10.7% of the vote and returned to the Bundestag after losing all their seats in 2013. It was the first time since 1957 that a party to the political right of the CDU/CSU gained seats in the Bundestag. The other parties to achieve representation in the Bundestag were the Left and Alliance 90/The Greens, each close to 9% of the vote. In the 709 member Bundestag, a majority is 355 and the CDU/CSU won 246 seats (200 CDU and 46 CSU), the SPD 153, the AfD 94, the FDP 80, The Left 69, and the Greens 67.

For the second consecutive occasion, the CDU/CSU reached a coalition agreement with the SPD to form a grand coalition, the fourth in post-war German history, and the new government took office on 14 March 2018. The agreement came after a failed attempt by the CDU/CSU to enter into a Jamaica coalition with the Greens and the FDP, which the latter pulled out of citing irreconcilable differences between the parties on migration and energy policy. This had been by far the longest government formation in the history of the Federal Republic of Germany, as it was the first time a proposed coalition formation negotiation had collapsed and had been replaced by another coalition.

== Background ==
At the 2013 German federal election, the incumbent government composed of the Christian Democratic Union of Germany (CDU), the Christian Social Union of Bavaria (CSU), and the Free Democratic Party (FDP) had failed to maintain a majority of seats. The FDP failed to get over 5% of the vote in 2013, denying the party seats in the Bundestag for the first time in its history. In contrast, the CDU/CSU obtained their best result since 1990, with nearly 42% of the vote and just 5 seats short of an absolute majority. The CDU/CSU then successfully negotiated with the Social Democratic Party of Germany (SPD) to form a grand coalition for the third time.

In January 2017, party leader Sigmar Gabriel recommended Martin Schulz, the former president of the European Parliament, as their leader and chancellor candidate. (Note: Schulz was formally nominated in March.) The party substantially increased its support as a result; however, the CDU afterward regained its lead, with polls generally showing a 13–16% lead over the SPD.

== Date ==
German law requires that a new Bundestag shall be elected on a Sunday or on a nationwide holiday between 46 and 48 months after the last Bundestag's first sitting (Basic Law Article 39 Section 1). In January 2017, then-President Joachim Gauck scheduled the election for 24 September 2017.

After the election, the 19th Bundestag had to hold its first sitting within 30 days. Until that first sitting, the members of the 18th Bundestag remained in office (Basic Law Article 39 Section 1 and 2).

== Electoral system ==
Germany uses the mixed-member proportional representation system, a system of proportional representation combined with elements of first-past-the-post voting. The Bundestag has 598 nominal members, elected for a four-year term; these seats are distributed between the sixteen German states in proportion to the states' population eligible to vote.

Every elector has two votes: a constituency and a list vote. 299 members are elected in single-member constituencies by first-past-the-post, based just on the first votes. The second votes are used to produce an overall proportional result in the states and then in the Bundestag. Seats are allocated using the Sainte-Laguë method. If a party wins fewer constituency seats in a state than its second votes would entitle it to, it receives additional seats from the relevant state list. Parties can file lists in each single state under certain conditions, such as a fixed number of supporting signatures. Parties can receive second votes only in those states in which they have successfully filed a state list.

If a party by winning single-member constituencies in one state receives more seats than it would be entitled to according to its second vote share in that state (overhang seats), the other parties receive compensation seats. Owing to this provision, the Bundestag usually has more than 598 members. The 18th Bundestag, for example, started with 631 seats: 598 regular and 33 overhang and compensation seats. Overhang seats are calculated at the state level, so many more seats are added to balance this out among the different states, adding more seats than would be needed to compensate for overhang at the national level in order to avoid negative vote weight.

In order to qualify for seats based on the party-list vote share, a party must either win three single-member constituencies or exceed a threshold of 5% of the second votes nationwide. If a party only wins one or two single-member constituencies and fails to get at least 5% of the second votes, it keeps the single-member seat(s), but other parties that accomplish at least one of the two threshold conditions receive compensation seats. During the 2002 German federal election, the PDS won only 4.0% of the party-list votes nationwide but won two constituencies in the state of Berlin. The same applies if an independent candidate wins a single-member constituency, which has not happened since 1949. In the 2013 German federal election, the FDP only won 4.8% of party-list votes; this cost it all of its seats in the Bundestag.

If a voter has cast a first vote for a successful independent candidate or a successful candidate whose party failed to qualify for proportional representation, their second vote does not count to determine proportional representation; however, it does count to determine whether the elected party has exceeded the five percent hurdle.

Parties representing recognized national minorities, such as Danes, Frisians, Sorbs, and Romani people, are exempt from the 5% threshold but normally only run in state elections.

== Parties and leaders ==
Altogether 38 parties have managed to get on the ballot in at least one state and can therefore (theoretically) earn proportional representation in the Bundestag. Furthermore, there are several independent candidates, running for a single-member constituency. Below are the major parties that are likely to either exceed the threshold of 5% second votes or to win single-member constituencies (first votes).

Name			Ideology	Leading candidate(s)	2013 result	
Name			Ideology	Leading candidate(s)	Votes (%) (Note: Second votes (party list))	Seats
CDU/CSU	CDU	Christian Democratic Union of Germany; Christlich Demokratische Union Deutschlands	Christian democracy	Angela Merkel	34.1%	311 / 631
CDU/CSU	CSU	Christian Social Union in Bavaria; Christlich-Soziale Union in Bayern	Christian democracy	Angela Merkel	7.4%	311 / 631
SPD		Social Democratic Party of Germany; Sozialdemokratische Partei Deutschlands	Social democracy	Martin Schulz	25.7%	193 / 631
Linke		The Left; Die Linke	Democratic socialism	Dietmar Bartsch; Sahra Wagenknecht	8.6%	64 / 631
Grüne		Alliance 90/The Greens; Bündnis 90/Die Grünen	Green politics	Cem Özdemir; Katrin Göring-Eckardt	8.4%	63 / 631
FDP		Free Democratic Party; Freie Demokratische Partei	Liberalism	Christian Lindner	4.8%	0 / 631
AfD		Alternative for Germany; Alternative für Deutschland	National conservatism Völkisch nationalism	Alexander Gauland; Alice Weidel	4.7%	0 / 631

Traditionally, the Christian Democratic Union of Germany (CDU) and the Christian Social Union in Bavaria (CSU), which refer to each other as sister parties, do not compete against each other. The CSU only contests elections in Bavaria, while the CDU contests elections in the other fifteen states. Although these parties have some differences, such as the CSU's opposition to the previous government's immigration policies, the CDU and CSU share the same basic political aims and are allowed by the Regulations of the Bundestag to join into one parliamentary Fraktion (a parliamentary group composed of at least 5% of the members of the Bundestag, entitled to specific rights in parliament) after the elections, as they do in the form of the CDU/CSU group.

As the CDU/CSU and the Social Democratic Party of Germany (SPD) were likely to win the most seats in the election, their leading candidates are referred to as chancellor candidates; however, this does not mean that the new Bundestag is legally bound to elect one of them as chancellor.

== Opinion polling ==
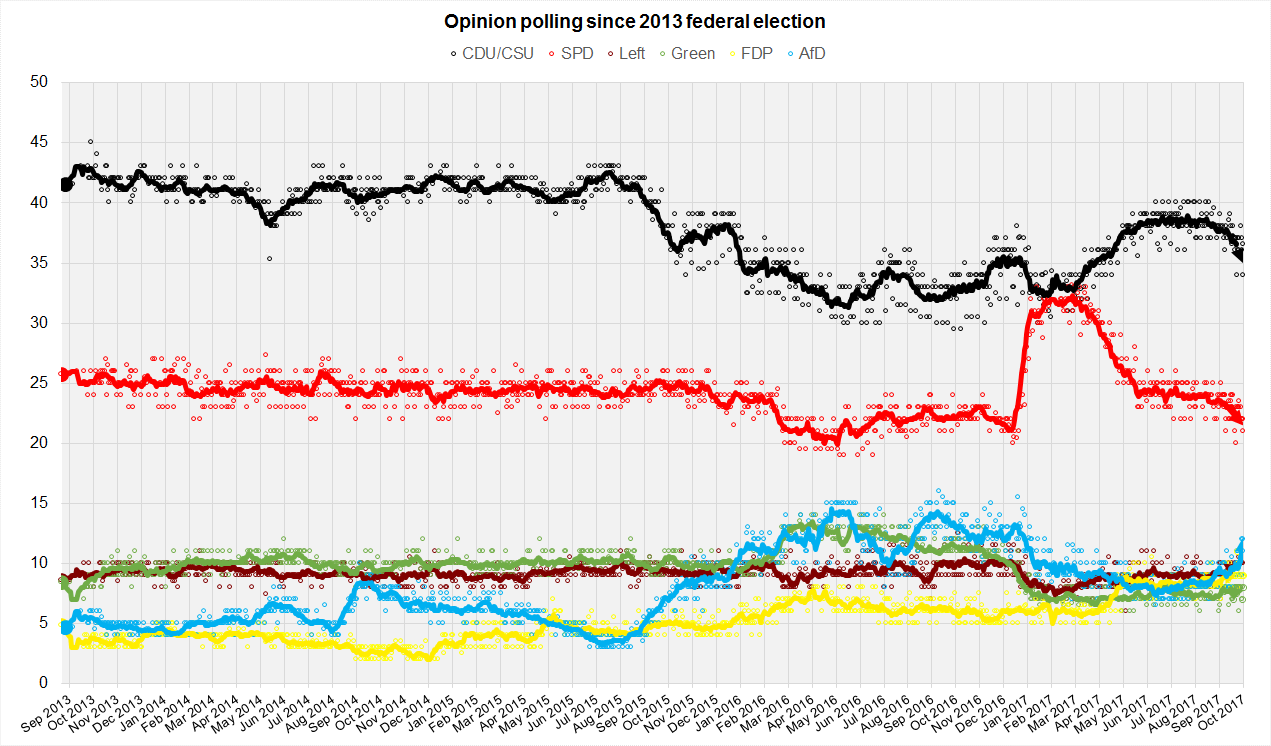
The polls are from September 2013 (the last federal election) up to the current date. Each coloured line specifies a political party.

== Results ==
Constituencies won

Results of the second vote by state

Additional member seats by state

The CDU/CSU and the SPD remained the two largest parties in the Bundestag, but both received a significantly lower proportion of the vote than they did in the 2013 German federal election.

The AfD received enough votes to enter the Bundestag for the first time, taking 12.6 percent of the vote—more than double the five percent threshold required to qualify for full parliamentary status. It also won three constituency seats, which would have qualified it for proportionally-elected seats in any event.

The FDP returned to the Bundestag with 10.7 percent of the vote. Despite improving their results slightly and thus gaining a few more seats, the Left and the Greens remained the two smallest parties in parliament.

Party	Party-list			Constituency			Total seats	+/–
Party	Votes	%	Seats	Votes	%	Seats	Total seats	+/–
Christian Democratic Union	12,447,656	26.76	15	14,030,751	30.25	185	200	−65
Social Democratic Party	9,539,381	20.51	94	11,429,231	24.64	59	153	−40
Alternative for Germany	5,878,115	12.64	91	5,317,499	11.46	3	94	+94
Free Democratic Party	4,999,449	10.75	80	3,249,238	7.00	0	80	+80
The Left	4,297,270	9.24	64	3,966,637	8.55	5	69	+5
Alliance 90/The Greens	4,158,400	8.94	66	3,717,922	8.01	1	67	+4
Christian Social Union	2,869,688	6.17	0	3,255,487	7.02	46	46	−10
Free Voters	463,292	1.00	0	589,056	1.27	0	0	0
Die PARTEI	454,349	0.98	0	245,659	0.53	0	0	0
Human Environment Animal Protection Party	374,179	0.80	0	22,917	0.05	0	0	0
National Democratic Party	176,020	0.38	0	45,169	0.10	0	0	0
Pirate Party Germany	173,476	0.37	0	93,196	0.20	0	0	0
Ecological Democratic Party	144,809	0.31	0	166,228	0.36	0	0	0
Basic Income Alliance	97,539	0.21	0				0	New
V-Partei3	64,073	0.14	0	1,201	0.00	0	0	New
German Centre	63,203	0.14	0				0	New
Democracy in Motion	60,914	0.13	0				0	New
Bavaria Party	58,037	0.12	0	62,622	0.13	0	0	0
Alliance of German Democrats	41,251	0.09	0				0	New
Alliance for Human Rights, Animal and Nature Protection	32,221	0.07	0	6,114	0.01	0	0	New
Marxist–Leninist Party	29,785	0.06	0	35,760	0.08	0	0	0
Partei für Gesundheitsforschung	23,404	0.05	0	1,537	0.00	0	0	New
Menschliche Welt	11,661	0.03	0	2,205	0.00	0	0	New
German Communist Party	11,558	0.02	0	7,517	0.02	0	0	0
The Grays – For All Generations	10,009	0.02	0	4,300	0.01	0	0	New
From now... Democracy by Referendum	9,631	0.02	0	6,316	0.01	0	0	0
Bürgerrechtsbewegung Solidarität	6,693	0.01	0	15,960	0.03	0	0	0
Party of Humanists	5,991	0.01	0				0	New
Magdeburg Garden Party	5,617	0.01	0	2,570	0.01	0	0	New
Die Urbane. Eine HipHop Partei	3,032	0.01	0	772	0.00	0	0	New
The Right	2,054	0.00	0	1,142	0.00	0	0	0
Socialist Equality Party	1,291	0.00	0	903	0.00	0	0	0
Bergpartei, die "ÜberPartei"	911	0.00	0	672	0.00	0	0	0
Party of Reason	533	0.00	0	242	0.00	0	0	0
Independents for Citizen-oriented Democracy				2,458	0.01	0	0	0
The Violets				2,176	0.00	0	0	0
Alliance C – Christians for Germany				1,717	0.00	0	0	0
Renter's Party				1,352	0.00	0	0	New
New Liberals				884	0.00	0	0	New
Family Party				506	0.00	0	0	0
Feminist Party				439	0.00	0	0	0
Die Einheit				371	0.00	0	0	New
Independents and voter groups				100,889	0.22	0	0	0
Total	46,515,492	100.00	410	46,389,615	100.00	299	709	+78
Valid votes	46,515,492	99.02		46,389,615	98.75			
Invalid/blank votes	460,849	0.98		586,726	1.25			
Total votes	46,976,341	100.00		46,976,341	100.00			
Registered voters/turnout	61,688,485	76.15		61,688,485	76.15			
Source: Bundeswahlleiter

=== Results by constituency ===
Below are first votes (Erststimme) by constituency.

State	Constituency ("Wahlkreis")	CDU/CSU	SPD	AfD	FDP	Linke	Grüne	Others	Lead
Baden-Württemberg	Aalen-Heidenheim	46.4	21.0	11.0	6.1	5.2	9.6	0.7	25.4
Baden-Württemberg	Backnang-Schwäbisch Gmünd	41.2	20.0	13.2	8.1	5.6	11.3	0.6	21.2
Baden-Württemberg	Biberach	44.5	16.9	11.3	7.5	3.8	13.5	2.5	27.6
Baden-Württemberg	Böblingen	38.8	19.6	11.2	12.8	5.0	11.9	0.7	19.2
Baden-Württemberg	Bodensee	41.4	18.0	10.4	8.8	5.3	13.9	2.3	23.4
Baden-Württemberg	Bruchsal-Schwetzingen	41.5	19.5	14.4	6.7	4.6	8.3	5.0	22.0
Baden-Württemberg	Calw	43.3	16.9	14.1	9.3	4.5	8.8	3.1	26.4
Baden-Württemberg	Emmendingen-Lahr	37.6	23.7	10.8	8.6	5.2	11.1	2.9	15.7
Baden-Württemberg	Esslingen	40.0	19.2	10.7	8.7	5.9	15.3	0.3	20.8
Baden-Württemberg	Freiburg	28.0	22.7	7.2	5.3	7.3	25.7	3.7	2.3
Baden-Württemberg	Göppingen	37.6	21.9	14.5	9.2	4.4	12.1	0.3	15.7
Baden-Württemberg	Heidelberg	32.7	26.0	8.9	6.6	6.1	16.7	3.0	6.7
Baden-Württemberg	Heilbronn	35.3	23.2	15.6	9.6	4.6	8.1	3.6	12.1
Baden-Württemberg	Karlsruhe-Land	40.4	19.7	11.7	9.1	4.6	11.4	3.1	20.7
Baden-Württemberg	Karlsruhe-Stadt	28.5	23.6	10.0	8.6	7.6	17.6	4.0	4.9
Baden-Württemberg	Konstanz	44.8	16.8	9.6	7.3	7.0	13.4	1.2	28.0
Baden-Württemberg	Lörrach-Müllheim	39.4	21.1	9.6	8.7	5.0	15.0	1.2	18.3
Baden-Württemberg	Ludwigsburg	38.3	17.8	11.6	10.2	5.5	14.2	2.4	20.5
Baden-Württemberg	Mannheim	29.3	27.9	12.5	6.9	7.4	13.1	2.9	1.4
Baden-Württemberg	Neckar-Zaber	40.0	19.7	12.6	8.8	4.6	12.5	1.9	20.3
Baden-Württemberg	Nürtingen	39.4	19.0	11.9	9.9	4.8	14.8	0.2	20.4
Baden-Württemberg	Odenwald-Tauber	46.8	19.1	13.6	7.1	5.2	6.9	1.3	27.7
Baden-Württemberg	Offenburg	48.1	17.3	10.4	6.2	5.4	12.6	0.0	30.8
Baden-Württemberg	Pforzheim	36.4	19.0	15.8	11.9	4.7	9.6	2.5	17.4
Baden-Württemberg	Rastatt	44.1	19.0	12.2	7.2	4.6	10.9	2.0	25.1
Baden-Württemberg	Ravensburg	38.5	12.4	9.4	10.1	5.4	20.2	4.0	18.3
Baden-Württemberg	Reutlingen	40.8	15.0	12.0	10.0	6.2	14.3	1.7	25.8
Baden-Württemberg	Rhein-Neckar	37.4	23.9	13.1	8.1	5.2	9.6	2.7	13.5
Baden-Württemberg	Rottweil-Tuttlingen	43.0	15.9	13.0	10.8	3.9	9.5	3.8	27.1
Baden-Württemberg	Schwäbisch Hall - Hohenlohe	40.5	18.5	13.5	8.4	4.3	12.6	2.2	22.0
Baden-Württemberg	Schwarzwald-Baar	47.0	16.7	11.4	8.4	4.3	9.8	2.4	30.3
Baden-Württemberg	Stuttgart I	32.0	12.8	6.7	8.4	6.5	29.7	3.9	2.3
Baden-Württemberg	Stuttgart II	33.5	18.5	10.4	8.6	8.9	15.9	4.2	15.0
Baden-Württemberg	Tübingen	35.7	17.3	8.7	7.9	8.8	19.1	2.6	16.6
Baden-Württemberg	Ulm	42.7	20.2	10.7	8.1	4.6	12.0	1.8	22.5
Baden-Württemberg	Waiblingen	36.8	19.2	12.4	13.4	4.9	12.2	1.1	17.6
Baden-Württemberg	Waldshut	41.9	24.1	9.2	6.2	5.0	11.9	1.8	17.8
Baden-Württemberg	Zollernalb-Sigamaringen	45.0	14.4	13.6	9.3	4.7	12.7	0.3	30.6
Baden-Württemberg	Total	39.3	19.5	11.5	8.6	5.4	13.4	2.2	19.8
Bavaria	Altötting	54.5	12.3	13.1	5.6	4.8	6.0	3.5	41.4
Bavaria	Erding – Ebersberg	48.2	14.9	10.3	7.3	4.0	10.2	5.1	33.3
Bavaria	Freising	43.0	13.5	12.5	7.2	5.0	9.4	9.4	29.5
Bavaria	Fürstenfeldbruck	43.6	18.7	10.2	7.2	4.1	9.1	7.0	24.9
Bavaria	Ingolstadt	49.5	13.6	13.0	5.1	4.8	6.3	7.6	35.9
Bavaria	München-Nord	32.2	26.0	7.6	9.6	6.0	13.1	5.4	6.2
Bavaria	München-Ost	36.8	21.3	7.4	8.9	6.3	15.2	4.1	15.5
Bavaria	München-Süd	33.0	23.5	7.6	9.1	7.4	13.8	5.6	9.5
Bavaria	München-West/Mitte	33.3	23.1	6.7	9.0	7.1	16.3	4.5	10.2
Bavaria	München-Land	43.5	16.3	8.4	9.3	3.9	13.7	4.8	27.2
Bavaria	Rosenheim	45.9	11.8	13.0	7.4	3.8	9.4	8.6	32.9
Bavaria	Bad Tölz-Wolfratshausen – Miesbach	47.6	11.3	9.9	8.2	5.3	13.6	4.2	34.0
Bavaria	Starnberg – Landsberg am Lech	42.1	16.7	8.9	9.6	4.0	11.9	6.9	25.4
Bavaria	Traunstein	50.3	16.1	10.2	5.7	4.5	8.1	5.1	34.2
Bavaria	Weilheim	47.6	14.8	10.1	7.0	4.7	9.1	6.4	32.8
Bavaria	Deggendorf	44.1	17.4	17.3	4.0	4.2	4.5	8.6	26.7
Bavaria	Landshut	39.6	13.6	12.6	8.5	3.6	6.5	15.6	24.0
Bavaria	Passau	47.5	18.9	14.1	6.1	4.8	5.6	3.1	28.6
Bavaria	Rottal-Inn	45.0	14.4	15.1	7.0	3.9	4.9	9.7	28.6
Bavaria	Straubing	47.6	16.8	15.0	4.4	3.7	3.6	8.8	30.8
Bavaria	Amberg	47.7	15.2	11.2	5.0	4.4	6.9	9.5	32.5
Bavaria	Regensburg	40.1	16.7	11.8	6.2	6.0	9.3	9.9	23.4
Bavaria	Schwandorf	48.5	24.2	0.0	4.6	5.0	3.9	13.9	24.3
Bavaria	Weiden	46.2	22.3	0.0	4.1	4.4	3.6	19.3	23.9
Bavaria	Bamberg	42.1	20.4	11.5	6.5	5.2	9.2	5.1	21.7
Bavaria	Bayreuth	46.5	21.2	9.4	6.6	4.3	7.1	4.8	18.9
Bavaria	Coburg	45.3	26.4	10.5	4.8	5.2	5.9	2.0	18.9
Bavaria	Hof	47.0	23.6	11.8	3.7	4.4	4.7	4.7	23.4
Bavaria	Kulmbach	55.4	16.1	11.6	4.0	3.8	4.4	4.7	39.3
Bavaria	Ansbach	44.3	18.4	10.5	4.2	6.1	7.6	9.0	25.9
Bavaria	Erlangen	42.7	21.0	7.9	5.9	5.9	11.0	5.6	21.7
Bavaria	Fürth	39.9	22.9	10.6	5.4	6.8	9.7	4.8	17.0
Bavaria	Nürnberg-Nord	31.3	25.6	9.2	7.2	10.0	12.7	4.0	5.7
Bavaria	Nürnberg-Süd	45.6	26.5	13.2	5.8	8.2	7.8	2.8	19.1
Bavaria	Roth	34.5	20.6	10.3	4.7	4.8	7.9	7.3	13.9
Bavaria	Aschaffenburg	48.1	16.6	10.5	8.0	5.8	9.2	2.9	31.5
Bavaria	Bad Kissingen	51.1	19.1	10.5	5.6	5.4	7.1	1.2	32.0
Bavaria	Main-Spessart	46.6	22.6	9.1	5.0	4.8	7.1	4.8	24.0
Bavaria	Schweinfurt	47.9	17.1	11.1	6.2	7.8	7.4	2.4	30.8
Bavaria	Würzburg	42.2	18.7	7.7	8.0	5.6	14.0	3.8	23.5
Bavaria	Augsburg-Stadt	34.8	19.3	13.3	6.1	8.5	13.9	4.2	15.5
Bavaria	Augsburg-Land	47.8	14.1	12.3	6.1	3.7	7.5	8.6	33.7
Bavaria	Donau-Ries	47.0	18.1	12.8	5.0	4.2	6.4	6.4	28.9
Bavaria	Neu-Ulm	44.6	14.6	13.6	6.0	4.4	9.2	7.6	30.0
Bavaria	Oberallgäu	50.5	12.2	9.6	7.0	4.7	9.2	6.8	38.3
Bavaria	Ostallgäu	49.2	11.4	12.6	5.6	5.3	8.7	7.1	36.6
Bavaria	Total	44.2	18.1	10.5	6.5	5.2	9.0	6.5	26.1
Berlin	Charlottenburg-Wilmersdorf	30.2	27.6	7.5	9.2	9.4	13.6	2.4	2.6
Berlin	Friedrichshain-Kreuzberg – Prenzlauer Berg Ost	12.2	16.9	6.2	3.1	24.9	26.3	10.4	1.4
Berlin	Lichtenberg	19.7	14.1	15.7	3.4	34.8	5.9	6.4	15.1
Berlin	Marzahn-Hellersdorf	22.3	12.6	20.6	3.5	34.2	3.2	3.6	11.9
Berlin	Mitte	18.6	23.5	7.9	6.0	20.5	18.0	5.6	3.0
Berlin	Neukölln	24.5	26.8	10.7	5.1	16.4	11.0	5.5	2.3
Berlin	Pankow	19.6	16.4	12.1	4.2	28.8	14.2	4.8	9.2
Berlin	Reinickendorf	36.8	23.6	13.2	7.2	7.7	7.9	3.6	13.2
Berlin	Spandau-Charlottenburg Nord	30.9	32.1	13.4	6.4	7.6	6.2	3.4	1.2
Berlin	Steglitz-Zehlendorf	35.4	24.6	8.2	9.1	7.5	12.7	2.6	10.8
Berlin	Tempelhof-Schöneberg	28.9	22.0	9.1	6.4	10.8	18.9	3.9	6.9
Berlin	Treptow-Köpenick	18.9	13.8	15.0	3.8	39.9	5.0	3.7	21.0
Berlin	Total	24.7	21.0	11.4	5.6	20.2	12.4	4.7	3.7
Brandenburg	Prignitz – Ostprignitz-Ruppin – Havelland I	30.8	23.7	18.0	3.6	17.6	3.0	3.3	7.1
Brandenburg	Uckermark – Barnim I	30.6	19.4	20.2	3.8	18.5	3.7	3.9	10.4
Brandenburg	Oberhavel – Havelland II	29.9	22.7	18.0	5.2	14.7	5.3	4.2	7.2
Brandenburg	Märkisch-Oderland – Barnim II	28.4	15.8	20.2	4.2	22.5	5.4	3.4	5.9
Brandenburg	Brandenburg an der Havel – Potsdam-Mittelmark I – Havelland III – Teltow-Fläming I	31.8	25.1	26.9	4.6	15.1	3.4	3.1	4.9
Brandenburg	Potsdam – Potsdam-Mittelmark II – Teltow-Fläming II	25.9	26.1	12.3	7.5	16.5	8.0	4.7	0.2
Brandenburg	Dahme-Spreewald – Teltow-Fläming III – Oberspreewald-Lausitz I	30.7	19.6	20.3	4.8	16.4	4.4	3.8	10.4
Brandenburg	Frankfurt (Oder) – Oder-Spree	27.1	17.1	21.9	5.1	19.1	3.3	6.4	5.2
Brandenburg	Cottbus – Spree-Neiße	28.4	17.0	25.3	5.7	15.7	3.3	4.6	3.1
Brandenburg	Elbe-Elster – Oberspreewald-Lausitz II	29.5	16.7	24.7	5.4	16.2	2.9	4.7	4.8
Brandenburg	Total	29.0	20.5	19.4	5.1	17.2	4.5	4.2	8.5
Bremen	Bremen I	24.2	30.0	7.7	11.2	12.2	11.9	2.7	5.8
Bremen	Bremen II-Bremerhaven	25.0	34.0	11.4	6.7	11.5	7.7	3.7	9.0
Bremen	Total	24.6	31.8	9.3	9.2	11.9	10.1	3.2	7.2
Hamburg	Altona	25.9	28.9	5.1	8.6	13.6	14.4	3.4	3.0
Hamburg	Bergedorf-Harburg	28.1	34.8	10.9	5.2	10.7	7.7	2.6	6.7
Hamburg	Eimsbüttel	28.7	31.6	5.7	6.8	10.4	15.0	1.8	2.9
Hamburg	Mitte	24.2	30.9	7.3	6.4	13.9	12.9	4.4	6.7
Hamburg	Nord	33.5	30.8	5.5	8.4	7.5	13.6	0.7	2.7
Hamburg	Wandsbek	29.7	34.6	9.5	7.0	9.2	7.1	2.9	4.9
Hamburg	Total	28.5	32.0	7.3	7.1	10.8	11.7	2.6	3.5
Hesse	Waldeck	33.6	35.1	11.0	7.1	6.1	5.7	1.4	1.5
Hesse	Kassel	26.9	35.6	10.0	5.9	8.8	9.4	3.6	8.7
Hesse	Werra-Meißner – Hersfeld-Rotenburg	29.9	41.2	12.5	5.0	5.5	4.0	1.8	11.3
Hesse	Schwalm-Eder	30.4	37.7	12.0	6.5	5.5	5.6	2.3	7.3
Hesse	Marburg	33.4	35.7	10.2	4.3	8.2	6.4	1.8	2.3
Hesse	Lahn-Dill	38.3	29.7	11.7	6.3	4.7	5.8	3.5	8.6
Hesse	Gießen	35.1	28.2	11.5	7.7	6.3	8.3	2.9	6.9
Hesse	Fulda	45.2	20.2	17.6	5.3	4.8	5.6	1.4	25.0
Hesse	Main-Kinzig – Wetterau II – Schotten	36.4	28.3	14.8	6.1	5.9	5.4	3.0	8.1
Hesse	Hochtaunus	39.9	23.0	10.4	10.4	5.9	8.9	1.4	16.9
Hesse	Wetterau I	36.4	29.0	10.9	8.1	4.9	8.3	2.3	7.4
Hesse	Rheingau-Taunus – Limburg	41.8	25.3	10.2	7.6	5.5	7.0	2.6	16.5
Hesse	Wiesbaden	34.3	28.6	10.4	7.0	7.7	8.9	3.1	5.7
Hesse	Hanau	35.3	30.4	12.8	6.4	5.8	6.1	3.1	4.9
Hesse	Main-Taunus	41.9	21.8	9.7	10.9	5.0	9.1	1.7	20.1
Hesse	Frankfurt am Main I	30.5	27.1	9.0	9.2	9.7	10.9	3.5	3.4
Hesse	Frankfurt am Main II	32.4	25.9	7.6	8.1	9.1	13.5	3.3	6.5
Hesse	(electoral district)Groß-Gerau	35.1	32.4	11.3	5.6	6.7	6.8	2.1	2.7
Hesse	Offenbach	36.4	24.9	11.2	7.7	7.7	8.8	3.2	11.5
Hesse	Darmstadt	30.7	29.7	9.1	6.2	8.5	14.2	1.6	1.0
Hesse	Odenwald	36.1	29.0	11.7	7.2	6.1	7.8	2.0	7.1
Hesse	Bergstraße	38.9	26.9	12.5	7.6	5.5	7.6	0.9	12.0
Hesse	Total	35.4	29.2	11.2	7.1	6.6	8.1	2.4	6.2
Mecklenburg-Vorpommern	Ludwigslust-Parchim II-Nordwestmecklenburg II-Landkreis Rostock I	30.0	24.0	17.4	5.7	16.2	4.0	2.6	6.0
Mecklenburg-Vorpommern	Mecklenburgische Seenplatte I-Vorpommern-Greifswald II	31.2	13.9	23.5	5.8	19.1	2.5	4.1	7.7
Mecklenburg-Vorpommern	Mecklenburgische Seenplatte II-Landkreis Rostock III	37.6	15.7	18.4	4.7	17.4	3.3	2.9	19.2
Mecklenburg-Vorpommern	Schwerin-Ludwigslust-Parchim I-Nordwestmecklenburg I	32.1	22.1	16.0	4.8	17.2	3.8	4.1	10.0
Mecklenburg-Vorpommern	Rostock-Landkreis Rostock II	29.5	17.9	14.7	4.5	24.8	5.1	3.4	4.7
Mecklenburg-Vorpommern	Vorpommern-Rügen-Vorpommern-Greifswald I	44.0	11.6	19.2	3.1	15.9	3.0	3.1	24.8
Mecklenburg-Vorpommern	Total	34.2	17.4	18.2	4.7	18.5	3.6	3.4	15.7
Lower Saxony	Aurich – Emden	27.6	49.6	0.0	4.9	6.7	7.0	4.1	22.0
Lower Saxony	Unterems	50.0	28.0	7.7	4.4	4.4	4.7	0.7	22.0
Lower Saxony	Friesland – Wilhelmshaven – Wittmund	32.4	39.7	8.3	5.9	5.9	5.5	2.3	7.3
Lower Saxony	Oldenburg – Ammerland	30.2	36.3	6.7	6.1	8.1	11.4	1.3	6.1
Lower Saxony	Delmenhorst – Wesermarsch – Oldenburg-Land	34.1	32.9	9.0	9.0	6.1	7.7	1.2	1.2
Lower Saxony	Cuxhaven – Stade II	42.7	30.7	8.5	5.0	5.8	6.1	1.3	12.0
Lower Saxony	Stade I – Rotenburg II	44.4	28.2	8.3	5.8	5.3	7.0	1.0	16.2
Lower Saxony	Mittelems	53.6	26.4	5.0	5.6	3.8	5.0	0.5	27.2
Lower Saxony	Cloppenburg – Vechta	57.7	20.4	7.8	5.1	4.1	4.3	0.6	37.3
Lower Saxony	Diepholz – Nienburg I	44.6	27.3	8.1	7.0	5.3	7.7	0.0	17.3
Lower Saxony	Osterholz – Verden	39.2	32.0	8.6	5.5	7.1	6.7	1.0	7.2
Lower Saxony	Rotenburg I – Heidekreis	36.1	41.2	8.2	4.5	4.1	4.8	1.1	5.1
Lower Saxony	Harburg	40.6	27.4	9.2	6.5	5.4	9.1	1.7	13.2
Lower Saxony	Lüchow-Dannenberg – Lüneburg	33.5	28.1	8.7	6.6	8.4	14.8	0.0	5.4
Lower Saxony	Osnabrück-Land	45.6	28.3	6.6	6.4	5.3	7.7	0.2	17.3
Lower Saxony	Stadt Osnabrück	40.3	31.6	0.0	8.9	8.4	10.1	0.6	8.7
Lower Saxony	Nienburg II – Schaumburg	40.6	32.7	9.1	4.5	4.5	7.7	0.8	7.9
Lower Saxony	Stadt Hannover I	29.6	35.6	8.5	6.5	7.2	9.1	3.4	6.0
Lower Saxony	Stadt Hannover II	28.9	33.7	7.2	5.5	9.3	11.2	4.2	4.8
Lower Saxony	Hannover-Land I	40.1	33.1	9.6	5.2	5.0	6.0	1.1	7.0
Lower Saxony	Celle – Uelzen	42.7	30.0	10.1	5.5	4.6	5.8	1.1	12.7
Lower Saxony	Gifhorn – Peine	36.1	37.8	9.9	4.8	5.3	5.6	0.6	1.7
Lower Saxony	Hameln-Pyrmont – Holzminden	33.4	39.1	9.5	5.8	5.9	5.4	0.9	5.7
Lower Saxony	Hannover-Land II	35.2	37.0	9.4	5.4	5.4	5.7	1.8	1.8
Lower Saxony	Hildesheim	36.0	37.2	8.6	5.6	5.1	7.6	0.0	1.2
Lower Saxony	Salzgitter – Wolfenbüttel	29.1	42.8	11.9	4.7	6.0	4.3	1.1	13.7
Lower Saxony	Braunschweig	31.4	38.0	7.8	5.4	7.6	8.0	1.8	6.6
Lower Saxony	Helmstedt – Wolfsburg	34.9	38.0	10.2	5.7	6.0	4.5	0.7	3.1
Lower Saxony	Goslar – Northeim – Osterode	39.8	34.8	9.3	5.0	5.7	5.4	0.0	5.0
Lower Saxony	Göttingen	33.3	34.9	7.0	4.6	5.9	11.3	3.1	1.6
Lower Saxony	Total	38.3	33.6	8.0	5.7	5.9	7.2	1.3	5.7
North Rhine-Westphalia	Aachen I	33.7	32.5	5.6	7.3	8.8	9.4	2.6	1.2
North Rhine-Westphalia	Aachen II	36.5	36.9	8.8	6.4	5.1	4.5	1.7	0.4
North Rhine-Westphalia	Heinsberg	45.6	28.0	8.3	6.6	4.6	5.0	2.0	17.6
North Rhine-Westphalia	Düren	41.9	31.7	8.9	5.9	4.4	5.5	1.7	10.2
North Rhine-Westphalia	Rhein-Erft-Kreis I	39.2	31.1	9.0	9.3	4.5	5.5	1.4	8.1
North Rhine-Westphalia	Euskirchen – Rhein-Erft-Kreis II	42.8	26.2	9.5	9.9	5.8	5.8	0.0	16.6
North Rhine-Westphalia	Köln I	31.6	31.0	8.6	7.7	8.6	9.8	2.7	0.6
North Rhine-Westphalia	Köln II	34.9	26.9	4.6	9.1	8.0	14.6	2.0	8.0
North Rhine-Westphalia	Köln III	27.6	23.3	7.5	7.1	9.7	13.2	2.6	4.3
North Rhine-Westphalia	Bonn	32.0	34.9	6.1	10.5	5.7	8.4	2.4	2.9
North Rhine-Westphalia	Rhein-Sieg-Kreis I	44.3	27.7	0.0	10.4	8.1	6.5	3.0	16.6
North Rhine-Westphalia	Rhein-Sieg-Kreis II	46.5	22.7	8.4	8.4	5.5	7.9	0.5	23.8
North Rhine-Westphalia	Oberbergischer Kreis	43.7	26.7	10.1	7.8	5.2	6.1	0.3	17.0
North Rhine-Westphalia	Rheinisch-Bergischer Kreis	40.0	24.4	7.2	15.7	4.9	6.9	0.8	15.6
North Rhine-Westphalia	Leverkusen – Köln IV	30.8	38.7	8.7	6.6	6.1	5.7	3.4	7.9
North Rhine-Westphalia	Wuppertal I	31.5	29.6	11.0	8.7	8.9	7.4	2.8	1.9
North Rhine-Westphalia	Solingen – Remscheid – Wuppertal II	38.2	30.8	9.5	7.8	6.2	5.8	1.6	7.4
North Rhine-Westphalia	Mettmann I	44.6	25.7	8.9	8.3	5.5	6.9	0.0	18.9
North Rhine-Westphalia	Mettmann II	39.3	30.2	9.0	8.7	5.5	6.1	1.2	9.1
North Rhine-Westphalia	Düsseldorf I	40.4	24.4	6.4	12.8	7.4	8.4	0.2	16.0
North Rhine-Westphalia	Düsseldorf II	33.8	27.3	8.1	9.2	13.0	8.3	0.2	6.5
North Rhine-Westphalia	Neuss I	44.0	28.6	8.6	7.2	5.4	5.1	1.0	15.4
North Rhine-Westphalia	Mönchengladbach	44.3	24.4	9.1	7.8	6.8	6.0	1.6	19.9
North Rhine-Westphalia	Krefeld I – Neuss II	42.4	25.5	7.3	11.5	5.1	6.6	1.6	16.9
North Rhine-Westphalia	Viersen	47.9	25.0	7.0	8.3	5.1	6.7	0.0	22.9
North Rhine-Westphalia	Kleve	45.0	30.6	6.6	7.6	4.2	4.9	1.1	14.4
North Rhine-Westphalia	Wesel I	39.0	32.8	8.6	8.0	6.0	5.5	0.2	6.2
North Rhine-Westphalia	Krefeld II – Wesel II	37.0	32.0	8.5	8.2	5.6	6.1	2.7	5.0
North Rhine-Westphalia	Duisburg I	28.7	38.3	11.5	7.0	6.9	5.6	2.1	9.6
North Rhine-Westphalia	Duisburg II	26.4	34.7	16.6	7.0	8.9	4.6	1.8	8.3
North Rhine-Westphalia	Oberhausen – Wesel III	29.1	38.5	12.3	6.3	7.6	5.6	0.6	9.4
North Rhine-Westphalia	Mülheim – Essen I	31.3	34.9	11.5	9.0	6.5	6.2	0.5	3.6
North Rhine-Westphalia	Essen II	26.6	37.3	15.8	6.6	7.9	5.4	0.4	10.7
North Rhine-Westphalia	Essen III	37.1	30.8	8.1	8.3	6.5	8.2	1.0	6.3
North Rhine-Westphalia	Recklinghausen I	30.9	38.7	11.4	7.2	6.6	5.0	0.3	7.8
North Rhine-Westphalia	Recklinghausen II	34.5	41.1	0.0	10.2	8.4	4.7	1.0	6.6
North Rhine-Westphalia	Gelsenkirchen	25.4	38.3	16.9	6.7	6.5	4.6	1.6	12.9
North Rhine-Westphalia	Steinfurt I – Borken I	51.3	25.8	6.0	6.6	4.9	5.3	0.0	25.5
North Rhine-Westphalia	Bottrop – Recklinghausen III	33.6	36.8	11.8	6.5	6.3	4.4	0.6	3.2
North Rhine-Westphalia	Borken II	52.3	25.3	0.0	9.1	4.5	6.7	2.0	27.0
North Rhine-Westphalia	Coesfeld – Steinfurt II	51.6	23.5	0.0	10.5	6.2	8.2	0.0	28.1
North Rhine-Westphalia	Steinfurt III	44.8	30.3	6.3	5.6	5.6	6.5	0.8	14.5
North Rhine-Westphalia	Münster	37.2	28.9	4.5	7.0	6.9	12.8	2.8	8.3
North Rhine-Westphalia	Warendorf	46.4	27.9	6.9	7.0	4.8	5.5	1.5	18.5
North Rhine-Westphalia	Gütersloh I	46.6	28.0	8.0	6.5	4.3	5.7	0.8	18.6
North Rhine-Westphalia	Bielefeld – Gütersloh II	30.7	33.2	8.2	7.3	9.0	9.6	2.0	2.5
North Rhine-Westphalia	Herford – Minden-Lübbecke II	35.8	36.7	10.0	5.6	5.6	5.1	1.2	0.9
North Rhine-Westphalia	Minden-Lübbecke I	37.4	35.5	9.9	7.1	5.3	4.9	0.0	1.9
North Rhine-Westphalia	Lippe I	36.6	32.1	10.2	8.4	5.4	6.0	1.3	4.5
North Rhine-Westphalia	Höxter – Lippe II	44.3	26.7	9.1	6.9	5.5	6.0	1.5	17.6
North Rhine-Westphalia	Paderborn – Gütersloh III	53.3	19.9	9.1	5.5	5.1	6.0	1.0	33.4
North Rhine-Westphalia	Hagen – Ennepe-Ruhr-Kreis I	30.3	39.2	11.3	7.9	5.4	3.9	2.0	8.9
North Rhine-Westphalia	Ennepe-Ruhr-Kreis II	32.9	36.7	0.0	10.5	8.0	8.6	3.2	3.8
North Rhine-Westphalia	Bochum I	28.2	37.2	9.5	7.0	10.0	7.7	0.3	9.0
North Rhine-Westphalia	Herne – Bochum II	24.1	41.9	13.4	6.7	8.0	5.6	0.3	17.8
North Rhine-Westphalia	Dortmund I	28.6	38.8	9.5	5.9	7.7	7.3	2.2	10.2
North Rhine-Westphalia	Dortmund II	28.1	38.8	10.6	6.4	8.6	6.4	1.1	10.7
North Rhine-Westphalia	Unna I	31.8	38.8	9.1	6.4	5.4	6.4	2.1	7.0
North Rhine-Westphalia	Hamm – Unna II	35.2	36.4	10.4	5.9	5.9	4.4	1.8	1.2
North Rhine-Westphalia	Soest	42.7	29.3	8.9	7.9	5.7	5.5	0.1	13.4
North Rhine-Westphalia	Hochsauerlandkreis	48.0	26.9	7.3	8.4	4.2	4.2	0.9	21.1
North Rhine-Westphalia	Siegen-Wittgenstein	40.1	30.2	9.8	7.3	5.9	4.3	2.3	9.9
North Rhine-Westphalia	Olpe – Märkischer Kreis I	47.9	26.3	8.8	8.8	4.8	3.4	0.0	21.6
North Rhine-Westphalia	Märkischer Kreis II	37.8	38.6	0.0	10.7	7.8	3.8	1.3	0.8
North Rhine-Westphalia	Total	38.3	31.3	8.1	8.0	6.4	6.5	1.3	7.0
Rhineland-Palatinate	Neuwied	43.2	28.6	9.5	6.1	5.3	5.3	1.9	14.6
Rhineland-Palatinate	Ahrweiler	42.8	27.4	8.8	8.7	4.5	5.8	2.1	15.4
Rhineland-Palatinate	Koblenz	41.3	28.7	8.2	6.5	5.2	6.2	3.9	12.6
Rhineland-Palatinate	Mosel/Rhein-Hunsrück	44.1	25.2	8.2	8.7	5.3	4.9	3.7	18.9
Rhineland-Palatinate	Kreuznach	37.0	31.5	10.8	6.8	5.53	4.9	3.5	5.5
Rhineland-Palatinate	Bitburg	51.2	25.7	7.1	7.0	5.5	0.0	3.5	25.5
Rhineland-Palatinate	Trier	37.9	33.7	7.0	5.3	6.6	6.5	3.1	4.2
Rhineland-Palatinate	Montabaur	43.3	29.8	0.0	9.2	7.0	5.2	5.5	13.5
Rhineland-Palatinate	Mainz	35.7	28.0	7.3	6.9	6.4	10.8	4.8	17.7
Rhineland-Palatinate	Worms	41.1	26.7	11.3	6.0	5.1	6.7	3.1	14.4
Rhineland-Palatinate	Ludwigshafen/Frankenthal	32.1	31.9	14.5	7.5	5.6	5.5	2.9	10.2
Rhineland-Palatinate	Neustadt – Speyer	40.0	25.3	11.9	6.8	4.7	7.6	3.7	14.7
Rhineland-Palatinate	Kaiserslautern	31.3	33.9	12.6	5.5	7.2	5.1	4.3	2.6
Rhineland-Palatinate	Pirmasens	33.8	28.8	12.8	6.7	6.1	4.2	4.6	5.0
Rhineland-Palatinate	Südpfalz	40.3	26.0	12.3	6.0	4.7	7.9	2.7	14.3
Rhineland-Palatinate	Total	39.6	28.8	9.5	6.9	5.7	6.0	3.6	10.8
Saarland	Homburg	33.6	31.4	11.0	5.1	11.0	5.0	2.9	2.2
Saarland	Saarbrücken	31.4	32.1	8.9	5.3	13.3	6.0	2.9	0.7
Saarland	Saarlouis	38.0	32.1	9.0	3.8	10.8	3.5	2.7	5.9
Saarland	St. Wendel	41.8	30.4	8.4	4.7	9.8	3.4	1.6	11.4
Saarland	Total	36.2	31.5	9.3	4.7	11.2	4.5	2.6	4.7
Saxony	Nordsachsen	32.8	14.0	26.8	6.6	17.2	2.6	0.0	6.0
Saxony	Leipzig I	27.5	16.5	20.5	5.7	19.5	5.5	4.9	7.0
Saxony	Leipzig II	24.6	13.7	15.0	5.8	25.3	9.9	5.7	0.7
Saxony	Leipzig-Land	34.1	11.5	28.7	6.3	15.6	3.9	0.0	5.4
Saxony	Meißen	36.7	8.9	31.0	5.3	12.7	3.3	2.1	5.7
Saxony	Bautzen I	30.6	10.0	33.2	5.8	15.2	2.0	3.1	2.6
Saxony	Görlitz	31.4	10.9	32.4	5.0	13.6	3.3	3.4	1.0
Saxony	Sächsische Schweiz-Osterzgebirge	28.8	7.2	37.4	6.5	14.7	3.0	2.4	8.6
Saxony	Dresden I	24.6	13.2	22.4	7.5	21.0	6.5	4.8	2.2
Saxony	Dresden II – Bautzen II	25.5	11.1	22.3	7.0	17.5	8.6	7.9	3.2
Saxony	Mittelsachsen	32.4	12.0	31.5	5.8	14.0	3.1	1.2	0.9
Saxony	Chemnitz	26.6	15.4	24.0	6.6	19.4	4.2	3.9	2.6
Saxony	Chemnitzer Umland – Erzgebirgskreis II	35.1	10.3	26.6	7.6	17.0	3.4	0.0	8.5
Saxony	Erzgebirgskreis I	34.7	9.0	30.2	7.2	15.2	2.6	1.0	4.5
Saxony	Zwickau	33.7	12.7	0.0	13.4	25.7	4.5	9.9	8.0
Saxony	Vogtlandkreis	35.0	11.1	26.0	5.6	15.5	3.8	3.1	9.0
Saxony	Total	30.6	11.7	25.4	6.7	17.5	4.5	3.5	5.2
Saxony-Anhalt	Altmark	32.6	19.1	16.5	6.7	19.2	3.4	2.5	13.4
Saxony-Anhalt	Börde – Jerichower Land	37.8	20.0	20.3	0.0	7.6	2.4	11.9	17.5
Saxony-Anhalt	Harz	36.4	17.5	16.1	4.9	19.2	3.2	2.6	17.2
Saxony-Anhalt	Magdeburg	27.4	21.7	15.3	6.7	18.9	4.0	6.0	5.7
Saxony-Anhalt	Dessau – Wittenberg	35.2	12.2	19.4	5.0	18.2	4.6	5.4	15.8
Saxony-Anhalt	Anhalt	31.6	12.9	22.2	6.3	21.2	2.0	3.8	9.4
Saxony-Anhalt	Halle	27.1	21.3	17.3	6.7	20.3	3.6	3.6	5.8
Saxony-Anhalt	Burgenland – Saalekreis	33.6	13.1	23.4	6.6	16.9	2.5	3.9	10.2
Saxony-Anhalt	Mansfeld	31.0	15.2	23.9	8.1	18.1	2.6	1.2	7.1
Saxony-Anhalt	Total	32.4	17.2	16.9	6.5	19.2	6.5	4.7	13.2
Schleswig-Holstein	Flensburg – Schleswig	40.0	28.0	6.2	6.5	7.1	10.5	1.6	12.0
Schleswig-Holstein	Nordfriesland – Dithmarschen Nord	45.1	25.2	5.9	8.1	5.2	9.4	1.2	19.9
Schleswig-Holstein	Steinburg – Dithmarschen Süd	41.9	26.1	7.6	11.0	5.5	6.7	1.1	15.8
Schleswig-Holstein	Rendsburg-Eckernförde	42.7	28.9	6.8	6.5	5.2	9.0	1.0	13.8
Schleswig-Holstein	Kiel	30.7	31.0	6.1	7.5	7.3	14.3	3.0	0.3
Schleswig-Holstein	Plön – Neumünster	40.7	28.9	7.8	7.2	5.4	9.0	1.0	11.8
Schleswig-Holstein	Pinneberg	39.7	30.3	7.9	7.8	6.1	8.3	0.0	9.4
Schleswig-Holstein	Segeberg – Stormarn-Mitte	41.1	27.3	8.2	8.1	5.7	8.3	1.2	13.8
Schleswig-Holstein	Ostholstein – Stormarn-Nord	41.5	30.8	7.9	7.3	4.4	6.9	1.2	10.7
Schleswig-Holstein	Herzogtum Lauenburg – Stormarn-Süd	39.5	27.2	9.1	8.2	5.1	9.7	1.1	12.3
Schleswig-Holstein	Lübeck	35.3	33.9	8.7	6.5	0.0	13.0	2.7	1.4
Schleswig-Holstein	Total	39.8	28.8	7.5	7.7	5.3	9.5	1.3	11.0
Thuringia	Eichsfeld-Nordhausen-Kyffhäuserkreis	38.0	14.3	21.4	4.9	15.3	2.6	3.6	16.6
Thuringia	Eisenach-Wartburgkreis-Unstrut-Hainich-Kreis	34.4	15.2	21.2	5.0	15.5	3.1	5.5	13.2
Thuringia	Erfurt-Weimar-Weimarer Land II	27.3	18.2	17.5	6.0	18.7	7.1	5.3	8.6
Thuringia	Gera-Greiz-Altenburger Land	30.4	11.8	27.3	5.6	18.7	2.1	4.0	3.1
Thuringia	Gotha-Ilm-Kreis	29.0	18.6	23.9	6.0	15.6	3.3	3.6	5.1
Thuringia	Jena-Sömmerda-Weimarer Land I	29.2	14.2	19.3	5.8	21.4	4.9	5.2	7.8
Thuringia	Saalfeld-Rudolstadt-Saale-Holzland-Kreis-Saale-Orla-Kreis	30.9	11.7	26.5	6.1	17.1	3.4	4.4	4.4
Thuringia	Suhl-Schmalkalden-Meiningen-Hildburghausen-Sonneberg	33.5	13.5	22.8	4.9	18.3	2.6	4.4	10.7
Thuringia	Total	31.6	14.6	22.5	5.5	17.6	3.6	4.5	9.1

=== Results by state ===
Second Vote (Zweitstimme, or votes for party list) by state

State	CDU/CSU	SPD	AfD	FDP	Linke	Grüne	Others
Baden-Württemberg	34.4	16.4	12.2	12.7	6.4	13.5	4.5
Bavaria	38.8	15.3	12.4	10.2	6.1	9.8	7.5
Berlin	22.7	17.9	12.0	8.9	18.8	12.6	7.0
Brandenburg (Note: (formerly part of East Germany))	26.7	17.6	20.2	7.1	17.2	5.0	6.3
Bremen	25.0	26.3	10.0	9.3	13.5	11.0	4.3
Hamburg	27.2	23.5	7.8	10.8	12.2	13.9	4.5
Hesse	30.9	23.5	11.9	11.6	8.1	9.7	4.4
Mecklenburg-Vorpommern (Note: (formerly part of East Germany))	33.1	15.1	18.6	6.2	17.8	4.3	4.9
Lower Saxony	34.9	27.4	9.1	9.3	6.9	8.7	3.6
North Rhine-Westphalia	32.6	26.0	9.4	13.1	7.5	7.6	3.8
Rhineland-Palatinate	35.9	24.2	11.2	10.4	6.8	7.6	3.9
Saarland	32.4	27.2	10.1	7.6	12.9	6.0	3.9
Saxony (Note: (formerly part of East Germany))	26.9	10.5	27.0	8.2	16.1	4.6	6.7
Saxony-Anhalt (Note: (formerly part of East Germany))	30.3	15.2	19.6	7.8	17.8	3.7	5.7
Schleswig-Holstein	34.0	23.3	8.2	12.6	7.3	12.0	2.7
Thuringia (Note: (formerly part of East Germany))	28.8	13.2	22.7	7.8	16.9	4.1	6.5

CDU-CSU vote

SPD vote

AfD vote

FDP vote

Linke vote

Grüne vote

NPD vote

Turnout

==== Constituency seats ====
State	Total seats	Seats won					
State	Total seats	CDU	SPD	CSU	Linke	AfD	Grüne
Baden-Württemberg	38	38					
Bavaria	46			46			
Berlin	12	4	3		4		1
Brandenburg	10	9	1				
Bremen	2		2				
Hamburg	6	1	5				
Hesse	22	17	5				
Lower Saxony	30	16	14				
Mecklenburg-Vorpommern	6	6					
North Rhine-Westphalia	64	38	26				
Rhineland-Palatinate	15	14	1				
Saarland	4	3	1				
Saxony	16	12			1	3	
Saxony-Anhalt	9	9					
Schleswig-Holstein	11	10	1				
Thuringia	8	8					
Total	299	185	59	46	5	3	1

==== List seats ====
State	Total seats	Seats won					
State	Total seats	SPD	AfD	FDP	Grüne	Linke	CDU
Baden-Württemberg	58	16	11	12	13	6	
Bavaria	62	18	14	12	11	7	
Berlin	16	2	4	3	3	2	2
Brandenburg	15	3	5	2	1	4	
Bremen	4		1		1	1	1
Hamburg	10		1	2	2	2	3
Hesse	28	7	6	6	5	4	
Lower Saxony	36	6	7	7	6	5	5
Mecklenburg-Vorpommern	10	2	3	1	1	3	
North Rhine-Westphalia	78	15	15	20	12	12	4
Rhineland-Palatinate	22	8	4	4	3	3	
Saarland	6	2	1	1	1	1	
Saxony	22	4	8	3	2	5	
Saxony-Anhalt	14	3	4	2	1	4	
Schleswig-Holstein	15	5	2	3	3	2	
Thuringia	14	3	5	2	1	3	
Total	410	94	91	80	66	64	15

== Constitution of the 19th Bundestag ==
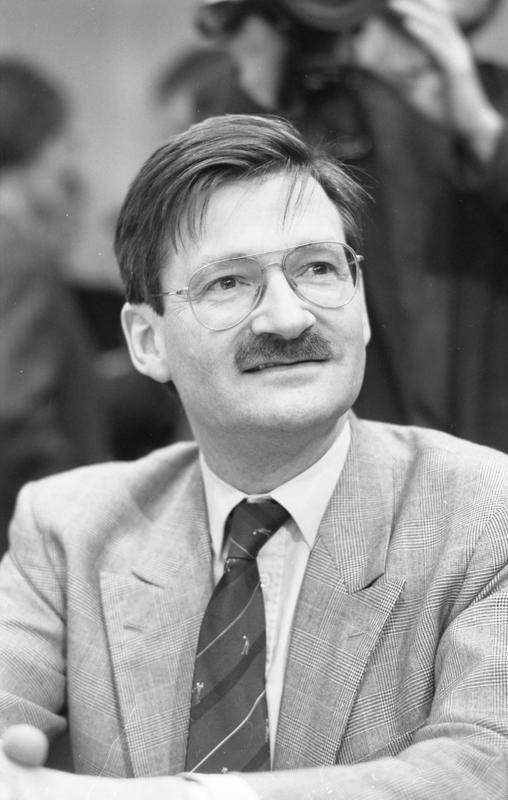
The father of the house of the 19th Bundestag, Hermann Otto Solms

On 24 October 2017 the 19th Bundestag held its opening session, during which the Bundestag-members elected the Presidium of the Bundestag, i.e. the President and the Vice Presidents of the Bundestag. By tradition the biggest parliamentary group (in this case the CDU/CSU-group) has the right to propose a candidate for President of the Bundestag and following the rules of order every group has the right to be represented by at least one Vice President in the presidium. However, the Bundestag may decide to elect additional Vice Presidents. Every member of the presidium had to be elected by an absolute majority of the members of the Bundestag (in this case 355 votes). Until the election of the President of the Bundestag, the father of the house, the member of parliament with the longest membership, presided over the opening session.

- Since he had been a member of the Bundestag for 45 years (since 1972), Wolfgang Schäuble would have been the father of the house. However, since Schäuble was also a candidate for President of the Bundestag and would therefore likely have had to declare his own election, he refused the office. Hermann Otto Solms, who had been a member of the Bundestag for 33 years (1980–2013 and since 2017), stood in for him.
- The CDU/CSU group proposed Wolfgang Schäuble to be President of the Bundestag. Schäuble was elected on the first ballot (501 yes votes, 173 no votes, 30 abstentions, 1 invalid vote).
- The CDU/CSU group proposed Hans-Peter Friedrich to be a Vice President of the Bundestag. Friedrich was elected on the first ballot (507 yes votes, 112 no votes, 82 abstentions, 2 invalid votes).
- The SPD group proposed Thomas Oppermann to be a Vice President of the Bundestag. Oppermann was elected on the first ballot (396 yes votes, 220 no votes, 81 abstentions, 6 invalid votes).
- The AfD group proposed Albrecht Glaser to be a Vice President of the Bundestag. On 2 October 2017 the groups of the SPD, the FDP, The Left and Alliance 90/The Greens criticised the nomination because of controversial remarks about Islam and the basic right of religious freedom made by Glaser during the AfD's election campaign and asked the AfD group to nominate someone else to the post. The AfD group declined to accede to the request and nominate someone else. Glaser failed to get a majority on three ballots, although even a plurality would have been sufficient on the third (first ballot: 115 yes votes, 550 no votes, 26 abstentions, 12 invalid votes, second ballot: 123 yes votes, 549 no votes, 24 abstentions, 1 invalid vote, third ballot: 114 yes votes, 545 no votes, 26 abstentions).
- The FDP group proposed Wolfgang Kubicki to be a Vice President of the Bundestag. Kubicki was elected on the first ballot (489 yes votes, 100 no votes, 111 abstentions, 3 invalid votes).
- The Left group proposed Petra Pau, who has held this position since 2006, to be a Vice President of the Bundestag. Pau was elected on the first ballot (456 yes votes, 187 no votes, 54 abstentions, 6 invalid votes).
- The Alliance 90/Greens group proposed Claudia Roth, who already held this position in the previous legislative session, to be a Vice President of the Bundestag. Roth was elected on the first ballot (489 yes votes, 166 no votes, 45 abstentions, 3 invalid votes).

The AfD's seat in the Presidium has remained vacant since the first session. On 7 November 2018, the AfD-group nominated Mariana Harder-Kühnel to the post. Harder-Kühnel failed to secure a majority on the first ballot on 29 November 2018 (223 yes votes, 387 no votes, 44 abstentions), on the second ballot on 12 December 2018 (241 yes votes, 377 no votes, 41 abstentions), or on the third ballot on 4 April 2019 (199 yes votes, 423 no votes, 43 abstentions) On 9 April 2019, the AfD nominated Gerold Otten to the post; however, he has failed to secure a majority on the first ballot on 11 April 2019 (210 yes votes, 393 no votes, 31 abstentions), on the second ballot on 16 May 2019 (205 yes votes, 399 no votes, 26 abstentions), or on the third ballot on 6 June 2019 (211 yes votes, 426 no votes, 30 abstentions).

== Government formation ==
=== Jamaica coalition ===
The SPD's leader and Chancellor candidate Martin Schulz and other party leaders stated that the SPD would not continue the incumbent grand coalition government after unsatisfactory election results. Following the SPD's announcement that it would return to the opposition, the media speculated that incumbent chancellor Angela Merkel might need to form a Jamaica coalition (black-yellow-green) with the FDP and the Greens as that was the only viable coalition without the AfD or The Left, both of which had been ruled out by Merkel as coalition partners before the election. On 9 October 2017, Merkel officially announced that she would invite the Free Democrats and the Greens for talks about building a coalition government starting on 18 October 2017.

In the final days of the preliminary talks, the four parties had still failed to come to agreement on migration and climate issues. Preliminary talks between the parties collapsed on 20 November after the FDP withdrew, arguing that the talks had failed to produce a common vision or trust.

=== Grand coalition ===
After the collapse of these coalition talks, the German President appealed to the SPD to change their hard stance and to consider a grand coalition with the CDU/CSU. On 24 November, Schulz said he wanted party members to be polled on whether to form another grand coalition with CDU/CSU after a meeting with President Frank-Walter Steinmeier the day before. According to CDU deputy leader Julia Klöckner, talks were unlikely to begin until early 2018. On 6 December the SPD held a party congress in which a majority of the 600 party delegates voted to start preliminary coalition talks with the CDU/CSU. This decision was met with reluctance by the party's youth wing, which organised protests outside the convention hall. Martin Schulz's backing of the coalition talks was interpreted by media organisations as a U-turn, as he had previously ruled out considering a grand coalition.

On 12 January, the CDU/CSU and the SPD announced that they had reached a breakthrough in the preliminary talks and agreed upon an outline document to begin formal negotiations for the grand coalition. On 21 January, the SPD held an extraordinary party conference of 642 delegates in Bonn. The conference voted in favour of accepting the conclusion of preliminary talks and launching formal coalition negotiations with the CDU/CSU. The formal coalition talks finally began on 26 January.

On 7 February, the CDU/CSU and SPD announced that the final coalition agreement had been reached between the parties to form the next government. According to terms of the agreement, the SPD received six ministries in the new government including the finance, foreign affairs and labour portfolios while the CDU received five and the CSU three ministries. The agreement stipulated there would be rises in public spending, an increase in German financing of the EU and a slightly stricter stance taken towards immigration. SPD chairperson and Europe expert Martin Schulz was to step down as party leader and join the cabinet as foreign minister, despite having previously stated that he would not serve under a Merkel-led government. However, only days after these reports were published, Schulz renounced his plan to be foreign minister reacting on massive criticism by the party base. The complete text of the coalition agreement was published on 7 February. The coalition deal was subject to approval of the approximately 460,000 members of the SPD in a postal vote. The results of the vote were announced on 4 March. In summary, 66% of respondents voted in favour of the deal and 34% voted against it. Approximately 78% of the SPD membership responded to the postal vote. The result allowed the new government to take office immediately following Bundestag approval of Merkel's fourth term on 14 March 2018.
