= Main-Kinzig – Wetterau II – Schotten =

Federal electoral district of Germany

174 Main-Kinzig – Wetterau II – Schotten
- Electoral district for the Bundestag
- Main-Kinzig – Wetterau II – Schotten in 2025
- State: Hesse
- Population: 233,900 (2019)
- Electorate: 178,307 (2021)
- Major settlements: Gelnhausen; Büdingen; Schlüchtern
- Area: 1,539.5 km^{2}

Current electoral district
- Created: 2013
- Party: CDU
- Member: Johannes Wiegelmann
- Elected: 2025

Main-Kinzig – Wetterau II – Schotten is an electoral constituency (German: Wahlkreis) represented in the Bundestag. It elects one member via first-past-the-post voting. Under the current constituency numbering system, it is designated as constituency 174. It is located in eastern Hesse, comprising eastern and central parts of Main-Kinzig-Kreis, the eastern part of Wetteraukreis district, and the municipality of Schotten from Vogelsbergkreis.

Main-Kinzig – Wetterau II – Schotten was created for the 2013 federal election. From 2021 to 2025, it was represented by Bettina Müller of the Social Democratic Party (SPD). Since 2025 it has been represented by Johannes Wiegelmann of the CDU.

== Geography ==
Main-Kinzig – Wetterau II – Schotten is located in eastern Hesse. As of the 2021 federal election, it comprises the entirety of the Main-Kinzig-Kreis district excluding the municipalities of Bruchköbel, Erlensee, Großkrotzenburg, Hammersbach, Hanau, Hasselroth, Langenselbold, Maintal, Neuberg, Nidderau, Niederdorfelden, Rodenbach, Ronneburg, and Schöneck, as well as the municipalities of Altenstadt, Büdingen, Gedern, Glauburg, Hirzenhain, Kefenrod, Limeshain, and Ortenberg from the Wetteraukreis district, and the municipality of Schotten from the Vogelsbergkreis district.

== History ==
The 2013 federal redistribution saw Hesse allocated an additional constituency. Main-Kinzig – Wetterau II – Schotten was created from parts of the constituencies of Gießen, Fulda, Wetterau, and Hanau. Until 2025, it was constituency number 175. Its borders have not changed since its creation.

== Members ==
The constituency was first represented by Peter Tauber of the Christian Democratic Union (CDU) from 2013 to 2021. It was won by Bettina Müller of the Social Democratic Party (SPD) in 2021.

Election	Member	Party	%
2013	Peter Tauber	CDU	48.8
2017	Peter Tauber	CDU	36.4
2021	Bettina Müller	SPD	30.5
2025	Johannes Wiegelmann	CDU	34.1

== Election results ==
=== 2025 election ===
Federal election (2025): Main-Kinzig – Wetterau II – Schotten
Notes:	Blue background denotes the winner of the electorate vote. Pink background denotes a candidate elected from their party list. Yellow background denotes an electorate win by a list member, or other incumbent. A ✓ or ✗ denotes status of any incumbent, win or lose respectively.						
Party	Candidate	Votes	%	±%	Party votes	%	±%
CDU	Johannes Wiegelmann	49,613	34.1	▲6.6	44,475	30.5	▲6.3
AfD	Jürgen Mohn	36,229	24.9	▲11.9	36,169	24.8	▲12.2
SPD	Michael Neuner	29,795	20.5	▼10.0	23,746	16.3	▼11.1
Greens	Philip Schinkel	10,739	7.4	▼2.0	12,820	8.8	▼2.3
Left	Helge Fitz	7,063	4.9	▲1.8	8,356	5.7	▲2.5
FDP	Markus Schmidt	4,755	3.3	▼7.9	6,777	4.7	▼8.0
BSW					6,045	4.2	New
FW	Liam Ulrich	4,510	3.1	▼0.6	2,769	1.9	▼0.6
Tierschutzpartei					2,194	1.5	▼0.4
Volt	Samuel Mergenthal	1,722	1.2	New	978	0.7	▲0.3
PARTEI					793	0.5	▼0.4
BD	Marco Groh	877	0.6	New	364	0.2	New
Humanists					101	0.1	0.0
MLPD					37	<0.1	0.0
Informal votes		1,616			1,295		
Total valid votes		145,303			145,624		
Turnout		146,919	83.7	▲6.9			
CDU gain from SPD	Majority	13,384	9.2	▲1.1			

=== 2021 election ===
Federal election (2021): Main-Kinzig – Wetterau II – Schotten
Notes:	Blue background denotes the winner of the electorate vote. Pink background denotes a candidate elected from their party list. Yellow background denotes an electorate win by a list member, or other incumbent. A ✓ or ✗ denotes status of any incumbent, win or lose respectively.						
Party	Candidate	Votes	%	±%	Party votes	%	±%
SPD	Bettina Müller	41,160	30.5	▲2.2	36,943	27.4	▲3.8
CDU	Johannes Wiegelmann	37,118	27.5	▼8.9	32,685	24.2	▼7.5
AfD	Mariana Harder-Kühnel	17,586	13.0	▼1.8	17,079	12.6	▼2.7
FDP	Andrea Rahn-Farr	15,098	11.2	▲5.1	17,046	12.6	▲2.2
Greens	Knut Kiesel	12,691	9.4	▲4.0	15,009	11.1	▲4.0
FW	Carsten Hildebrandt	4,939	3.7	▲1.6	3,435	2.5	▲1.4
Left	Stella Luise Smith	4,078	3.0	▼2.9	4,308	3.2	▼3.4
Tierschutzpartei					2,579	1.9	▲0.7
dieBasis	Brigitte Meyer-Simon	2,214	1.6		1,873	1.4	
PARTEI					1,255	0.9	▲0.1
Pirates					584	0.4	0.0
NPD					497	0.4	▼0.6
Volt					452	0.3	
Team Todenhöfer					356	0.3	
Gesundheitsforschung					263	0.2	
Bündnis C					146	0.1	
ÖDP					137	0.1	▼0.1
Humanists					124	0.1	
V-Partei3					116	0.1	▼0.1
Bündnis 21					60	0.0	
DKP					37	0.0	0.0
LKR					28	0.0	
MLPD					25	0.0	0.0
Informal votes		2,186			2,033		
Total valid votes		134,884			135,037		
Turnout		137,070	76.9	▼0.2			
SPD gain from CDU	Majority	4,042	3.0				

=== 2017 election ===
Federal election (2017): Main-Kinzig – Wetterau II – Schotten
Notes:	Blue background denotes the winner of the electorate vote. Pink background denotes a candidate elected from their party list. Yellow background denotes an electorate win by a list member, or other incumbent. A ✓ or ✗ denotes status of any incumbent, win or lose respectively.						
Party	Candidate	Votes	%	±%	Party votes	%	±%
CDU	✓ Peter Tauber	49,479	36.4	▼12.4	43,147	31.7	▼9.5
SPD	Bettina Müller	38,462	28.3	▼4.1	32,069	23.6	▼4.2
AfD	Mariana Harder-Kühnel	20,172	14.8		20,927	15.4	▲9.0
FDP	Pierre Kurth	8,326	6.1	▲3.8	14,144	10.4	▲5.3
Left	Dirk Udo Methfessel	8,007	5.9	▲0.6	8,938	6.6	▲1.1
Greens	Matthias Zach	7,346	5.4	0.0	9,614	7.1	▼0.6
Tierschutzpartei					1,668	1.2	
FW	Ulrich Majunke	2,865	2.1		1,590	1.2	▲0.1
NPD	Daniel Lachmann	1,212	0.9	▼1.9	1,249	0.9	▼1.2
PARTEI					1,142	0.8	▲0.3
Pirates					549	0.4	▼1.7
ÖDP					249	0.2	
DM					222	0.2	
V-Partei³					209	0.2	
BGE					208	0.2	
BüSo					42	0.0	0.0
MLPD					37	0.0	0.0
DKP					22	0.0	
Informal votes		2,324			2,167		
Total valid votes		135,869			136,026		
Turnout		138,193	77.1	▲4.5			
CDU hold	Majority	11,018	8.1	▼8.3			

=== 2013 election ===
Federal election (2013): Main-Kinzig – Wetterau II – Schotten
Notes:	Blue background denotes the winner of the electorate vote. Pink background denotes a candidate elected from their party list. Yellow background denotes an electorate win by a list member, or other incumbent. A ✓ or ✗ denotes status of any incumbent, win or lose respectively.						
Party	Candidate	Votes	%	±%	Party votes	%	±%
CDU	Peter Tauber	61,911	48.8	▲7.9	52,305	41.2	▲7.4
SPD	Bettina Müller	41,061	32.4	▲0.1	35,313	27.8	▲3.1
Greens	Udo Gernot Weiß	6,815	5.4	▼0.8	9,720	7.7	▼1.8
AfD					8,098	6.4	
Left	Andreas Müller	6,739	5.3	▼1.7	6,934	5.5	▼3.0
Pirates	Reinhard Schaffert	3,746	3.0		2,666	2.1	▲0.1
NPD	Daniel Lachmann	3,538	2.8	▲0.5	2,662	2.1	▲0.1
FDP	Conrad Buchholz	2,963	2.3	▼7.2	6,516	5.1	▼12.0
FW					1,325	1.0	
PARTEI					630	0.5	
REP					487	0.4	▼0.5
PRO					187	0.1	
SGP					74	0.0	
BüSo					72	0.1	▼0.1
MLPD					25	0.0	0.0
Informal votes		4,237			3,996		
Total valid votes		126,773			127,014		
Turnout		131,010	72.6	▼0.6			
CDU win new seat	Majority	20,850	16.4				
