= Johannes Wiegelmann =

German politician (born 1993)

Johannes Wiegelmann MdB

Member of the Bundestag; for Main-Kinzig – Wetterau II – Schotten
- Incumbent
- Assumed office 25 March 2025
- Preceded by: Bettina Müller

Personal details
- Born: Johannes Thomas Maria Wiegelmann; 2 February 1993 (age 33) Fulda, Germany
- Party: Christian Democratic Union
- Education: HHU Düsseldorf

Johannes Thomas Maria Wiegelmann (born 2 February 1993) is a German politician who was elected as a member of the Bundestag in 2025. He has served as chairman of the Christian Democratic Union in Bad Soden-Salmünster since 2011.
