= Party of Humanists =

German political party

Party of Humanists Partei der Humanisten
- Abbreviation: PdH
- Chairperson: Felicitas Klings
- General Secretary: Sascha Klughardt
- Founded: 4 October 2014; 12 years ago
- Headquarters: Beilsteiner Str. 21, 12681 Berlin
- Membership (September 2024): ▲2,350+
- Ideology: Secular humanism Secular liberalism Social liberalism Civil libertarianism Progressivism
- Political position: Centre-left
- Colours: Blue-magenta; White; Light blue; Magenta
- Bundestag: 0 / 630
- State Parliaments: 0 / 1,821
- European Parliament: 0 / 96

Website
- pdh.eu

The Party of Humanists (German: Partei der Humanisten) is a minor political party in Germany that first participated in the 2017 federal election. It is considered left-of-centre and supports socially liberal and secular policies, such as a federal European state, openness towards technologies such as stem cell research and strict separation between state and religion. The party contested the 2017 and 2021 federal elections, the 2019 European elections and numerous state elections from 2018 onwards. It also contested the 2024 European Parliament election in Germany.

== History ==
In spring 2012, the Facebook group "Initiative Humanismus" created the "Manifesto of the Initiative Humanismus", which was to serve as the basis for a humanist party. The Party of Humanists was founded on the basis of this document on 4 October 2014 in Berlin. The provisional executive committee consisted of eight spokespersons for various subject areas.

At the first ordinary federal party conference in March 2015, David Helmus was elected as the party's first chairman. Beka Kobaidze served as secretary general, while Ioana Hauke took over as treasurer. According to the chairman, the party had around 75 members in September of the same year.

The Berlin regional association was founded on 2 April 2016. A few months later, the regional associations of Hesse, North Rhine-Westphalia and Baden-Württemberg were founded. Shortly afterwards, in February of the following year, the Bavarian state association was also founded.

On 21 March 2017, the Party held a joint press conference along with the Pirate Party Germany, the Liberal Democrats, the New Liberals, the Transhuman Party Germany, and parts of the youth organization of The Left to announce a "social-liberal proclamation" and better cooperation among the participating organizations.

In the 2017 German federal election, the Humanist Party took part in an election for the first time, although it was initially only electable in North Rhine-Westphalia. For this purpose, various teams were set up within the party, which now has around 600 members, for internal party organisation. In the election, the party received 5.991 second votes. After the federal election, the party received an influx of new members. As a result, state associations were founded in Hamburg and Lower Saxony in the same year, as well as state associations in Saxony, Saxony-Anhalt, Rhineland-Palatinate, Bremen and Schleswig-Holstein in 2018.

In January 2019, Steven Pinker was accepted onto the advisory board of the Humanist Party. One month later, in February 2019, Michael Shermer, founder of the American Skeptics Society, also became a member of the advisory board.

The Humanist Party was registered for the European elections on 15 March 2019, in which it took part with its lead candidate Robin Thiedmann. It achieved 0.2% of 62,604 votes, but missed out on a place in the European Parliament. In 2021, the last four state associations, Brandenburg, Mecklenburg-Western Pomerania, Thuringia and Saarland were founded. Shortly after the founding of the Brandenburg state association, the party celebrated its new size of 1800 members. In light of the COVID-19 pandemic, the first digital federal party conference was held on 29 January and 20 February 2022.

In April 2023, 19-year-old Lasse Schäfer was elected as the new national chairman. This makes him the youngest party chairman in Germany.

== Party platform ==
The underlying ideology is evolutionary humanism. The core themes of the Humanist Party are science and education, the right of self-determination of the individual, and secularization. For example, the party supports the liberal and self-responsible use of drugs, supports legal voluntary euthanasia and is against circumcision of children. The party also supports the implementation of universal basic income. The party is considered left of the political centre.

Currently, the Party of Humanists is the only party in Germany that specifically targets non-religious people, freethinkers, and atheists as voters.

=== Programme ===
==== Health and science ====
- Compulsory health insurance should only cover evidence based medicine, not pseudomedicine such as homeopathy
- Legalization of active euthanasia under specific circumstances
- Legalization of all drugs, but only for adults and with more prevention measures such as education, drug-checking, regulated production and sale
- Openness towards new technology and impartial assessment of the harms benefits, e. g. with respect to genome editing and stem cell research
- Reduction of antibiotic use in livestock farming in order to avoid emerging resistances
- Funding for in-vitro-meat research

==== EU and military ====
- Founding of a united European Federal Republic. Today's national states shall be converted into strong sovereign regions.
- Rejection of a compulsory military service year for young adults
- Establishing a united European military

==== Economy ====
- Simplification of the tax system by eliminating exemptions as well as cutback on unnecessary subsidies
- Deregulation of shop opening hours on Sundays
- Trialing and implementation of universal basic income

==== Climate ====
- Stopping the nuclear energy phase-out in Germany and utilization of new reactor types to combat climate change

==== Social topics ====
- Legalization of surrogate motherhood
- Legalization of sex work, modeling after New Zealand
- Legalization of abortion regardless of gestation age, modeling after Canadian abortion laws

==== Freedom of speech and the Internet ====
- Repeal of upload-filters and protection of net-neutrality

==== Religion ====
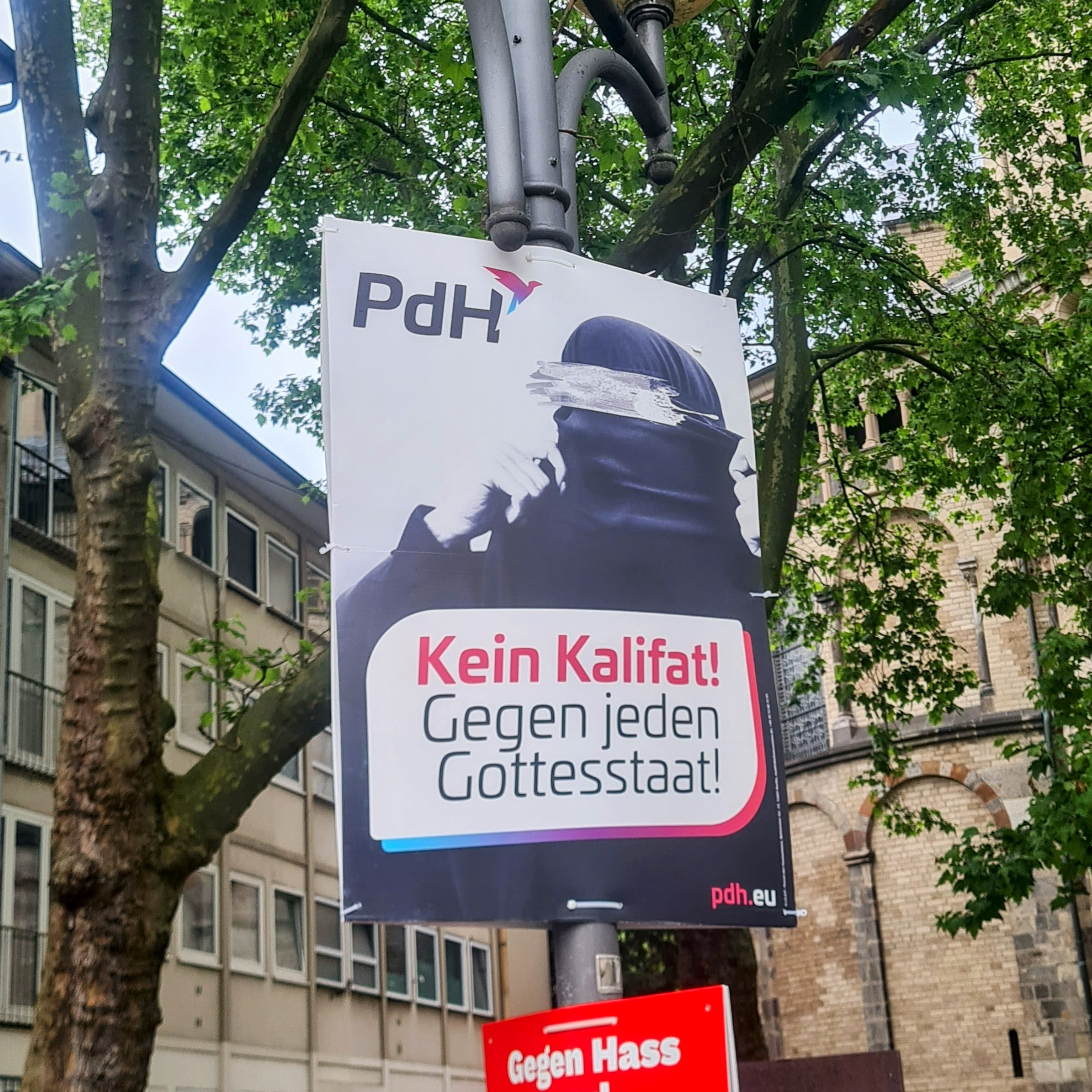
"No caliphate" campaign poster of PdH in the June 2024 EU Parliament election

- Complete separation of church and state
- Introduction of unified ethics education instead of compulsory religious education in schools
- Removing references to god from the constitution and other laws
- Prohibition of medically not-indicated religious circumcision in children unable to consent

== Leadership ==
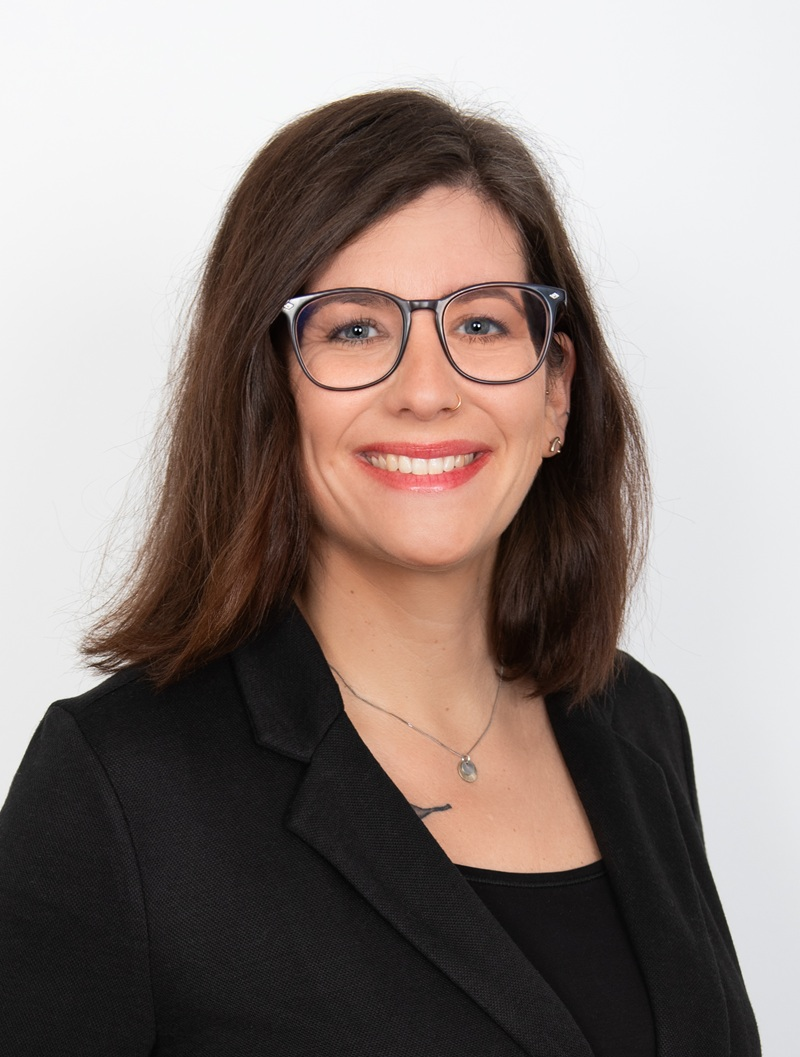
Felicitas Klings has led the party since July 2024.

Since 15 July 2024, the party's leadership has consisted of:

- Felicitas Klings (Party Leader)
- Sascha Klughardt (General Secretary)
- Narek Avetisyan (Treasurer)

=== Federal executive board ===
The party's federal executive board is made up of:

- Ole Teschke
- Dominic Vice
- Josephine Keller
- Andreas Stirner
- Daniel Keye
- Dr. Jochen Sieck
- Manuel Cran
- Ricardo Reitz

== Federal state parties ==
	Federal state party	Date of Founding	Chairman	Last state election participation	Last country-wide election participation
Baden-Württemberg	Baden-Württemberg	3 December 2016	Steven Schmitt	2021 Baden-Württemberg state election	2021 German federal election
Bayern	Bavaria	11 February 2017	Frederic Forkel	2018 Bavarian state election	2021 German federal election
Berlin	Berlin	2 April 2017	Barend Wolf	2021 Berlin state election	2021 German federal election
Brandenburg	Brandenburg	13 March 2021	Tim Ewert	-	2021 German federal election
Bremen	Bremen	9 June 2018	Julia Kreitz	2019 Bremen state election	2021 German federal election
Hamburg	Hamburg	1 October 2017	Michael Brandt	2020 Hamburg state election	2021 German federal election
Hessen	Hesse	25 September 2016	Dennis Wörner	2018 Hessian state election	2021 German federal election
Mecklenburg-Vorpommern	Mecklenburg-Vorpommern	24 May 2021	Tom Kühnel	2021 Mecklenburg-Vorpommern state election	2021 German federal election
Niedersachsen	Lower Saxony	25 November 2017	Rainer Rößler	-	2021 German federal election
Nordrhein-Westfalen	North Rhine-Westphalia	22 October 2016	Leonard Niesik	-	2021 German federal election
Rheinland-Pfalz	Rhineland-Palatinate	15 April 2018	Tristan Marsell	-	2021 German federal election
Saarland	Saarland	20 November 2021	Fabian Grünewald	-	2019 European Parliament election
Sachsen	Saxony	7 January 2018	Jonas Lehn	2019 Saxony state election	2021 German federal election
Sachsen-Anhalt	Saxony-Anhalt	31 March 2018	Konstantin Zisiadis	2021 Saxony-Anhalt state election	2021 German federal election
Schleswig Holstein	Schleswig-Holstein	20 October 2018	Marvin Weidemeier	2022 Schleswig-Holstein state election	2021 German federal election
Thüringen	Thuringia	29 May 2021	Anthony Ramstedt	-	2021 German federal election

== Election results ==
=== Federal parliament (Bundestag) ===
Election	Leader	Constituency		Party list		Seats	+/–	Government
Election	Leader	Votes	%	Votes	%	Seats	+/–	Government
2017	Felix Bölter	—N/a		5,991	0.01 (#28)	0 / 709	New	Extra-parliamentary
2021	Alexander Mucha	12,672	0.03 (#19)	47,526	0.10 (#19)	0 / 735	0	Extra-parliamentary
2025	Felicitas Klings	1,873	0.00 (#23)	14,446	0.03 (#20)	0 / 630	0	Extra-parliamentary

=== European Parliament ===
Election	List leader	Votes	%	Seats	+/–	EP Group
2019	Robin Thiedmann	62,604	0.17 (#26)	0 / 96	New	–
2024	Sascha Boelcke	82,275	0.21 (#23)	0 / 96	0	–
