= Bettina Müller (politician) =

German politician (born 1959)

Member of the Bundestag; from Hesse
- In office 22 October 2013 – 25 March 2025
- Preceded by: Multi-member district
- Succeeded by: Johannes Wiegelmann
- Constituency: State list (2013–2021); Main-Kinzig – Wetterau II – Schotten (2021–2025)

Personal details
- Born: 7 June 1959 (age 67) Alzenau, West Germany
- Party: Social Democratic (since 1997)
- Other political affiliations: The Greens (1977–1981)
- Children: 2
- Education: Goethe University Frankfurt

Bettina Müller (born 7 June 1959) is a German nurse, lawyer and politician of the Social Democratic Party (SPD) who served as a member of the Bundestag from the state of Hesse from 2013 to 2025.

== Political career ==
Müller first became a member of the Bundestag in the 2013 German federal election, representing the Main-Kinzig – Wetterau II – Schotten district. In parliament, she served as a member of the Health Committee.

Within her parliamentary group, Müller belonged to the Parliamentary Left, a left-wing movement.

In August 2024, Müller announced that she would not stand in the 2025 federal elections but instead resign from active politics by the end of the parliamentary term.
