= Liberal Democrats (Germany) =

Liberal Democrats Liberale Demokraten
- Abbreviation: LD
- Chairperson: Jens Lünenstraß
- General Secretary: Philipp Gräser
- Deputy Chairperson: Mediya Biparva
- Founder: Ulrich Krüger
- Founded: 28 November 1982; 43 years ago
- Split from: Free Democratic Party
- Headquarters: Aachen, North Rhine-Westphalia
- Membership (2023): 100
- Ideology: Liberalism (German); Social liberalism Progressivism; Pro-Europeanism
- Political position: Centre to centre-left
- Colours: Orange
- Bundestag: 0 / 709
- State Parliaments: 0 / 1,821
- European Parliament: 0 / 96

Website
- liberale-demokraten.de

The Liberal Democrats – The Social Liberals (German: Liberale Demokraten – Die Sozialliberalen), abbreviated to LD, is a minor social liberal party in Germany, founded in 1982 and currently led by Paul Vossiek.

== History ==
The party was founded on 28 November 1982 mainly by former members of the Free Democratic Party, after the FDP had left the social-liberal coalition led by Chancellor Helmut Schmidt and formed a new government with the conservative Christian Democratic Union.

On 21 March 2017, the Party held a joint press conference along with the Pirate Party Germany, the Party of Humanists, the New Liberals, the Transhuman Party Germany, and the youth organization of The Left to announce a "social liberal proclamation" (German: Sozialliberale Erklärung) and better cooperation among the participating organizations. The proclamation was followed by a joint press statement with the New Liberals in early 2020, declaring an intent of embracing a close cooperation between the parties in the state of North Rhine-Westphalia.

== Party program ==
=== Basic principles ===
The Liberal Democrats passed their "social-liberal principles" (German: Sozialliberale Leitgedanken) in their 47th general assembly in Göttingen. Therein, they call for "human dignity through self-determination", "equality of all mankind", "progress through reason" and "democratisation of society".

=== Education ===
For the Liberal Democrats, education is deemed as "one of the most important goals of social liberal politics". They call for a federally uniform educational system and centralised exams. The educational system shall be reformed as a comprehensive school system. They also call for the replacement of the current religious education through a single class taken by all students regardless of religious and cultural affiliation.

=== Civil rights ===
As outlined in their "social-liberal principles", the Liberal Democrats advocate for "equal civil rights for all human beings". Securing privacy is one of the core elements of their policy. They demand the extension of the secrecy of correspondence to an overall secrecy of communications including digital communication. Furthermore, they oppose data retention without prior suspicion as well as eavesdropping operations on homes. The Liberal Democrats refer to personal data as "property of the data subject" and demand user-friendly privacy. They urge for a right to end-to-end encrypted communication and oppose the introduction of voting machines.

Amongst equal rights for all human beings, they demand equal rights and acceptance for homosexual couples and other forms of relationship. They also urge to abolish the blood donation prohibition for homosexual people in Germany.

=== Democracy ===
The Liberal Democrats call for decreasing the electoral threshold, a single transferable vote and lowering the voting age to 16. They claim that non-citizens with a long-term main residence in Germany are also part of the multicultural society and shall be eligible to vote. They also demand to introduce more direct democratic elements and a stricter separation of church and state.

=== Social policy ===
The Liberal Democrats call for the introduction of an unconditional basic income, in which all tax-financed social assistance of the state is combined. This should be available immediately via an adjustment of the tax curve in the event of income shortfalls, without representing an additional income for people with high incomes.

They also urge to "actively fight against homelessness through housing instead of pushing the topic into the background". To that end, they propose a Housing First solution and demand to end financial subsidies for defensive architecture.

=== Health policy ===
The Liberal Democrats favour to establish a national healthcare scheme similar to the British National Health Service. Additional coverage through complementary insurances shall remain possible. They focus on the infrastructure, personnel as well as digitalisation of the healthcare system. Mental health is also one of the main points in their health policy.

They also demand to reform various legal frameworks. As such, they outline conditions under which assisted suicide shall be legalised. They urge to abolish the prohibition of blood donation by homosexual individuals as well as to ease access to abortion and assisted reproductive technology.

=== Economic Policy ===
The Liberal Democrats call for a social market economy. They define social market economy as an economy in which the state shall interfere as less as possible. However at the point at which the invisible hand fails and the economy acts in disfavour of society, the state shall interfere. Safeguarding access to basic supplies and infrastructure has the highest priority in their economic policy. They also take high priority in ensuring labor welfare and outline it as a main condition for access to any subventions from the state. Providing the same wage for the same work regardless of a person's gender is also considered part of the fair working conditions they demand.

They favor a structural policy that focuses on innovation and adjustment. They demand to uphold a balanced budget amendment with little exceptions to it. They are also proposing to reform the tax system partially while sustaining progressive taxation. Furthermore, they demand to establish a fiscal union within the European Union.

=== European Union ===
The Liberal Democrats favour the European Union and demand to further deepen the Union. To do so, they urge to reform the EU as a "European Republic" with a European Parliament with more competences at its core. They call for establishing a common European government and constitution.

The Liberal Democrats urge for solutions at EU-level for various topics, such as in asylum and migration policy, labour policy as well as a common defense policy through establishing an EU-Army. Furthermore, they propose to establish a fiscal union.

=== Foreign Policy ===
The Liberal Democrats make positive remarks on how the European Economic Community evolved into the EU and emphasise the advantages of international cooperation. As such, they demand to increase development aid and establish a global partnership in the fight against poverty. Furthermore, they demand to reform the United Nations with a UN Parliamentary Assembly representing humankind at its core. The reformed UN shall also establish a UN-Army, making national armies unnecessary.

The Liberal Democrats demand that military actions shall always be seen as a last resort and always follow legitimation through a UN resolution or a casus foederis. They also condemn violations to international law in terms of invasion, occupation, resettlements and coups in foreign territory while endorsing nonviolent resistances of groups of people for their right of self-determination. They consider aiming for multilateral agreements to be the best way to resolve conflicts.

== Leadership ==
The current federal committee of the Liberal Democrats was elected through postal vote and consists of five members:

- Jens Lünenstraß (Party Leader)
- Mediya Biparva (Deputy Chair)
- Philipp Gräser (General Secretary)
- Maik Geiermann (Managing Director)
- Christian Fuchte (Treasurer)
- Luca Kunert (Deputy Treasurer)
- Thorsten Rödel (Board Member)
- Moritz Weck (Board Member)

== Federal state parties ==
	Federal state party	Chairman	Election participation
Baden-Württemberg	Baden-Württemberg	Michael Kaiser	none
Berlin	Berlin	Chris Ward	2021 Berlin state election 2023 Berlin state election
Lower Saxony	Lower Saxony	Steve Bourne	none
Nordrhein-Westfalen	North Rhine-Westphalia	Simon Kleinlützum	2017 North Rhine-Westphalia state election
	Saarland	Alexander Heusel Philip Lukas	none
Sachsen	Saxony	David Hildebrandt	none
