= Mariana Harder-Kühnel =

German politician (born 1974)

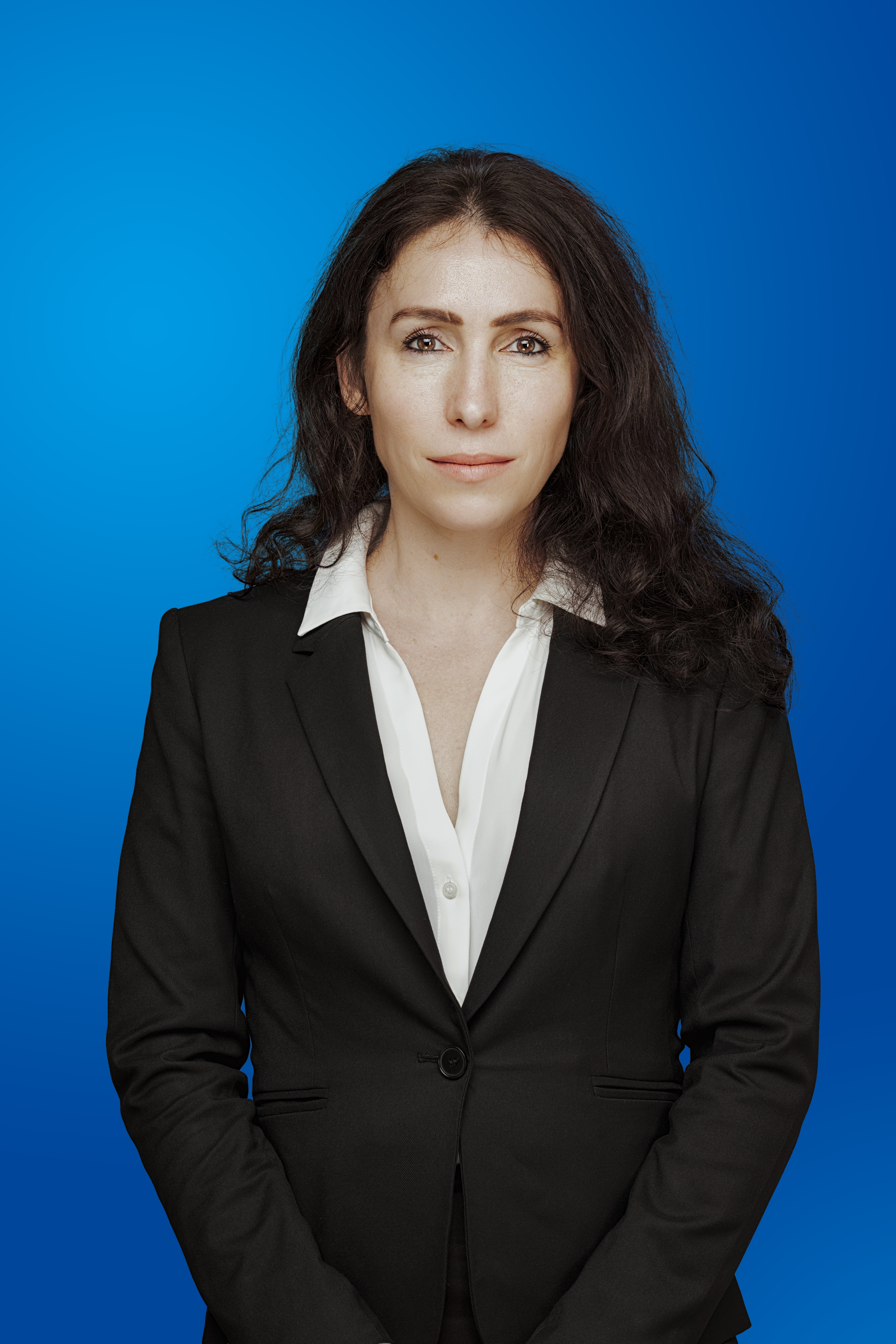
- Harder-Kühnel in 2020

Member of the Bundestag
- Incumbent
- Assumed office 24 September 2017
- Constituency: Main-Kinzig – Wetterau II – Schotten

Personal details
- Born: 16 August 1974 (age 52) Gelnhausen, West Germany
- Party: AfD (since 2013)
- Children: 3
- Education: University of Giessen

Mariana Harder-Kühnel (born 16 August 1974) is a German politician of the Alternative for Germany (AfD) party. Since October 2017, she has served as member of the Bundestag.

In November 2018, the AfD unsuccessfully nominated Harder-Kühnel for the vacant post of one of the Vice Presidents of the Bundestag.

Harder-Kühnel is married and has three children. She is a practicing Roman Catholic.
