= New Liberals (Germany) =

Association in Germany

The Social Liberals
- Die Sozialliberalen
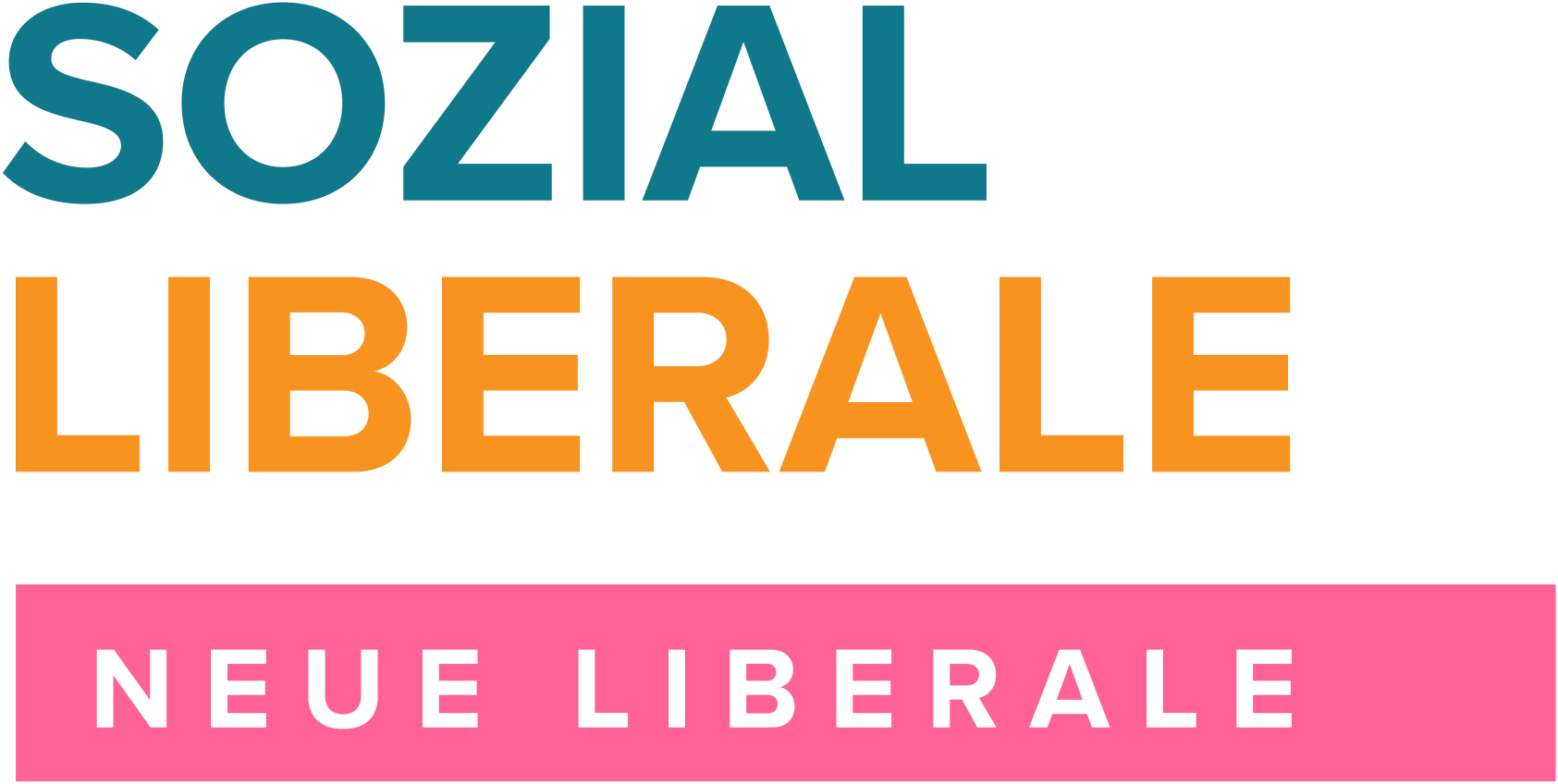
- Founded: 14 September 2014
- Dissolved: 7 June 2021 (as political party)
- Headquarters: Oldenburger Str. 6 D-10551 Berlin
- Location: Germany
- Services: Bipartisan think tank
- Fields: Social liberalism European federalism
- Chairman: Christian Bethke
- Website: sozialliberal.de

New Liberals candidate for European Parliament Chris Pyak on the goals of the party

The Social Liberals (German: Die Sozialliberalen), formerly New Liberals (German: Neue Liberale), is an association and a former minor political party in Germany based in Berlin.

The former party was created as a split from the Free Democratic Party (FDP) operating in multiple states, and was founded on 28 September 2014 in Wilhelmsburg, Hamburg.

The association states its distance from the FDP and its economic liberalism, and aims to create a programme based on social liberalism.

The New Liberals form a parliamentary group in the district of Harburg (part of Hamburg) and currently have 3 seats in the assembly.

On 6 January 2015, the Liberal Democrats, the New Liberals and another small party declared their intent to cooperate with the objective of an eventual merger. The LD still features this prominently, while the New Liberals had since restructured.

On 7 June 2021, the Social Liberals leadership announced their recommendation to dissolve as a party and to recommend its members to join Volt Deutschland, the German branch of Volt Europa, a progressive and federalist European political alliance.

== Views ==
In 2014, their platform stated that they were committed to social-liberal traditions, the social market economy, civil rights, and Europe.
